= Virginia State Route 218 =

State highway in Virginia, United States

State Route 218

Route information
- Maintained by VDOT
- Length: 30.00 mi (48.28 km)
- Existed: 1933–present
- Tourist routes: Virginia Byway

Major junctions
- West end: US 1 / US 17 Bus. in Falmouth
- SR 206 in Berthaville; US 301 in Owens
- East end: SR 205 in Tetotum

Location
- Country: United States
- State: Virginia
- Counties: Stafford, King George

Highway system
- Virginia Routes; Interstate; US; Primary; Secondary; Byways; History; HOT lanes
← SR 217	→ US 219

State Route 218 (SR 218) is a primary state highway in the U.S. state of Virginia. The state highway runs 30.00 miles (48.28 km) from U.S. Route 1 and US 17 Business in Falmouth east to SR 205 in Tetotum. SR 218 connects suburban communities in Stafford County east of Fredericksburg with rural areas in northern and eastern King George County.

Most of SR 218 in King George County is a Virginia Byway.

== Route description ==
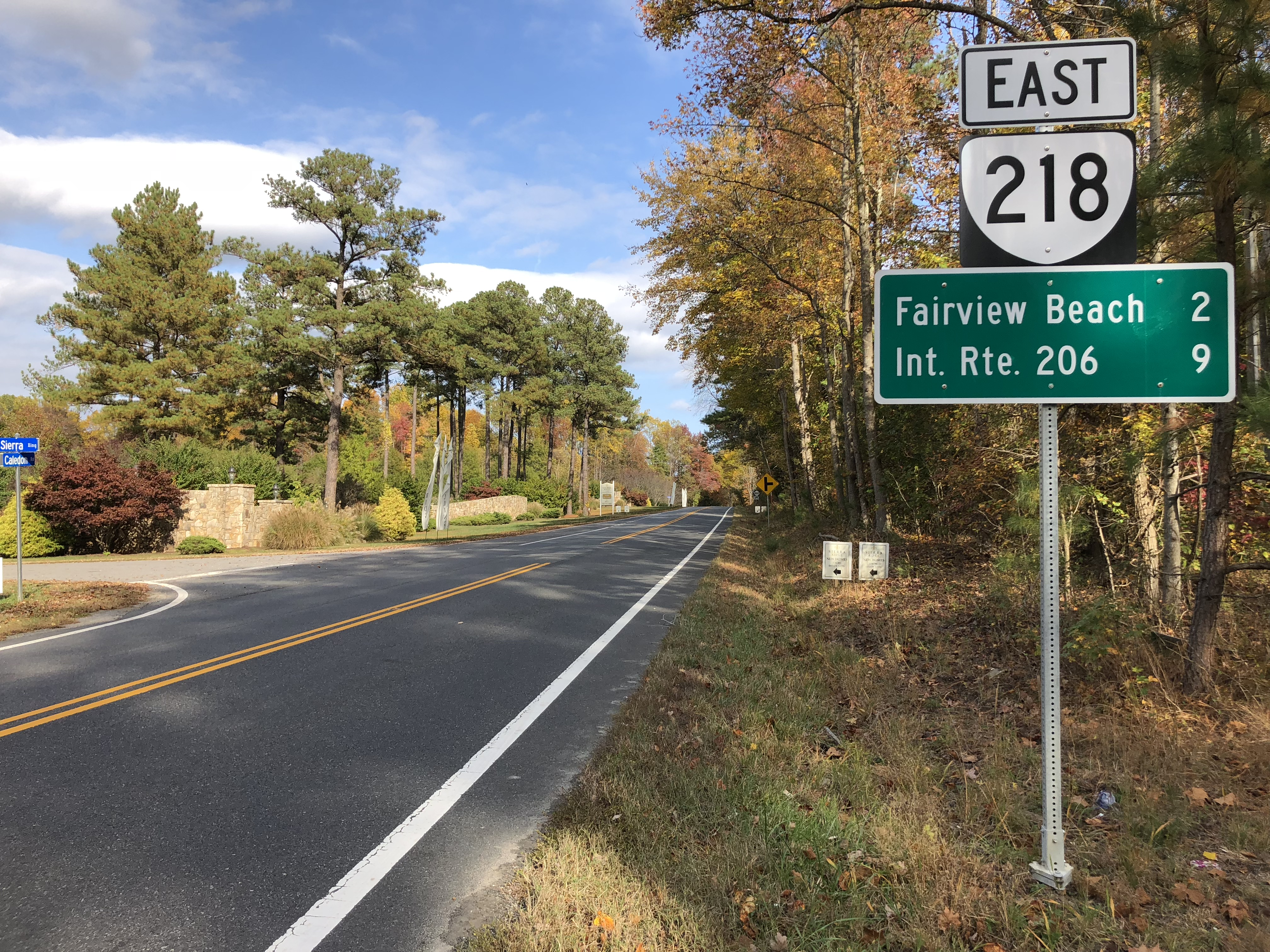
View east along SR 218 in King George County

SR 218 begins in Falmouth at the intersection with US 1 (Jefferson Davis Highway) and US 17 Business, which joins US 1 south to cross the Rappahannock River into Fredericksburg and heads west as Warrenton Road to reconnect with US 17 at Interstate 95. SR 218 heads east as two-lane undivided Butler Road through a suburban area, then expands to a four-lane divided highway prior to the intersection with SR 212 (Chatham Heights Road). SR 218 continues east as White Oak Road and crosses over CSX's RF&P Subdivision at its junction with the Dahlgren Branch at Dahlgren Junction. East of the railroad crossing, the state highway reduces to a two-lane undivided highway that connects residential subdivisions and several small communities east of Fredericksburg, including Sullivan, McCarthys Corner, and White Oak, which contains White Oak Church.

After crossing Muddy Creek into King George County, SR 218's name changes to Caledon Road. After passing through the hamlet of Passapatanzy, the state highway follows a curvilinear alignment through a forested area. SR 218 passes through the hamlets of Mustoe, Goby, and Osso and passes roads that head north to the Potomac River beach communities of Belvedere Beach, Fairview Beach, and Somerset Beach. Near the hamlets of Ambar and Hampstead, SR 218 passes along the edge of Caledon Natural Area, a National Natural Landmark that contains old growth forest and is a haven for bald eagles. At Berthaville, SR 218 joins SR 206 (Dahlgren Road) in a concurrency east to Owens. In Owens, SR 206 heads east toward Dahlgren while SR 218 turns south as Windsor Drive to an intersection with US 301 (James Madison Parkway). The state highway curves to the east to cross Upper Machodoc Creek, then turns south onto Tetotum Road. SR 218 passes through the community of Tetotum before reaching its eastern terminus at SR 205 (Ridge Road) just north of the Westmoreland County line at Pine Hill Creek.

== Major intersections ==
County	Location	mi	km	Destinations	Notes
Stafford	Falmouth	0.00	0.00	US 1 / US 17 Bus. (Cambridge Street / Warrenton Road) to I-95 – Warrenton	Western terminus
Stafford	Dahlgren Junction	1.13	1.82	SR 212 south (Chatham Heights Road) – Dahlgren, Chatham Manor	Northern terminus of SR 212
Stafford	Dahlgren Junction			SR 607 (Deacon Road / Cool Springs Road) – Fredericksburg	
King George	Berthaville	21.51	34.62	SR 206 west (Dahlgren Road) / SR 632 (St. Pauls Road) – Fredericksburg	Western end of SR 206 concurrency
King George	Owens	23.70	38.14	SR 206 east (Dahlgren Road) / SR 624 (Owens Drive) to US 301 – Dahlgren	Eastern end of SR 206 concurrency
King George		23.98	38.59	US 301 (James Madison Parkway) – Richmond, Baltimore, Annapolis	
King George		30.00	48.28	SR 205 (Ridge Road) – Colonial Beach, King George	Eastern terminus
1.000 mi = 1.609 km; 1.000 km = 0.621 mi: Concurrency terminus

< SR 623	District 6 State Routes; 1928–1933	SR 625 >
