= Virginia State Route 205 =

State highway in eastern Virginia, US

State Route 205

Route information
- Maintained by VDOT
- Length: 18.47 mi (29.72 km)
- Existed: 1933–present

Major junctions
- West end: SR 3 at Purkins Corner
- US 301 at Edgehill; SR 218 near Tetotum
- East end: SR 3 / SR 638 at Oak Grove

Location
- Country: United States
- State: Virginia
- Counties: King George, Westmoreland

Highway system
- Virginia Routes; Interstate; US; Primary; Secondary; Byways; History; HOT lanes
← SR 204	→ SR 206

State Route 205 (SR 205) is a primary state highway in the U.S. state of Virginia. The state highway runs 18.47 miles (29.72 km) from SR 3 at Purkins Corner east to SR 3 at Oak Grove. SR 205 connects several small communities in eastern King George County and northwestern Westmoreland County. The state highway also passes through the Potomac River resort of Colonial Beach, where the highway has a spur, State Route 205Y (SR 205Y).

== Route description ==
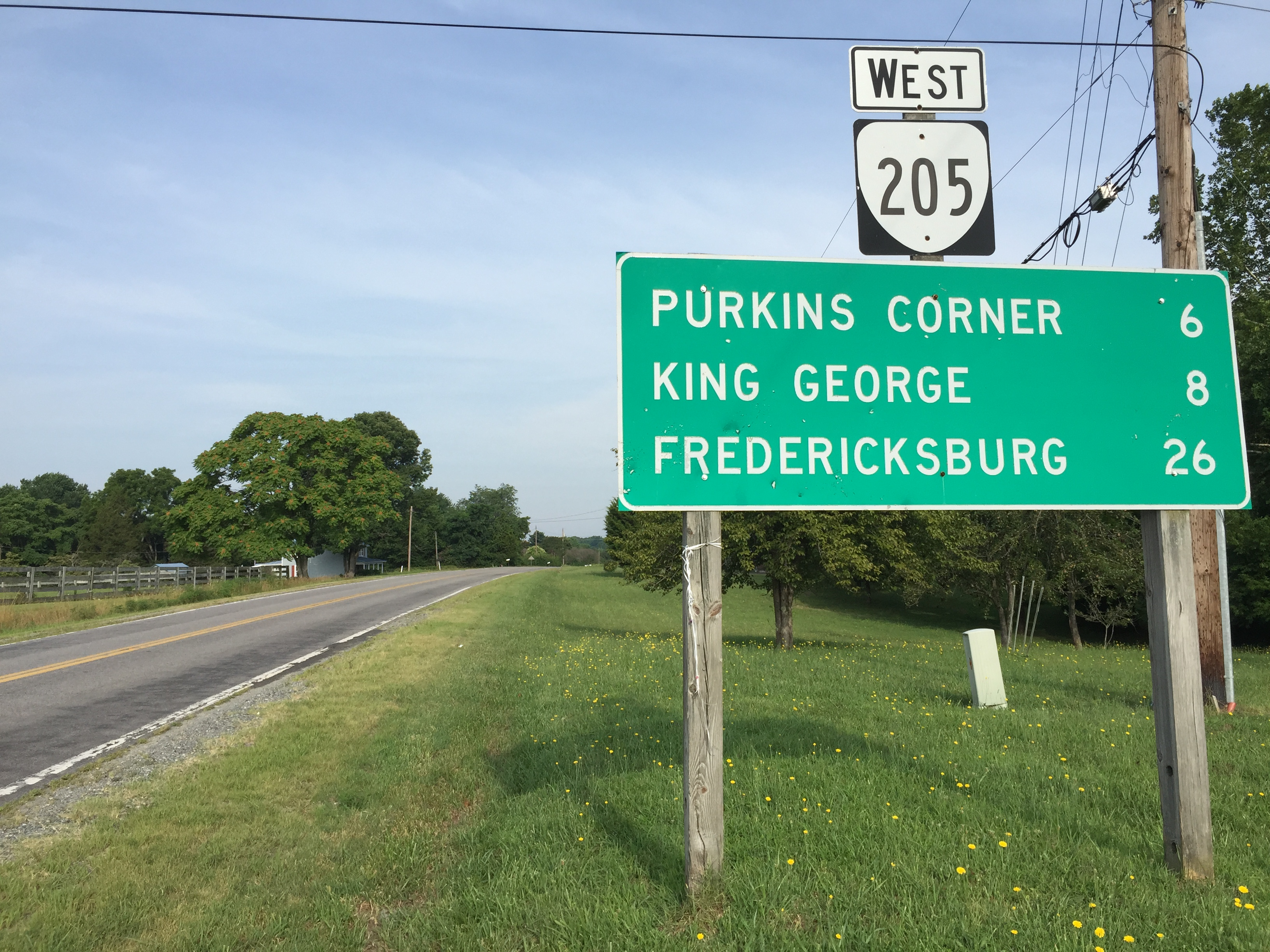
View west along SR 205 in King George County

SR 205 begins at an intersection with SR 3 (Kings Highway) at Purkins Corner a short distance to the east of King George, the county seat of King George County. The state highway heads east as Ridge Road, which follows the height of land between the Upper Machodic Creek watershed to the north and Pine Hill Creek to the south. SR 205 intersects U.S. Route 301 (James Madison Parkway) at Edgehill and passes through Carruthers Corner and Alden. The state highway continues through Ninde before it descends from the ridge to meet the eastern end of SR 218 (Tetotum Road) south of Tetotum just before crossing Pine Hill Creek into Westmoreland County. Just south of the creek, SR 205 meets the northern end of SR 631 (Longfield Road), which functions as a bypass of Colonial Beach.

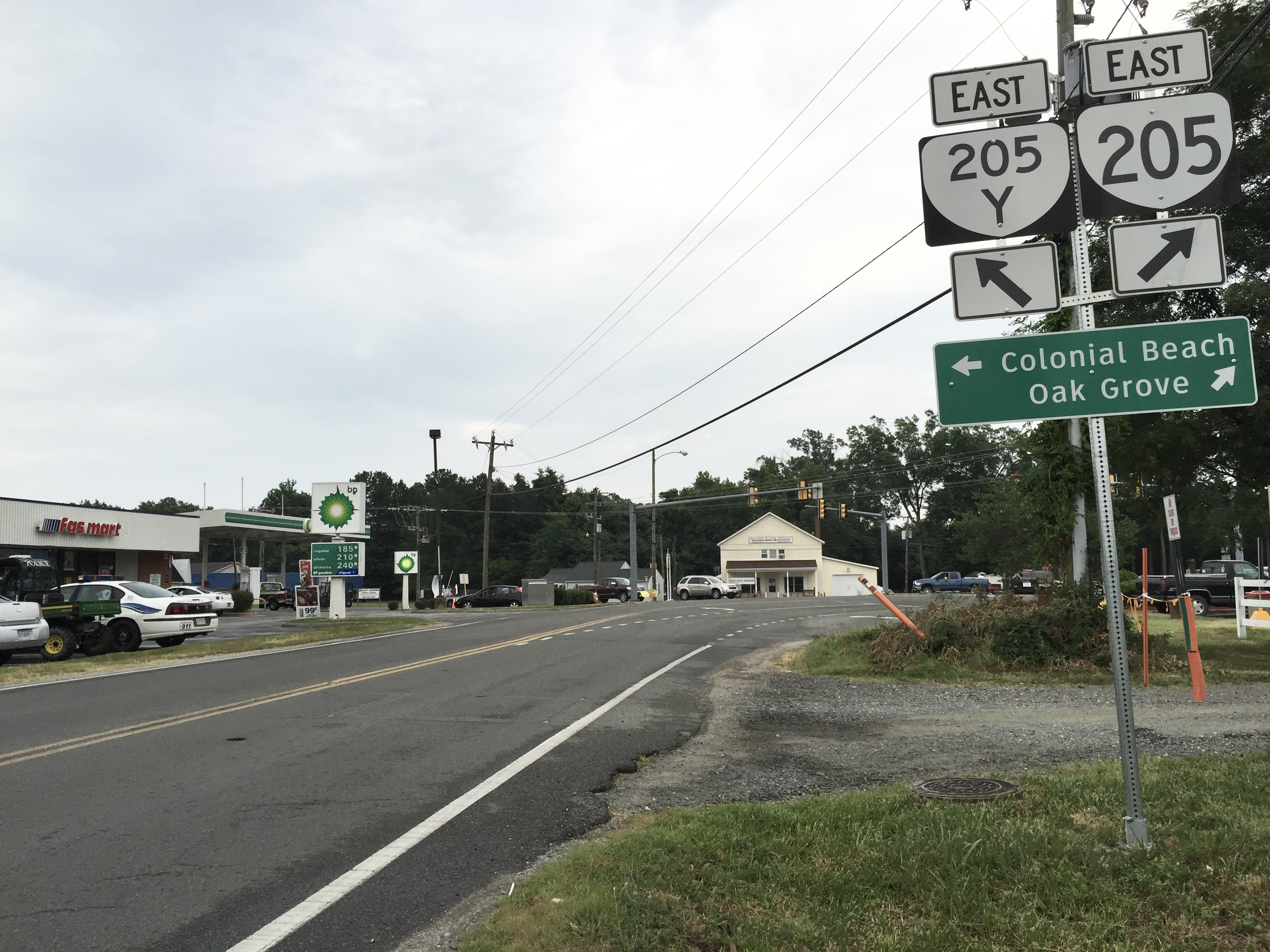
SR 205 eastbound at its junction with SR 205Y in Colonial Beach

SR 205 curves northeast to approach the Potomac River shoreline, where the highway crosses Goldman Creek into the town of Colonial Beach. The state highway curves southeast as McKinney Boulevard and passes through the Potomac Beach section of town while running a short distance within the town limits. A short distance north of Monroe Bay, SR 205 has a Y-shaped intersection with SR 205Y (Colonial Avenue). SR 205Y, which has a length of 0.71 miles (1.14 km), serves as the main street of the town and has its eastern terminus at the town's beach terrace about 150 feet (46 m) west of the Virginia–Maryland state line, which follows the low water mark of the south shore of the Potomac River. SR 205 curves southwest and exits the town as James Monroe Highway, which passes through Monroe Hall, the site of James Monroe's birthplace. The state highway meets the southern end of SR 631 (Longfield Road) and crosses Mattox Creek at Mattox Bridge. SR 205 reaches its eastern terminus at SR 3 (Kings Highway) at Oak Grove next to St. Peter's Episcopal Church.

== Major intersections ==
County	Location	mi	km	Destinations	Notes
King George	Purkins Corner	0.00	0.00	SR 3 (Kings Highway) – Warsaw, King George, Fredericksburg	Western terminus
King George	Edgehill	1.26	2.03	US 301 (James Madison Parkway) – Maryland state line, Bowling Green	
King George		7.43	11.96	SR 218 west (Tetotum Road) to US 301 – Owens	Eastern terminus of SR 218
Westmoreland	Colonial Beach	12.76	20.54	SR 205Y east (Colonial Avenue) – Colonial Beach	Western terminus of SR 205Y
Westmoreland	Oak Grove	18.47	29.72	SR 3 (Kings Highway) / SR 638 (Leedstown Road) – Kilmarnock, Fredericksburg, King George, Warsaw	Eastern terminus
1.000 mi = 1.609 km; 1.000 km = 0.621 mi

< SR 376	Spurs of SR 37; 1923–1928	none
< SR 610	District 6 State Routes; 1928–1933	SR 612 >
