= St. Paul's Episcopal Church Complex =

St. Paul's Episcopal Church Complex may refer to:

- St. Paul's Episcopal Church Complex (Patchogue, New York), listed on the National Register of Historic Places in Suffolk County, New York
- St. Paul's Episcopal Church Complex (Troy, New York), listed on the National Register of Historic Places in Rensselaer County, New York

== See also ==
- St. Paul's Episcopal Church (disambiguation)
