= Mustoe =

Mustoe may refer to:

- Mustoe (surname)
- Mustoe, Highland County, Virginia
- Mustoe, King George County, Virginia
