= St. Paul's Episcopal Church =

St. Paul's Episcopal Church or variants may refer to:

- St. Paul's Episcopal Church (Magnolia Springs, Alabama)
- Saint Paul's Episcopal Chapel (Mobile, Alabama), NRHP-listed
- St. Paul's Episcopal Church (Selma, Alabama)
- St. Paul's Episcopal Church (Tombstone, Arizona), listed on the National Register of Historic Places (NRHP)
- St. Paul's Episcopal Church (Yuma, Arizona), NRHP-listed
- St. Paul's Episcopal Church (Walnut Creek, California)
- St. Paul's Episcopal Church (Georgetown, Delaware)
- St. Paul's Episcopal Church, Rock Creek Parish (Washington, D.C.)
- St. Paul's Episcopal Church (Augusta, Georgia)
- St. Paul's Episcopal Church (Blackfoot, Idaho), NRHP-listed
- St. Paul's Reformed Episcopal Church, Chicago, Illinois
- St. Paul's Episcopal Church (Peoria, Illinois)
- St. Paul's Episcopal Church (Evansville, Indiana)
- St. Paul's Episcopal Church (Durant, Iowa)
- St. Paul's Episcopal Church (Harlan, Iowa)
- St. Paul's Episcopal Church (Henderson, Kentucky) (1859-60)
- St. Paul's Episcopal Church (Newport, Kentucky)
- St. Paul's Episcopal Church (Brunswick, Maine)
- St. Paul's Episcopal Church (Baltimore, Maryland)
- St. Paul's Episcopal Church (Hillsboro, Maryland)
- St. Paul's Episcopal Church (Point of Rocks, Maryland)
- Saint Paul's Church, Chapel, and Parish House, Brookline, Massachusetts
- St. Paul's Episcopal Church (Ironton, Missouri), NRHP-listed
- Saint Paul's Episcopal Church (Lee's Summit, Missouri)
- St. Paul's Episcopal Church (Fort Benton, Montana), a National Register of Historic Places listing in Chouteau County, Montana
- St. Paul's Episcopal Church (Virginia City, Nevada)
- St. Paul's Episcopal Church (Englewood, New Jersey)
- Grace St. Paul's Episcopal Church, Mercerville-Hamilton Square, New Jersey
- St. Paul's Episcopal Church (Brooklyn)
- St. Paul's Episcopal (Orleans, New York)
- St. Paul's Episcopal Church, now Calvary Baptist Church (Ossining, New York)
- St. Paul's Episcopal Church Complex (Patchogue, New York)
- St. Paul's Episcopal Church (Poughkeepsie, New York)
- St. Paul's Episcopal Church (Spring Valley, New York)
- St. Paul's Episcopal Church (Troy, New York)
- Saint Paul's Episcopal Church (Watertown, New York)
- St. Paul's Episcopal Church, Edenton, North Carolina
- Saint Paul's Episcopal Church (Morganton, North Carolina)
- St. Paul's Episcopal Church and Cemetery, Wilkesboro, North Carolina
- St. Paul's Episcopal Church (Rugby, North Dakota)
- St. Paul Episcopal Cathedral (Cincinnati), Ohio
- St. Paul's Episcopal Church (Cleveland, Ohio)
- St. Paul's Episcopal Church (Cleveland Heights, Ohio)
- Saint Paul's Episcopal Church (Columbus, Ohio)
- St. Paul's Episcopal Church of East Cleveland, Ohio
- St. Paul's Episcopal Church (Fremont, Ohio), NRHP-listed
- St. Paul's Episcopal Church (Hicksville, Ohio)
- St. Paul's Episcopal Church (Medina, Ohio), NRHP-listed
- St. Paul's Episcopal Church, South Bass Island, Ohio
- St. Paul's Episcopal Church (Elkins Park, Pennsylvania)
- St. Paul's Episcopal Church (Exton, Pennsylvania)
- St. Paul's Episcopal Church (Chattanooga, Tennessee)
- St. Paul's Episcopal Church (Franklin, Tennessee)
- St. Paul's Episcopal Church (Greenville, Texas)
- Saint Paul's Episcopal Church (Waxahachie, Texas)
- St. Paul's Episcopal Church (Vernal, Utah)
- St. Paul's Episcopal Church (Royalton, Vermont)
- St. Paul's Episcopal Church (Alexandria, Virginia)
- St. Paul's Episcopal Church (Hanover, Virginia), NRHP-listed
- St. Paul's Episcopal Church (Haymarket, Virginia), NRHP-listed
- St. Paul's Episcopal Church (King George, Virginia), NRHP-listed
- Saint Paul's Episcopal Church (Norfolk, Virginia)
- St. Paul's Episcopal Church (Richmond, Virginia)
- St. Paul's Episcopal Church (Port Townsend, Washington)
- St. Paul's Episcopal Church (Beloit, Wisconsin), NRHP-listed
- St. Paul's Episcopal Church (Milwaukee, Wisconsin)
- St. Paul's Episcopal Church (Watertown, Wisconsin), NRHP-listed
- St. Paul's Episcopal Church (Evanston, Wyoming)

== See also ==
- St. Paul's Church (disambiguation)
- St. Paul's Protestant Episcopal Church (disambiguation)
