= Virginia State Route 204 =

State highway in Westmoreland County, Virginia, US

State Route 204
- Popes Creek Road

Route information
- Maintained by VDOT
- Length: 1.73 mi (2.78 km)
- Existed: 1933–present
- Tourist routes: Virginia Byway

Major junctions
- West end: SR 3 near Potomac Mills
- East end: Washington's Birthplace

Location
- Country: United States
- State: Virginia
- Counties: Westmoreland

Highway system
- Virginia Routes; Interstate; US; Primary; Secondary; Byways; History; HOT lanes
← SR 203	→ SR 205

State Route 204 (SR 204) is a primary state highway in the U.S. state of Virginia. Known as Popes Creek Road, the state highway runs 1.73 miles (2.78 km) from SR 3 near Potomac Mills east to George Washington Birthplace National Monument in northwestern Westmoreland County.

SR 204 is a Virginia Byway.

== Route description ==
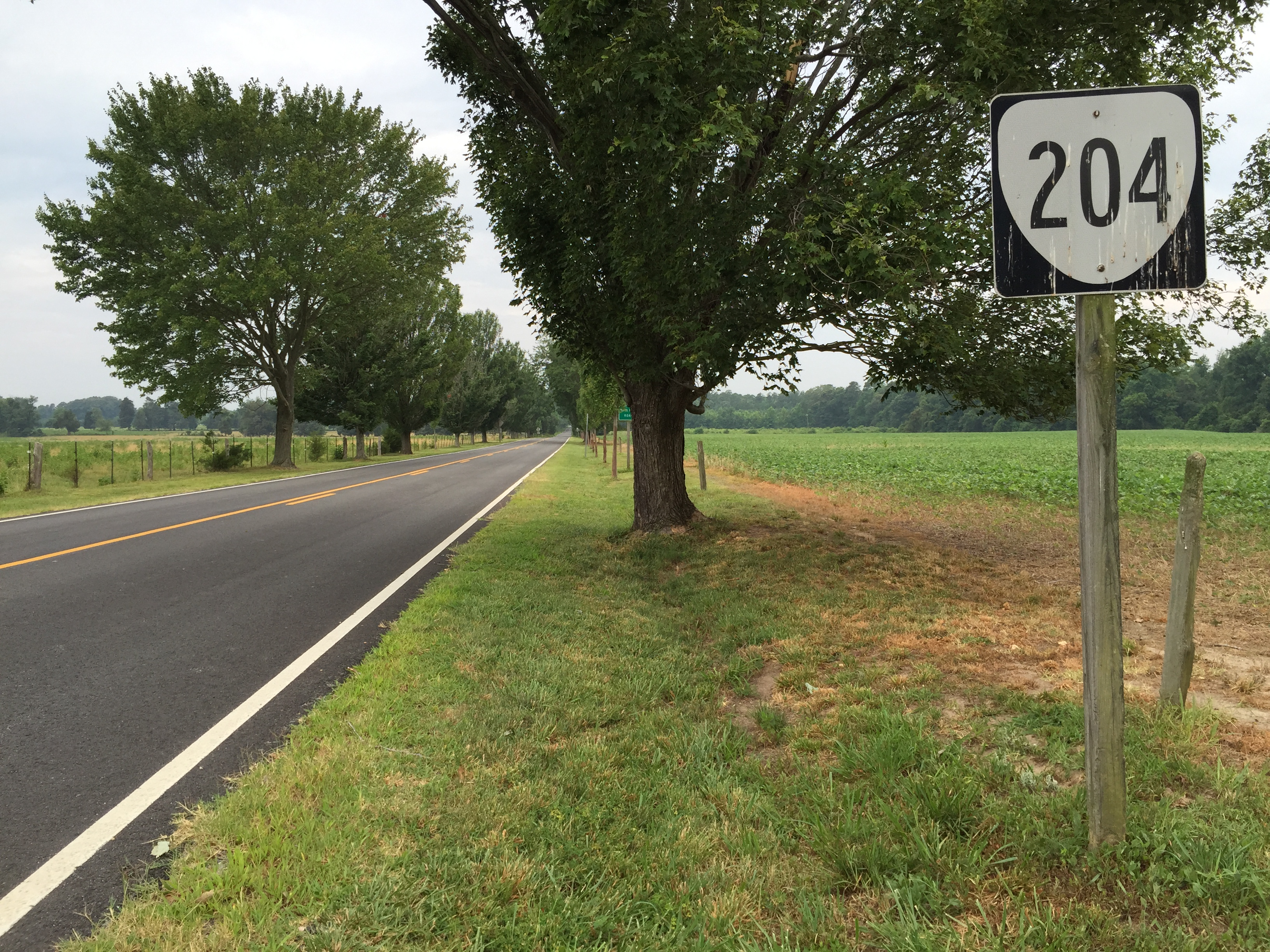
View west at the east end of SR 204 at the George Washington Birthplace National Monument

SR 204 begins at an intersection with SR 3 (Kings Highway) just north of Potomac Mills, the former site of a mill on Popes Creek. The state highway heads straight east-northeast through a forested area with intermittent farmland. As SR 204 approaches George Washington Birthplace National Monument, the state highway passes between fields and is flanked by rows of trees. The state highway reaches its eastern terminus at the entrance to the national monument, just east of which is a four-leg roundabout that contains in its center a replica of the Washington Monument.

== History ==
SR 204 was designated in July 1933. The section from SR 3 to the George Washington Birthplace was a renumbering of State Route 610, and a second section from US 360 north to Oak Row was a renumbering of State Route 609. In August 1933, the southern section extended north to a church 0.7 miles (1.1 km) north of Oak Row. In May 1938, the southern section extended north to SR 623. In April 1949, this southern section was cancelled (it is now SR 624).

== Major intersections ==
The entire route is in Westmoreland County.

Location	mi	km	Destinations	Notes
Wakefield Corner	0.00	0.00	SR 3 (Kings Highway) – Kilmarnock, Fredericksburg	Western terminus
	1.73	2.78	George Washington Birthplace National Monument	Eastern terminus
1.000 mi = 1.609 km; 1.000 km = 0.621 mi

< SR 371	Spurs of SR 37; 1923–1928	SR 373 >
< SR 609	District 6 State Routes; 1928–1933	SR 611 >
