= Fairview Beach, Virginia =

- Census-designated place
- Location in King George County and the state of Virginia
- Coordinates: 38°19′45″N 77°14′31″W
- Country: United States
- State: Virginia
- County: King George

Area
  - Total: 0.29 sq mi (0.75 km^{2})
  - Land: 0.29 sq mi (0.75 km^{2})
  - Water: 0 sq mi (0.0 km^{2})
- Elevation: 9.8 ft (3 m)

Population (2010)
  - Total: 391
  - Density: 1,355/sq mi (523.1/km^{2})
- Time zone: UTC−5 (Eastern (EST))
  - Summer (DST): UTC−4 (EDT)
- FIPS code: 51-27040
- GNIS feature ID: 1495523

Fairview Beach is an unincorporated community and census-designated place (CDP) in King George County, Virginia, United States. As of the 2020 census, Fairview Beach had a population of 376.

== Geography ==
Fairview Beach is located in northwestern King George County at 38°19′45″N 77°14′31″W (38.329155, −77.241928), on the south bank of the Potomac River. Access is via Fairview Drive (state route 696) north from Virginia State Route 218. The community is 7 miles (11 km) north of King George, the county seat, and 6 miles (10 km) northeast of Passapatanzy.

According to the United States Census Bureau, the Fairview Beach CDP has a total area of 0.29 square miles (0.75 km^{2}), all land.

== Demographics ==
Historical population
Census	Pop.	Note	%±
2000	230		—
2020	376		—
U.S. Decennial Census; 2000 2010 2020

Fairview Beach was first listed as a census designated place in the 2000 U.S. census.

As of the census of 2000, there were 230 people, 112 households, and 63 families residing in the CDP. The population density was 1,507.7 people per square mile (592.0/km^{2}). There were 222 housing units at an average density of 1,455.3/sq mi (571.4/km^{2}). The racial makeup of the CDP was 97.39% White, 0.87% Asian, and 1.74% from two or more races.

There were 112 households, out of which 17.9% had children under the age of 18 living with them, 39.3% were married couples living together, 11.6% had a female householder with no husband present, and 43.8% were non-families. 34.8% of all households were made up of individuals, and 8.0% had someone living alone who was 65 years of age or older. The average household size was 2.05 and the average family size was 2.56.

In the CDP, the population was spread out, with 13.9% under the age of 18, 10.0% from 18 to 24, 23.5% from 25 to 44, 30.9% from 45 to 64, and 21.7% who were 65 years of age or older. The median age was 46 years. For every 100 females, there were 107.2 males. For every 100 females age 18 and over, there were 112.9 males.

The median income for a household in the CDP was $47,188, and the median income for a family was $48,056. Males had a median income of $46,528 versus $25,156 for females. The per capita income for the CDP was $22,231. None of the families and 2.8% of the population were living below the poverty line.
