= Virginia State Route 206 =

State highway in King George County, Virginia, US

State Route 206
- Dahlgren Road

Route information
- Maintained by VDOT
- Length: 11.04 mi (17.77 km)
- Existed: 1933–present

Major junctions
- West end: SR 3 at Arnolds Corner
- SR 218 in Berthaville; US 301 at Owens
- East end: SR 604 in Dahlgren

Location
- Country: United States
- State: Virginia
- Counties: King George

Highway system
- Virginia Routes; Interstate; US; Primary; Secondary; Byways; History; HOT lanes
← SR 205	→ SR 207

State Route 206 (SR 206) is a primary state highway in the U.S. state of Virginia. Known as Dahlgren Road, the state highway runs 11.04 miles (17.77 km) from SR 3 at Arnolds Corner east to SR 604 at the entrance to the Naval Surface Warfare Center Dahlgren Division in Dahlgren in eastern King George County.

== Route description ==
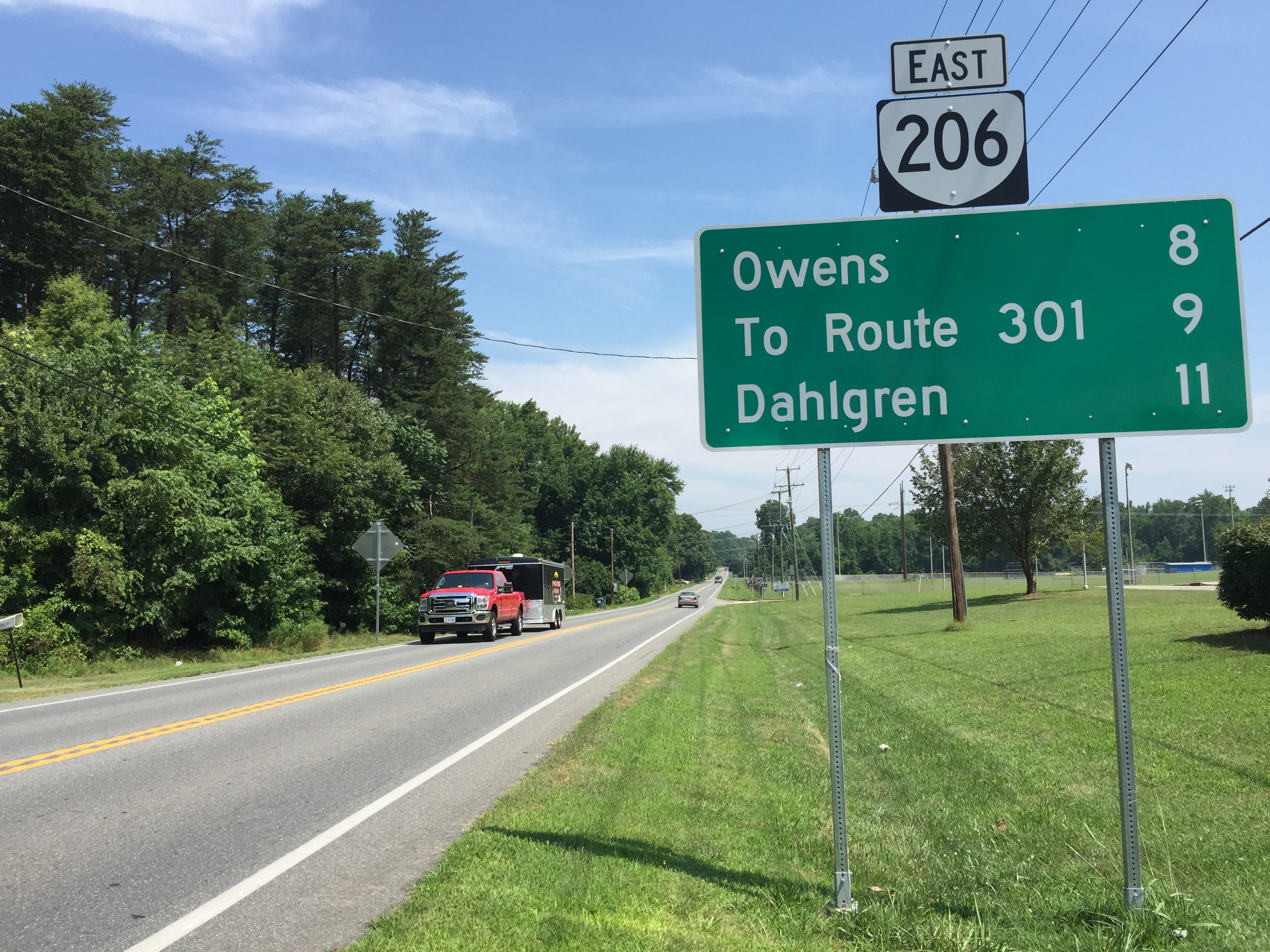
View east along SR 206 at SR 3 in Arnolds Corner

SR 206 begins at an intersection with SR 3 (Kings Highway) at Arnolds Corner a short distance west of King George, the county seat of King George County. The state highway heads northeast along the height of land between Upper Machodoc Creek to the south and Pepper Mill Creek to the north. After passing through Weedonville, SR 206 leaves the short ridge and crosses Pepper Mill Creek to reach Berthaville, where the highway intersects SR 218 (Caledon Road). The two highways run concurrently east to Owens, where SR 218 turns south as Windsor Drive. SR 206 has an oblique intersection with U.S. Route 301 (James Madison Parkway) then crosses Williams Creek into Dahlgren. After passing through the center of the village, the state highway reaches its eastern terminus at its intersection with SR 604 (Twelfth Street). The roadway continues as unnumbered Dahlgren Road through the gate of the Naval Surface Warfare Center Dahlgren Division.

== Major intersections ==
The entire route is in King George County.

Location	mi	km	Destinations	Notes
Arnolds Corner	0.00	0.00	SR 3 (Kings Highway) – Kilmarnock, Fredericksburg, Culpeper	Western terminus
Berthaville	6.44	10.36	SR 218 west (Caledon Road) / SR 632 (St. Pauls Road) – Caledon Natural Area	West end of concurrency with SR 218
Owens	8.63	13.89	SR 218 east (Windsor Drive) / SR 624 (Owens Drive) – Colonial Beach	East end of concurrency with SR 218
	9.25	14.89	US 301 (James Madison Parkway) – Baltimore, Richmond	
Dahlgren	11.04	17.77	SR 604 (Twelfth Street) / Dahlgren Road – Naval Support Facility Dahlgren	Eastern terminus
1.000 mi = 1.609 km; 1.000 km = 0.621 mi

< SR 374	Spurs of SR 37; 1923–1928	SR 376 >
< SR 611	District 6 State Routes; 1928–1933	SR 613 >
