= Potomac Mills (disambiguation) =

Potomac Mills may refer to:

- Potomac Mills (shopping mall) in Woodbridge, Virginia
- Potomac Mills, Prince William County, Virginia
- Potomac Mills, Westmoreland County, Virginia
- Potomac Mills (Shepherdstown, West Virginia)
