= Osso =

Osso may refer to:

- Alessandro Osso (born 1987), Italian footballer
- Osso, Virginia, unincorporated community in King George County, Virginia, United States of America
