= St. Paul's Episcopal Church (King George, Virginia) =

Historic church in Virginia, US

- St. Paul's Church
- U.S. National Register of Historic Places
- Virginia Landmarks Register
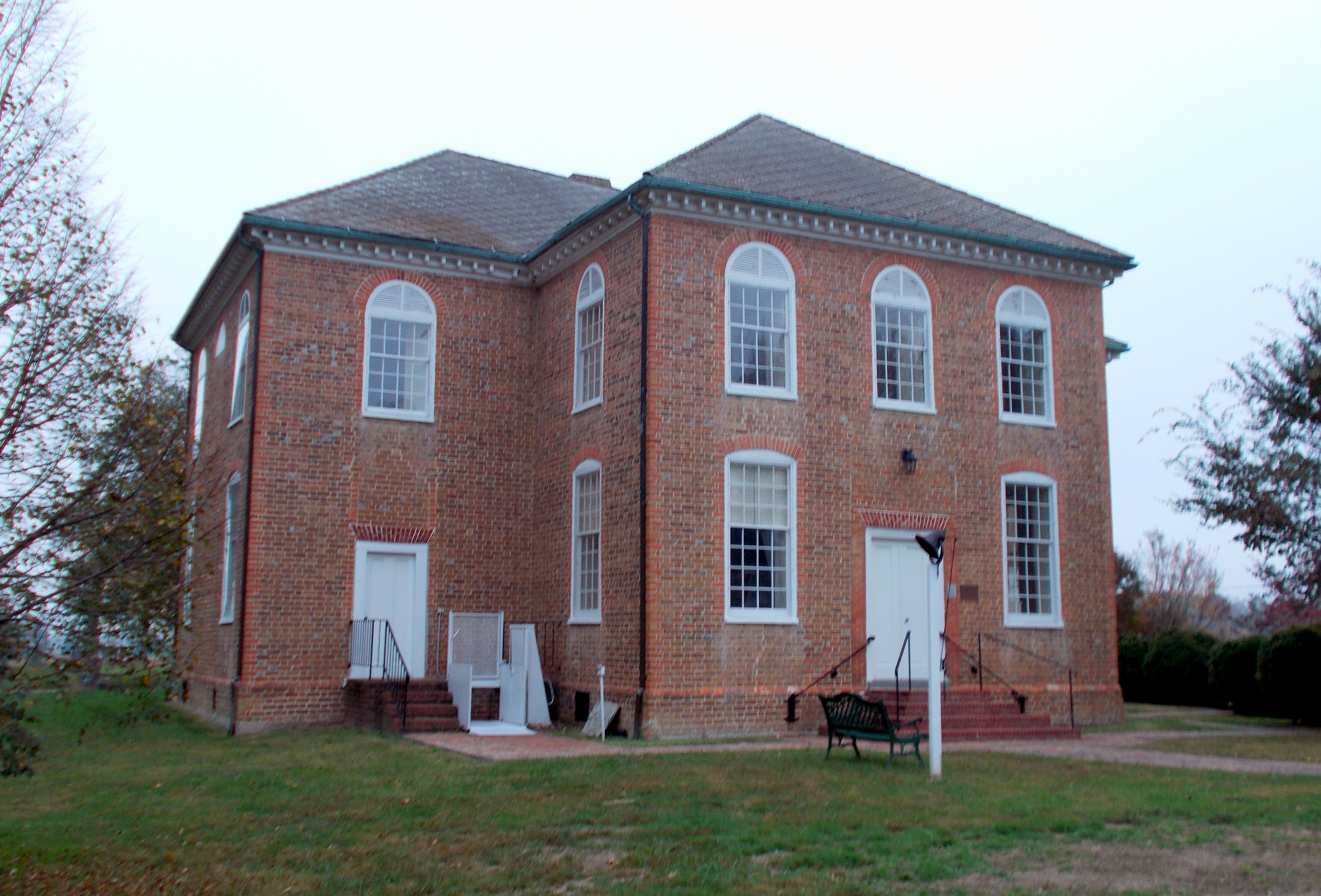
- St. Paul's Episcopal Church, October 2012

- Location within Virginia Location within the United States
- Location: 5486 St. Paul's Road, Owens, Virginia
- Coordinates: 38°19′56″N 77°08′30″W
- Area: 10 acres (4.0 ha)
- Built: ca. 1766
- Architectural style: Colonial
- NRHP reference No.: 73002028
- VLR No.: 048-0021

Significant dates
- Added to NRHP: May 25, 1973
- Designated VLR: January 16, 1973

St. Paul's Episcopal Church, built in the late 1760s, is a historic Episcopal church located at 5486 St. Paul's Road, off Virginia Route 206 in the Owens area of King George, Virginia, United States. It is the parish church of historic St. Paul's Parish which was formed in the early 1660s. On May 25, 1973, St. Paul's was added to the National Register of Historic Places.

== National Register listing ==
- St. Paul's Church ** (added 1973 - Building - #73002028)
- W of Owens off VA 206, Owens
- Historic Significance: Event, Architecture/Engineering
- Architect, builder, or engineer: Unknown
- Architectural Style: Colonial
- Area of Significance: Architecture, Religion
- Period of Significance: 1750-1799
- Owner: Private
- Historic Function: Religion
- Historic Sub-function: Religious Structure
- Current Function: Religion
- Current Sub-function: Religious Structure

== Current use ==
St. Paul's Church is still in use as a parish of the Episcopal Diocese of Virginia. The rector of the parish is the Reverend (Padre) Lee Gandiya.

== See also ==
- List of Registered Historic Places in Virginia, Counties H-M
- St. Paul's Episcopal Church (disambiguation)

== Gallery ==
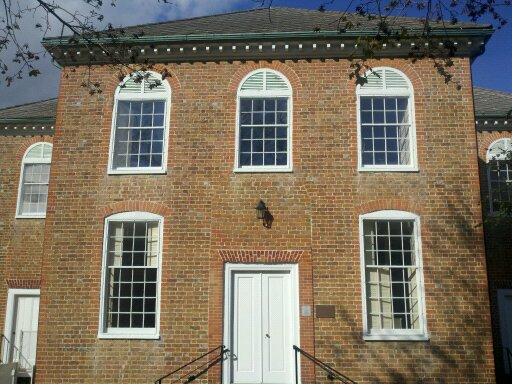
Entrance detail

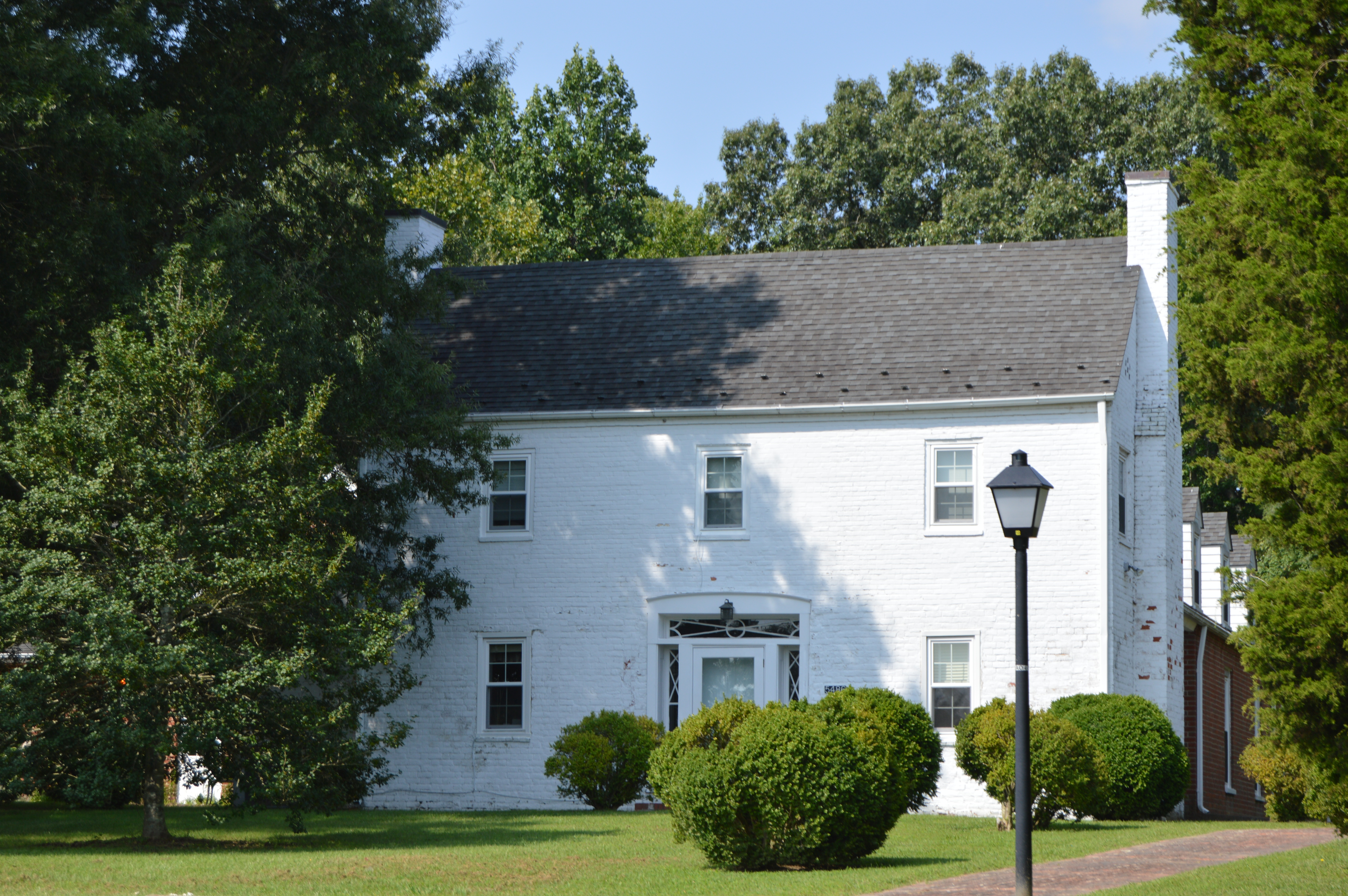
Parish house
