= Berthaville, Virginia =

Unincorporated community in Virginia, United States

- Unincorporated community
- Location within Virginia and the United States Berthaville (the United States)
- Coordinates: 38°20′0″N 77°7′33″W
- Country: United States
- State: Virginia
- County: King George
- Time zone: UTC−5 (Eastern (EST))
  - Summer (DST): UTC−4 (EDT)

Berthaville is an unincorporated community in King George County, Virginia, United States. Berthaville developed as an agricultural community in the nineteenth century at the crossroads of Caledon Road (VA 218), Dahlgren Road (VA 206/VA 218), and Saint Paul's Road (VA Secondary 655).
