= Bell House (Colonial Beach, Virginia) =

Historic house in Virginia, United States

- U.S. National Register of Historic Places
- Virginia Landmarks Register
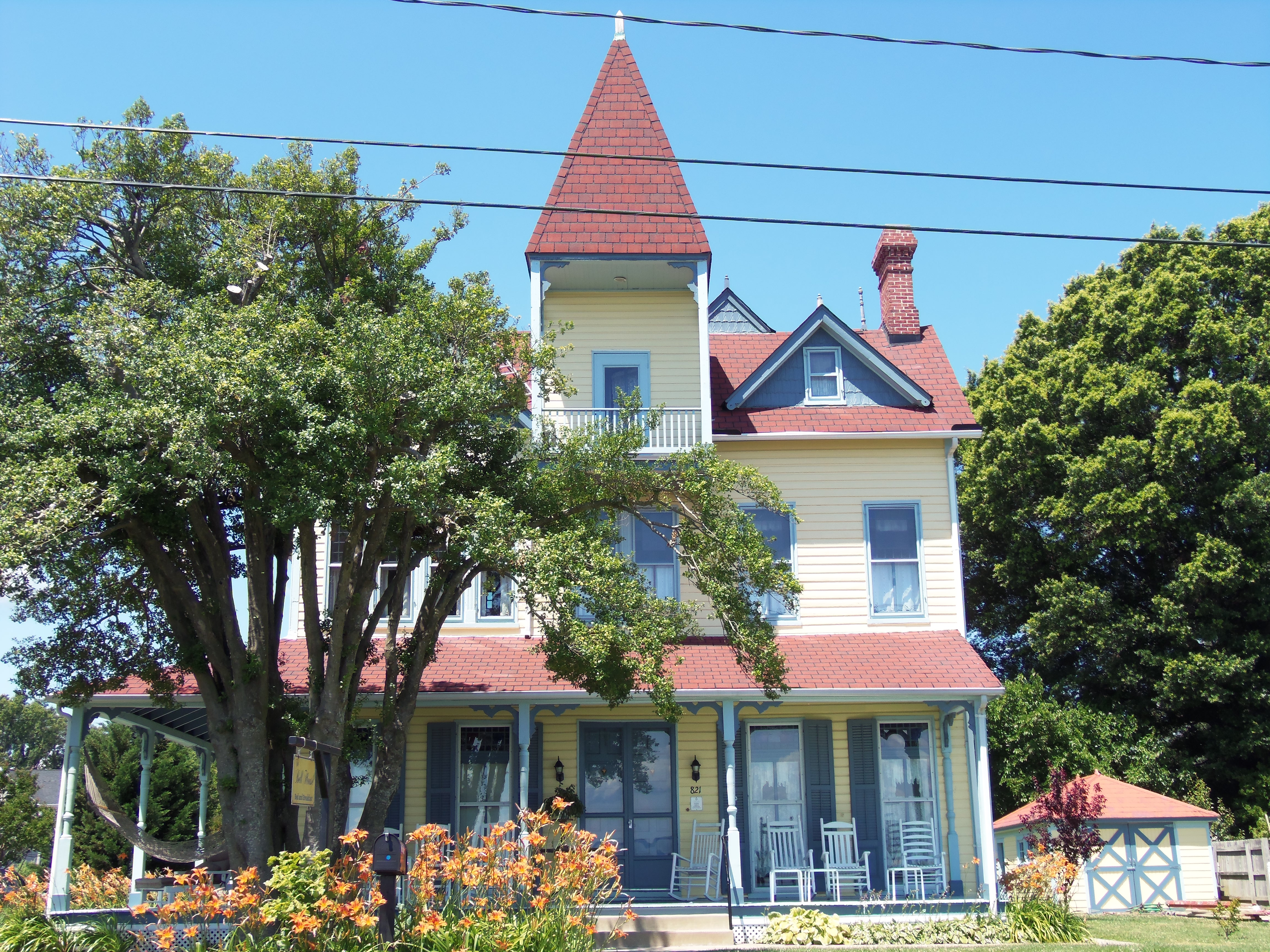
- Bell House, June 2012

- Location within Virginia Location within the United States
- Location: 821 Irving Ave., Colonial Beach, Virginia
- Coordinates: 38°14′27″N 76°57′30″W
- Area: 0.5 acres (0.20 ha)
- Built: 1883-1885
- Architectural style: Stick/eastlake
- NRHP reference No.: 87000692
- VLR No.: 199-0003

Significant dates
- Added to NRHP: September 21, 1987
- Designated VLR: March 17, 1987

Bell House, also known as the summer home of Alexander Graham Bell, is a historic home located at Colonial Beach, Westmoreland County, Virginia. It is a 2 1/2-story, five-bay Stick Style frame dwelling originally built between 1883 and 1885 for Helen and Colonel J.O.P Burnside. It features a wraparound porch with turned posts and sawn brackets and a central projecting tower with a pyramidal roof and balcony overhang. Also on the property are a contributing privy and garage (c. 1930). Alexander Graham Bell inherited the property in 1907 from his father Alexander Melville Bell, who acquired it in 1886, and held it continuously until 1918.

It was listed on the National Register of Historic Places in 1987.
