= Passapatanzy, Virginia =

Unincorporated community in Virginia, United States

- Census-designated place
- Location in King George County and the state of Virginia
- Coordinates: 38°17′50″N 77°18′51″W
- Country: United States
- State: Virginia
- County: King George

Area
  - Total: 2.04 sq mi (5.28 km^{2})
  - Land: 2.03 sq mi (5.27 km^{2})
  - Water: 0.0039 sq mi (0.01 km^{2})
- Elevation: 214 ft (65 m)

Population (2010)
  - Total: 1,283
  - Density: 630/sq mi (243.3/km^{2})
- Time zone: UTC−5 (Eastern (EST))
  - Summer (DST): UTC−4 (EDT)
- ZIP code: 22485 (King George)
- Area code: 540
- FIPS code: 51-60888
- GNIS feature ID: 1497075

Passapatanzy is an unincorporated community and census-designated place (CDP) in King George County, Virginia, United States. As of the 2020 census, Passapatanzy had a population of 1,244.

== History ==
It was recorded as a Patawomeck village ruled by Japazaws, elder brother of the weroance. He conspired with the English adventurer and sea captain, Samuel Argall, who planned to capture Chief Powhatan's daughter, Pocahontas on April 13, 1613, to use as a hostage in English negotiations with Powhatan. They wanted captives and property returned.

According to Mattaponi and Patawomeck tradition, Pocahontas was residing there with her husband, Kocoum. Their daughter, Ka-Okee, survived, cared for by other Patawomeck people after Kocoum's death. A historic marker about this incident stands near the Potomac Creek Bridge on U.S. Route 1 in Stafford.

== Geography ==
Passapatanzy is in western King George County, along Virginia State Route 218, which leads west 9 miles (14 km) to Fredericksburg and east 15 miles (24 km) to U.S. Route 301 at Dahlgren. King George, the county seat, is 10 miles (16 km) to the southeast.

According to the U.S. Census Bureau, the Passapatanzy CDP has a total area of 2.0 square miles (5.3 km^{2}), of which 0.004 square miles (0.01 km^{2}), or 0.20%, are water.

== Demographics ==
Historical population
Census	Pop.	Note	%±
2010	1,283		—
2020	1,244		−3.0%
U.S. Decennial Census; 2010 2020

Passapatanzy was first listed as a census designated place in the 2010 U.S. census.
