= Edgehill, King George County, Virginia =

Unincorporated community in Virginia, United States

- Unincorporated community
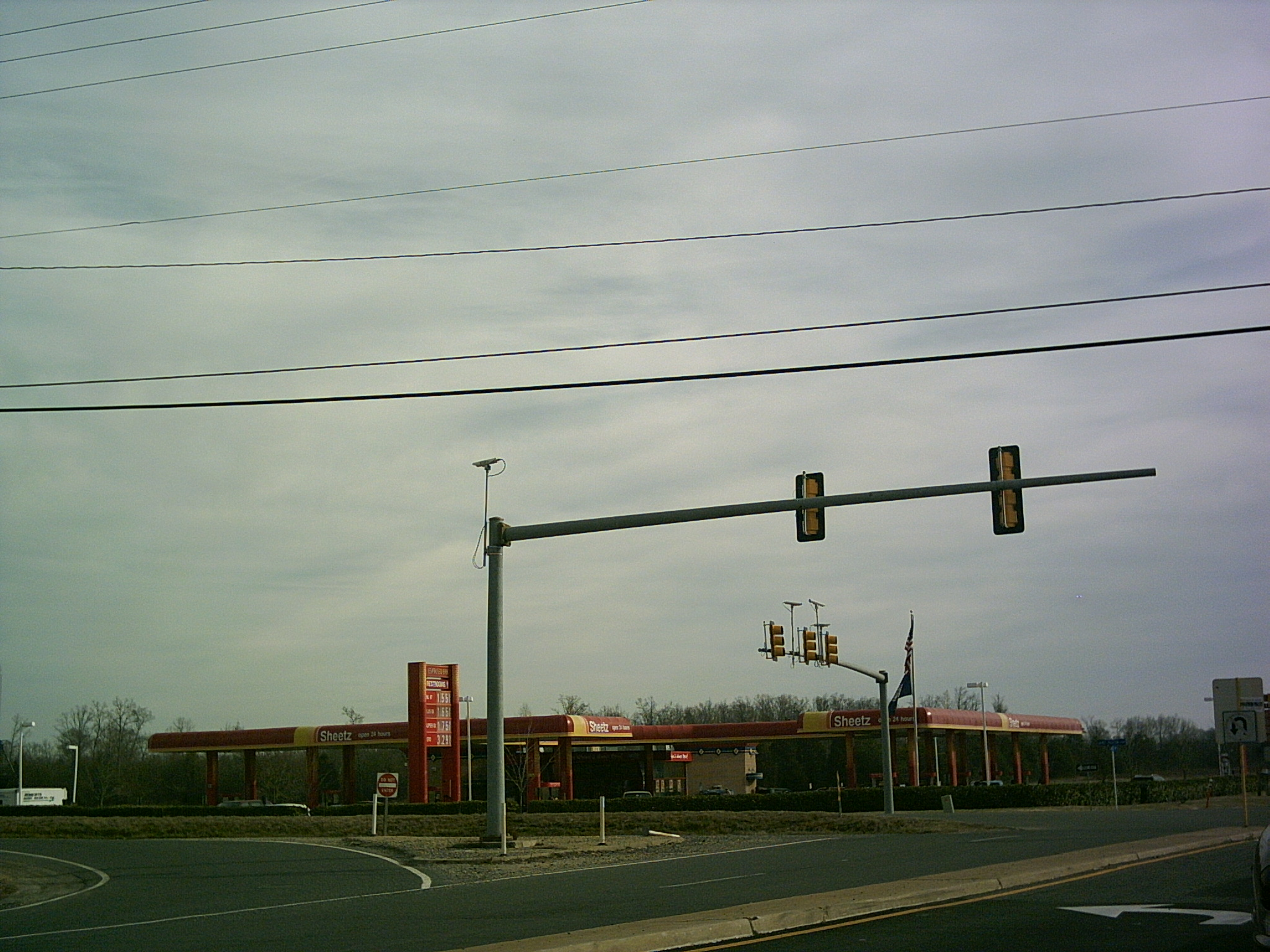
- Central intersection in Edgehill

- Location within Virginia and the United States Edgehill (the United States)
- Coordinates: 38°15′53″N 77°8′37″W
- Country: United States
- State: Virginia
- County: King George
- Time zone: UTC−5 (Eastern (EST))
  - Summer (DST): UTC−4 (EDT)

Edgehill is an unincorporated community in King George County, Virginia, United States. The main roads in Office Hall are U.S. Route 301 and Virginia State Route 205.
