= Popes Creek (Virginia) =

Stream in Virginia, USA

Pope's Creek
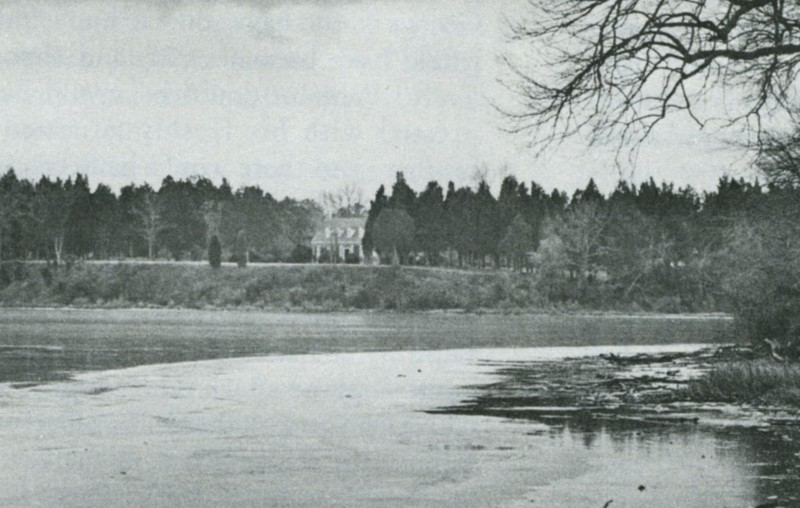
- The waters of Pope's Creek from across the cove showing the 20th century Memorial House

Location
- Country: United States
- State: Virginia
- County: Westmoreland County

Physical characteristics
- Mouth
  - location: Potomac River
  - elevation: 0 feet (0 m)
- Length: 5.3 mi (8.5 km)

Pope's Creek is a 5.3-mile-long (8.5 km) tidal tributary of the Potomac River in Westmoreland County, Virginia. The George Washington Birthplace National Monument lies along the north side of Popes Creek. Popes Creek landing is located at 38°11′29″N 76°54′16″W.

== Variant names ==
The following variant names have been listed on the Geographic Names Information System by the United States Geological Survey.

- Cedar Creek
- Cedar Island Creek
- Fishing Creek
- Mister Pope's Creek
- Pope Creek
- Pope's Creek

== History ==
Hercules Bridges, Henry Brooks, John Quigley and Nathaniel Pope were the early patentees of the Mattox Neck area (of three creeks, Mattox, Bridges, Popes) destined to become part of Westmoreland County, known as Virginia's Northern Neck, or as known in colonial days, the "Athens of the New World". The name is not directly linked to the Pope of Rome in any sense.

== Watershed ==
The mouth of Popes Creek is plugged by a flood-tide delta making it an efficient trap for sediment and enriched run-off from three primary sources: farmed watersheds consisting of broad terraces and open upland slopes, erosion of the bluffs and beaches of the Potomac, and the creek bluff erosion itself. Agriculturally derived fill deposited in adjacent ravines to a depth of 2 meters is found covering stumps from the 17th century. Beaver dams and ponds dot the flood plains as well as several old mill ponds which interrupt the flow. Historically, the navigation of the creek has been limited to shallow-draft vessels with present depth up to one meter augmented by 0.3 to 0.4 meter tide. The tributary continues to shoal as the sea level rises driving Potomac silt more than a kilometer inland. Core drilling in the delta has indicated 15 meters of mollusk-bearing sediment, over peat and sand deposits dating back over 6000 years. The taking of oysters is abundantly evident. Aboriginal shell middens were found during archeological excavations, post structure and land preparation for the Visitors’ Center at the site of George Washington’s birthplace. The 18th century refuse pit at the birthplace containing food garbage yielded shucked oyster shells as well. Fishing at the creek mouth is highlighted by the white perch run. In Captain John Smith’s explorations the fish were so thick their heads stuck out of water, prompting his men to attempt to catch them in a frying pan. The entrance to the smaller estuaries would be clogged during spring migrations including shad runs. Later colonial inventories of the Popes Creek plantation list seine corks, lead, seine rope, a knot of perch lines, yielding to the more than adequate kitchen utensil, or fish kettle, serving up the local delicacy.

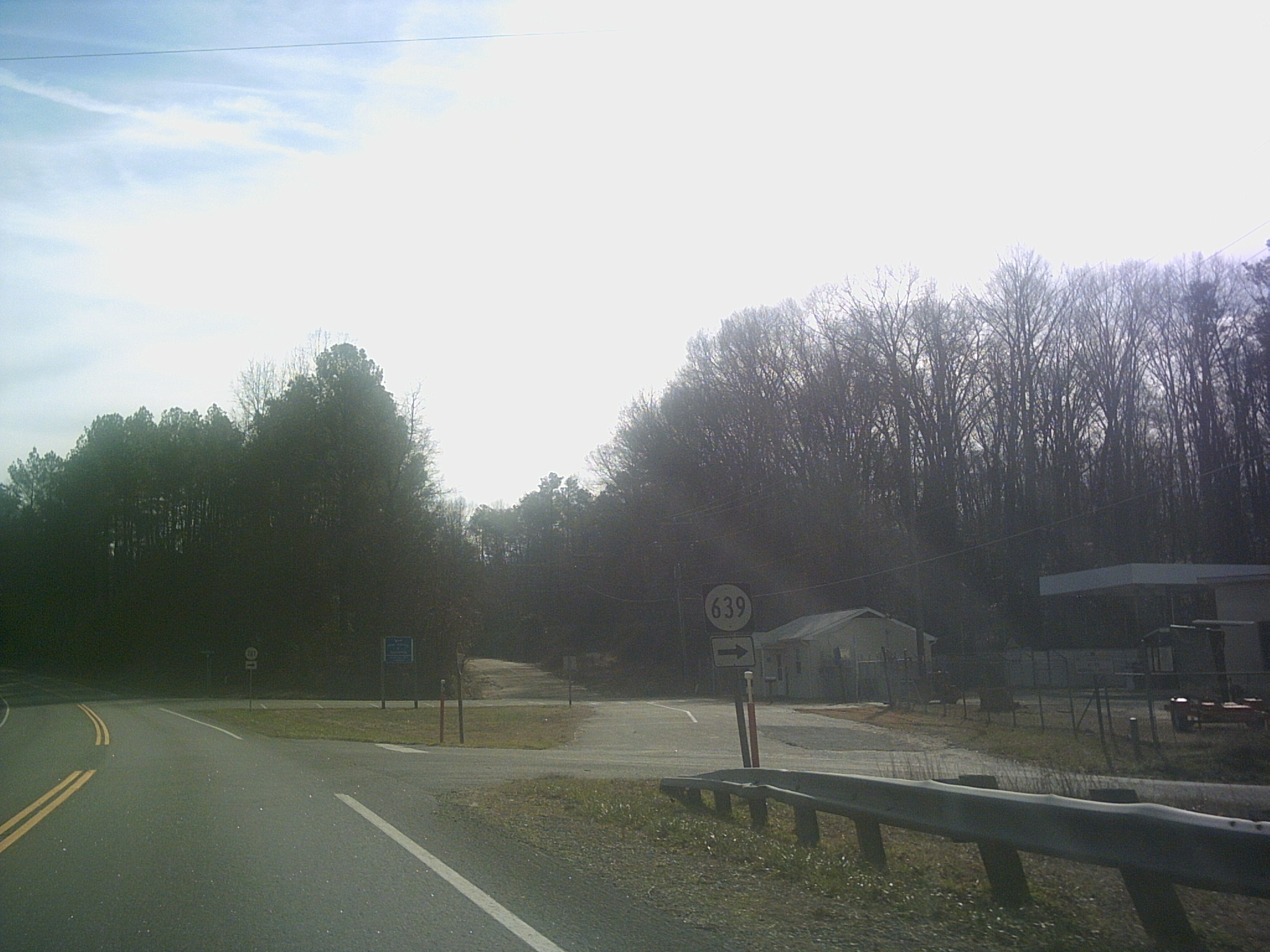
Modern-day facilities in the community of Popes Creek, including a Virginia Department of Transportation service depot

In June, July, and August 2007, the Virginia Department of Environmental Quality reported a large fish kill resulting from an algal bloom, primarily the Karlodinium type, that stretched from Colonial Beach (the closest town) to Mattox Creek to Muses Beach (Popes Creek) to Stratford Hall Plantation on the Potomac River. Early reports of dead fish on June 18, enumerating species involved, estimated hundreds of hogchoker at Muses Beach and hundreds of gizzard shad at Stratford Hall. The highest concentration of the characteristic reddish-brown toxin was located 4 miles (6 km) below the mouth of Mattox Creek on July 17. The number of fish killed at Mattox Creek was 296,000 with approximately 56 percent young menhaden, 30 percent white perch, and 12 percent croaker. Other species seen in the kill were gizzard shad, mummichog, white and channel catfish, young American eel, hogchoker, largemouth bass and blue crabs.

== See also ==
- List of Virginia rivers
