= Owens, Virginia =

Unincorporated community in Virginia, United States

- Unincorporated community
- US 301 at VA 206 in Owens, January 2004

- Location within Virginia and the United States Owens (the United States)
- Coordinates: 38°20′19″N 77°5′11″W
- Country: United States
- State: Virginia
- County: King George
- Elevation: 138 ft (42 m)
- Time zone: UTC−5 (Eastern (EST))
  - Summer (DST): UTC−4 (EDT)
- GNIS feature ID: 1471988

Owens is a small unincorporated crossroads community at the intersection of Dahlgren Road, Windsor Drive, and Owens Drive in King George County, Virginia, United States. State Routes 206 and 218 meet at this intersection, with 206 going east towards U.S. Route 301 and Dahlgren, 218 going south towards US 301 and Colonial Beach and 206 and 218 joined together going west towards Arnolds Corner and Fredericksburg. The eastern part of the community is within the Dahlgren census-designated place.

Owens comprises under a dozen houses and businesses along Dahlgren Road, including what was once Peyton's Market and the Owens Post Office, now an antiques store, as well as a small community of houses along Owens Drive, and the cemetery of Oakland Baptist Church which is on the western corner of Dahlgren Road and Windsor Drive. The church was located there until 1967, when it moved to its present location on US 301. Also about 3/4 mile is another church on Owens Drive named Little Ark Baptist Church. The Church was established in the 19th century. The community is located within the Northern Neck George Washington Birthplace American Viticultural Area winemaking appellation.

St. Paul's Episcopal Church was listed on the National Register of Historic Places in 1973.
