= St. Paul's Protestant Episcopal Church =

St. Paul's Protestant Episcopal Church may refer to:

in the United States

(by state)

- St. Paul's Episcopal Church (Georgetown, Delaware), listed on the NRHP in Delaware
- St. Paul's Protestant Episcopal Church (Baltimore, Maryland), listed on the NRHP in Maryland
- St. Paul's by-the-sea Protestant Episcopal Church, Ocean City, Worcester County, Maryland, listed on the NRHP in Maryland
- St. Paul's Protestant Episcopal Church (Tulls Corner, Maryland), listed on the NRHP in Maryland
- St. Paul's Church (Carroll Gardens, Brooklyn), New York, listed on the NRHP in New York

== See also ==
- St. Paul's Church (disambiguation)
- St. Paul's Episcopal Church (disambiguation)
