= Mustoe (surname) =

Mustoe is a surname. Notable people with the surname include:

- Anne Mustoe (1933–2009), English cyclist and writer
- Jordan Mustoe (born 1991), English footballer
- Lyndon Mustoe (born 1969), Welsh rugby union player
- Neil Mustoe (born 1976), English footballer
- Richard Mustoe (born 1981), Welsh rugby union player
- Robbie Mustoe (born 1968), English footballer, manager and commentator
- William Robert Mustoe (1878–1942), English landscape gardener
