= St. Paul's Episcopal Church (Royalton, Vermont) =

Historic church in Vermont, United States

- U.S. National Register of Historic Places
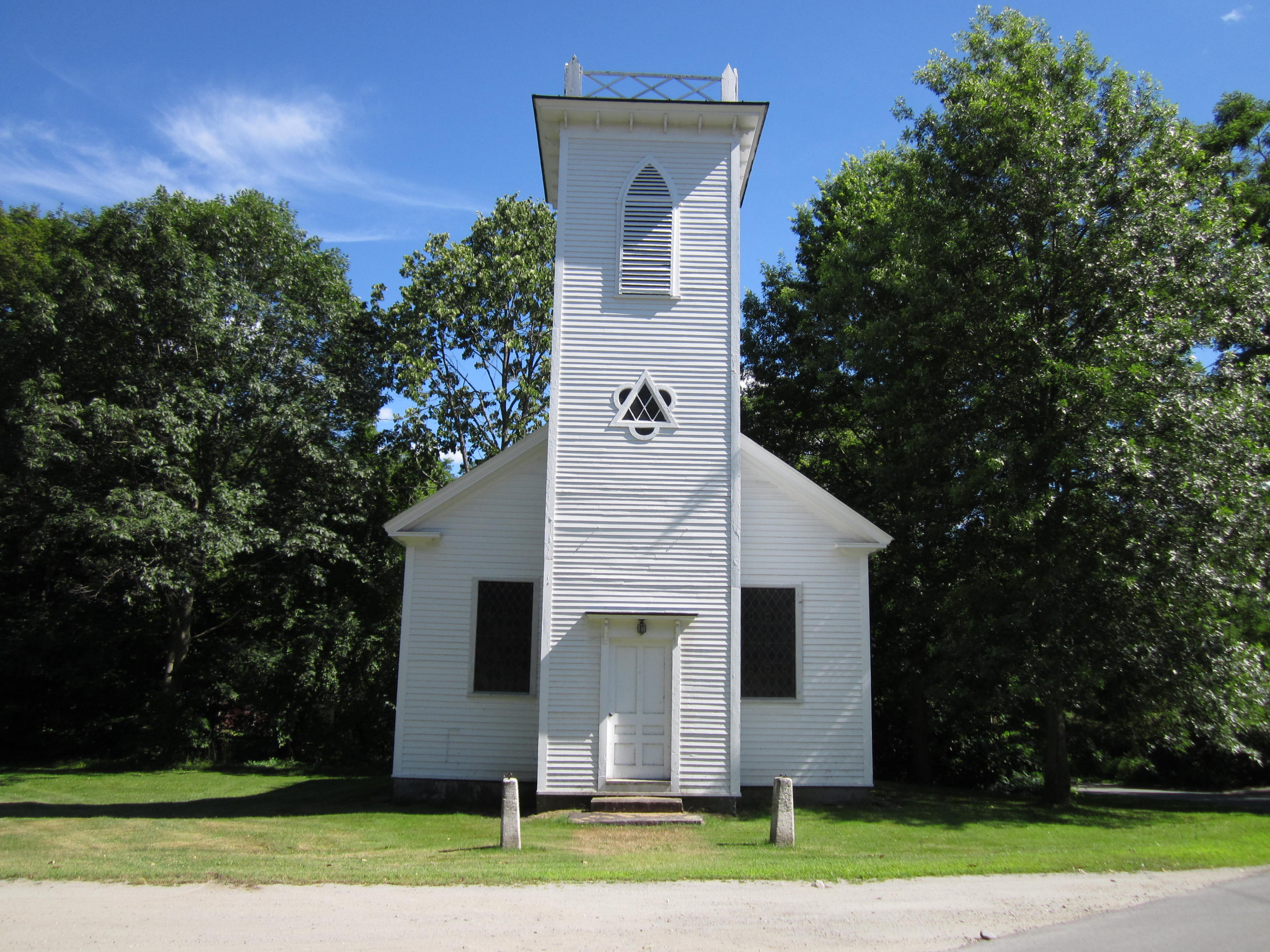

- Location within Vermont Location within the United States
- Location: Jct. of Bridge St. and VT 14, Royalton, Vermont
- Coordinates: 43°48′55″N 72°32′48″W
- Area: less than one acre
- Built: 1836
- Architectural style: Gothic Revival
- MPS: Religious Buildings, Sites and Structures in Vermont MPS
- NRHP reference No.: 01000214
- Added to NRHP: March 2, 2001

St. Paul's Episcopal Church is a historic church building at Bridge Street and Vermont Route 14 in Royalton, Vermont. Built in 1836, it is a prominent early example of Gothic Revival architecture in the state, and is one of the oldest surviving public buildings in Royalton's historic village center. Now deconsecrated and maintained by the Royalton Historical Society, it was listed on the National Register of Historic Places in 2001.

== Description and history ==
St. Paul's Episcopal Church stands on the east side of the junction of Bridge Street and Route 14, near the center of Royalton's historic early village center. It is a single-story wood-frame structure, with a gabled roof, clapboarded exterior, and stone foundation. A three-story square tower projects from the center of the front facade, topped by a flat roof with a broad bracketed cornice with a balustrade above. The belfry stage features Gothic-arched louvered openings. The main entrance is in the base of the tower, framed by pilasters and a cornice. A small trinity window is set above the entrance. The interior space, although now missing some of its religious trapping due to its deconsecration, retains a number distinctive 19th-century features, including stencilwork on the walls and cornice, an 1840s pipe organ, and kerosene light fixtures.

The church was built in 1836, and was probably based on plans supplied by John Henry Hopkins, the first bishop of the Episcopal Diocese of Vermont and an early proponent of the Gothic Revival style. Its c. 1842 organ was built by William Nutting, Jr., a self-taught organ maker from nearby Bethel. Much of the building's stained glass dates to the 1880s and later, when the interior underwent some restyling to meet Victorian fashion trends. The congregation was always relatively small, and typically shared a minister with other nearby churches. Public outcry stopped one call for its deconsecration in the early 1970s, but it was finally closed by the diocese in 1996. The building was then acquired by the Royalton Historical Society, which maintains it as a community resource.

== See also ==
- National Register of Historic Places listings in Windsor County, Vermont
