= Mattox Bridge, Virginia =

Unincorporated community in Virginia, US

Coordinates: 38°12′12″N 77°00′29″W

Mattox Bridge is an unincorporated community in Westmoreland County, in the U. S. state of Virginia.
