= Monroe Bay =

Coordinates: 38°14′16″N 76°58′02″W

Monroe Bay is a protected body of water in Colonial Beach, Virginia that connects at its south end to the Potomac River which is more than six miles wide in Colonial Beach. The bay is approximately two miles long and one third mile wide and features numerous marinas and private piers providing a safe harbor for boaters to the open waters of the Potomac River. Both powerboats and sailboats are frequently seen in the bay.

In addition to boating, recreational activities on the bay include fishing, crabbing, canoeing, kayaking, and the like. The bay offers scenic water views from the many homes that line its shores.

Most of the development along the shores of the bay consists of single family homes of various styles and sizes. However two townhome communities, Monroe Point and Monroe Landing also line its shores. Monroe Landing is a community of 28 townhomes constructed in 1990. Monroe Point is a new townhome community that is currently under construction. To date more than 70 waterfront and waterview homes have been constructed but more than 100 homes remain to be built. The community offers private piers and a one mile long nature trail.
