= St. Paul's Episcopal Church (Troy, New York) =

Historic church in New York, United States

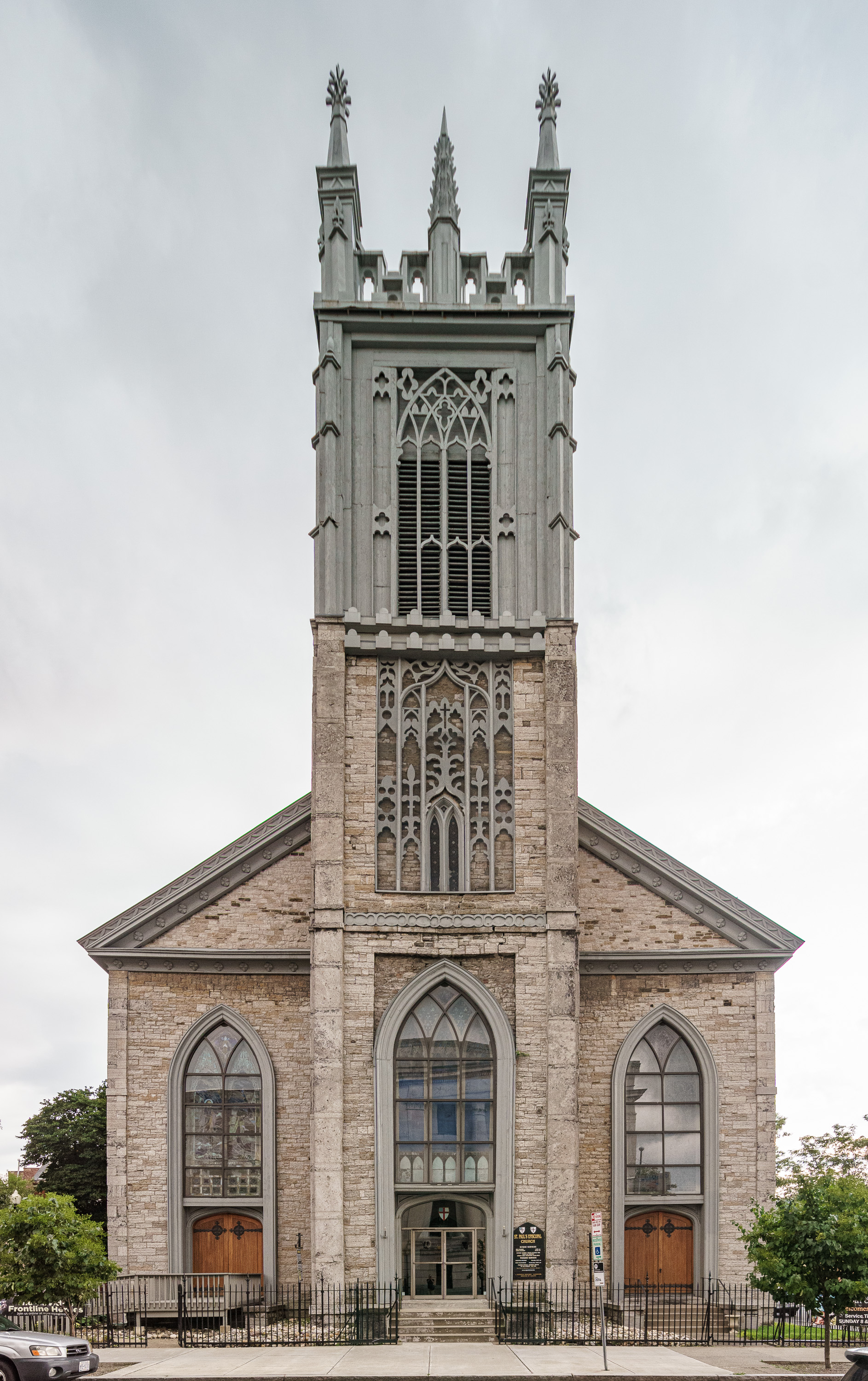
- West (front) elevation and south profile, 2009

Religion
- Affiliation: Episcopal Church in the United States of America
- Leadership: The Rev. Michael Gorchov, rector
- Year consecrated: 1828

Location
- Location: Troy, NY, United States
- Interactive map of St. Paul's Episcopal Church
- Coordinates: 42°43′49″N 73°41′24″W

Architecture
- Type: Church
- Style: Gothic Revival
- Groundbreaking: 1827
- Completed: 1828

Specifications
- Direction of façade: West
- Spire height: 100 feet (30 m)
- Materials: Limestone

U.S. National Register of Historic Places
- Added to NRHP: September 7, 1979
- NRHP Reference no.: 79001624

Website
- St. Paul's Church in Troy, NY

St. Paul's Episcopal Church in Troy, New York, United States, is located at Third (northbound US 4) and State streets. It is home to one of the oldest congregations in the city. In 1979, the church and two outbuildings were added to the National Register of Historic Places. Seven years later, when the Central Troy Historic District was created and added to the Register, it was listed as a contributing property.

St. Paul's is one of the oldest churches in Troy; the first Episcopal services were held in 1795. In 1804 St. Paul's was incorporated and a brick church erected. This was replaced in 1827-28 with the current structure. The exterior is a close copy of Trinity Church, New Haven, Connecticut (1813-1816), designed by the architect Ithiel Town in the Gothic revival style. Indeed, due to changes in the original, St Paul's is closer to Trinity's original appearance than Trinity itself. Today, the exterior of St Paul's is remarkably unchanged, but the interior underwent complete redesign in the 1890s. Balconies had caused structural problems, and the Rector, Dr. Edgar Enos, convinced the church to fund a complete interior renovation by the Louis Comfort Tiffany Company.

St. Paul's is unusual because all aspects of the design are based on a concept by the Tiffany Company: chandeliers, glass mosaics, tile work, a glass jeweled altar rail, a baptistery of wood and plaster filigree, decorative stenciling of the ceiling, walls and organ pipes, pews and support members, stunning windows by Tiffany and Tiffany artisan J.A. Holzer - indeed, nearly all interior elements. As such it is a fully integrated interior design; only four such churches done by the Tiffany Company have survived intact, and St. Paul's is arguably the finest expression of this concept.

== Church complex ==
There are three buildings on the church's lot. The church is supplemented by the Guild House to the east, and the Martha Memorial House attached to the northeast corner serves as the parish offices.

The church itself is rectangular in shape, five bays long by three wide. It is faced in limestone blocks laid in a random ashlar pattern with dressed pilasters at the corners. There are five lancet windows along the south profile and four along the north. Both the west and east facades have three similar windows apiece. A horizontal course connects all the north and south windows at the lancet's spring. The roofline is marked by a decorated wooden cornice. A hundred-foot-high (30 m) tower rises from 12 feet (4 m) above the main entrance on the western facade. Inside its crenellated top is a 2,200-pound (1,000 kg) bell.

The front entrance doubles as the Wayside Chapel. Inside the plate glass doors, the church's sanctuary divides its pews with three aisles. Chandeliers illuminate each section, and a colored -glass lamp hangs over the altar. The high ceiling is supported with wooden trusses; they and the clerestory screens are carved and decorated with gold-tone aluminum leaf.

The Guild House, originally the Parish House, is a three-story three-bay limestone building meant to be sympathetic to the church to its west. Its interior woodwork and windows are original, although other renovations have taken place. The Martha Memorial House is similar in size and shape but faced in brick. It has been more extensively modernized, but a second-floor chapel is intact as are its windows, woodwork and a staircase.

=== Aesthetics ===
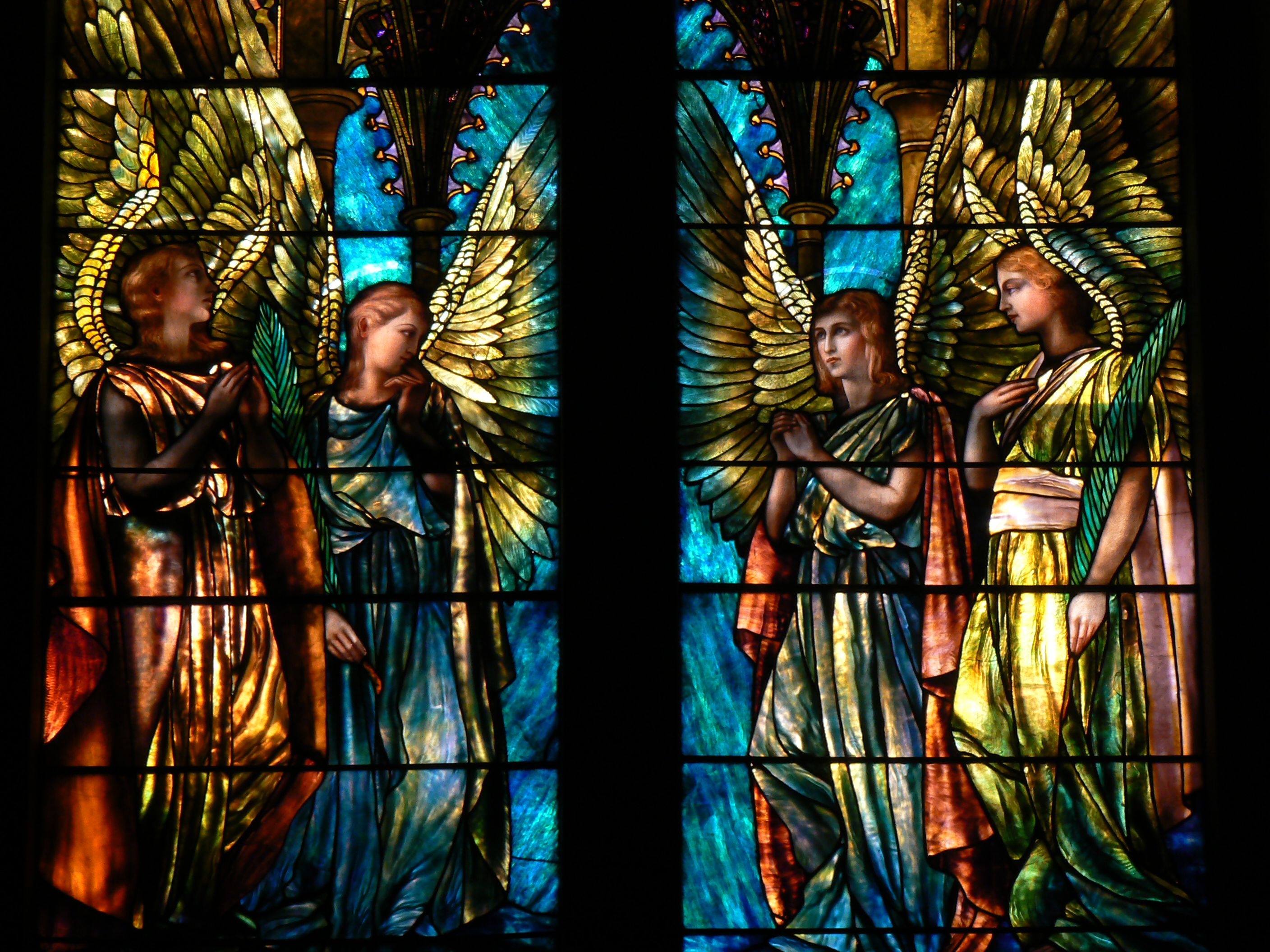
Angelic stained glass window

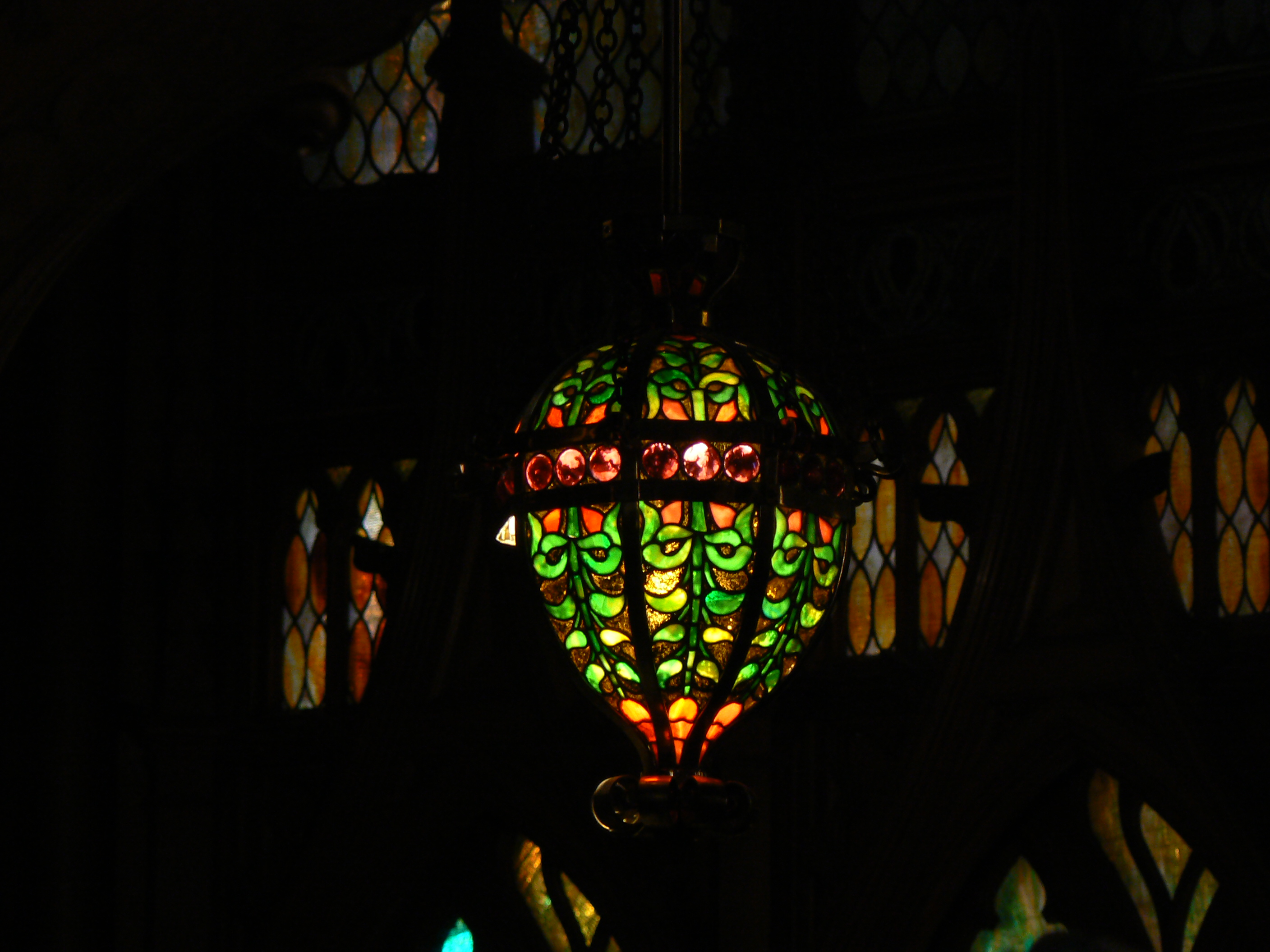
Tiffany decoration

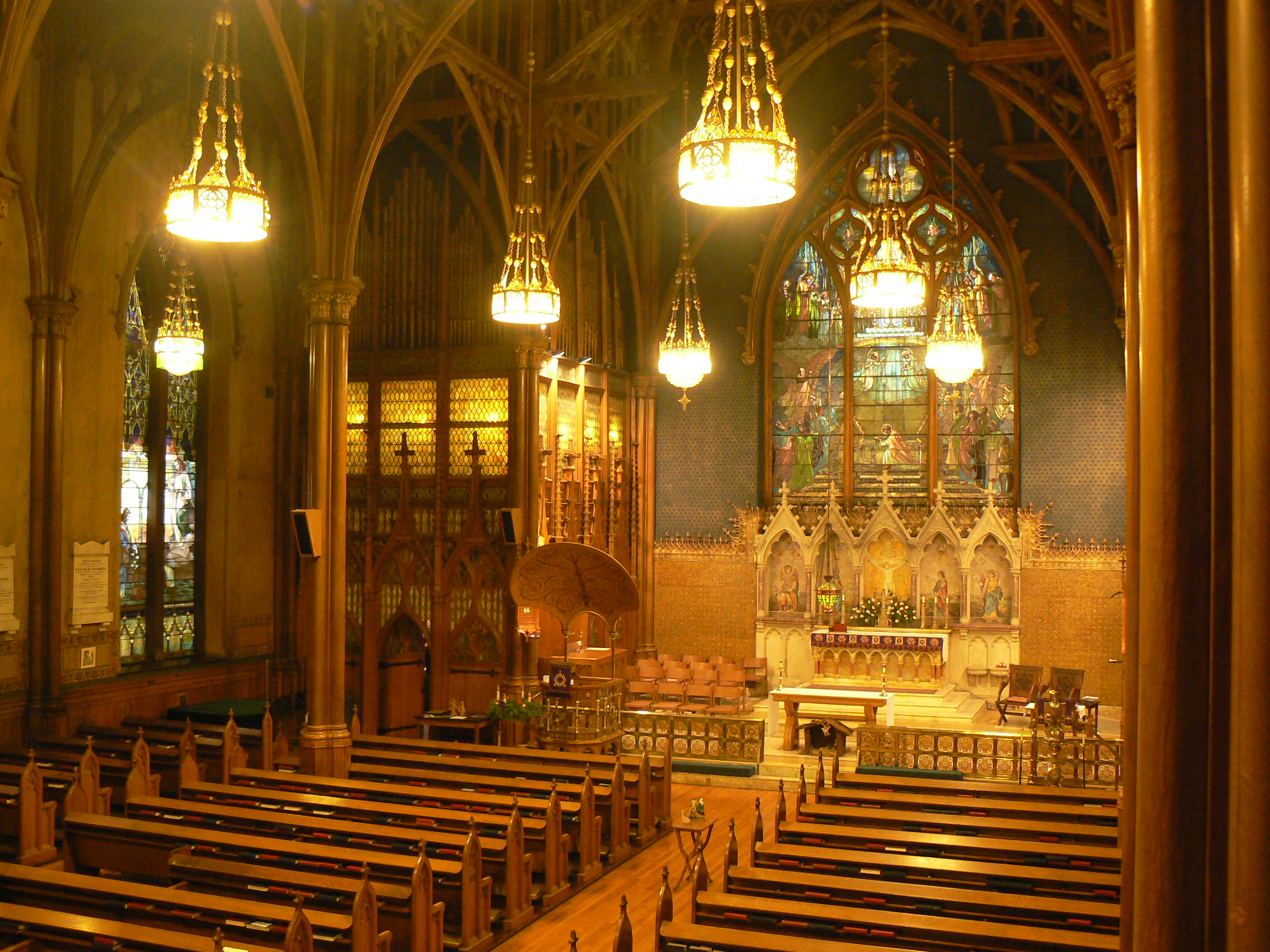
View of the interior

The building's original decoration was believed at the time to be consistent with a house of worship. It also shows the influence of 16th-century English churches and, in its rough surfacing and irregular masonry, a touch of the contemporary Picturesque styling.

It resembles Town's Trinity Church in every way save the use of a different stone in a different color. Since Trinity's tower has been replaced since it was built, it now reflects the original appearance of Trinity more than Trinity itself does.

The Tiffany redesign and renovation have created a remarkable example of an integrated high Victorian interior.

== History ==
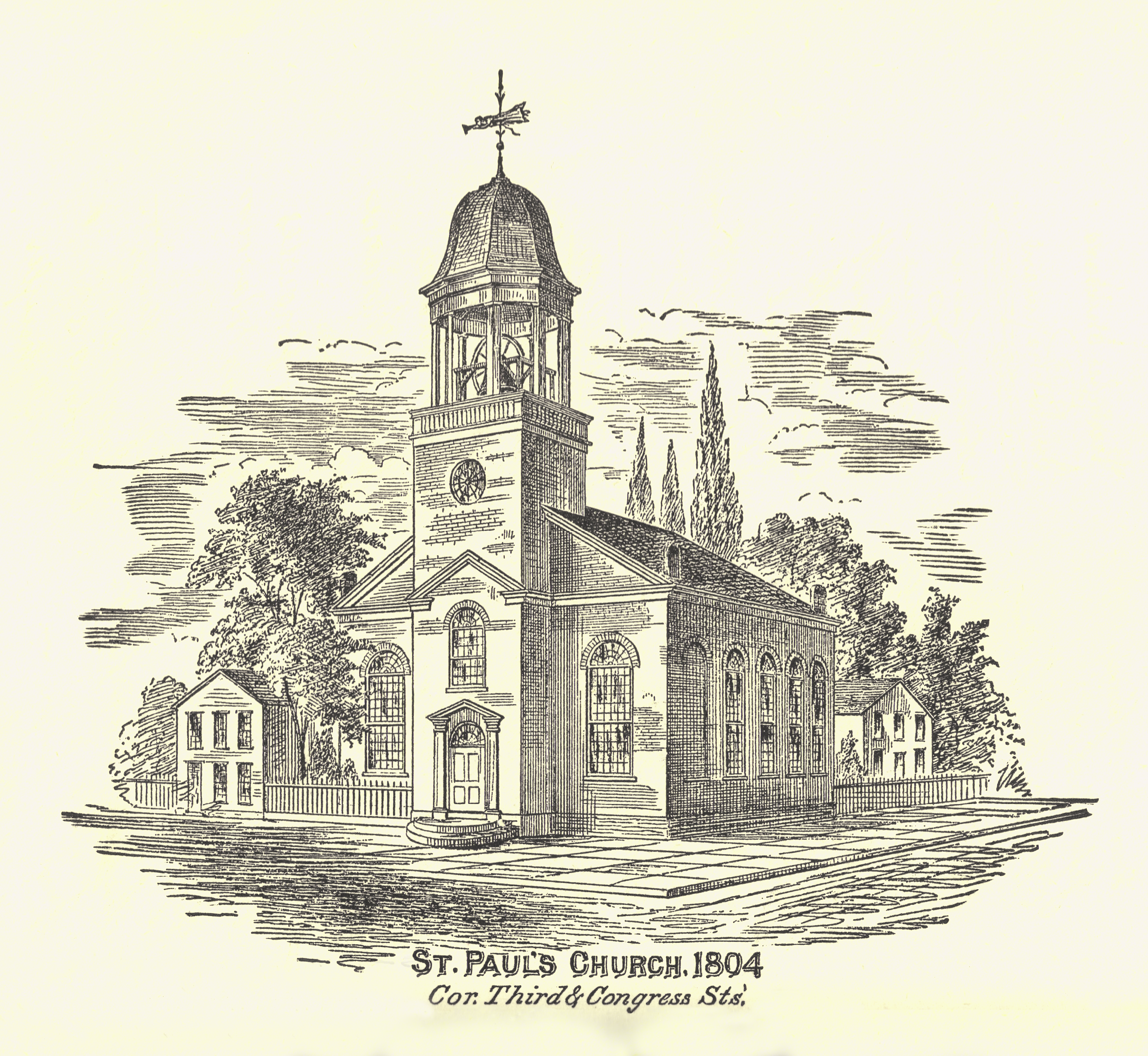
The original church at Third and Congress Streets

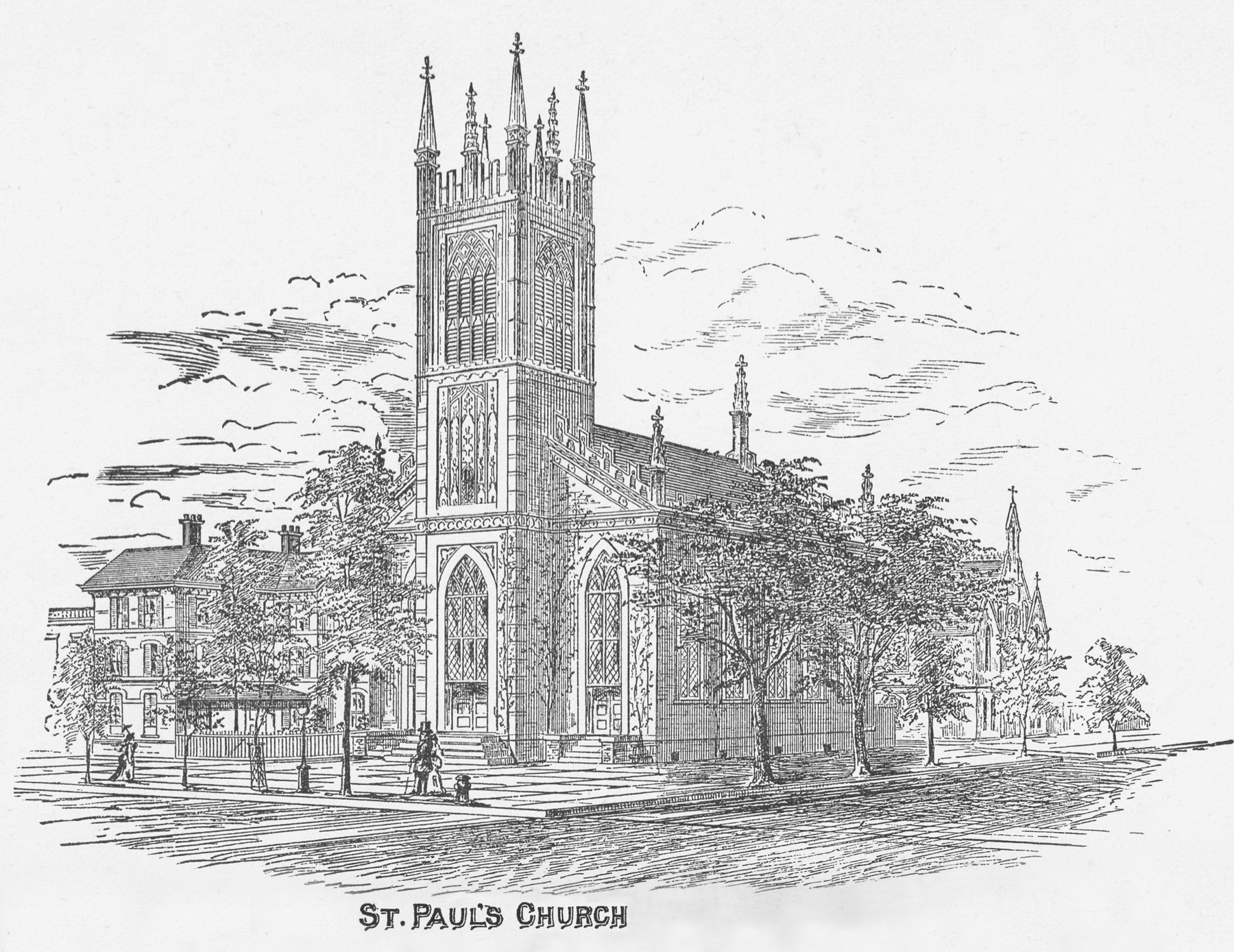
Engraving of the current church in 1876

The congregation was organized in 1795, not long after the city itself was first incorporated as a village. With financial support from New York City's Trinity Church, and the leadership of its first rector, the Rev. David Butler, it built its first church in 1804 at what is now the intersection of Third and Congress streets. That building was noted in 1818 as having the city's only organ. In 1826, its membership swelling due to the rapid growth of what was now a city, the congregation commissioned the new building.

The contract specified that the new church was to be a copy of Ithiel Town's Trinity Church in New Haven, Connecticut, finished in 1817, except where otherwise noted. The only significant difference between the two was their facing: Trinity used brown granite whereas St. Paul's used blue-gray limestone quarried in nearby Amsterdam. Ground was broken in 1826; the church was in use two years later.

In the years after the Civil War the church began renovations, starting with the Parish House, now the Guild House, in 1869. The battlements and pinnacles on the cornices were removed, and the bell tower modified, when a new bell was installed in the 1870s. In 1881, the construction of Martha House (to which a second story was added six years later), originally a residence for the nuns associated with the church, cost it the easternmost window on the northern profile. Otherwise, the exterior is as it originally was.

On the inside, a brass pulpit and new marble were added later in the 1880s. These led to the major renovations to the interior early in the 1890s, after money was raised to fix structural problems from the original construction. Hidden steel pillars shored up the church, and the ceiling was opened up, its trusses now visible. The rector at the time had recently returned from a tour of Europe's great Gothic churches, and so Louis Comfort Tiffany's company was hired to redecorate the interior afterwards, adding much of the glass and woodwork done by local craftsmen to Tiffany's designs. The stained glass windows were added shortly afterwards.

The 20th century saw a few more changes. A third story was added to Guild House in 1914. The church itself got its current organ in 1921, the Wayside Chapel in the 1940s, and the glass doors in the 1960s.
