= Potomac Beach, Virginia =

Unincorporated community in Virginia, US

Coordinates: 38°16′13″N 76°59′09″W

Potomac Beach is an unincorporated community in Westmoreland County, in the U. S. state of Virginia.
