= St. Paul's Episcopal Church Complex (Patchogue, New York) =

Historic church in New York, United States

- U.S. National Register of Historic Places
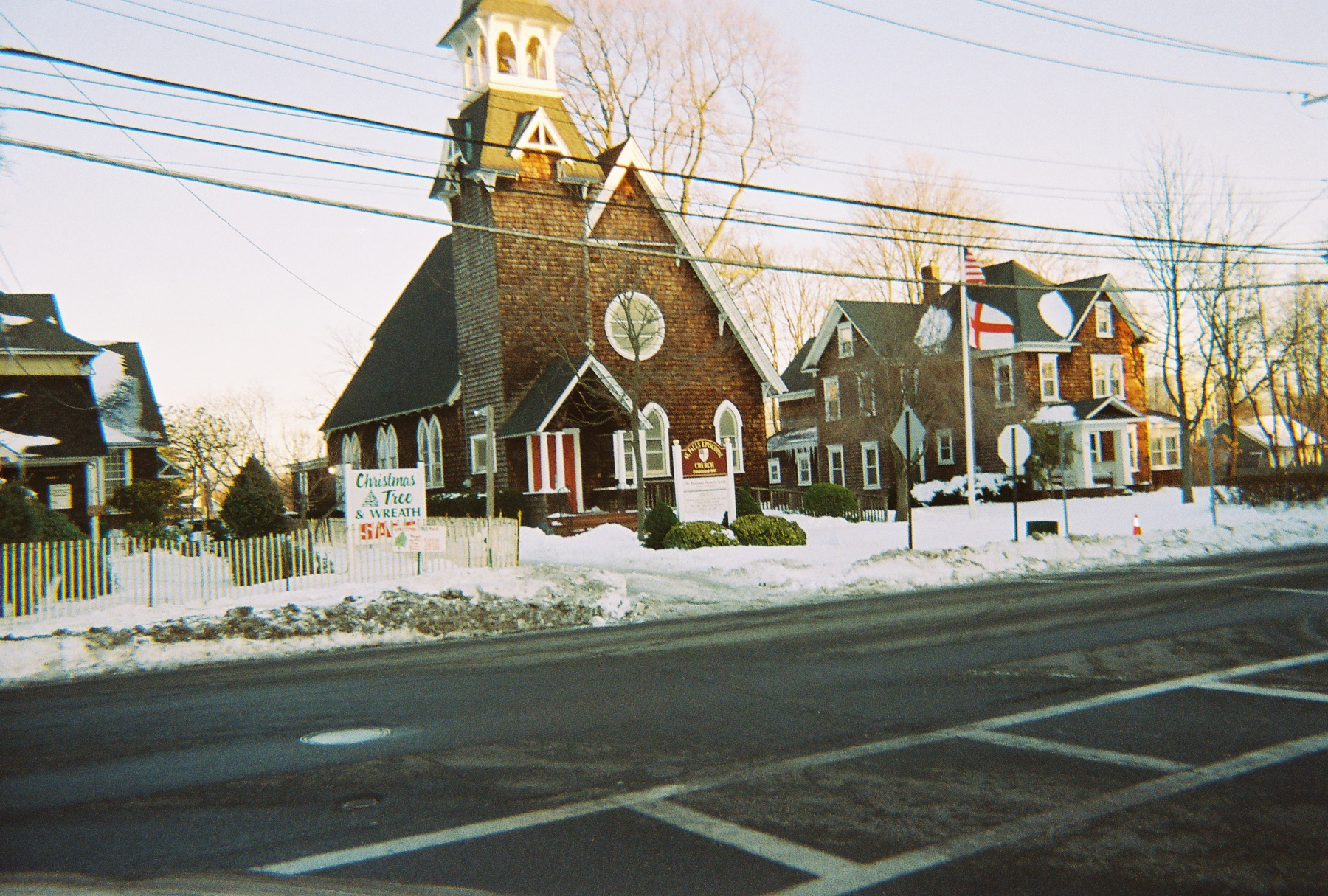
- St. Paul's Episcopal Church and two houses owned by the church.

- Location within New York Location within the United States
- Location: 31 Rider Avenue; Patchogue, New York
- Coordinates: 40°45′52″N 73°0′33″W
- Area: 1.5 acres (0.61 ha)
- Built: 1883
- Architectural style: Stick/Eastlake
- NRHP reference No.: 95000722
- Added to NRHP: June 22, 1995

St. Paul's Episcopal Church Complex is a historic church on Rider Avenue at the intersection of Terry Street in Patchogue, New York. Though the official address is listed as being at 31 Rider Avenue, the actual church is located between two houses owned by the church, the southernmost of which is actually located at 31 Rider Avenue.

It was built in 1883 and added to the National Register of Historic Places in 1995.
