= Potomac Mills, Westmoreland County, Virginia =

Unincorporated community in Virginia, US

Coordinates: 38°09′46″N 76°56′32″W

Potomac Mills is an unincorporated community in Westmoreland County, in the U. S. state of Virginia. The post office was established in 1877.
