= Osso, Virginia =

Unincorporated community in Virginia, United States

- Unincorporated community
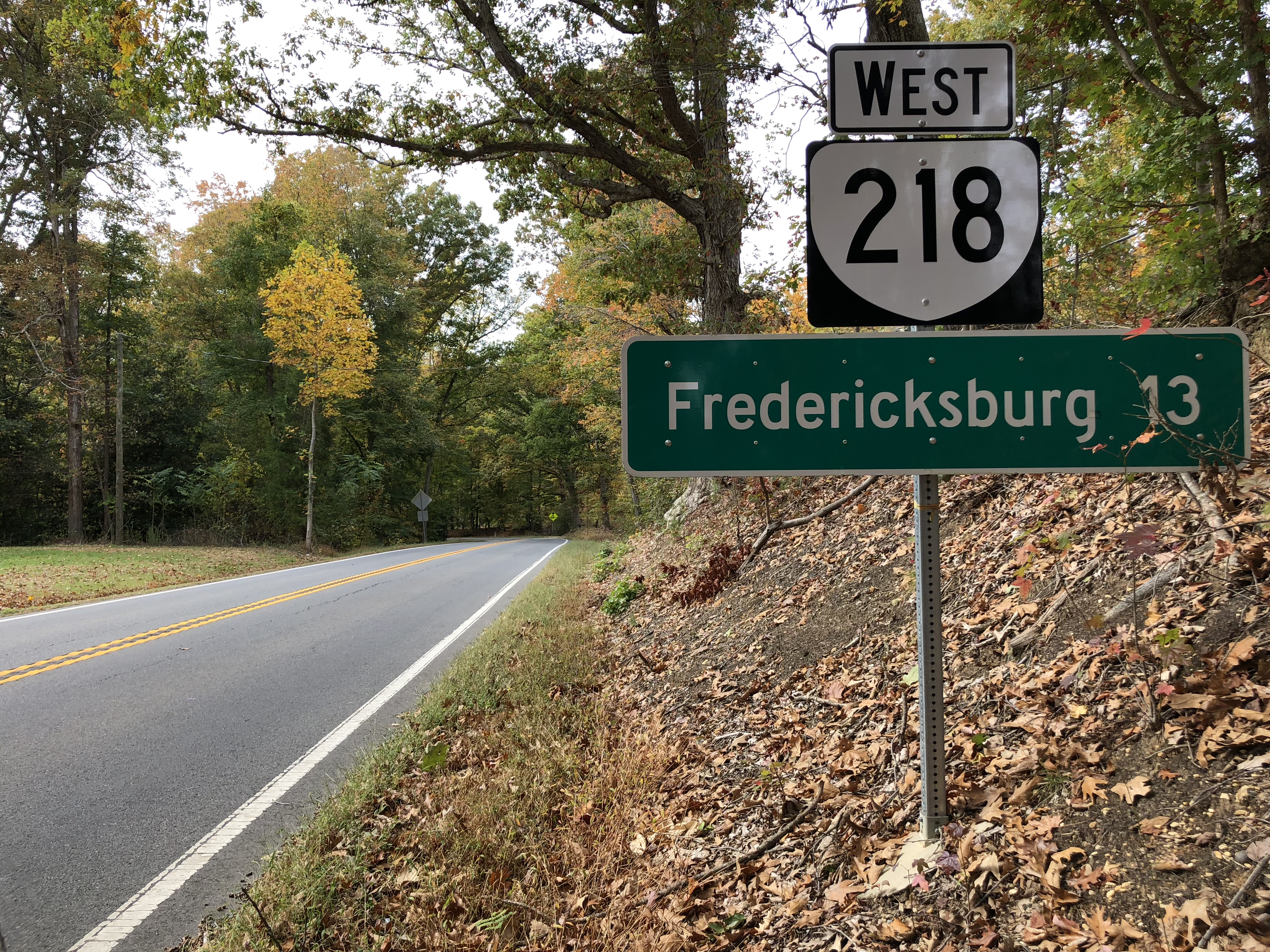

- Location within Virginia and the United States Osso (the United States)
- Coordinates: 38°18′35″N 77°13′50″W
- Country: United States
- State: Virginia
- County: King George
- Time zone: UTC−5 (Eastern (EST))
  - Summer (DST): UTC−4 (EDT)

Osso is an unincorporated community in King George County, Virginia, United States. It is listed as being “an Indian word, probably meaning "white waters.”"
