= Dahlgren, Virginia =

Unincorporated community in Virginia, US

- Census-designated place
- Location in King George County and the state of Virginia
- Coordinates: 38°20′10″N 77°3′3″W
- Country: United States
- State: Virginia
- County: King George

Area
  - Total: 2.80 sq mi (7.24 km^{2})
  - Land: 2.69 sq mi (6.98 km^{2})
  - Water: 0.097 sq mi (0.25 km^{2})
- Elevation: 20 ft (6.1 m)

Population (2010)
  - Total: 2,653
  - Density: 980/sq mi (380/km^{2})
- Time zone: UTC−5 (Eastern (EST))
  - Summer (DST): UTC−4 (EDT)
- ZIP codes: 22448, 22485
- Area code: 540
- FIPS code: 51-21008
- GNIS feature ID: 1465571

Dahlgren is an unincorporated community and census-designated place (CDP) in King George County, Virginia, United States. The population was 2,946 at the time of the 2020 census, up from 2,653 at the 2010 census, that representing an increase from 997 in 2000.

== History ==
Since 1918, Dahlgren has been the site of a U.S. naval base named for Rear Admiral John A. Dahlgren. It was first the "U.S. Naval Proving Ground" but was renamed the "U.S. Naval Weapons Laboratory" after 1950, the "Naval Surface Weapons Center" in 1974, the "Naval Surface Warfare Center" in 1987, and the "U.S. Naval Surface Warfare Center Dahlgren Division (NSWCDD)" around 1990. In 2006, it was renamed "Naval Support Activity-South Potomac (NSA-SP)", with NSWCDD becoming a tenant command of the base. The U.S. Naval Space Surveillance Systems command was located at that base, but that responsibility was transferred to the Air Force in 2004. The AEGIS Training and Readiness Center is currently a tenant command at NSA-SP. The naval base lies just east of the Dahlgren CDP within its own census-designated place, Dahlgren Center.

== Geography ==
Dahlgren is in northeastern King George County, 1 mile (1.6 km) south of and 2 miles (3 km) west of the Potomac River. It is bordered to the east by the Naval Surface Warfare Center Dahlgren Division. The Dahlgren CDP extends north to state route 635, to the west to the unincorporated community of Owens, and south to the tidal Upper Machodoc Creek, an arm of the Potomac.

U.S. Route 301 (the James Madison Parkway), runs through Dahlgren, leading northeast across the Potomac 18 miles (29 km) to La Plata, Maryland, and southwest 15 miles (24 km) to Port Royal.

According to the United States Census Bureau, the Dahlgren CDP has a total area of 2.8 square miles (7.2 km^{2}), of which 2.7 square miles (7.0 km^{2}) are land and 0.10 square miles (0.25 km^{2}), or 3.51%, are water.

== Demographics ==
Historical population
Census	Pop.	Note	%±
2000	997		—
2020	2,946		—
U.S. Decennial Census; 2000 2010 2020

Dahlgren was first listed as a census designated place in the 2000 U.S. census.

As of the census of 2000, there were 997 people, 456 households, and 260 families residing in the CDP. The population density was 885.2 people per square mile (340.7/km^{2}). There were 510 housing units at an average density of 452.8/sq mi (174.3/km^{2}). The racial makeup of the CDP was 70.31% White, 25.28% African American, 0.30% Native American, 1.50% Asian, 0.10% Pacific Islander, 0.60% from other races, and 1.91% from two or more races. Hispanic or Latino of any race were 1.71% of the population. As of the 2010 census the population had more than doubled, although the makeup was largely the same, with whites edging down as a percentage from 70.31% to 61.4%, blacks up from 25.28% to 30.5%, Hispanics up from 1.71% to 4.1%, and those reporting mixed race up from 1.91% to 3.8%.

There were 456 households, out of which 24.8% had children under the age of 18 living with them, 41.2% were married couples living together, 11.0% had a female householder with no husband present, and 42.8% were non-families. 36.8% of all households were made up of individuals, and 11.4% had someone living alone who was 65 years of age or older. The average household size was 2.19 and the average family size was 2.85.

In the CDP, the population was spread out, with 23.7% under the age of 18, 7.9% from 18 to 24, 30.6% from 25 to 44, 20.9% from 45 to 64, and 17.0% who were 65 years of age or older. The median age was 37 years. For every 100 females, there were 96.6 males. For every 100 females age 18 and over, there were 95.6 males.

The median income for a household in the CDP was $49,545, and the median income for a family was $53,500. Males had a median income of $45,714 versus $21,029 for females. The per capita income for the CDP was $25,928. About 7.6% of families and 8.5% of the population were below the poverty line, including 12.7% of those under age 18 and 10.5% of those age 65 or over.

== Attractions ==
The Dahlgren Heritage Museum is open to the public. It promotes the history, traditions, heritage, and culture of the U.S. Navy at Dahlgren, Virginia and the surrounding community. Its key holdings include a scale model of a Civil War-era Dahlgren gun, the propeller from the first radio-controlled, unmanned flight, and Norden bombsight. Machodoc Creek has a full service marina. The Raptor Challenge is a roadside attraction, where visitors try to locate the statues of Velociraptors along route 301.

== Infrastructure ==
The 1.7-mile-long (2.7 km) Governor Harry W. Nice Memorial Bridge on U.S. Route 301 funnels interstate traffic across the wide Potomac River at Dahlgren, offering an alternative to using Interstate 95. Dahlgren has a growing number of small businesses along 301.
