= Colonial Beach, Virginia =

- Town
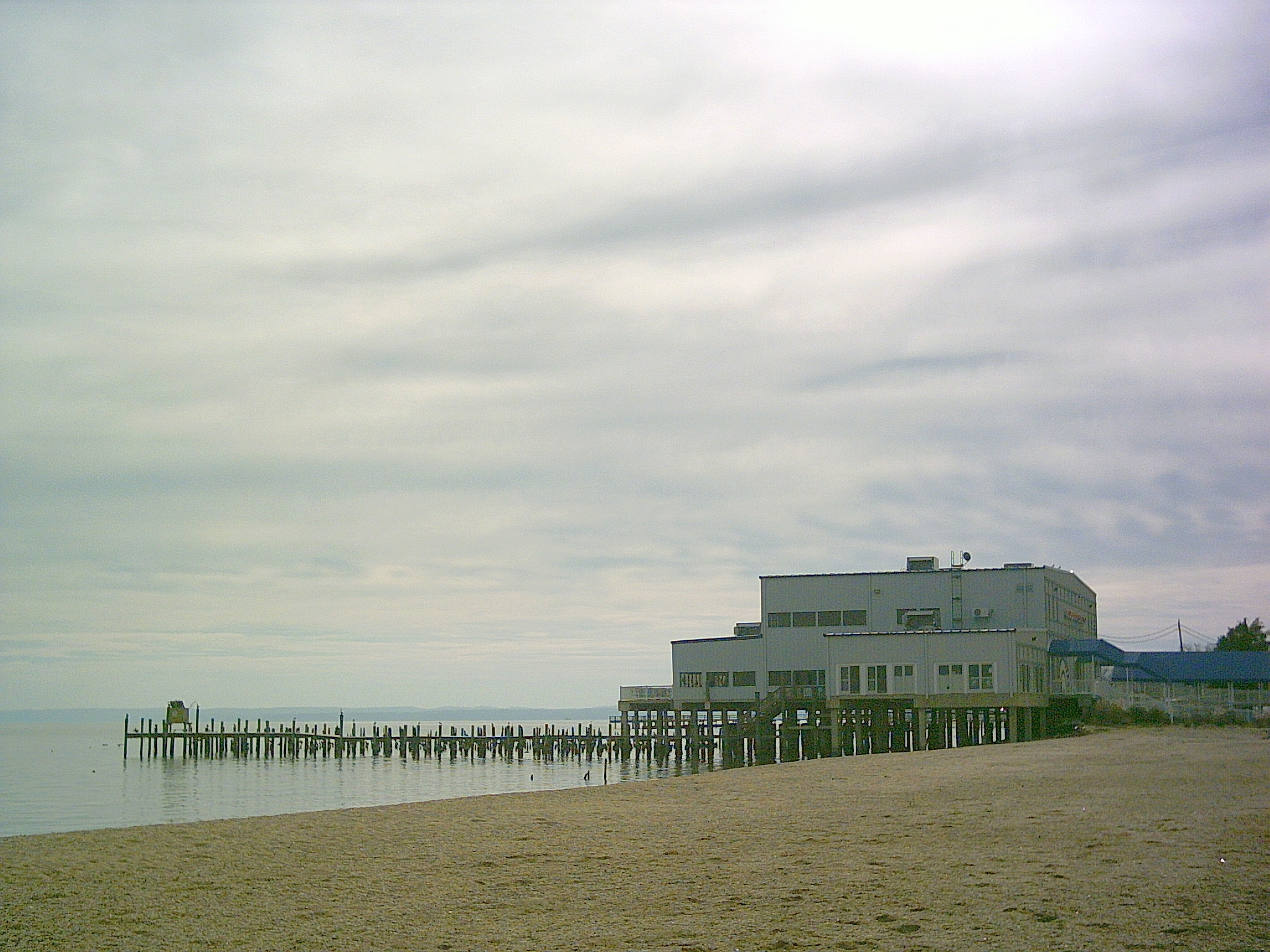
- Pier and Riverboat Off Track Betting, Restaurant, and Lounge.

- Seal
- Nicknames: Golf Cart Town, Playground on the Potomac
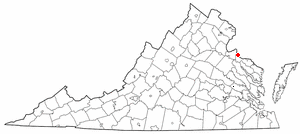
- Location in the Commonwealth of Virginia
- Coordinates: 38°15′N 76°58′W
- Country: United States
- State: Virginia
- County: Westmoreland
- Founded: 1892

Area
  - Total: 2.78 sq mi (7.21 km^{2})
  - Land: 2.45 sq mi (6.34 km^{2})
  - Water: 0.33 sq mi (0.86 km^{2})
- Elevation: 10 ft (3.0 m)

Population (2020)
  - Total: 3,908
  - Estimate (2024): 4,038
  - Density: 1,596/sq mi (616.3/km^{2})
- Time zone: UTC−5 (EST)
  - Summer (DST): UTC−4 (EDT)
- ZIP code: 22443
- Area code: 804
- FIPS code: 51-18400
- GNIS feature ID: 1493549
- Website: https://www.colonialbeachva.gov/

Colonial Beach, Virginia (CBVA) is a river and beach town located in the northwestern part of Westmoreland County on Virginia's Northern Neck peninsula. It is bounded by the Potomac River, Monroe Bay and Monroe Creek. It is located 65 mi (105 km) from Washington, D.C.; 70 mi (110 km) from the state capital of Richmond; and 35 nautical miles from the Chesapeake Bay.

As of the 2020 census, Colonial Beach had a population of 3,908.

Colonial Beach was named Best Virginia Beach for 2018 by USA Today. In 2019, Colonial Beach was named The Nicest Place in Virginia and a finalist for Nicest Places in America by Reader's Digest.

Colonial Beach was a popular resort town in the early to mid-20th century, before the Chesapeake Bay Bridge made ocean beaches on the Eastern Shore of Maryland more accessible to visitors from Washington, D.C. The family of Alexander Graham Bell maintained a summer home in Colonial Beach, the Bell House, which still stands today. Sloan Wilson, author of The Man in the Gray Flannel Suit, retired and died in Colonial Beach. George Washington, the first President of the United States, was born nearby at what is now the George Washington Birthplace National Monument. In addition, the nearby James Monroe Family Home Site, birthplace of President James Monroe, has a replica of his birthplace.

== History ==
Judging by excavations done on oyster pits, it would seem that Native Americans have inhabited the area of modern-day Colonial Beach since at least the Early Woodland Period (500 B.C.- A.D. 900).

The town area now known as ‘The Point’ was originally patented by John Lancelott and S. Lancelott [Odyer and Sturman Escheat] on October 29, 1651.

Colonial Beach emerged as a bathing and fishing resort in the late 19th century known as the "Playground on the Potomac." Prior to automobile travel, most visitors arrived by boat from Washington, D.C.

The town was incorporated on February 25, 1892, and there was extensive construction of houses, summer cottages, and hotels. Arguably the most famous of these structures is the Bell House, built for Alexander Graham Bell as a summer home, which still stands today on Irving Avenue.

The area was at the center of the Potomac River Oyster Wars between Virginia watermen and the Maryland State Oyster Police that lasted from the late 19th century to the 1960s.

The town began to gradually decline as the automobile made travel to more distant ocean beaches more feasible. However, because gambling was legal in Maryland and the Maryland state line ends at the low-water mark of Virginia's Potomac River shore, from 1949 to 1958, Colonial Beach offered slot machines in pier casinos extending into Maryland waters. This temporarily revitalized the town, although it was sometimes called "the poor man's Las Vegas." However, the piers burned in the 1960s in a devastating fire and the town continued to decline.

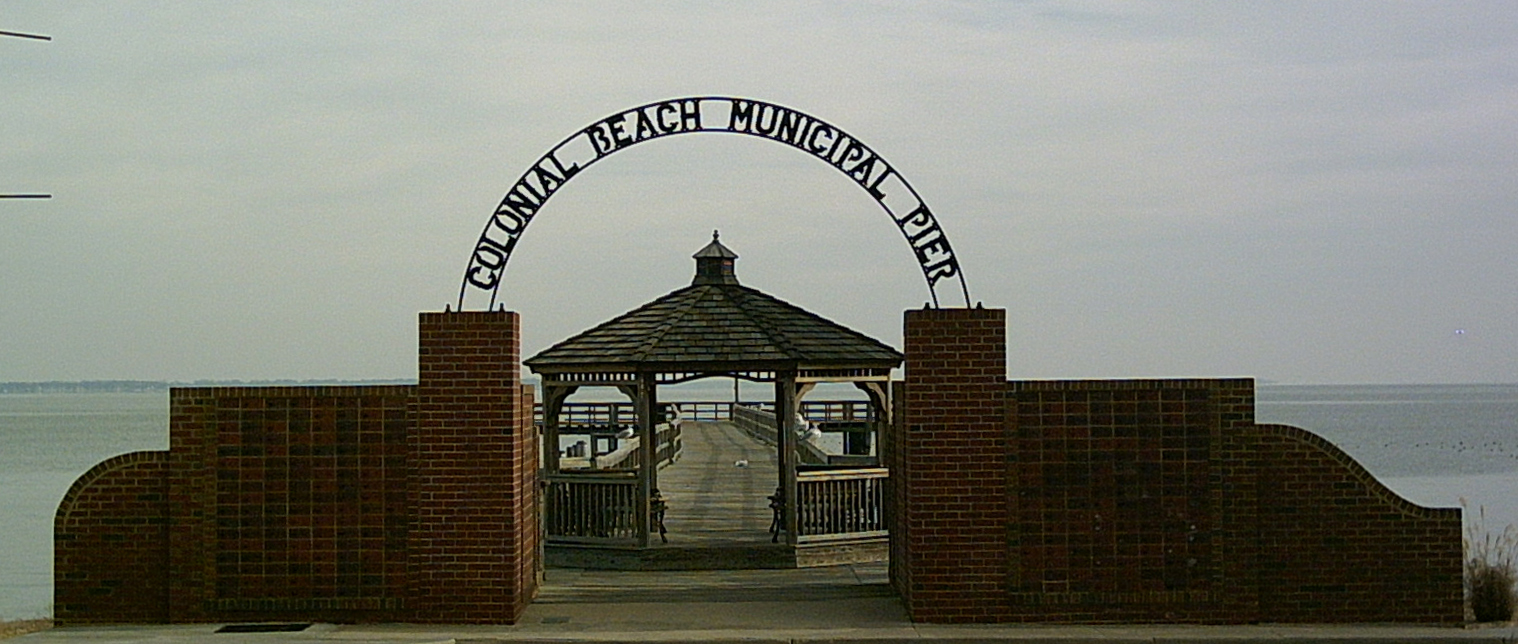
Entrance to the Colonial Beach Municipal Pier

The town is ranked fifth-safest place to live in Virginia by Safewise.

== Geography ==
Colonial Beach is located at 38°15′14″N 76°58′8″W (38.253840, −76.968941), in the northwestern part of Westmoreland County in Virginia's Northern Neck, 65 mi (105 km) from Washington, D.C., and 70 mi (110 km) from the state capital Richmond.

The Potomac River forms the northeastern boundary of Colonial Beach. The southern part of the town forms a peninsula which ends just above Monroe Bay and divides Monroe Creek from the Potomac River. A short distance north of Colonial Beach is the community of Potomac Beach and the mouth of Rosier Creek. Inland from Colonial Beach lie the settlements of Monroe Hall, near the birthplace of President James Monroe, and Maple Grove.

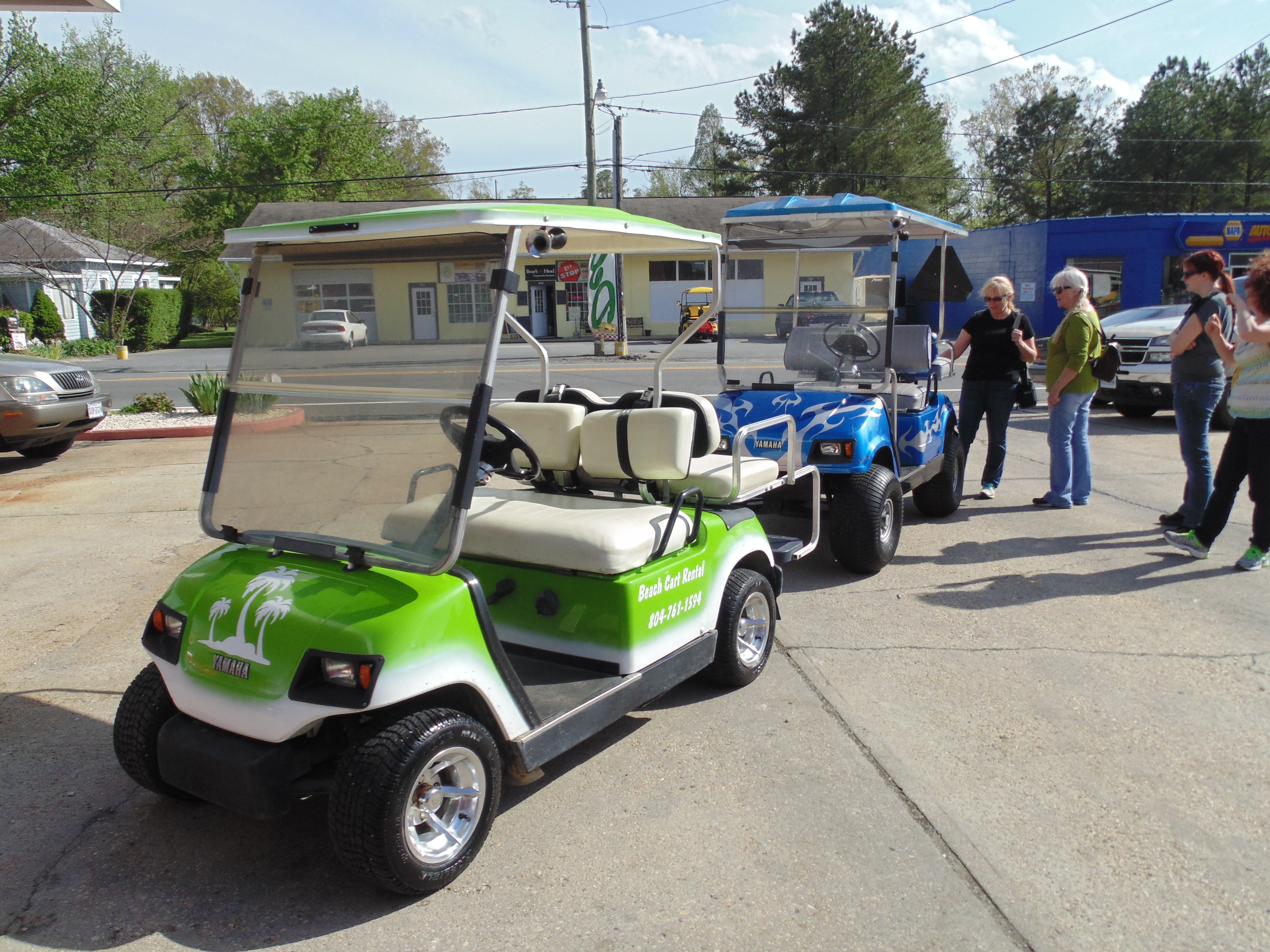
Golf carts in downtown Colonial Beach

According to the United States Census Bureau, the town has a total area of 2.8 square miles (7.2 km^{2}), of which 2.4 square miles (6.3 km^{2}) is land and 0.35 square miles (0.9 km^{2}) (12.00%) is water. The town's 2.5 miles (4.0 km) of beaches are second in length only to those of Virginia Beach in the Commonwealth of Virginia.

=== Climate ===
The climate in this area is characterized by hot, humid summers and generally mild to cool winters. According to the Köppen Climate Classification system, Colonial Beach has a humid subtropical climate, abbreviated "Cfa" on climate maps.

== Demographics ==
Historical population
Census	Pop.	Note	%±
1900	453		—
1910	721		59.2%
1920	1,093		51.6%
1930	928		−15.1%
1940	1,105		19.1%
1950	1,464		32.5%
1960	1,769		20.8%
1970	2,058		16.3%
1980	2,474		20.2%
1990	3,132		26.6%
2000	3,228		3.1%
2010	3,542		9.7%
2020	3,908		10.3%
2024 (est.)	4,038	▲	3.3%
U.S. Decennial Census

=== 2020 census ===
As of the 2020 census, Colonial Beach had a population of 3,908. The median age was 49.2 years. 18.4% of residents were under the age of 18 and 26.6% of residents were 65 years of age or older. For every 100 females there were 86.2 males, and for every 100 females age 18 and over there were 84.8 males age 18 and over.

99.5% of residents lived in urban areas, while 0.5% lived in rural areas.

There were 1,792 households in Colonial Beach, of which 23.0% had children under the age of 18 living in them. Of all households, 36.7% were married-couple households, 21.1% were households with a male householder and no spouse or partner present, and 36.2% were households with a female householder and no spouse or partner present. About 37.2% of all households were made up of individuals and 19.4% had someone living alone who was 65 years of age or older.

There were 2,499 housing units, of which 28.3% were vacant. The homeowner vacancy rate was 2.8% and the rental vacancy rate was 7.7%.

Racial composition as of the 2020 census
Race	Number	Percent
White	2,890	74.0%
Black or African American	549	14.0%
American Indian and Alaska Native	21	0.5%
Asian	72	1.8%
Native Hawaiian and Other Pacific Islander	11	0.3%
Some other race	56	1.4%
Two or more races	309	7.9%
Hispanic or Latino (of any race)	129	3.3%

=== 2010 census ===
The population was 3,542 at the 2010 census.

=== 2000 census ===
As of the census of 2000, there were 3,228 people, 1,437 households, and 863 families residing in the town. The population density was 1,246.7/sq mi (481.4/km^{2}). There were 2,030 housing units at an average density of 784.0/sq mi (302.7/km^{2}). The racial makeup of the town was 79.21% White, 16.95% African American, 0.09% Native American, 0.62% Asian, 1.64% from other races, and 1.49% from two or more races. Hispanic or Latino of any race were 3.38% of the population.

There were 1,437 households, out of which 24.1% had children under the age of 18 living with them, 40.9% were married couples living together, 15.3% had a female householder with no husband present, and 39.9% were non-families. 34.9% of all households were made up of individuals, and 18.2% had someone living alone who was 65 years of age or older. The average household size was 2.20 and the average family size was 2.77.

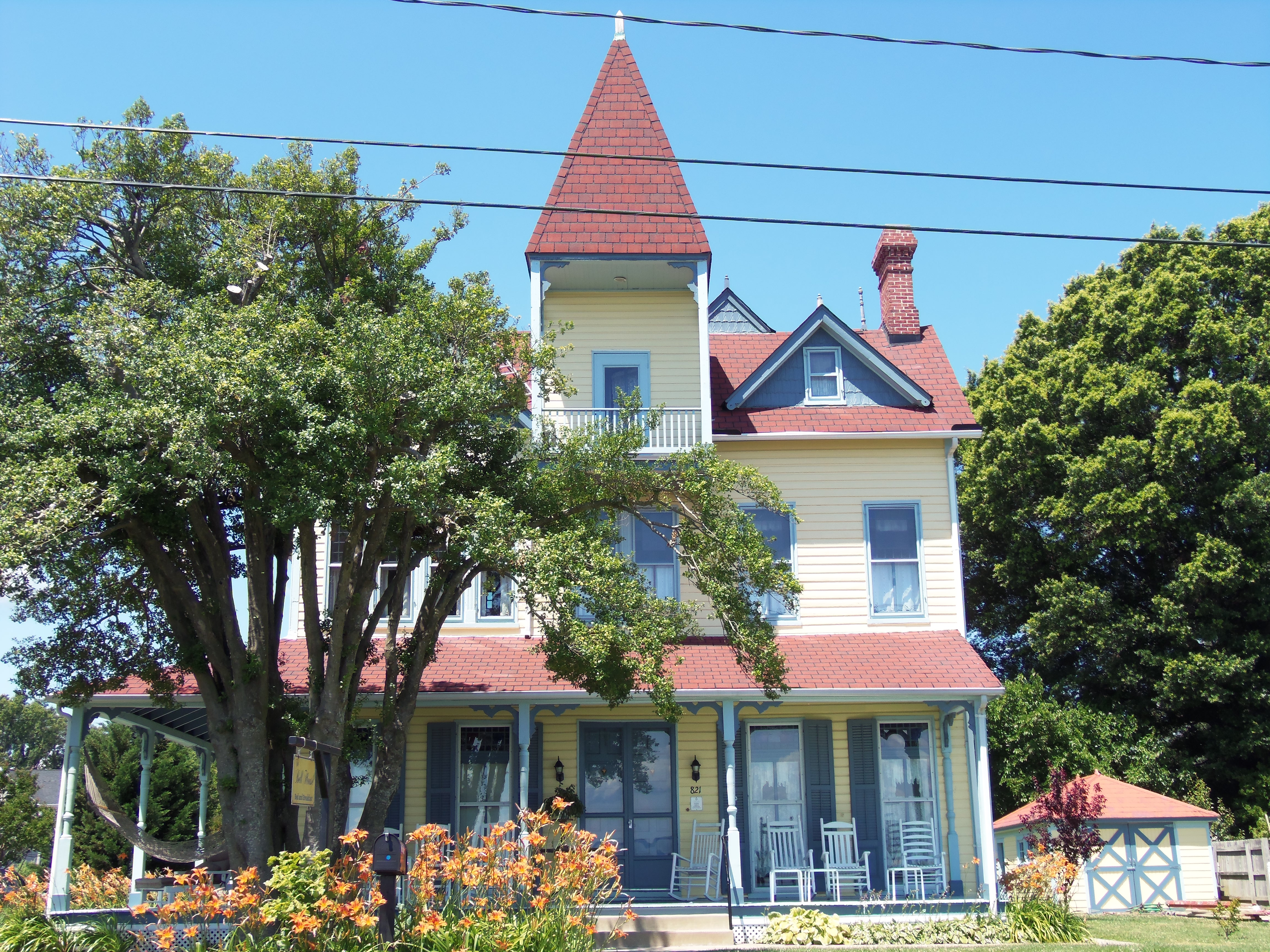
Alexander Graham Bell's summer home in Colonial Beach, Virginia

In the town, the population was spread out, with 22.0% under the age of 18, 6.3% from 18 to 24, 23.2% from 25 to 44, 26.0% from 45 to 64, and 22.5% who were 65 years of age or older. The median age was 44 years. For every 100 females, there were 82.7 males. For every 100 females age 18 and over, there were 77.6 males.

=== Income and poverty ===
The median income for a household in the town was $31,711, and the median income for a family was $38,080. Males had a median income of $30,000 versus $19,535 for females. The per capita income for the town was $19,991.20 About 23.0% of families and 25.4% of the population were below the poverty line, including 45.7% of those under age 18 and 16.6% of those age 65 or over.

== Infrastructure ==
=== Transportation ===
Colonial Beach is served by Virginia State Route 205, a spur of which bisects the town as State Route 205Y (Colonial Avenue). The town is accessible by boat and is the last deepwater port for pleasure boats going north on the Potomac River.

== Education ==
All residential areas of the town is served by Colonial Beach Public Schools, a school division established in 1907. The school division operates two schools with a combined student population of about 580 as of 2024.

There are some commercial areas within the Westmoreland County Public Schools.

== Notable people ==
- Ed Mirvish – Canadian businessman and philanthropist.
- Sloan Wilson – author of The Man in the Gray Flannel Suit.
- Torrey Smith – Two-time Super Bowl winning NFL player.
- Sherryl Woods – Author of the Chesapeake Shore Series of novels and Producer of Chesapeake Shores Television show
- Krystal Ball – Political pundit and journalist for The Hill
