= James Monroe =

Founding Father, U.S. president from 1817 to 1825

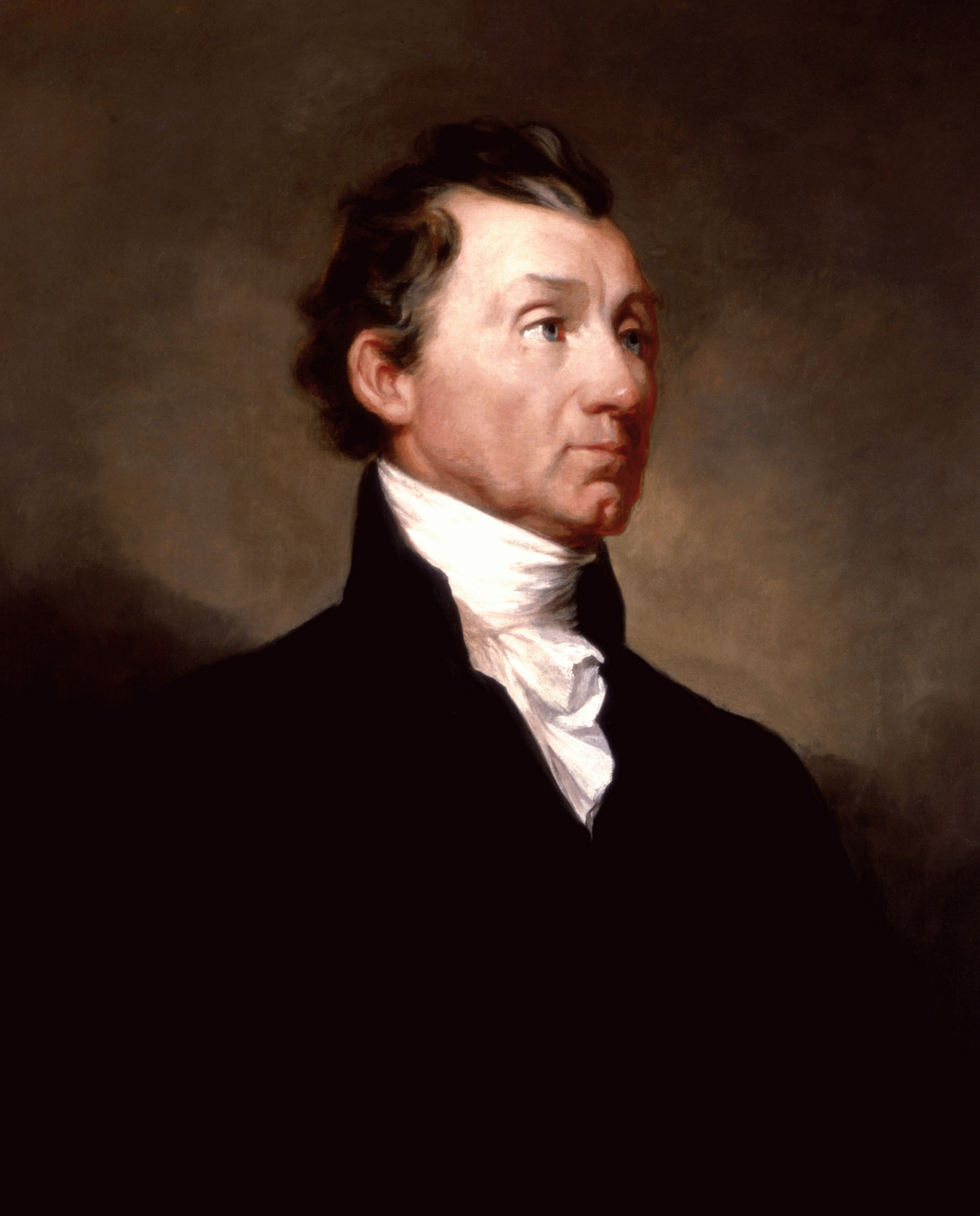
- Portrait, c. 1819

5th President of the United States
- In office March 4, 1817 – March 4, 1825
- Vice President: Daniel D. Tompkins
- Preceded by: James Madison
- Succeeded by: John Quincy Adams

7th United States Secretary of State
- In office April 6, 1811 – March 4, 1817
- President: James Madison
- Preceded by: Robert Smith
- Succeeded by: John Quincy Adams

8th United States Secretary of War
- In office September 27, 1814 – March 2, 1815
- President: James Madison
- Preceded by: John Armstrong Jr.
- Succeeded by: William H. Crawford

12th and 16th Governor of Virginia
- In office January 16, 1811 – April 2, 1811
- Preceded by: John Tyler Sr.
- Succeeded by: George William Smith
- In office December 28, 1799 – December 1, 1802
- Preceded by: James Wood
- Succeeded by: John Page

4th United States Minister to the United Kingdom
- In office August 17, 1803 – October 7, 1807
- President: Thomas Jefferson
- Preceded by: Rufus King
- Succeeded by: William Pinkney

5th United States Minister to France
- In office August 15, 1794 – December 9, 1796
- President: George Washington
- Preceded by: Gouverneur Morris
- Succeeded by: Charles Cotesworth Pinckney

United States Senator from Virginia
- In office November 9, 1790 – May 27, 1794
- Preceded by: John Walker
- Succeeded by: Stevens Thomson Mason

Member of the Virginia House of Delegates
- In office 1782
- In office 1786–1787
- In office 1810–1811

Delegate from Virginia to the Congress of the Confederation
- In office November 3, 1783 – November 7, 1786
- Preceded by: Constituency established
- Succeeded by: Henry Lee III

Personal details
- Born: April 28, 1758 Monroe Hall, Virginia, British America
- Died: July 4, 1831 (aged 73) New York City, U.S.
- Resting place: Hollywood Cemetery (Richmond, Virginia)
- Party: Democratic-Republican
- Spouse: Elizabeth Kortright (m. 1786; died 1830)
- Children: 3, including Eliza and Maria
- Relatives: Joseph Jones (uncle); James Monroe (nephew)
- Education: College of William & Mary
- Occupation: Politician; lawyer

Military service
- Branch/service: Continental Army; Virginia militia
- Years of service: 1775–1777 (Army); 1777–1780 (Militia)
- Rank: Lieutenant (Army); Major (Army); Colonel (Militia)
- Unit: 3rd Virginia Regiment
- Battles/wars: American Revolutionary War; New York and New Jersey campaign; Battle of Trenton (WIA); Philadelphia campaign; Valley Forge; Battle of Monmouth

James Monroe (Note: /mənˈroʊ/ mən-ROH) (April 28, 1758 – July 4, 1831) was a Founding Father and the fifth president of the United States, serving from 1817 to 1825. He was the last Founding Father to serve as president. A member of the Democratic-Republican Party, his presidency coincided with the Era of Good Feelings, in which the First Party System of American politics ended with the collapse of the Federalist Party. He also issued the Monroe Doctrine, which deemed any form of foreign interference in the Western Hemisphere as a hostile act against the United States, and his doctrine continues to be denounced, reinstated, and reinterpreted into the 21st century.

During the American Revolutionary War, he served in the Continental Army. From 1780 to 1783, Monroe studied law under Thomas Jefferson and subsequently served as a delegate to both the Continental Congress and the Virginia Ratifying Convention. He opposed the ratification of the United States Constitution. In 1790, Monroe won election to the Senate where he became a leader of the Democratic-Republican Party. He left the Senate in 1794 to serve as President George Washington's ambassador to France but was recalled by Washington in 1796. Monroe won the election as Governor of Virginia in 1799 and strongly supported Jefferson's candidacy in the 1800 presidential election.

As President Jefferson's special envoy, Monroe helped negotiate the Louisiana Purchase, through which the United States nearly doubled in size. Monroe fell out with his longtime friend James Madison after Madison rejected the Monroe–Pinkney Treaty that Monroe negotiated with Britain. He unsuccessfully challenged Madison for the Democratic-Republican nomination in the 1808 presidential election, and he joined Madison's administration as Secretary of State in 1811. During the later stages of the War of 1812, Monroe simultaneously served as Madison's Secretary of State and Secretary of War. Monroe's wartime leadership established him as Madison's heir apparent, and he easily defeated Federalist candidate Rufus King in the 1816 presidential election.

During Monroe's tenure as president, the Federalist Party collapsed as a national political force and Monroe was re-elected, virtually unopposed, in 1820. As president, he signed the Missouri Compromise, which admitted Missouri as a slave state and banned slavery from territories north of the 36°30′ parallel. In foreign affairs, Monroe and Secretary of State John Quincy Adams favored a policy of conciliation with Britain and a policy of expansionism against the Spanish Empire. In the 1819 Adams–Onís Treaty with Spain, the United States secured Florida and established its western border with New Spain. In 1823, Monroe announced the United States' opposition to any European intervention in the recently independent countries of the Americas with the Monroe Doctrine, which became a landmark in American foreign policy. Monroe was a member of the American Colonization Society which supported the colonization of Africa by freed slaves, and Liberia's capital of Monrovia is named in his honor. Following his retirement in 1825, he was plagued by financial difficulties and died on July 4, 1831, in New York City. Historians have generally ranked him as an above-average president.

== Early life and education ==
James Monroe was born on April 28, 1758, in his parents' house in a wooded area of Westmoreland County in the Colony of Virginia, to Andrew Spence Monroe and Elizabeth Jones. The marked site is one mile (1.6 km) from the unincorporated community known today as Monroe Hall, Virginia. The James Monroe Family Home Site was listed on the National Register of Historic Places in 1979. He had one sister, Elizabeth and three younger brothers, Spence, Andrew and Joseph Jones. Monroe's father worked as a craftsman and was a patriot who was involved in protests against the Stamp Act. His mother was the daughter of a Welsh immigrant whose family was one of the wealthiest in King George County.

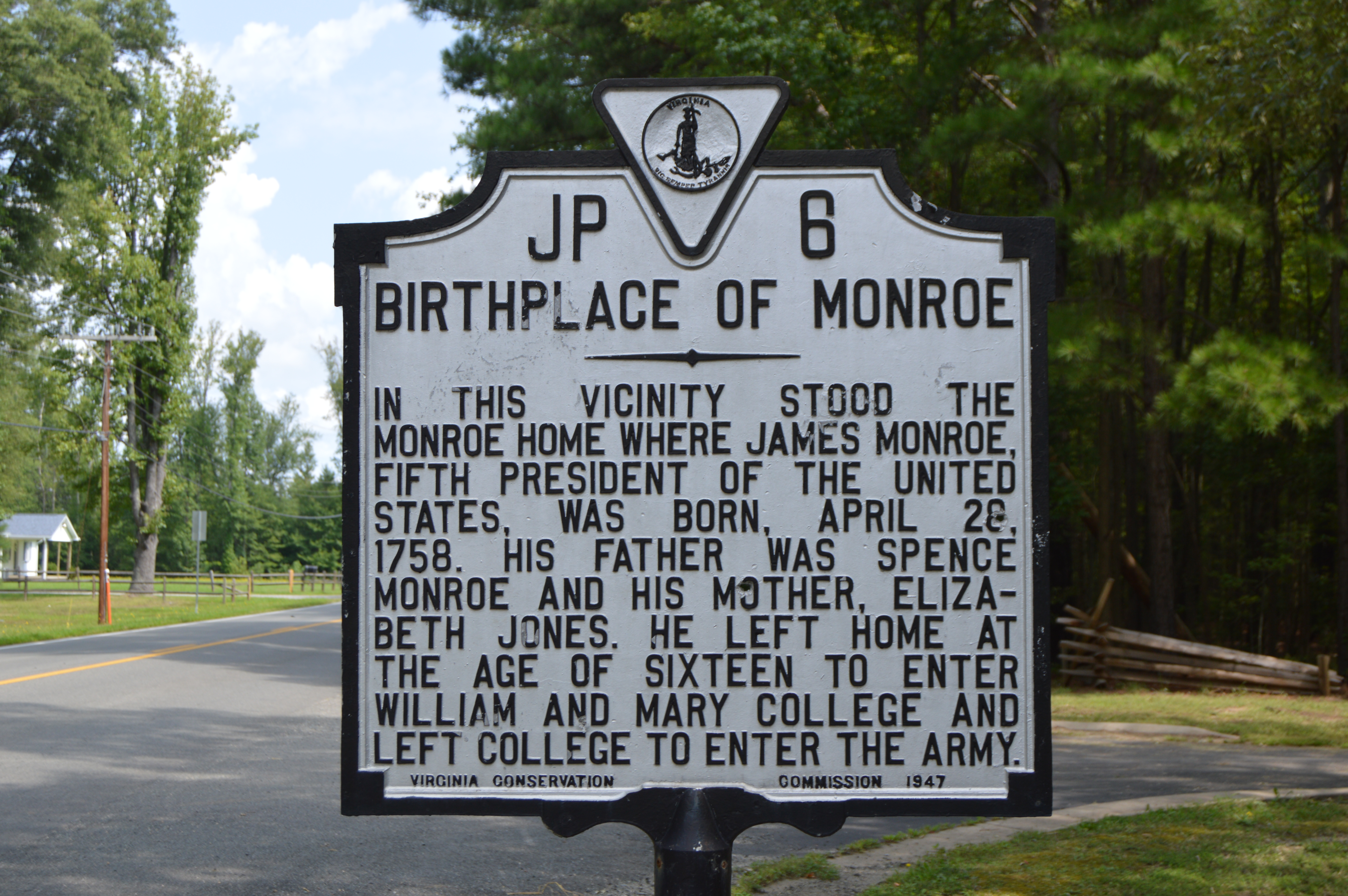
Marker designating the site of James Monroe's birthplace in Monroe Hall, Virginia

His paternal great-great-grandfather Patrick Andrew Monroe emigrated to America from Scotland in the mid-17th century as a Royalist after the defeat of Charles I in the English Civil War, and was part of an ancient Scottish clan known as Clan Munro. In 1650, he patented a large tract of land in Washington Parish, Westmoreland County, Virginia. Also among James Monroe's ancestors were French Huguenot immigrants, who came to Virginia in 1700.

At age 11, Monroe was enrolled in Campbelltown Academy, the only school in the county. This school was considered the best in the colony of Virginia, which is why Monroe was later able to immediately take advanced courses in Latin and mathematics at the College of William & Mary. He attended this school only 11 weeks a year, as his labor was needed on the farm. During this time, Monroe formed a lifelong friendship with an older classmate, future Chief Justice of the Supreme Court John Marshall.

In 1772, Monroe's mother died after giving birth to her youngest child and his father died soon after, leaving him as the eldest son in charge of the family. Though he inherited property, including slaves, from both of his parents, the 16-year-old Monroe was forced to withdraw from school to support his younger brothers. His childless maternal uncle, Joseph Jones, became a surrogate father to Monroe and his siblings and paid off his brother-in-law's debts. A member of the Virginia House of Burgesses, Jones took Monroe to the capital of Williamsburg, Virginia, and enrolled him in the College of William and Mary in June 1774. Jones also introduced Monroe to important Virginians such as Thomas Jefferson, Patrick Henry, and George Washington.

During this phase of the American Revolution, opposition to the British government grew in the Thirteen Colonies in reaction to the "Intolerable Acts", a series of harsh laws against the Colonies in response to the Boston Tea Party. In Williamsburg, British Governor John Murray, 4th Earl of Dunmore, dissolved the Assembly after protests by the delegates, who then decided to send a delegation to the First Continental Congress in Philadelphia. Dunmore wanted to take advantage of the absence of the Burgesses, who had convened to Richmond, and had soldiers of the Royal Navy confiscate the weapons of the Virginian militia, which alarmed militiamen and students of the College of William & Mary, including Monroe.

They marched to the Governor's Palace and demanded that Dunmore return the confiscated gunpowder. When more militiamen arrived in Williamsburg under the leadership of Patrick Henry, Dunmore agreed to pay compensation for the confiscated goods. Monroe and his fellow students were so incensed by the governor's actions that they conducted daily military drills on campus afterward. On June 24, 1775, Monroe and 24 militiamen stormed the Governor's Palace, capturing several hundred muskets and swords.

== Revolutionary War service ==
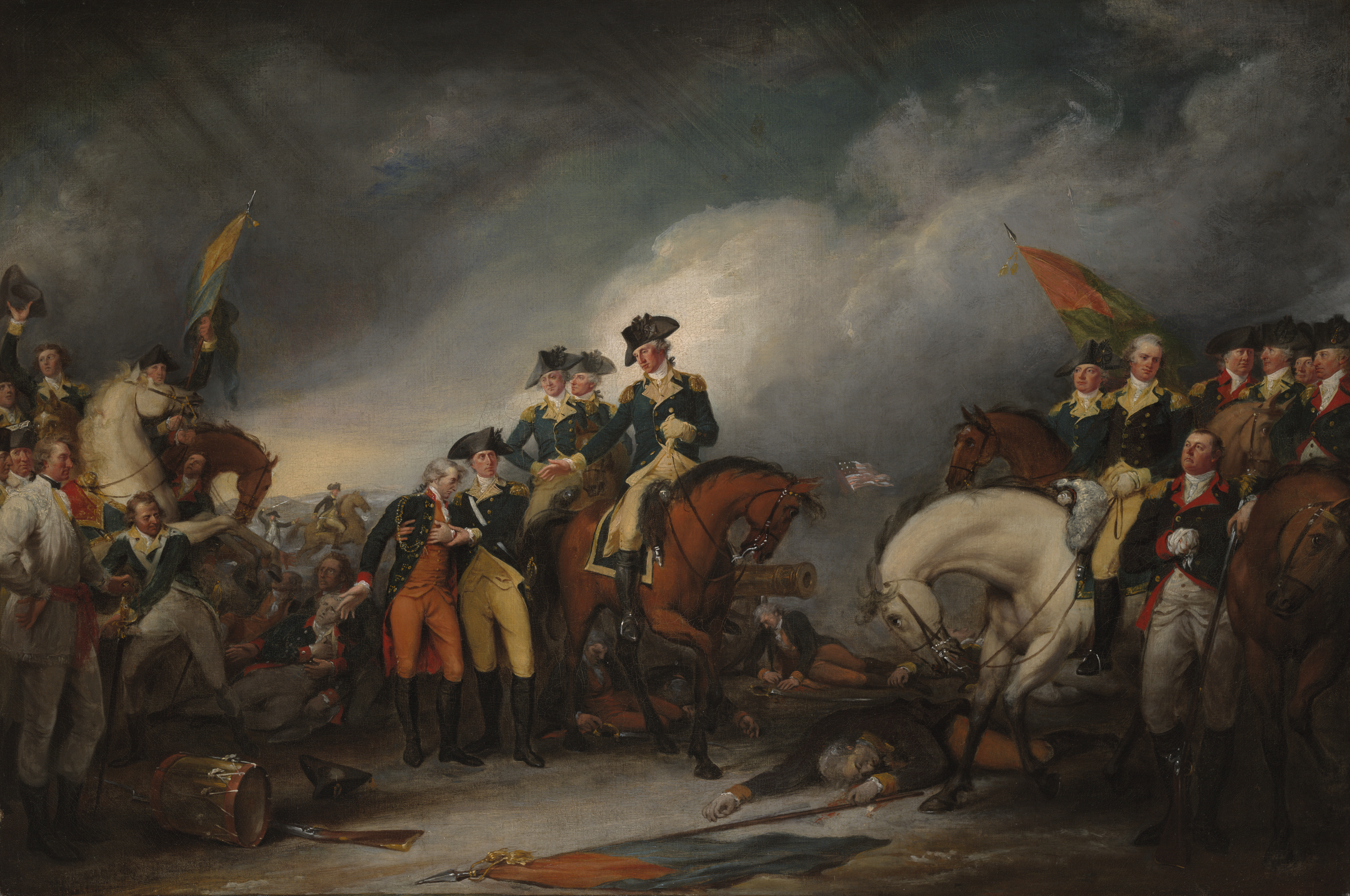
The Capture of the Hessians at Trenton, December 26, 1776, by John Trumbull. A severely wounded Monroe, left of center, is depicted as being held by Dr. John Riker.

In early 1776, about a year and a half after his enrollment, Monroe dropped out of college and joined the 3rd Virginia Regiment in the Continental Army, despite mourning the death of his brother Spence, who had died shortly before. As the fledgling army valued literacy in its officers, Monroe was commissioned with the rank of lieutenant, serving under Colonel George Weedon and later Captain William Washington. After months of training, Monroe and 700 Virginia infantrymen were called north to serve in the New York and New Jersey campaign. Monroe's regiment played a central role in the Continental Army's retreat across the Delaware River on December 7 in response to the loss of Fort Washington. In late December, Monroe took part in a surprise attack on a Hessian encampment at the Battle of Trenton. Though the attack was successful, Monroe suffered a severed artery in the battle and nearly died. In the aftermath, Washington cited Monroe and William Washington for their bravery, and promoted Monroe to captain.

After recovering for two months, Monroe returned to Virginia to recruit his own company of soldiers. Lacking the wealth to induce soldiers to join his company, Monroe instead asked his uncle to return him to the front. Monroe was assigned to the staff of General William Alexander, Lord Stirling as an auxiliary officer. At the Battle of Brandywine, he formed a close friendship with the Marquis de Lafayette, a French volunteer who encouraged him to view the war as part of a wider struggle against religious and political tyranny. Monroe served in the Philadelphia campaign and spent the winter of 1777–78 at the encampment of Valley Forge, sharing a log hut with Marshall. By late 1777, he was promoted to major and served as Lord Stirling's aide-de-camp. After serving in the Battle of Monmouth, the destitute Monroe resigned his commission in December 1778 and joined his uncle in Philadelphia. After the British captured Savannah, the Virginia legislature decided to raise four regiments, and Monroe returned to his native state, hoping to receive his own command. With letters of recommendation from Washington, Stirling, and Alexander Hamilton, Monroe received a commission as a lieutenant colonel and was expected to lead one of the regiments, but recruitment again proved to be a problem. On Jones's advice, Monroe returned to Williamsburg to study law at the College of William and Mary, becoming a protégé of Virginia Governor Thomas Jefferson. Jefferson, with whom Monroe soon formed a close and lifelong friendship, advised his protégé to pursue a political career and made his library available to him, where the works of Epictetus in particular had a great influence on Monroe

With the British increasingly focusing their operations in the Southern colonies, the Virginians moved the capital to the more defensible city of Richmond, and Monroe accompanied Jefferson to the new capital. Jefferson appointed Monroe as a military commissioner with the task of maintaining contact with the Southern Continental Army, under the command of General Johann von Kalb, and the Virginia Militia. At the end of 1780, British forces invaded Virginia and Monroe, who had become a colonel in the meantime, was given command of a regiment for the first time. However, he was still unable to raise an army due to a lack of interested recruits and returned to his home in King George County, being absent during the British raid on Richmond. As both the Continental Army and the Virginia militia had an abundance of officers, Monroe did not serve during the Yorktown campaign, and, much to his frustration, did not take part in the siege of Yorktown. Although Andrew Jackson served as a courier in a militia unit at age 13, Monroe is regarded as the last U.S. president who was a Revolutionary War veteran, since he served as an officer of the Continental Army and took part in combat. As a result of his service, Monroe became a member of the Society of the Cincinnati.

== Early political career ==
=== Member of Continental Congress ===
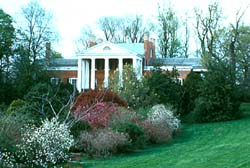
Oak Hill Mansion

Monroe resumed studying law under Jefferson and continued until 1783. He was not particularly interested in legal theory or practice, but chose to take it up because he thought it offered "the most immediate rewards" and could ease his path to wealth, social standing, and political influence. In 1782, Monroe was elected to the Virginia House of Delegates. After serving on Virginia's Executive Council, he was elected to the Fourth Congress of the Confederation in November 1783 and served in Annapolis until Congress convened in Trenton, New Jersey in June 1784. He had served a total of three years when he finally retired from that office by the rule of rotation. By that time, the government was meeting in the temporary capital of New York City. In 1784, Monroe undertook an extensive trip through Western New York and Pennsylvania to inspect the conditions in the Northwest. The tour convinced him that the United States had to pressure Britain to abandon its posts in the region and assert control of the Northwest. While serving in Congress, Monroe became an advocate for western expansion, and played a key role in the writing and passage of the Northwest Ordinance. The ordinance created the Northwest Territory, providing for federal administration of the territories west of Pennsylvania and north of the Ohio River. Another of Monroe's goals in the Confederate Congress was to negotiate American rights to free navigation on the Mississippi River. During this period, Jefferson continued to serve as a mentor to Monroe, and, at Jefferson's prompting, he befriended another prominent Virginian, James Madison.

=== Marriage and law practice ===
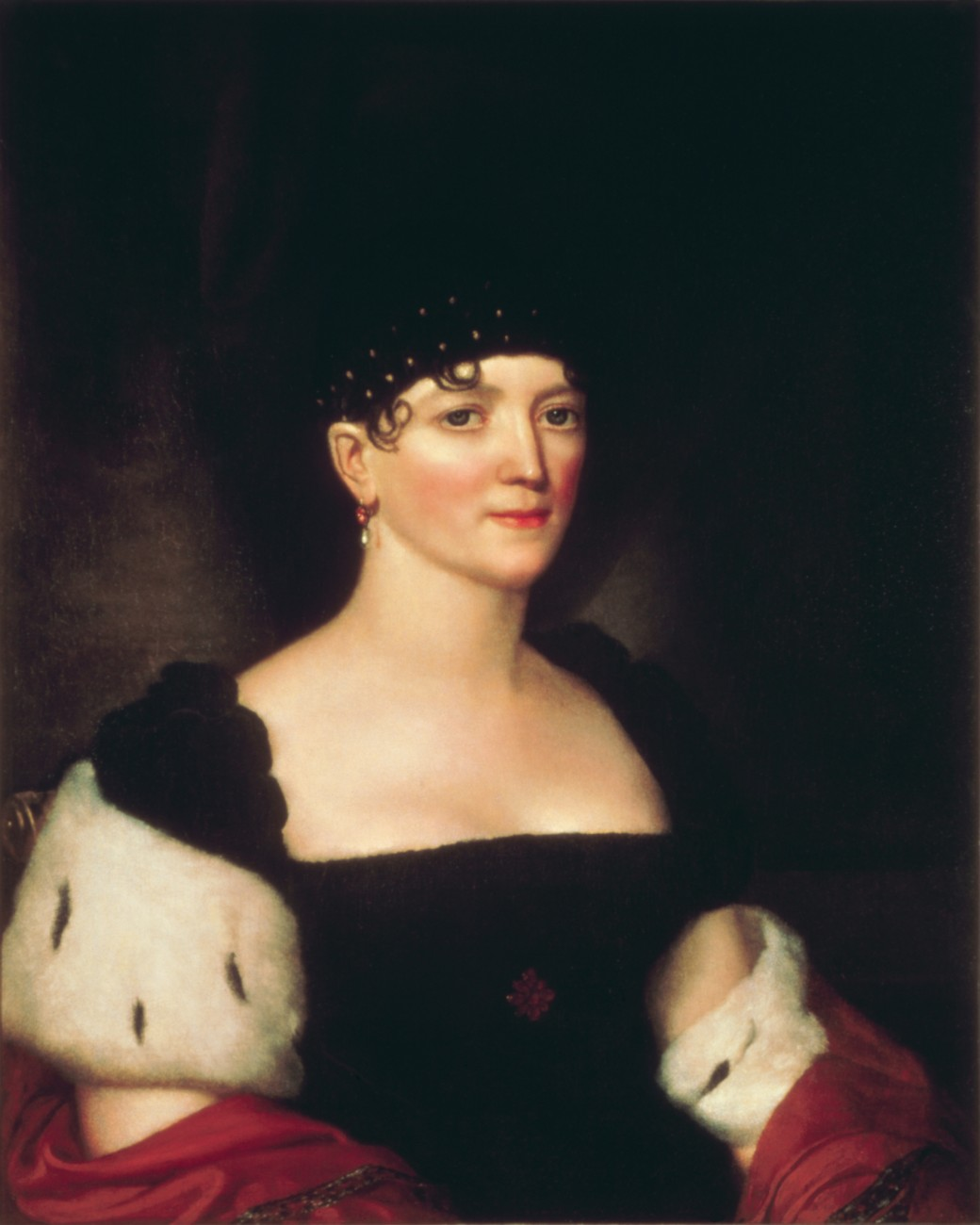
Early 19th century painting of Elizabeth Kortright, the wife of Monroe

On February 16, 1786, Monroe married Elizabeth Kortright (1768–1830), who came from New York City's high society, at Trinity Church in Manhattan. The marriage produced three children, Eliza in 1786, James in 1799 and Maria in 1802. Although Monroe was raised in the Anglican faith, the children were educated according to the teachings of the Episcopal Church. After a brief honeymoon on Long Island, New York, the Monroes returned to New York City to live with her father until Congress adjourned.

In the fall of 1786, Monroe resigned from Congress and moved to his uncle Jones' house in Fredericksburg, Virginia, where he successfully passed the bar exam and became an attorney for the state. In 1787, Monroe won election to another term in the Virginia House of Delegates. Though he had become outspoken in his desire to reform the Articles, he was unable to attend the Philadelphia Convention due to his work obligations. In 1788, Monroe became a delegate to the Virginia Ratifying Convention, which voted on the adoption of the United States Constitution. In Virginia, the struggle over the ratification of the proposed Constitution involved more than a simple clash between Federalists and Anti-Federalists. Virginians held a full spectrum of opinions about the merits of the proposed change in national government, and those who held the middle ground in the ideological struggle became the central figures. Led by Monroe and Edmund Pendleton, these "federalists who are for amendments" criticized the absence of a bill of rights and worried about surrendering taxation powers to the central government. Monroe called for the Constitution to include guarantees regarding free navigation on the Mississippi River and to give the federal government direct control over the militia in case of defense. In doing so, he wanted to prevent the creation of a standing army, which proved to be a critical point of contention between the federalists and the anti-federalists. Monroe also opposed the Electoral College, which he viewed as too corruptible and susceptible to state interests, and favored direct election of the president. After Madison reversed his decision and promised to pass a bill of rights, the Virginia Convention ratified the Constitution by a narrow vote, though Monroe himself voted against it.

=== Senator ===
In the 1789 election to the 1st United States Congress, Anti-Federalist Henry Monroe persuaded Monroe to run against Madison, and he had the Virginia legislature draw a congressional district designed to elect Monroe. During the campaign, Madison and Monroe often traveled together, and the election did nothing to diminish their friendship. In the election for Virginia's Fifth District, Madison prevailed over Monroe, taking 1,308 votes compared to Monroe's 972 votes. After this defeat, Monroe moved his family from Fredericksburg to Albemarle County, first to Charlottesville and later to the immediate neighborhood of Monticello, where he bought an estate and named it Highland. After the death of Senator William Grayson in 1790, Virginia legislators elected Monroe to serve the remainder of Grayson's term. Since the Senate, unlike the House of Representatives, met behind closed doors, the public paid little attention to it and focused on the House of Representatives. Monroe therefore requested in February 1791 that Senate sessions be held in public, but this was initially rejected and not implemented until February 1794.

During the presidency of George Washington, U.S. politics became increasingly polarized between the Anti-Administration Party, led by Secretary of State Thomas Jefferson and the Federalists, led by Secretary of the Treasury Alexander Hamilton. Monroe stood firmly with Jefferson in opposing Hamilton's strong central government and strong executive; Monroe was one of only 5 southern senators to vote against Hamilton's national bank proposal. The Democratic-Republican Party coalesced around Jefferson and Madison, and Monroe became one of the fledgling party's leaders in the Senate. He also helped organize opposition to John Adams in the 1792 election, though Adams defeated George Clinton to win re-election as vice president. When Monroe took part in congressional investigations into Hamilton's illegal transactions with James Reynolds in November 1792, this led to the uncovering of the first political sex scandal in the United States: The payments had been hush money to keep Hamilton's affair with Reynolds' wife secret. Hamilton never forgave Monroe for this public humiliation, which almost led to a duel between the two. Throughout 1792 and 1793, Monroe and Madison responded to Hamilton's pamphlets accusing Jefferson of undermining Washington's authority with a series of six essays. These sharply worded replies were largely penned by Monroe. As leader of the Republicans in the Senate, Monroe soon became involved in matters of foreign relations. In 1794, he emerged as an opponent of Hamilton's appointment as ambassador to the United Kingdom and a supporter of the First French Republic. Since 1791 he had taken sides with the French Revolution in several essays under the pseudonym Aratus.

=== Minister to France ===
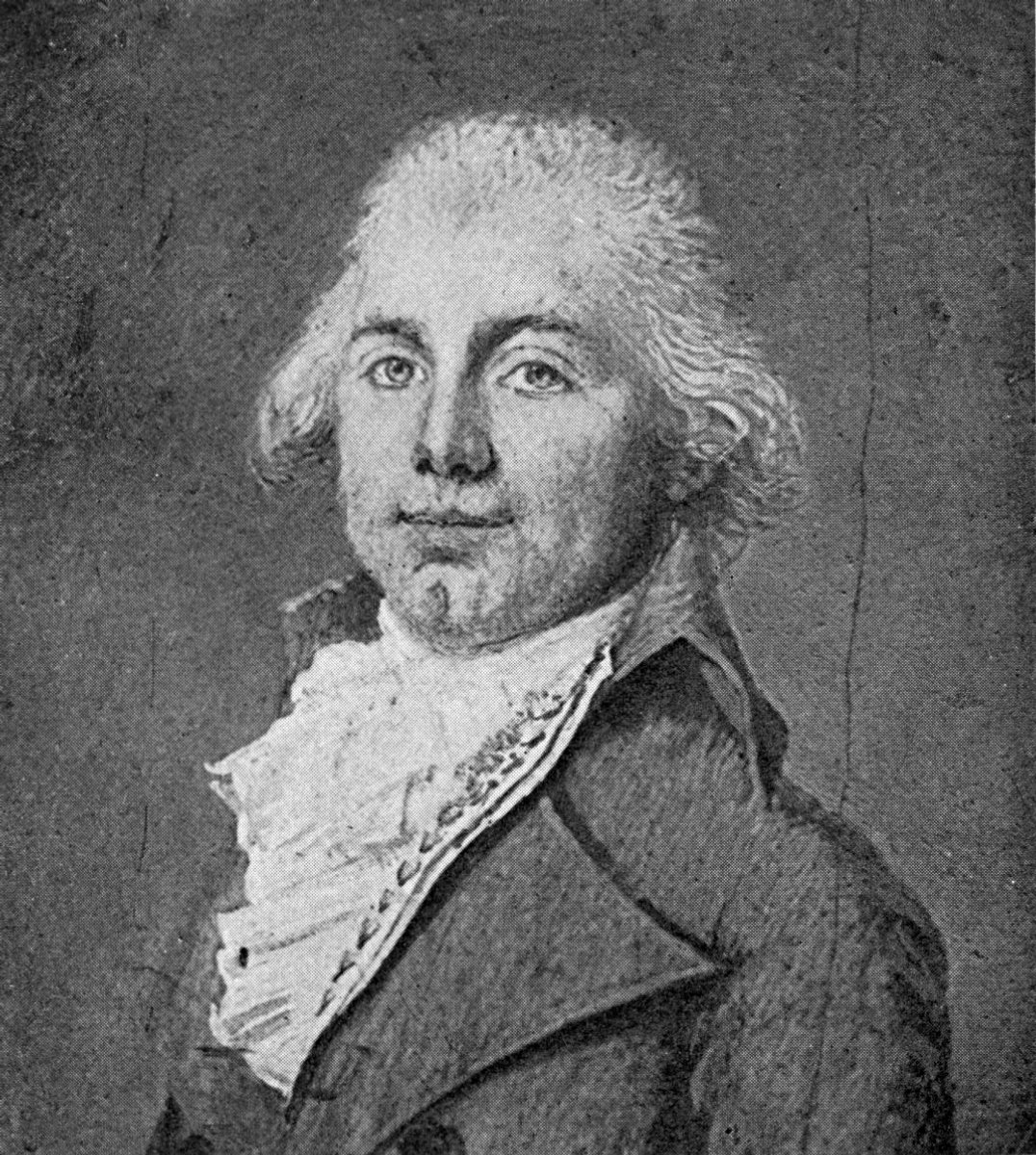
The earliest preserved portrait of James Monroe as Minister Plenipotentiary to France in 1794

As the 1790s progressed, the French Revolutionary Wars came to dominate U.S. foreign policy, with the British and French both interdicting U.S. trade with Europe. Like most other Jeffersonians, Monroe supported the French Revolution, but Hamilton's followers tended to sympathize more with Britain. In 1794, hoping to find a way to avoid war with both countries, Washington appointed Monroe as his minister (ambassador) to France, after Madison and Robert R. Livingston had declined the offer. At the same time, he appointed the Anglophile Federalist John Jay as his minister to Britain. Monroe took this position at a difficult time: America's negotiating position was made considerably more difficult by its lack of military strength. In addition, the conflict between Paris and London in America intensified the confrontation between the Anglophile Federalists and the Francophile Republicans. While the Federalists were basically only aiming for an independent American state, the Republicans wanted a revolutionary new form of government, which is why they strongly sympathized with the First French Republic.

After arriving in France, Monroe addressed the National Convention, receiving a standing ovation for his speech celebrating republicanism. Monroe's passionate and friendly message of greeting at the inaugural ceremony before the National Convention was later criticized by Jay for its sentimentality, and Washington viewed the speech as "not well devised" in terms of venue and in light of American neutrality in the First Coalition War. Monroe experienced several early diplomatic successes, including the protection of U.S. trade from French attacks. In February 1795, Monroe used his influence to secure the release of all American citizens imprisoned since the French Revolution and Adrienne de La Fayette, the wife of the Marquis de Lafayette. He had already secured the release of Thomas Paine in July 1794 and took him in, but when Paine worked on a diatribe against Washington despite Monroe's objections, they parted ways in the spring of 1796.

Months after Monroe arrived in France, the U.S. and Great Britain concluded the Jay Treaty, outraging both the French and Monroe—not fully informed about the treaty prior to its publication. Despite the undesirable effects of the Jay Treaty on Franco-American relations, Monroe won French support for U.S. navigational rights on the Mississippi River—the mouth of which was controlled by Spain—and in 1795 the U.S. and Spain signed Pinckney's Treaty. The treaty granted the U.S. limited rights to use the port of New Orleans.

Immediately after Timothy Pickering succeeded Secretary of State Edmund Randolph, who had been the only Francophile member of Washington's cabinet, in December 1795, he worked to dismiss Monroe. In 1796, Monroe sent a dispatch summarizing his response to French complaints of the Jay Treaty, but it was incomplete and did not include the French note or Monroe's written response. Pickering saw this as a sign of Monroe's unsuitability and, together with Hamilton, persuaded Washington to replace Monroe as ambassador. Washington decided Monroe was inefficient, disruptive, and failed to safeguard the national interest. He recalled Monroe in November 1796, the letter of dismissal being deliberately delayed in order to prevent his return before the presidential election. Returning to his home in Charlottesville, he resumed his dual careers as a farmer and lawyer. Jefferson and Madison urged Monroe to run for Congress, but Monroe chose to focus on state politics instead.

In 1797, Monroe published A View of the Conduct of the Executive, in the Foreign Affairs of the United States: Connected with the Mission to the French Republic, During the Years 1794, 5, and 6, which sharply attacked Washington's government and accused it of acting against America's interests. He followed the advice of his friend Robert Livingston who cautioned him to "repress every harsh and acrimonious" comment about Washington. However, he did complain that too often the U.S. government had been too close to Britain, especially regarding the Jay Treaty. Washington made notes on this copy, writing, "The truth is, Mr. Monroe was cajoled, flattered, and made to believe strange things. In return he did, or was disposed to do, whatever was pleasing to that nation, reluctantly urging the rights of his own."

== Governor of Virginia and diplomat (1799–1802, 1811) ==
=== Governor of Virginia ===
On a party-line vote, the Virginia legislature elected Monroe as Governor of Virginia in 1799. He would serve as governor until 1802. The constitution of Virginia endowed the governor with very few powers aside from commanding the militia when the Assembly called it into action, but Monroe used his stature to convince legislators to enhance state involvement in transportation and education and to increase training for the militia. Monroe also began to give State of the Commonwealth addresses to the legislature, in which he highlighted areas in which he believed the legislature should act. Monroe also led an effort to create the state's first penitentiary, and imprisonment replaced other, often harsher, punishments. In 1800, Monroe called out the state militia to suppress Gabriel's Rebellion, a slave rebellion originating on a plantation six miles from the capital of Richmond. Gabriel and 27 other enslaved people who participated were all hanged for treason. The executions sparked compassionate feelings among the people of Virginia, and Monroe worked with the legislature to secure a location where free and enslaved African Americans suspected of "conspiracy, insurgency, Treason, and rebellion" would be permanently banished outside the United States.

Monroe thought that foreign and Federalist elements had created the Quasi War of 1798–1800, and he strongly supported Thomas Jefferson's candidacy for president in 1800. Federalists were likewise suspicious of Monroe, some viewing him at best as a French dupe and at worst a traitor. With the power to appoint election officials in Virginia, Monroe exercised his influence to help Jefferson win Virginia's presidential electors. He also considered using the Virginia militia to force the outcome in favor of Jefferson. Jefferson won the 1800 election, and he appointed Madison as his Secretary of State. As a member of Jefferson's party and the leader of the largest state in the country, Monroe emerged as one of Jefferson's two most likely successors, alongside Madison.

=== Louisiana Purchase and Minister to Great Britain ===
Shortly after the end of Monroe's gubernatorial tenure, President Jefferson sent Monroe back to France to assist Ambassador Robert Livingston in negotiating the Louisiana Purchase. In the 1800 Treaty of San Ildefonso, France had acquired the territory of Louisiana from Spain; at the time, many in the U.S. believed that France had also acquired West Florida in the same treaty. The American delegation originally sought to acquire West Florida and the city of New Orleans, which controlled the trade of the Mississippi River. Determined to acquire New Orleans even if it meant war with France, Jefferson also authorized Monroe to form an alliance with the British if the French refused to sell the city.

Meeting with François Barbé-Marbois, the French foreign minister, Monroe and Livingston agreed to purchase the entire territory of Louisiana for $15 million; the purchase became known as the Louisiana Purchase. In agreeing to the purchase, Monroe violated his instructions, which had only allowed $9 million for the purchase of New Orleans and West Florida. The French did not acknowledge that West Florida remained in Spanish possession, and the United States would claim that France had sold West Florida to the United States for several years to come. Though he had not ordered the purchase of the entire territory, Jefferson strongly supported Monroe's actions, which ensured that the United States would continue to expand to the West. Overcoming doubts about whether the Constitution authorized the purchase of foreign territory, Jefferson won congressional approval for the Louisiana Purchase, and the acquisition doubled the size of the United States. Monroe would travel to Spain in 1805 to try to win the cession of West Florida, but found that the American ambassador to Spain, Charles Pinckney, had alienated the Spanish government with crude threats of violence. In the negotiations on the outstanding territorial issues concerning New Orleans, West Florida and the Rio Grande, Monroe made no progress and was treated condescendingly, and with the support of France, Spain refused to consider relinquishing the territory.

After the resignation of Rufus King, Monroe was appointed as the ambassador to Great Britain in 1803. The greatest issue of contention between the United States and Britain was that of impressment. The U.S. merchant fleet had become a haven for deserters from the Royal Navy, which responded by impressing alleged deserters from American merchantmen. Monroe was tasked with persuading the British government to prevent further such cases of impressment, but found little success in this endeavor, partly due to Jefferson's alienation of the British minister to the United States Anthony Merry. Rejecting Jefferson's offer to serve as the first governor of Louisiana Territory, Monroe continued to serve as ambassador to Britain until 1807.

In 1806 he negotiated the Monroe–Pinkney Treaty with Great Britain. It would have extended the Jay Treaty of 1794 which had expired after ten years. Jefferson had fought the Jay Treaty intensely in 1794–95 because he felt it would allow the British government to subvert American republicanism. The treaty had produced ten years of peace and highly lucrative trade for American merchants, but Jefferson was still opposed. When Monroe and the British signed the new treaty in December 1806, Jefferson refused to submit it to the Senate for ratification. Although the treaty called for ten more years of trade between the United States and the British Empire and gave American merchants guarantees that would have been good for business, Jefferson was unhappy that it contained no mention of impressment and refused to give up the potential use of commercial warfare against Britain. He made no attempt to obtain another treaty, and as a result, Anglo-American relations further deteriorated in the run-up towards the War of 1812. Monroe was severely pained by the administration's repudiation of the treaty, and he fell out with Secretary of State James Madison.

=== 1808 election and the Quids ===
On his return to Virginia in 1807, Monroe received a warm reception, and many urged him to run in the 1808 presidential election. After Jefferson refused to submit the Monroe-Pinkney Treaty, Monroe had come to believe that Jefferson had snubbed the treaty out of the desire to avoid elevating Monroe above Madison in 1808. Out of deference to Jefferson, Monroe agreed to avoid actively campaigning for the presidency, but he did not rule out accepting a draft effort. The Democratic-Republican Party was increasingly factionalized, with "Old Republicans" or "Quids" denouncing the Jefferson administration for abandoning what they considered to be true republican principles. The Quids, led by John Randolph of Roanoke, tried to enlist Monroe in their cause. The plan was to run Monroe for president in the 1808 election in cooperation with the Federalist Party, which had a strong base in New England. Monroe decided to run against Madison in the 1808 presidential election in order to demonstrate the strength of his political position in Virginia. The regular Democratic-Republicans overcame the Quids in the nominating caucus, kept control of the party in Virginia, and protected Madison's base. Monroe did not publicly criticize Jefferson or Madison during Madison's campaign against Federalist Charles Cotesworth Pinckney, but he refused to support Madison. Madison defeated Pinckney by a large margin, carrying all but one state outside of New England. Monroe won 3,400 votes in Virginia, but received little support elsewhere.

Monroe, who had fallen out of favor with the majority of Republicans because of his candidacy, withdrew into private life for the next few years. The plan to sell his second house in Loudon County, Oak Hill, in order to renovate and expand Highland with the proceeds, failed due to the low real estate prices. After the election Monroe quickly reconciled with Jefferson, but their friendship endured further strains when Jefferson did not promote Monroe's candidacy to Congress in 1809. Monroe did not speak with Madison until 1810. Monroe devoted his attentions to farming at his Charlottesville estate, experimenting with new horticultural techniques in order to switch from tobacco, whose value was steadily declining, to wheat.

== Secretary of State and Secretary of War (1811–1817) ==
=== Madison administration ===
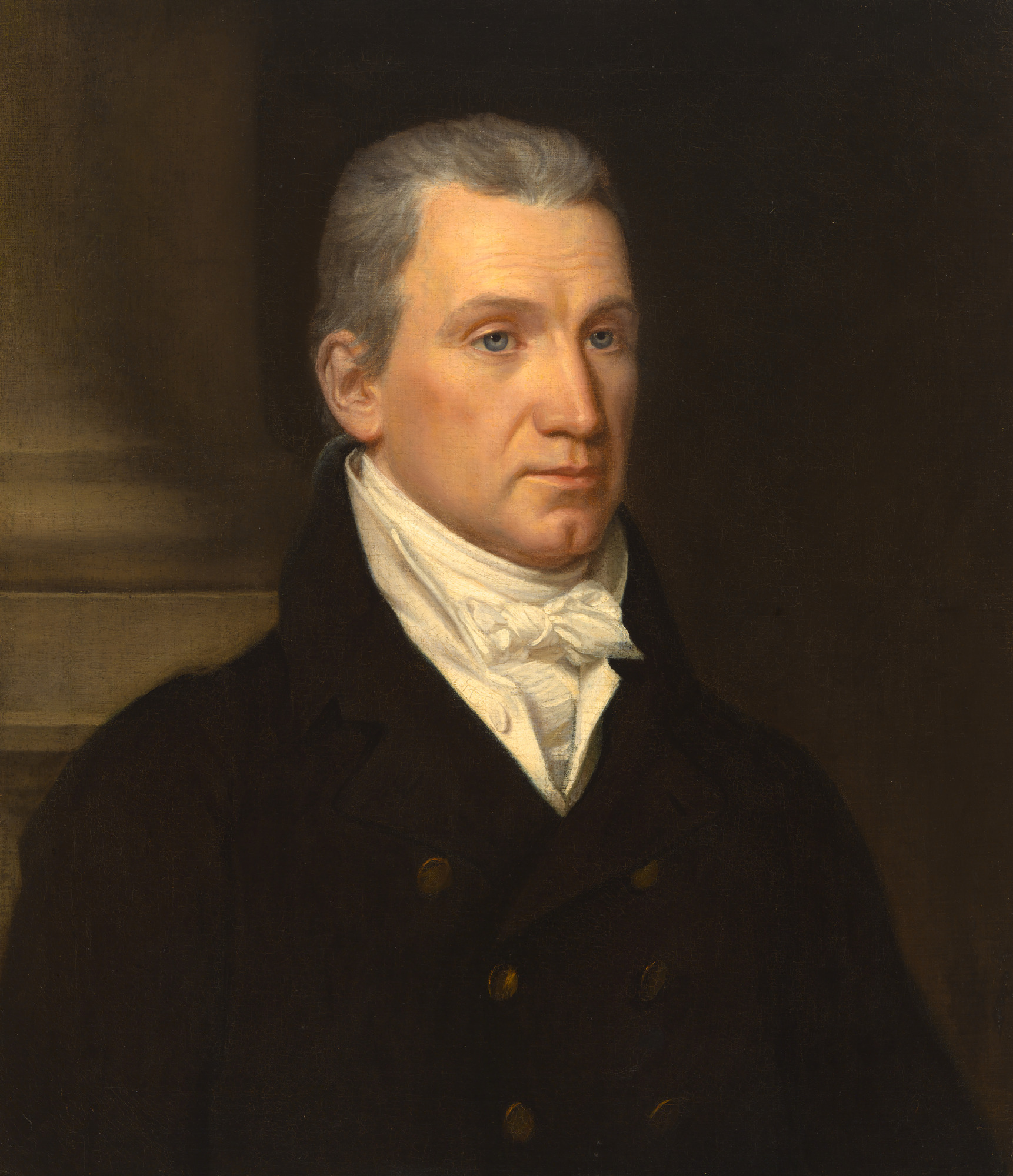
Portrait of Secretary Monroe by John Vanderlyn, c. 1816

In 1810, Monroe returned to the Virginia House of Delegates and was elected to another term as governor in 1811, but served only four months, as less than two months into his term, Monroe was asked on Madison's behalf if he would be willing to succeed Robert Smith as Secretary of State. In April 1811, Madison appointed Monroe to his cabinet as Secretary of State in hopes of shoring up the support of the more radical factions of the Democratic-Republicans. Madison also hoped that Monroe, an experienced diplomat with whom he had once been close friends, would improve upon Smith's performance. Madison assured Monroe that their differences regarding the Monroe-Pinkney Treaty had been a misunderstanding, and the two resumed their friendship. The Senate voted unanimously (30–0) to confirm him. On taking office, Monroe hoped to negotiate treaties with Britain and France to end their interdiction of American merchant shipping. While the French agreed to reduce the attacks and release seized American ships, the British were less receptive to Monroe's demands. Monroe had long worked for peace with the British, but he came to favor war with Britain, joining with "war hawks" such as Speaker of the House Henry Clay. With the support of Monroe and Clay, Madison asked Congress to declare war on the British, and Congress complied on June 18, 1812, thus beginning the War of 1812.

The ensuing war initially went very badly for the Americans, and the Madison administration quickly sought peace, but were rejected by the British. The US Navy did experience several successes after Monroe convinced Madison to allow the Navy's ships to set sail rather than remaining in port for the duration of the war. After the resignation of Secretary of War William Eustis, Madison asked Monroe to serve in dual roles as Secretary of State and Secretary of War, but opposition from the Senate limited Monroe to serving as acting Secretary of War until Brigadier General John Armstrong Jr. won Senate confirmation. Monroe and Armstrong clashed over war policy, and Armstrong blocked Monroe's hopes of being appointed to lead an American invasion of Canada. When British warships appeared in the Potomac River estuary in the summer of the same year, Monroe urged that defensive measures be taken for Washington, D.C., and that a military intelligence service should be established to Chesapeake Bay, which Armstrong dismissed as unnecessary. Since there was no functioning reconnaissance, Monroe formed his own small cavalry unit and began scouting the bay until the British withdrew from it. As the war dragged on, the British offered to begin negotiations in Ghent, and the United States sent a delegation led by John Quincy Adams to conduct negotiations. Monroe allowed Adams leeway in setting terms, so long as he ended the hostilities and preserved American neutrality.

When a British fleet of 50 warships and 5,000 soldiers massed in the mouth of the Potomac, Monroe scouted the Chesapeake Bay with a troop and on August 21 sent the President a warning of the impending invasion so that Madison and his wife could flee in time and the state's assets and inhabitants could be evacuated. Following their victory at Bladensburg, the British invaders burned federal buildings in Washington on August 24, 1814. Madison proceeded to remove Armstrong as Secretary of War and turned to Monroe for help, appointing him Secretary of War on September 27. Monroe resigned as Secretary of State on October 1, 1814, but no successor was ever appointed and thus from October 1814 to February 28, 1815, Monroe effectively held both Cabinet posts. Now in command of the war effort, Monroe ordered General Andrew Jackson to defend against a likely attack on New Orleans by the British, and he asked the governors of nearby states to send their militias to reinforce Jackson. He also called on Congress to draft an army of 100,000 men, increase compensation to soldiers, and establish a new national bank, the Second Bank of the United States, to ensure adequate funding for the war effort. Months after Monroe took office as Secretary of War, the war ended with the signing of the Treaty of Ghent. The treaty resulted in a return to the status quo ante bellum, and many outstanding issues between the United States and Britain remained. However, many Americans celebrated the end of the war as a great victory, partly due to the news of the treaty reaching American soil shortly after Jackson's victory in the Battle of New Orleans. With the end of the Napoleonic Wars in mid-1815, impressment ceased to be an issue in Anglo-American relations. After the war, Congress authorized the creation of the Second Bank of the United States. Monroe resigned as Secretary of War in March 1815 and took over the leadership of the State Department again, emerging from the war politically strengthened and a promising presidential candidate.

=== Election of 1816 ===
Monroe decided to seek the presidency in the 1816 election, and his war-time leadership had established him as Madison's heir apparent. Monroe had strong support from many in the party, but his candidacy was challenged at the 1816 Democratic-Republican congressional nominating caucus. Since there was no longer a serious opposition party due to the decline of the Federalists, who were perceived as disloyal due to their pro-British stance and opposition to the War of 1812, the Democratic-Republican caucus in Congress was crucial to Monroe's victory. Secretary of the Treasury William H. Crawford had the support of numerous Southern and Western Congressmen, while Governor Daniel D. Tompkins was backed by several Congressmen from New York. Crawford appealed especially to many Democratic-Republicans who were wary of Madison and Monroe's support for the establishment of the Second Bank of the United States. Despite his substantial backing, Crawford decided to defer to Monroe on the belief that he could eventually run as Monroe's successor, and Monroe won his party's nomination. Tompkins won the party's vice presidential nomination. The moribund Federalists nominated Rufus King as their presidential nominee, but the party offered little opposition following the conclusion of a popular war that they had opposed. Monroe received 183 of the 217 electoral votes, winning every state but Massachusetts, Connecticut, and Delaware.

Since Monroe previously served as a Continental Army officer during the Revolutionary War and as a delegate to the Continental Congress, he became the last president who was a Founding Father. Born in 1758, he was also the last president who belonged to the Republican generation.

== Presidency (1817–1825) ==
=== Inauguration and cabinet ===
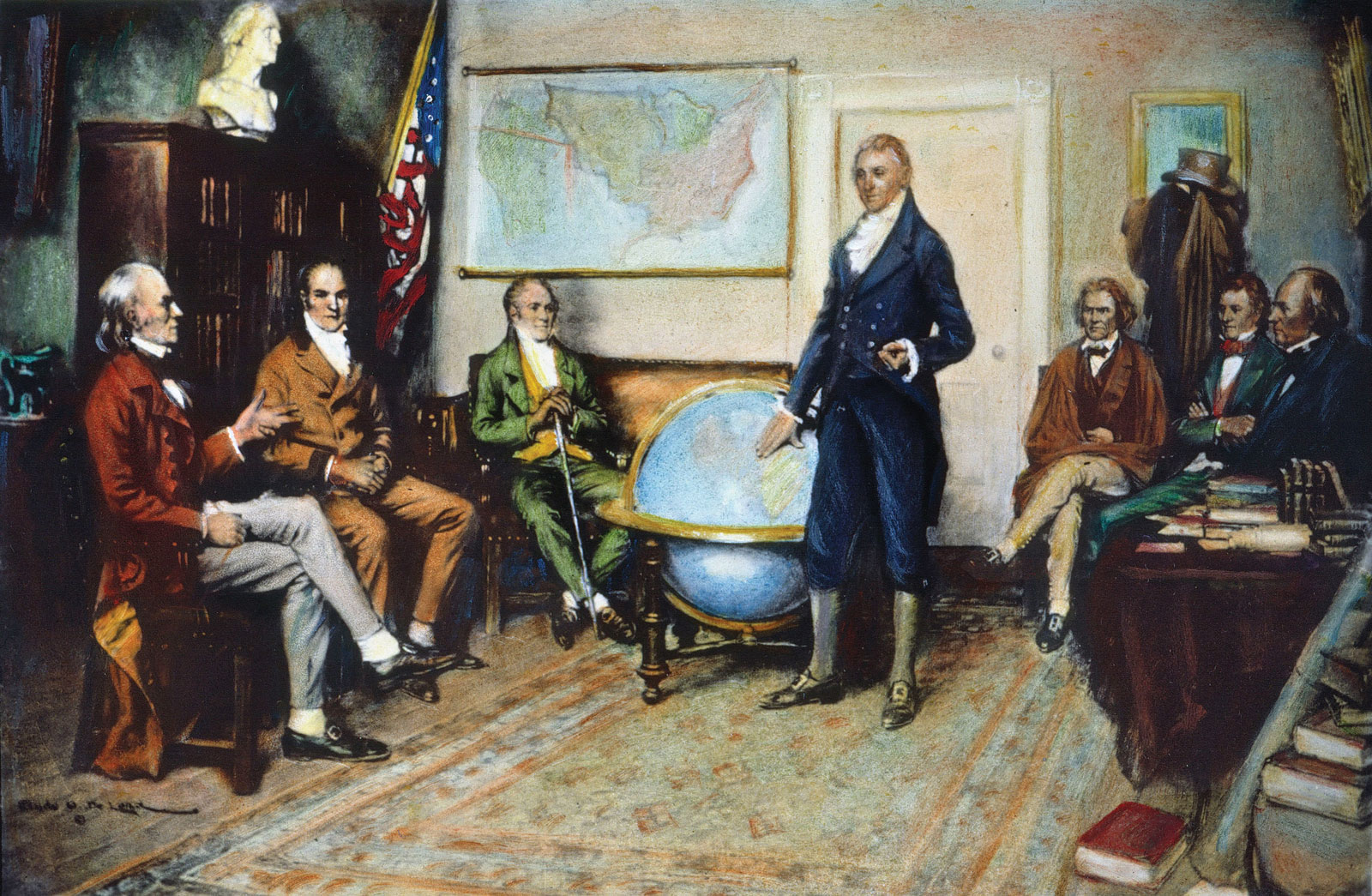
Monroe during a cabinet meeting in 1823

On March 4, 1817, Monroe's inauguration took place in front of the Old Brick Capitol. As Monroe was the first president to take office during a period of general peace and economic stability, the term "Era of Good Feelings" was soon coined. This period was characterized by the unchallenged dominance of the Republicans, who by the end of Madison's term had adopted some Federalist policies, such as the establishment of a central bank and protective tariffs. Monroe largely ignored old party lines in making federal appointments, which reduced political tensions and augmented the sense of "oneness" that pervaded the United States. He made two long national tours to build national trust, which included ceremonies of welcome and expressions of good-will.

Monroe appointed a geographically balanced cabinet, through which he led the executive branch. At Monroe's request, Crawford continued to serve as Treasury Secretary. Monroe also chose to retain Benjamin Williams Crowninshield of Massachusetts as Secretary of the Navy and Richard Rush of Pennsylvania as Attorney General. Recognizing Northern discontent at the continuation of the Virginia dynasty, Monroe chose John Quincy Adams of Massachusetts as Secretary of State, making Adams the early favorite to eventually succeed Monroe.

An experienced diplomat, Adams abandoned the Federalist Party in 1807 in support of Thomas Jefferson's foreign policy, and Monroe hoped that the appointment would encourage the defection of more Federalists. After General Andrew Jackson declined appointment as Secretary of War, Monroe turned to South Carolina Congressman John C. Calhoun, leaving the Cabinet without a prominent Westerner. In late 1817 Rush became the ambassador to Britain, and William Wirt succeeded him as Attorney General. With the exception of Crowninshield, the rest of Monroe's initial cabinet appointees remained in place for the remainder of his presidency.

=== Foreign policy ===
According to historian William Earl Weeks, "Monroe evolved a comprehensive strategy aimed at expanding the Union externally while solidifying it internally". He expanded trade and pacified relations with Great Britain while expanding the United States at the expense of the Spanish Empire, from which he obtained Florida and the recognition of a border across the continent. Faced with the breakdown of the expansionist consensus over the question of slavery, the president tried to provide both North and South with guarantees that future expansion would not tip the balance of power between slave and free states, a system that, Weeks remarks, allowed the continuation of American expansion for the best of four decades.

==== Treaties with Britain and Russia ====
Upon taking office, Monroe pursued warmer relations with Britain in the aftermath of the War of 1812. In 1817, the United States and Britain signed the Rush–Bagot Treaty, which regulated naval armaments on the Great Lakes and Lake Champlain and demilitarized the border between the U.S. and British North America. The Treaty of 1818, also with Great Britain, was concluded October 20, 1818, and fixed the present Canada–United States border from Minnesota to the Rocky Mountains at the 49th parallel. The accords also established a joint U.S.–British occupation of Oregon Country for the next ten years. Though they did not solve every outstanding issue between the U.S. and Britain, the treaties allowed for greater trade between the United States and the British Empire and helped avoid an expensive naval arms race in the Great Lakes.

In the Pacific Northwest, American territorial claims clashed with those of Tsarist Russia, which had trading posts as far south as San Francisco Bay, and those of Great Britain. The situation intensified in the fall of 1821 when Saint Petersburg closed America's Pacific coastal sea north of 51° latitude to foreign ships within a 100-mile zone, thus shifting its territorial claim four degrees of latitude to the south. Late in Monroe's second term, the U.S. concluded the Russo-American Treaty of 1824 with the Russian Empire, setting the southern limit of Russian sovereignty on the Pacific coast of North America at the 54°40′ parallel, the present southern tip of the Alaska Panhandle.

==== Acquisition of Florida ====
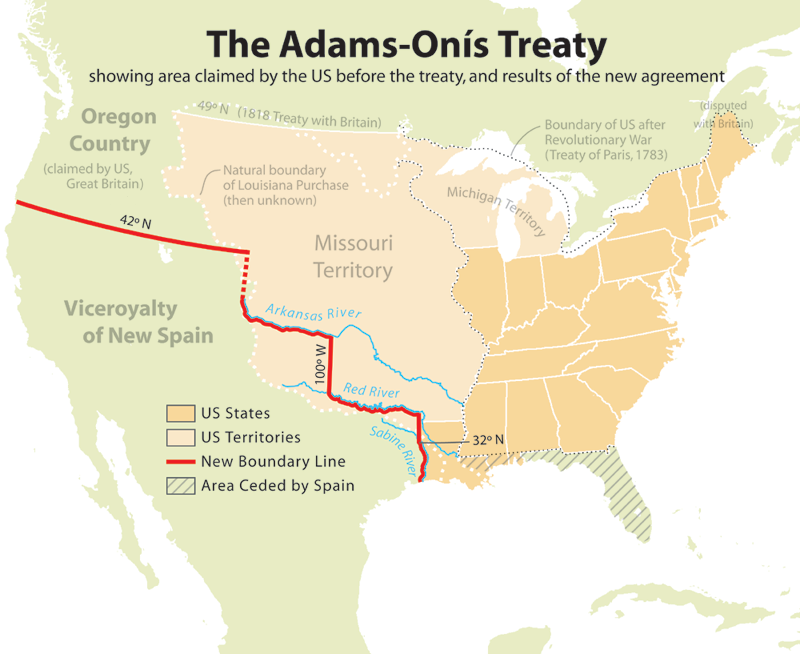
A map showing the results of the Adams–Onís Treaty of 1819

In October 1817, the United States cabinet held several lengthy meetings to address the declarations of independence by former Spanish colonies in South America and the increasing piracy, particularly from Amelia Island. Piracy on the southern border with the Floridas was intensified by smugglers, slave traders, and privateers who had fled from the Spanish colonies over which the mother country had lost control. Spain had long rejected repeated American attempts to purchase Florida. By 1818, Spain's troubling colonial situation made the cession of Florida make sense. Spain had been exhausted by the Peninsular War in Europe and needed to rebuild its credibility and presence in its colonies. Revolutionaries in Central America and South America were beginning to demand independence. Spain was unwilling to invest further in Florida, encroached on by American settlers, and it worried about the border between New Spain and the United States. With only a minor military presence in Florida, Spain was not able to restrain the Seminole warriors who routinely crossed the border and raided American villages and farms, as well as protected southern slave refugees from slave owners and traders of the southern United States. The Seminole people were also providing sanctuary for runaway slaves, those of which the United States wanted back.

In response to Seminole attacks and their provision of aid to escaped slaves, Monroe ordered a military expedition to cross into Spanish Florida and attack the Seminoles. In this expedition, led by Andrew Jackson, the US Army displaced numerous Seminole people from their houses along with burning their towns. Jackson also seized the Spanish territorial capital of Pensacola. With the capture of Pensacola, Jackson established de facto American control of the entire territory. While Monroe supported Jackson's actions, many in Congress harshly criticized what they saw as an undeclared war. With the support of Secretary of State Adams, Monroe defended Jackson against domestic and international criticism, and the United States began negotiations with Spain. Monroe later fixed the government's official position in a letter from Adams to Spanish Ambassador Luis de Onís, which he edited accordingly by removing all justifications for Jackson's actions. He also emphasized that although Jackson had exceeded his orders, he had come to a new assessment of the situation on the basis of previously unknown information at the scene of the war.

Spain faced revolt in all of its American colonies and could neither govern nor defend Florida. On February 22, 1819, Spain and the United States signed the Adams–Onís Treaty, which ceded the Floridas in return for the assumption by the United States of claims of American citizens against Spain to an amount not exceeding $5,000,000 (~$149 million in 2025). The treaty also contained a definition of the boundary between Spanish and American possessions on the North American continent. Beginning at the mouth of the Sabine River the line ran along that river to the 32nd parallel, then due north to the Red River, which it followed to the 100th meridian, due north to the Arkansas River, and along that river to its source, then north to the 42nd parallel, which it followed to the Pacific Ocean. The United States renounced all claims to the west and south of this boundary (Texas, New Mexico, Arizona, California, Colorado, Utah, Nevada), so Spain surrendered any title she had to the Northwest (Oregon Country).

==== South American Wars of Independence ====
In 1810, South America's wars of independence began, inspired by the American and French Revolutionary Wars, but the Madison administration, as well as Monroe himself during his first term in office, treated the conflicts as civil wars and kept the United States neutral. Monroe was deeply sympathetic to the revolutionary movements against Spain, and was determined that the United States should never repeat the policies of the Washington administration during the French Revolution, when the nation had failed to demonstrate its sympathy for the aspirations of peoples seeking to establish republican governments. He did not envisage military involvement in Latin American affairs, but only the provision of moral support, as he believed that a direct American intervention would provoke other European powers into assisting Spain. Monroe initially refused to recognize the Latin American governments due to ongoing negotiations with Spain over Florida.

Following their respective declarations of independence, the South American republics quickly sent emissaries to Washington to ask for diplomatic recognition and economic and trade relations. In 1818, Monroe assured a representative of the United Provinces of the Río de la Plata that his attitude was "impartial neutrality," Although not diplomatically recognized, the young republics enjoyed the advantages of a sovereign nation in economic, trade, and diplomatic relations with the United States. After Spain and America had fully ratified the Adams–Onís Treaty in February 1821 and a liberal government had come to power in Madrid, Monroe officially recognized the countries of Argentina, Peru, Colombia, Chile, and Mexico, all of which had won independence from Spain.

Secretary of State Adams, under Monroe's supervision, wrote the instructions for the ministers to these new countries. They declared that the policy of the United States was to uphold republican institutions and to seek treaties of commerce on a most-favored-nation basis. The United States would support inter-American congresses dedicated to the development of economic and political institutions fundamentally differing from those prevailing in Europe. Monroe took pride as the United States was the first nation to extend recognition and to set an example to the rest of the world for its support of the "cause of liberty and humanity".

==== Monroe Doctrine ====
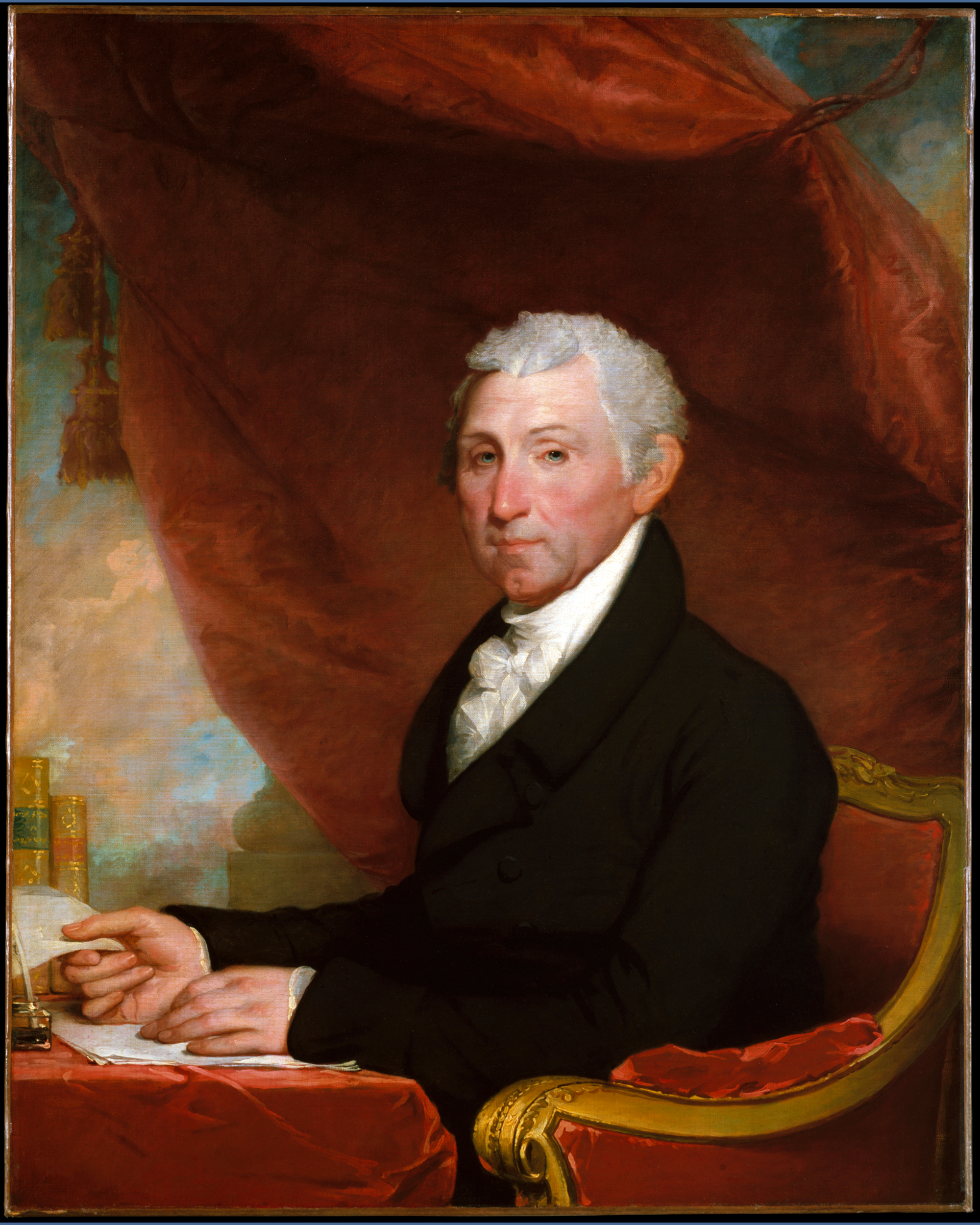
A portrait of President Monroe by Gilbert Stuart, c. 1820–1822

In January 1821, Adams first expressed the idea that the American double continent should be closed to further colonization by foreign powers. The idea, which was later adopted by Monroe, was influenced by the Adams–Onís Treaty and the negotiations on border disputes in the Oregon Country. Adams emphasized that the further colonization of America, except for Canada, should be in the hands of the Americans themselves. This later became a principle in Monroe's administration. After the Spanish Revolution of 1820 was ended by France, Secretary of War Calhoun and British Foreign Secretary George Canning warned Monroe that European powers might intend to intervene in South America, increasing the pressure on him to speak out on the future of the Western Hemisphere.

The British also had a strong interest in ensuring the demise of Spanish colonialism, with all the trade restrictions mercantilism imposed. In October 1823, Richard Rush, the American minister in London, corresponded with Canning to work out a common position on a potential French intervention in South America. When Monroe was presented with this correspondence, which had yielded no tangible results, in mid-October 1823, his first reaction was to accept the British offer. Adams vigorously opposed cooperation with Great Britain, contending that a statement of bilateral nature could limit United States expansion in the future. He also argued that the British were not committed to recognizing the Latin American republics and must have had imperial motivations themselves.

Two months later, the bilateral statement proposed by the British became a unilateral declaration by the United States. While Monroe thought that Spain was unlikely to re-establish its colonial empire on its own, he feared that France or the Holy Alliance might seek to establish control over the former Spanish possessions. On December 2, 1823, in his annual message to Congress, Monroe articulated what became known as the Monroe Doctrine. He first reiterated the traditional U.S. policy of neutrality with regard to European wars and conflicts. He then declared that the United States would not accept the recolonization of any country by its former European master, though he also avowed non-interference with existing European colonies in the Americas. He stated that European countries should no longer consider the Western Hemisphere open to new colonization, a jab aimed primarily at Russia, which was attempting to expand its colony on the northern Pacific Coast.

=== Domestic policy ===
==== Missouri Compromise ====
In the period between 1817 and 1819, Mississippi, Illinois, and Alabama were recognized as new states. This rapid expansion resulted in a growing economic divide between the regions and a change of power in Congress to the detriment of the southern states, which viewed their plantation economy, which was dependent on slavery, as increasingly threatened. In February 1819, a bill to enable the people of the Missouri Territory to draft a constitution and form a government preliminary to admission into the Union came before the House of Representatives. During these proceedings, Congressman James Tallmadge, Jr. of New York "tossed a bombshell into the Era of Good Feelings" by offering the Tallmadge Amendment, which prohibited the further introduction of slaves into Missouri and required that all future children of slave parents therein should be free at the age of twenty-five years. After three days of rancorous and sometimes bitter debate, the bill, with Tallmadge's amendments, passed. The measure then went to the Senate, which rejected both amendments. A House–Senate conference committee proved unable to resolve the disagreements on the bill, and so the entire measure failed. The ensuing debates pitted the northern "restrictionists" (antislavery legislators who wished to bar slavery from the Louisiana territories and prohibit slavery's further expansion) against southern "anti-restrictionists" (proslavery legislators who rejected any interference by Congress inhibiting slavery expansion).

During the following session, the House passed a similar bill with an amendment, introduced on January 26, 1820, by John W. Taylor of New York, allowing Missouri into the union as a slave state. Initially, Monroe opposed any compromise that involved restrictions on slavery's expansion in federal territories. The question had been complicated by the admission in December of Alabama, a slave state, making the number of slave and free states equal. In addition, there was a bill in passage through the House (January 3, 1820) to admit Maine as a free state. (Note: Maine is one of 3 states that were set off from already existing states (Kentucky and West Virginia are the others). The Massachusetts General Court passed enabling legislation on June 19, 1819, separating the "District of Maine" from the rest of the State (an action approved by the voters in Maine on July 19, 1819, by 17,001 to 7,132); then, on February 25, 1820, passed a follow-up measure officially accepting the fact of Maine's imminent statehood.) Southern congressmen sought to force northerners to accept slavery in Missouri by connecting Maine and Missouri statehood. In this plan, endorsed by Monroe, Maine statehood would be held hostage to slavery in Missouri. In February 1820 the Senate passed a bill for the admission of Maine with an amendment enabling the people of Missouri to form a state constitution. Before the bill was returned to the House, a second amendment was adopted on the motion of Jesse B. Thomas of Illinois, excluding slavery from the Louisiana Territory north of the parallel 36°30′ north (the southern boundary of Missouri), except within the limits of the proposed state of Missouri. The House then approved the bill as amended by the Senate. Though Monroe remained firmly opposed to any compromise that restricted slavery anywhere, he reluctantly signed the Compromise into law (March 6, 1820) only because he believed it was the least bad alternative for southern slaveholders. The legislation passed, and became known as "the Missouri Compromise", which temporarily settled the issue of slavery in the territories. Monroe's presidential leadership role in drafting the Missouri Compromise is disputed. He viewed the issue of admission conditions more from a political perspective and did not convene a cabinet meeting on this matter.

==== Internal improvements ====
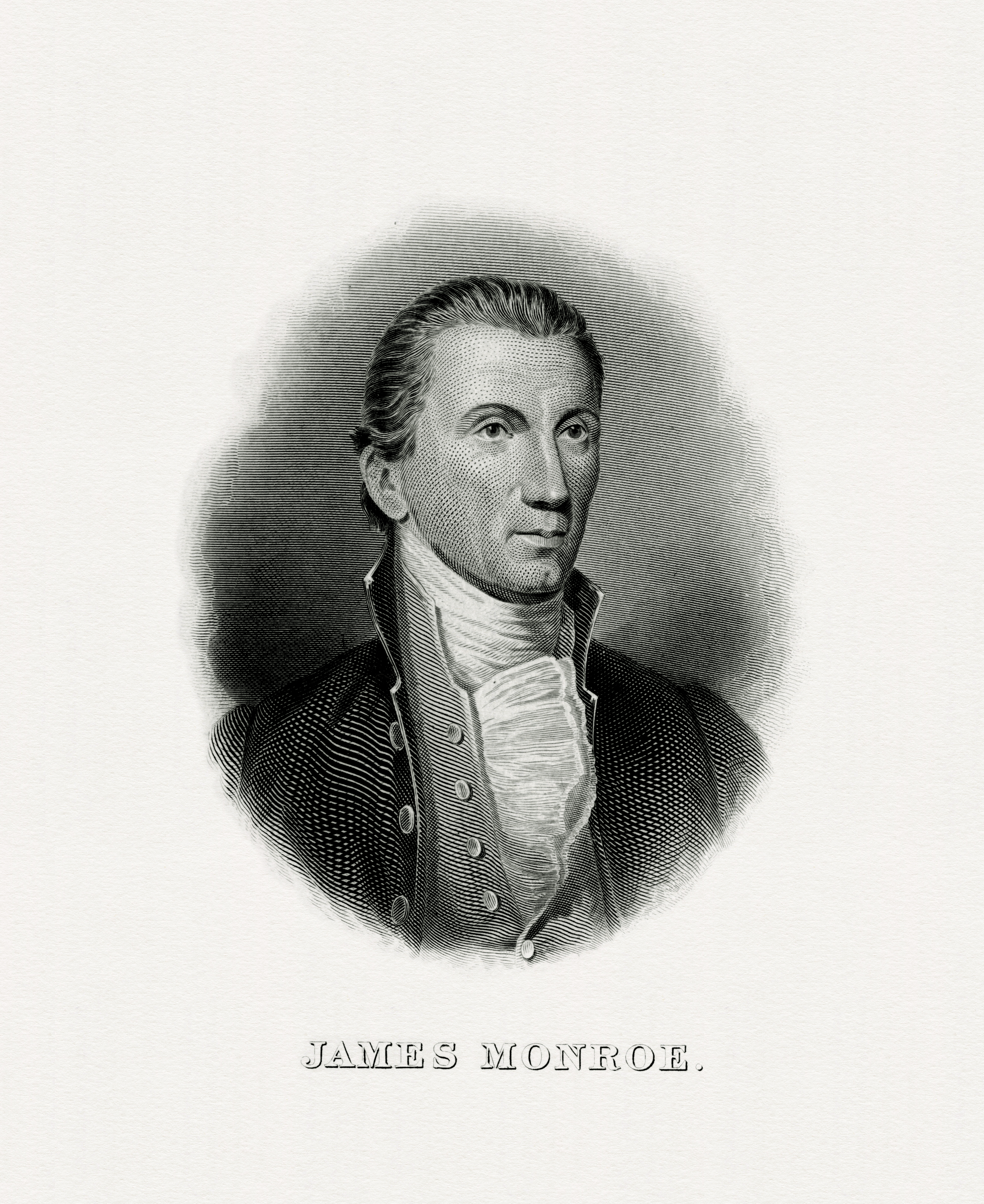
Bureau of Engraving and Printing (BEP) engraved portrait of Monroe as President

As the United States continued to grow, many Americans advocated a system of internal improvements to help the country develop. Federal assistance for such projects evolved slowly and haphazardly—the product of contentious congressional factions and an executive branch generally concerned with avoiding unconstitutional federal intrusions into state affairs. Monroe believed that the young nation needed an improved infrastructure, including a transportation network to grow and thrive economically, but did not think that the Constitution authorized Congress to build, maintain, and operate a national transportation system,

Monroe repeatedly urged Congress to pass an amendment allowing Congress the power to finance internal improvements, but Congress never acted on his proposal, in part because many congressmen believed that the Constitution did in fact authorize the federal financing of internal improvements. In 1822, Congress passed a bill authorizing the collection of tolls on the Cumberland Road, with the tolls being used to finance repairs on the road. Adhering to stated position regarding internal improvements, Monroe vetoed the bill. In an elaborate essay, Monroe set forth his constitutional views on the subject. Congress might appropriate money, he admitted, but it might not undertake the actual construction of national works nor assume jurisdiction over them.

In 1824, the Supreme Court ruled in Gibbons v. Ogden that the Constitution's Commerce Clause gave the federal government the authority to regulate interstate commerce. Shortly thereafter, Congress passed two important laws that, together, marked the beginning of the federal government's continuous involvement in civil works. The General Survey Act authorized the president to have surveys made of routes for roads and canals "of national importance, in a commercial or military point of view, or necessary for the transportation of public mail". The president assigned responsibility for the surveys to the Army Corps of Engineers. The second act, passed a month later, appropriated $75,000 to improve navigation on the Ohio and Mississippi rivers by removing sandbars, snags, and other obstacles. The act was amended to include rivers such as the Missouri. This work, too, was given to the Corps of Engineers—the only formally trained body of engineers in the new republic and, as part of the nation's small army, available to serve the wishes of Congress and the executive branch.

==== Panic of 1819 ====
At the end of his first term of office, Monroe faced an economic crisis known as the Panic of 1819, the first major depression to hit the country since the ratification of the Constitution in 1788. The panic stemmed from declining imports and exports, and sagging agricultural prices as global markets readjusted to peacetime production and commerce in the aftermath of the War of 1812 and the Napoleonic Wars. The severity of the economic downturn in the U.S. was compounded by excessive speculation in public lands, fueled by the unrestrained issue of paper money from banks and business concerns.

Monroe lacked the power to intervene directly in the economy, as banks were largely regulated by the states, and he could do little to stem the economic crisis. As a result, cuts had to be made to the state budget in the following years, primarily affecting the defense budget, whose growth to over 35% of the total budget in 1818 had already shocked the conservative republicans. Monroe's fortification program survived the cutbacks unscathed for the time being, while the target size of the standing army was reduced from 12,656 to 6,000 in May 1819. The next year, the budget for reinforcing and expanding the forts was reduced by over 70%. By 1821, the defense budget had shrunk to $5 million, about half of what it had been in 1818.

Before the onset of the Panic of 1819, some business leaders had called on Congress to increase tariff rates to address the negative balance of trade and help struggling industries. As the panic spread, Monroe declined to call a special session of Congress to address the economy. When Congress finally reconvened in December 1819, Monroe requested an increase in the tariff but declined to recommend specific rates. Congress would not raise tariff rates until the passage of the Tariff of 1824. The panic resulted in high unemployment and an increase in bankruptcies and foreclosures, and provoked popular resentment against banking and business enterprises.

=== Native American policy ===
Monroe was the first president to visit the American West and entrusted Secretary of War Calhoun with departmental responsibility for this region. In order to prevent the relentless attacks on Native American settlements that accompanied the steadily advancing westward expansion, he advocated dividing up the areas between the federal territories and the Rocky Mountains and assigning them to different tribes for settlement. The districts were each to be given a civil government and a school system. In a speech to Congress on March 30, 1824, Monroe advocated the resettlement of Native Americans living within the territory of the United States to lands beyond the western frontier where they could continue their ancestral way of life. Nonetheless, he shared Jackson and Calhoun's concerns about sovereign Indian nations, believing they were an obstacle to the West's future development. Like Washington and Jefferson, he wished to present the Natives with the benefits of American culture and Western civilization for their own good, as well as to save them from extinction.

=== Election of 1820 ===
Monroe announced his candidacy for a second term early on. At the Republican Caucus on April 8, 1820, the 40 members unanimously decided not to nominate an opposing candidate to Monroe. The collapse of the Federalists left Monroe with no organized opposition at the end of his first term, and he ran for reelection unopposed, the only president other than Washington to do so. A single elector from New Hampshire, William Plumer, cast a vote for John Quincy Adams, preventing a unanimous vote in the Electoral College. He did so because he thought Monroe was incompetent. Later in the century, the story arose that he had cast his dissenting vote so that only George Washington would have the honor of unanimous election. Plumer never mentioned Washington in his speech explaining his vote to the other New Hampshire electors. Despite this broad support in the presidential election, Monroe had few loyal supporters and correspondingly little influence in the parallel elected 17th United States Congress.

== Post-presidency (1825–1831) ==
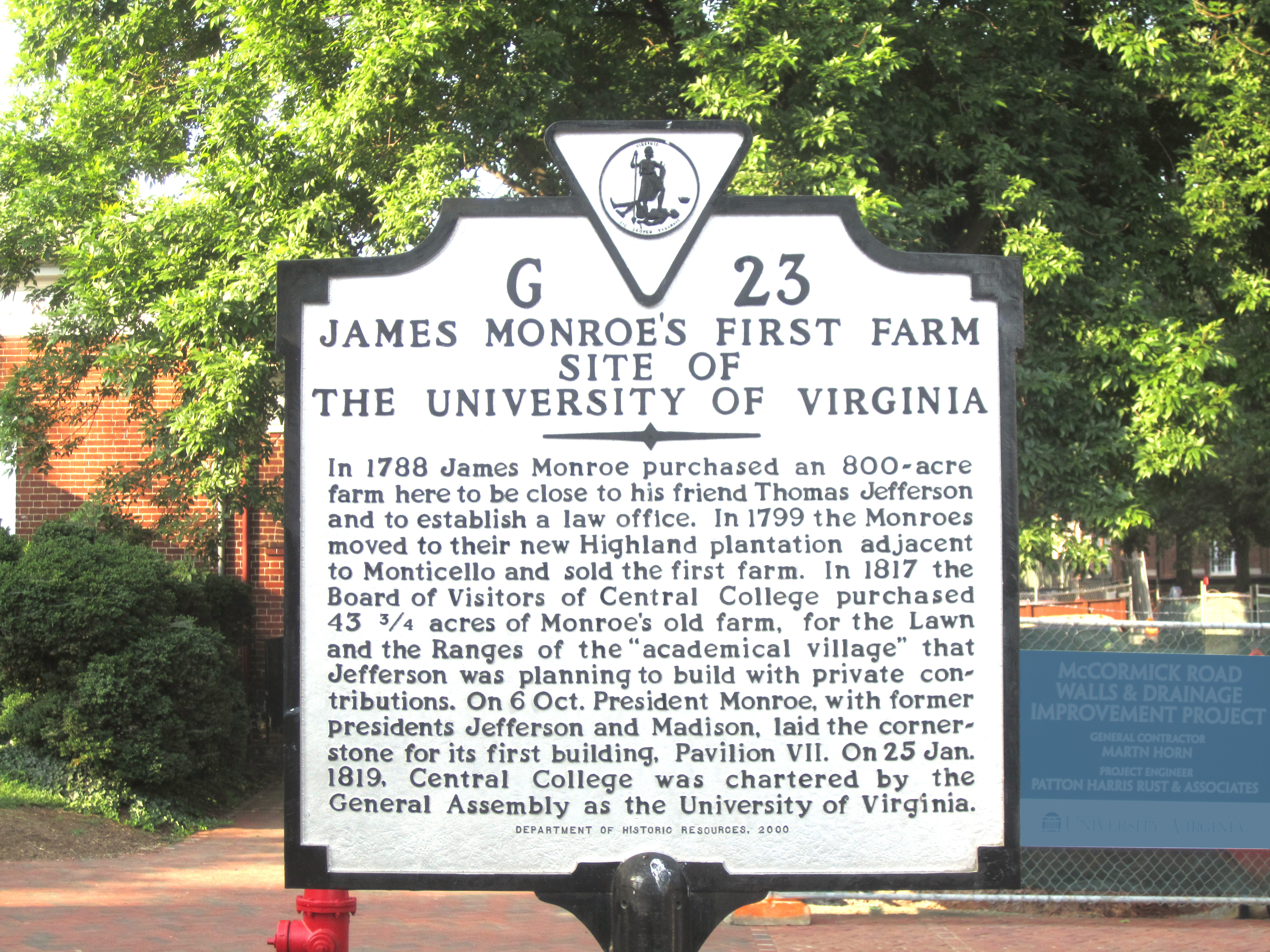
Monroe once owned a farm at the location of the University of Virginia in Charlottesville

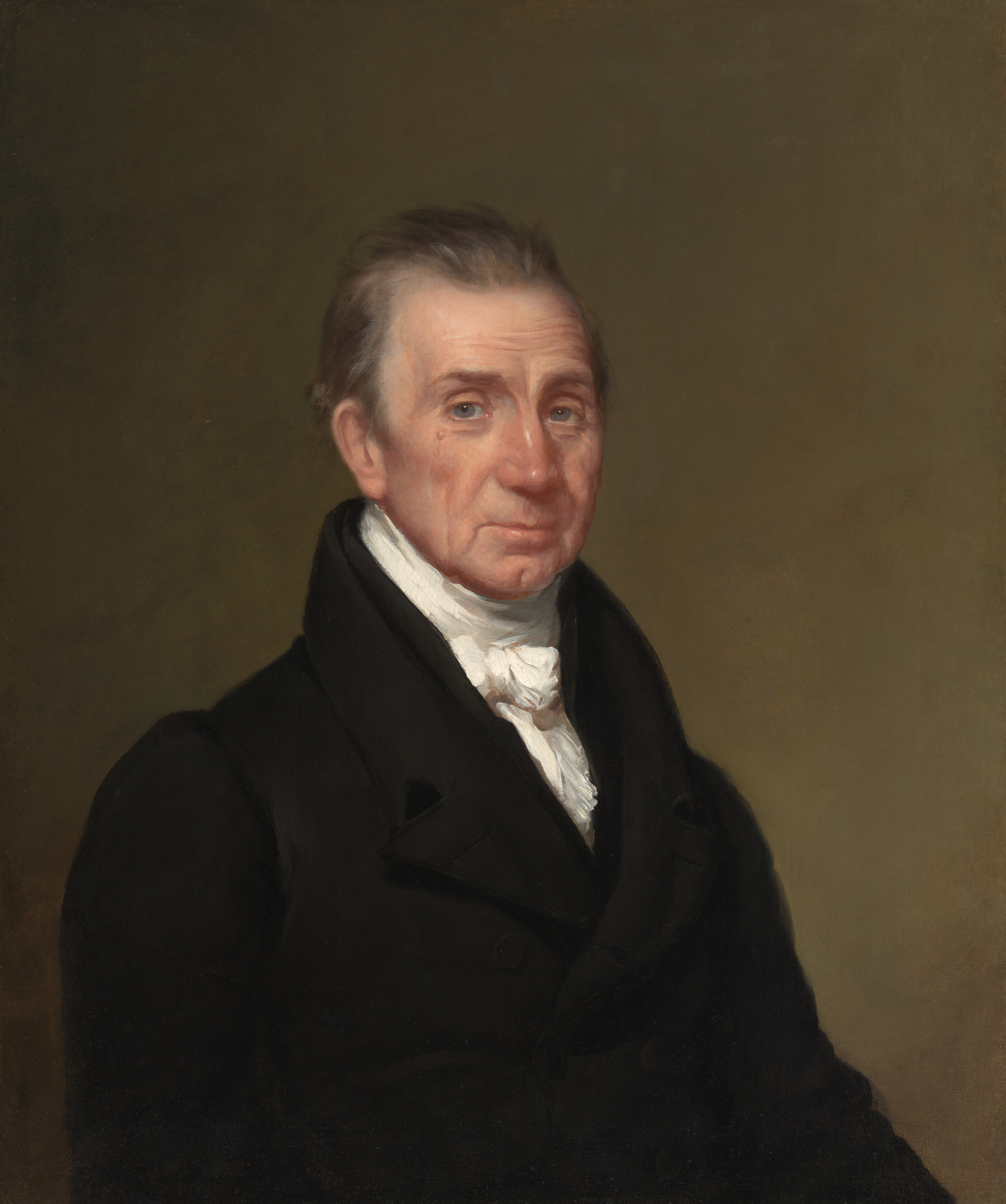
Monroe in an 1829 portrait by Chester Harding

When his presidency ended on March 4, 1825, Monroe resided at Monroe Hill, which is now included in the grounds of the University of Virginia. Monroe spent the first five years of his retirement at his Oak Hill residence in Aldie, Virginia. In August 1825, the Monroes had received the Marquis de Lafayette and President John Quincy Adams as guests there.

Monroe devoted himself to reading, with his private library containing over 3,000 books, most of which he had acquired during his stays in Europe. Monroe began work on a book of political theory The People the Sovereigns, Being a Comparison of the Government of the United States with those of the Republics Which Have Existed Before, with the Causes of their Decadence and Fall. The work was designed to highlight the difference between governments and people of the United States and other countries, ancient and modern, to show that certain issues that produced disastrous effects in them were not present in America.

In 1829, Monroe abandoned work on The People the Sovereigns after hearing George Hay's unfavorable reaction to the manuscript. Hay suggested that Monroe write an autobiography, which would be more interesting and valuable to posterity. Monroe, delighted with the idea, began working on an autobiography, but died before it could be completed.

In retirement, he was plagued by pressing financial worries. As Minister to France during the 1790s, he had had to take out substantial private loans to fulfill representative duties and diplomatic protocol due to his moderate pay. As early as 1797, he had asked Congress for an expense allowance and had been waiting in vain for a payment ever since. In the last days before handing over to Adams, Monroe wrote to Jefferson and Madison asking them to support him in his claims against Congress if necessary. He sold off his Highland Plantation to the Second Bank of the United States out of financial necessity. It is now owned by his alma mater, the College of William and Mary, which has opened it to the public as a historic site. Throughout his life, he was financially insolvent, which was exacerbated by his wife's poor health.

Monroe served on the Board of Visitors for the University of Virginia under Jefferson and the second rector, James Madison, both former presidents, nearly until his death. Monroe had previously been a member of the original board of Central College (the predecessor to the University of Virginia), however the demands of the Presidency prevented him from continuing in the role. At the annual examinations in July, he presided over the Board of Examiners. When there was considerable indiscipline among the students, Monroe suggested in a report in 1830 that military drill be added to the curriculum, but Madison refused.

=== Virginia Constitutional Convention Delegate ===
Although already clearly marked by age and severely impaired by a horse accident in 1828, Monroe was elected as a delegate to the Virginia Constitutional Convention of 1829–1830. He was one of four delegates elected from the senatorial district made up of his home district of Loudoun and Fairfax County. In October 1829, he was elected by the convention to serve as the presiding officer, until his failing health required him to withdraw on December 8, after which Philip P. Barbour of Orange County was elected presiding officer.

=== Death ===
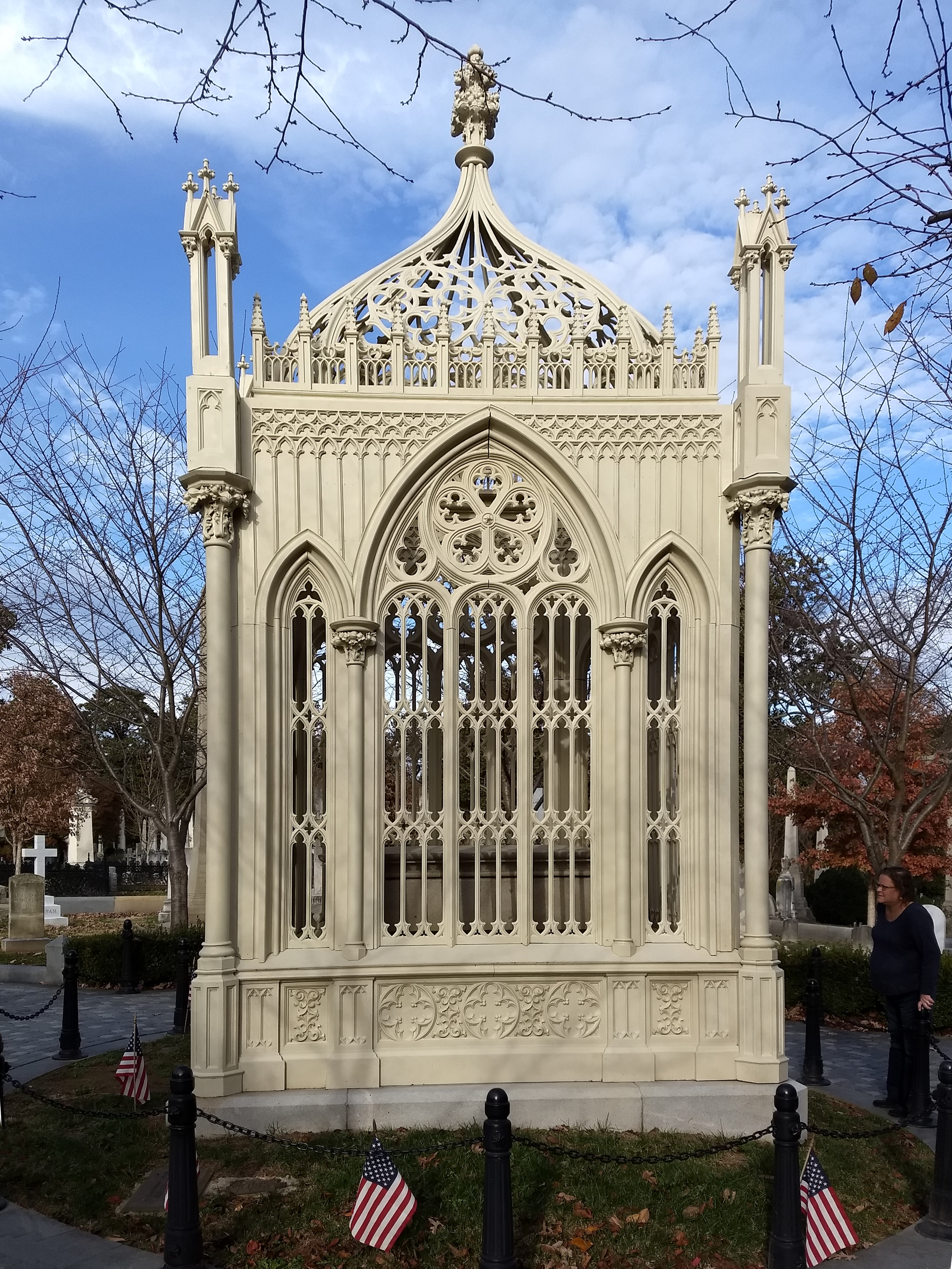
Monroe's grave at Hollywood Cemetery in Richmond, Virginia

Shortly before his death, Monroe was dealt a severe blow when his son-in-law and close advisor George Hay died on September 21, 1830, and his wife Elizabeth died just two days later. Upon Elizabeth's death in 1830, Monroe moved to 63 Prince Street at Lafayette Place in New York City to live with his daughter Maria Hester Monroe Gouverneur, who had married Samuel L. Gouverneur, son of Nicholas Gouverneur.

On July 4, 1831, Monroe died at age 73 from heart failure and tuberculosis, becoming the third president to have died on Independence Day. His death came 55 years after the United States Declaration of Independence was proclaimed and five years after the deaths of John Adams and Thomas Jefferson. Monroe was originally buried in New York at the Gouverneur family's vault in the New York City Marble Cemetery. 27 years later, in 1858, his body was re-interred at the President's Circle in Hollywood Cemetery in Richmond, Virginia. The James Monroe Tomb is a U.S. National Historic Landmark.

== Philosophy and views ==
=== Freemasonry ===
Monroe was initiated as a Freemason on November 9, 1775, in Williamsburg Lodge No. 6, Williamsburg, Virginia, at the age of 17 while he studied at the College of William & Mary. He was active as a Freemason until at least 1786.

=== Religious beliefs ===
"When it comes to Monroe's thoughts on religion," historian Bliss Isely notes, "less is known than that of any other President." No letters survive in which he discussed his religious beliefs. Nor did his friends, family or associates comment on his beliefs. Letters that do survive, such as ones written after the death of his son, contain no discussion of religion.

Monroe was raised in a family that belonged to the Church of England when it was the state church in Virginia before the Revolution. As an adult, he attended Episcopal churches. Some historians see "deistic tendencies" in his few references to an impersonal God. Unlike Jefferson, Monroe rarely faced accusations of being an atheist or infidel. In 1832, James Renwick Willson, a Reformed Presbyterian minister in Albany, New York, criticized Monroe for having "lived and died like a second-rate Athenian philosopher".

=== Slavery ===
Monroe owned dozens of slaves. He took several slaves with him to Washington to serve at the White House from 1817 to 1825. This was typical of other slaveholding presidents. Monroe sold his small Virginia plantation in 1783 to enter law and politics. Although he owned multiple properties over the course of his lifetime, his plantations were never profitable. Although he owned much more land and many more slaves, and speculated in property, he was rarely on site to oversee the operations. Overseers treated the slaves harshly to force production, but the plantations barely broke even. Monroe incurred debts by his lavish and expensive lifestyle and often sold property (including slaves) to pay them off. The labor of Monroe's many slaves was also used to support his daughter and son-in-law, along with a ne'er-do-well brother, Andrew, and his son, James.

When Monroe was Governor of Virginia in 1800, hundreds of slaves from Virginia planned to kidnap him, take Richmond, and negotiate for their freedom. Gabriel's slave conspiracy was discovered. Monroe called out the militia; the slave patrols soon captured some slaves accused of involvement. Sidbury says some trials had a few measures to prevent abuses, such as an appointed attorney, but they were "hardly 'fair'". Slave codes prevented slaves from being treated like whites, and they were given quick trials without a jury. Monroe influenced the Executive Council to pardon and sell some slaves instead of hanging them.

Historians say the Virginia courts executed between 26 and 35 slaves. None of the executed slaves had killed any whites because the uprising had been foiled before it began. An additional 50 slaves charged for their role in the planned rebellion were spared, as a result of pardons, acquittals, and commutations. One reason for this was influence of a letter Monroe received from Thomas Jefferson urging mercy, telling him "The other states & the world at large will for ever condemn us if we indulge a principle of revenge, or go one step beyond absolute necessity. They cannot lose sight of the rights of the two parties, & the object of the unsuccessful one." Only seven of the executions carried out against the rebels occurred after Monroe received Jefferson's letter.

During Monroe's Ministry to the United Kingdom, William Wilberforce, an ardent abolitionist and British MP, sent a letter to Monroe asking him to confirm or deny a rumor he had heard regarding Congress reviving the slave trade (to which Monroe's reply is now lost, but is understood to have denied any such thing happening). Following this, Monroe and Wilberforce maintained a "sporadic correspondence," with Wilberforce asking Monroe about the conditions of southern slaves and Monroe appreciating Wilberforce's writings on abolition.

During the course of his presidency, Monroe remained convinced that slavery was wrong and supported private manumission, but at the same time he insisted that any attempt to promote emancipation would cause more problems. Monroe believed that slavery had become a permanent part of southern life, and that it could only be removed on providential terms. Like so many other Upper South slaveholders, Monroe believed that a central purpose of government was to ensure "domestic tranquility" for all.

Like so many other Upper South planters, he also believed that the central purpose of government was to empower planters like himself. He feared for public safety in the United States during the era of violent revolution on two fronts. First, from potential class warfare of the French Revolution in which those of the propertied classes were summarily purged in mob violence and then preemptive trials, and second, from possible racial warfare similar to that of the Haitian Revolution in which blacks, whites, then mixed-race inhabitants were indiscriminately slaughtered as events there unfolded.

As president of Virginia's constitutional convention in the fall of 1829, Monroe reiterated his belief that slavery was a blight which, even as a British colony, Virginia had attempted to eradicate. "What was the origin of our slave population?" he rhetorically asked. "The evil commenced when we were in our Colonial state, but acts were passed by our Colonial Legislature, prohibiting the importation, of more slaves, into the Colony. These were rejected by the Crown." To the dismay of states' rights proponents, he was willing to accept the federal government's financial assistance to emancipate and transport freed slaves to other countries. At the convention, Monroe made his final public statement on slavery, proposing that Virginia emancipate and deport its bondsmen with "the aid of the Union".

Monroe was active in the American Colonization Society, which supported the establishment of colonies outside of the United States for free African Americans. The society helped send several thousand freed slaves to the new colony of Liberia in Africa from 1820 to 1840. Slave owners like Monroe and Andrew Jackson wanted to prevent free blacks from encouraging slaves in the South to rebel. Liberia's capital, Monrovia, was named after President Monroe.

== Legacy ==
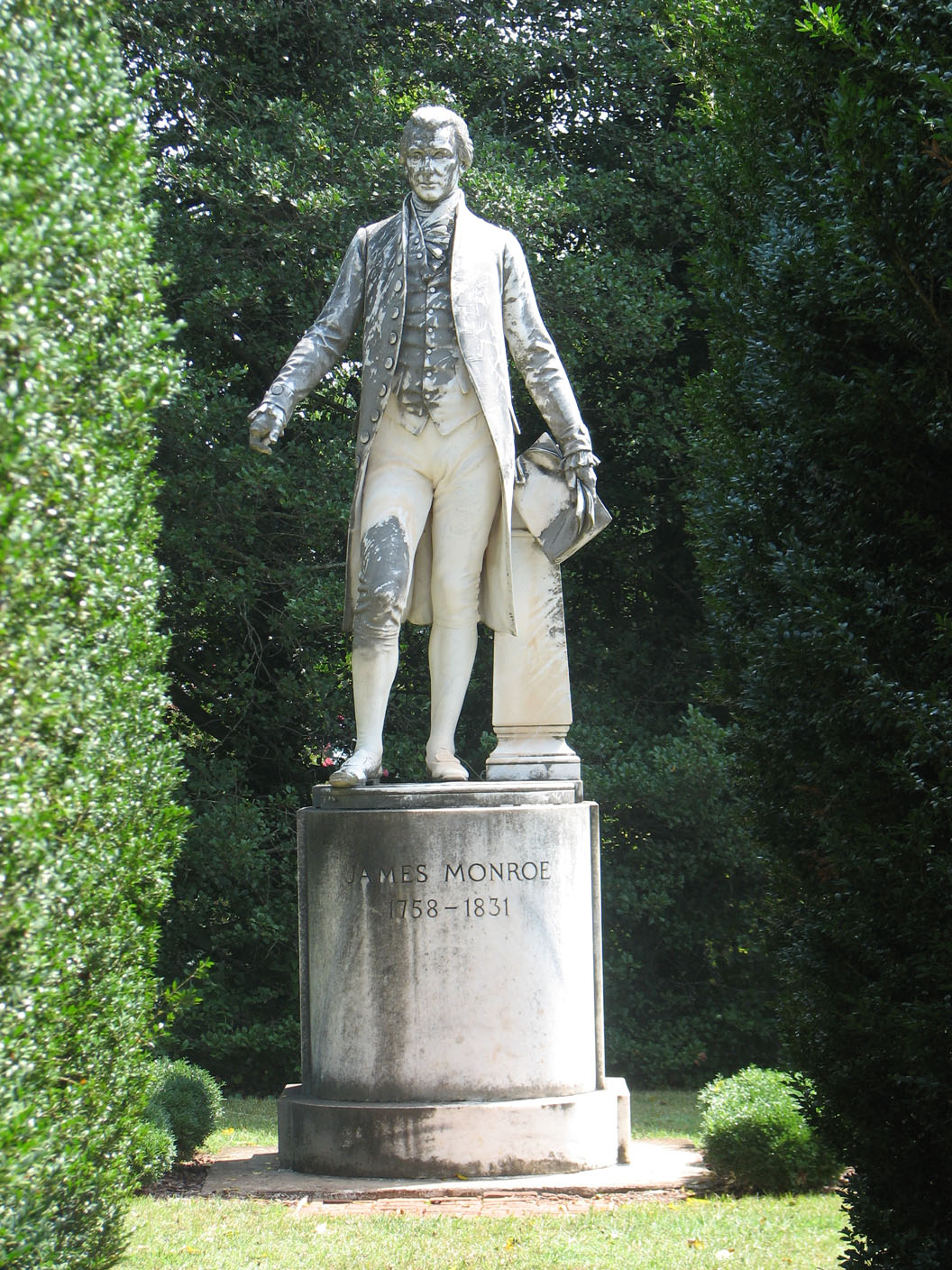
Statue of Monroe at Highland, his house near Charlottesville, Virginia

=== Historical reputation ===
Polls of historians and political scientists tend to rank Monroe as an above average president. Monroe presided over a period in which the United States began to turn away from European affairs and towards domestic issues. His presidency saw the United States settle many of its longstanding boundary issues through an accommodation with Britain and the acquisition of Florida. Monroe also helped resolve sectional tensions through his support of the Missouri Compromise and by seeking support from all regions of the country. Political scientist Fred Greenstein argues that Monroe was a more effective executive than some of his better-known predecessors, including Madison and John Adams.

=== Memorials ===
The capital of Liberia is named Monrovia after Monroe; it is the only national capital other than Washington, D.C., named after a U.S. president. Monroe is the namesake of seventeen Monroe counties. Monroe, Maine, Monroe, Michigan, Monroe, Georgia, Monroe, Connecticut, both Monroe Townships in New Jersey, and Fort Monroe are all named for him. Monroe has been depicted on U.S. currency and stamps, including a 1954 United States Postal Service 5¢ Liberty Issue postage stamp.

Monroe was the last U.S. president to wear a powdered wig tied in a queue, a tricorne hat and knee-breeches according to the style of the late 18th century. That earned him the nickname "The Last Cocked Hat". He was also the last president who was not photographed.

Monroe's participation in three historical events was memorialized. His participation in George Washington's crossing of the Delaware River in 1776 was memorialized in Emanuel Leutze's 1851 painting Washington Crossing the Delaware and his participation in the Battle of Trenton in 1776 as well as in George Washington's resignation as commander-in-chief of the Continental Army in 1783 was memorialized in John Trumbull's paintings The Capture of the Hessians at Trenton, December 26, 1776 and General George Washington Resigning His Commission respectively.

== Bibliography ==
=== Secondary sources ===
- Ammon, Harry (1971). James Monroe: The Quest for National Identity. McGraw-Hill. ISBN 9780070015821. 706 pp. standard scholarly biography
- Ammon, Harry. "James Monroe" in Henry F. Graff ed., The Presidents: A Reference History (3rd ed. 2002) online
- Cresson, William P. James Monroe (1946). 577 pp. good scholarly biography
- Cunningham, Noble E. Jr. (1996). The Presidency of James Monroe.. 246 pp. standard scholarly survey
- Dangerfield, George (1965). The Awakening of American Nationalism: 1815–1828. Harper and Rowe. ISBN 978-0-88133-823-2.
- Greenstein, Fred I. (2009). "The Political Professionalism of James Monroe". Presidential Studies Quarterly. 39 (2): 275–282. doi:10.1111/j.1741-5705.2009.03675.x. ISSN 0360-4918. JSTOR 41427360.
- Hammond, John Craig (2019). "President, Planter, Politician: James Monroe, the Missouri Crisis, and the Politics of Slavery" (PDF). Journal of American History. 105 (3): 843–67. doi:10.1093/jahist/jaz002. Archived from the original (PDF) on November 25, 2020.
- Hart, Gary (2005). James Monroe. Henry Holy and Co. ISBN 978-0-8050-6960-0. superficial, short, popular biography
- Haworth, Peter Daniel. "James Madison and James Monroe Historiography: A Tale of Two Divergent Bodies of Scholarship." in A Companion to James Madison and James Monroe (2013): 521–539.
- Howe, Daniel Walker (2007). What Hath God Wrought: The Transformation of America, 1815–1848. Oxford Univ. Press. ISBN 978-0-19-507894-7. Pulitzer Prize; a sweeping interpretation of the era
- Holmes, David L. The Faiths of the Founding Fathers, May 2006, online version Archived October 24, 2013, at the Wayback Machine
- Johnson, Allen (1915). Union and Democracy. Boston: Houghton Mifflin Company.
- Leibiger, Stuart, ed. A Companion to James Madison and James Monroe (2012) excerpt; emphasis on historiography
- May, Ernest R. The Making of the Monroe Doctrine (1975).
- McGrath, Tim (2021). James Monroe: A Life. Penguin Random House. ISBN 9780451477279.
- Perkins, Dexter. The Monroe Doctrine, 1823–1826 (1927).
- Poston, Brook. James Monroe: A Republican Champion. Gainesville, FL: University Press of Florida, 2019.
- Pulliam, David Loyd (1901). The Constitutional Conventions of Virginia from the foundation of the Commonwealth to the present time. John T. West, Richmond. ISBN 978-1-2879-2059-5.
- Renehan Edward J., Jr. The Monroe Doctrine: The Cornerstone of American Foreign Policy (2007)
- Scherr, Arthur. "James Monroe and John Adams: An Unlikely 'Friendship'". The Historian 67#3 (2005) pp 405+. online edition Archived June 23, 2011, at the Wayback Machine
- Scherr, Arthur. "James Monroe on the Presidency and 'Foreign Influence: from the Virginia Ratifying Convention (1788) to Jefferson's Election (1801)." Mid-America 2002 84(1–3): 145–206. ISSN 0026-2927.
- Scherr, Arthur. "Governor James Monroe and the Southampton Slave Resistance of 1799." Historian 1999 61(3): 557–578. ISSN 0018-2370 Fulltext online in SwetsWise and Ebsco.
- Unger, Harlow G. (2009). The Last Founding Father: James Monroe and a Nation's Call to Greatness. Da Capo Press. Archived from the original on March 6, 2016., scholarly biography.
- Weeks, William Earl (1992). John Quincy Adams and American Global Empire. Lexington, KY: University of Kentucky Press. ISBN 978-0-8131-1779-9.
- Wilentz, Sean (2004). "Jeffersonian Democracy and the Origins of Political Antislavery in the United States: The Missouri Crisis Revisited". The Journal of the Historical Society. 4 (3): 375–401. doi:10.1111/j.1529-921X.2004.00105.x.
- Wood, Gordon S. Empire of Liberty: A history of the Early Republic, 1789–1815 (2009)

=== Primary sources ===
- Preston, Daniel, ed. The Papers of James Monroe: Selected Correspondence and Papers (6 vol, 2006 to 2017), the major scholarly edition; in progress, with coverage to 1814.
- Writings of James Monroe, edited by Stanislaus Murray Hamilton, ed., 7 vols. (1898–1903) online edition at Internet Archive

U.S. Senate
Preceded by John Walker	United States Senator (Class 1) from Virginia; 1790–1794; Served alongside: Richard Lee, John Taylor	Succeeded by Stevens T. Mason
Honorary titles
Preceded by Rufus King	Baby of the Senate; 1790–1791	Succeeded by John Rutherfurd
Diplomatic posts
Preceded by Gouverneur Morris	United States Minister to France; 1794–1796	Succeeded by Charles Pinckney
Preceded by Rufus King	United States Minister to the United Kingdom; 1803–1807	Succeeded by William Pinkney
Party political offices
Preceded by James Wood	Democratic-Republican nominee for Governor of Virginia; 1799	Succeeded by William H. Cabell
Preceded by John Tyler	Democratic-Republican nominee for Governor of Virginia; 1811	Succeeded by James Barbour
Preceded by James Madison	Democratic-Republican nominee for President of the United States; 1816, 1820	Succeeded by John Quincy Adams; Henry Clay; William H. Crawford; Andrew Jackson¹
Political offices
Preceded by James Wood	Governor of Virginia; 1799–1802	Succeeded by John Page
Preceded by George Smith; Acting	Governor of Virginia; 1811	Succeeded by George Smith
Preceded by Robert Smith	United States Secretary of State; 1811–1817	Succeeded by John Quincy Adams
Preceded by John Armstrong Jr.	United States Secretary of War; 1814–1815	Succeeded by Alexander Dallas; Acting
Preceded by James Madison	President of the United States; 1817–1825	Succeeded by John Quincy Adams
Notes and references
1. The Democratic-Republican Party split in the 1824 election, fielding four separate candidates.
