= James Monroe Birthplace Park & Museum =

Archaeological site in Virginia, United States

- James Monroe Family Home Site
- U.S. National Register of Historic Places
- Virginia Landmarks Register
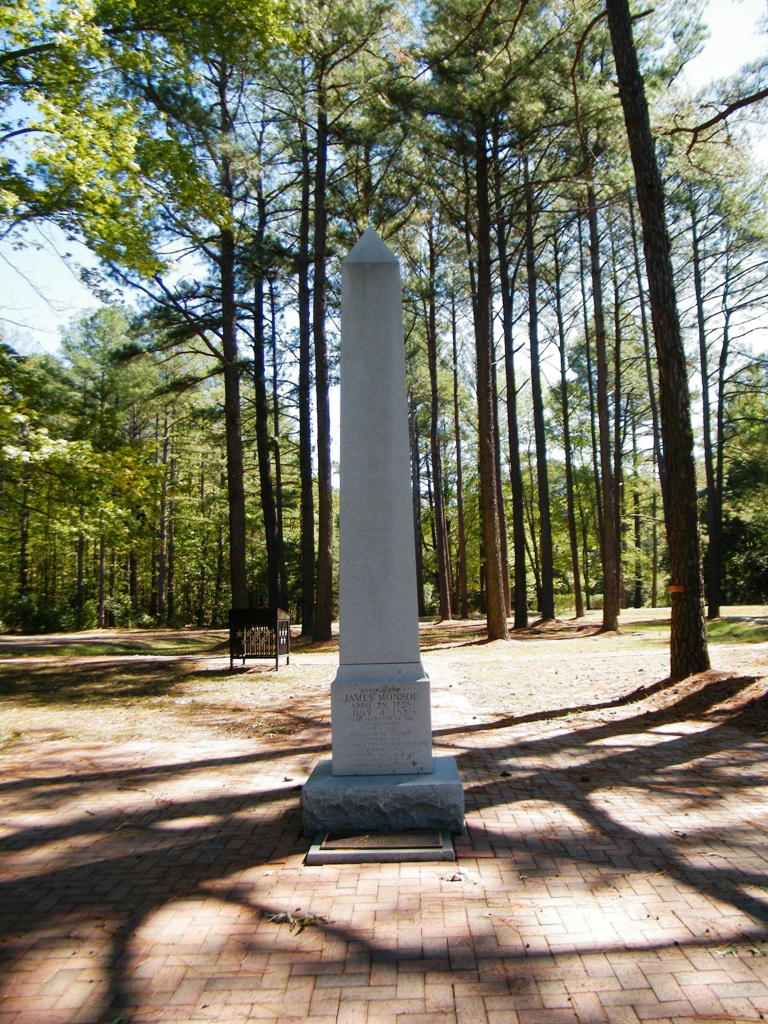
- Obelisk at the James Monroe Family Home Site, October 2010

- Location within Virginia Location within the United States
- Location: 4460 James Monroe Highway, Colonial Beach, Virginia
- Coordinates: 38°14′31″N 76°59′27″W
- Area: 74.8 acres (30.3 ha)
- Built: 1758
- Built by: Grigg, Milton
- Architectural style: Beaux Arts
- NRHP reference No.: 79003095, 08000285 (Boundary Increase)
- VLR No.: 096-0046

Significant dates
- Added to NRHP: July 24, 1979, April 10, 2008 (Boundary Increase)
- Designated VLR: December 21, 1976, December 5, 2007

James Monroe Birthplace Park & Museum, also known as James Monroe's Birthplace & Boyhood Home, is a historic archaeological site located near Monroe Hall and Colonial Beach, Westmoreland County, Virginia. The site includes the ruins and a restoration of the Monroe Family Home and birthplace of U.S. Founding Father and President James Monroe, which were uncovered in 1976 by a team from the College of William & Mary. Monroe spent his entire youth working the farm until he left for his education at William & Mary, following which he served in the Continental Army. The archaeological team uncovered a house foundation measuring 20 feet by 58 feet. The known 1845 etchings of the birth home indicate a small four room, rough cut wooden farm house with few outbuildings on a 500-acre farm filled with wetlands.

As the James Monroe Family Home Site, it was listed on the National Register of Historic Places in 1979, with a boundary increase in 2008. Construction started in 2017 to restore Monroe’s home and to create a walking path that highlights James Monroe's accomplishments; construction was projected to take two years, but ultimately lasted until 2021.

== Museum ==
Opened on October 2, 2021, the museum features a visitor center and a restoration of Monroe's birthplace. The 74-acre Birthplace Park also holds a nature trail, service road, water access from Monroe Creek and a Commemorative Timeline Walking Trail. While the park is open every day during daylight hours, it is regularly open for tours from April 28th until the end of October from 11:00 AM to 4:00 PM.
