= Monroe Hall, Virginia =

Unincorporated community in Virginia, United States

Coordinates: 38°14′23″N 76°59′32″W

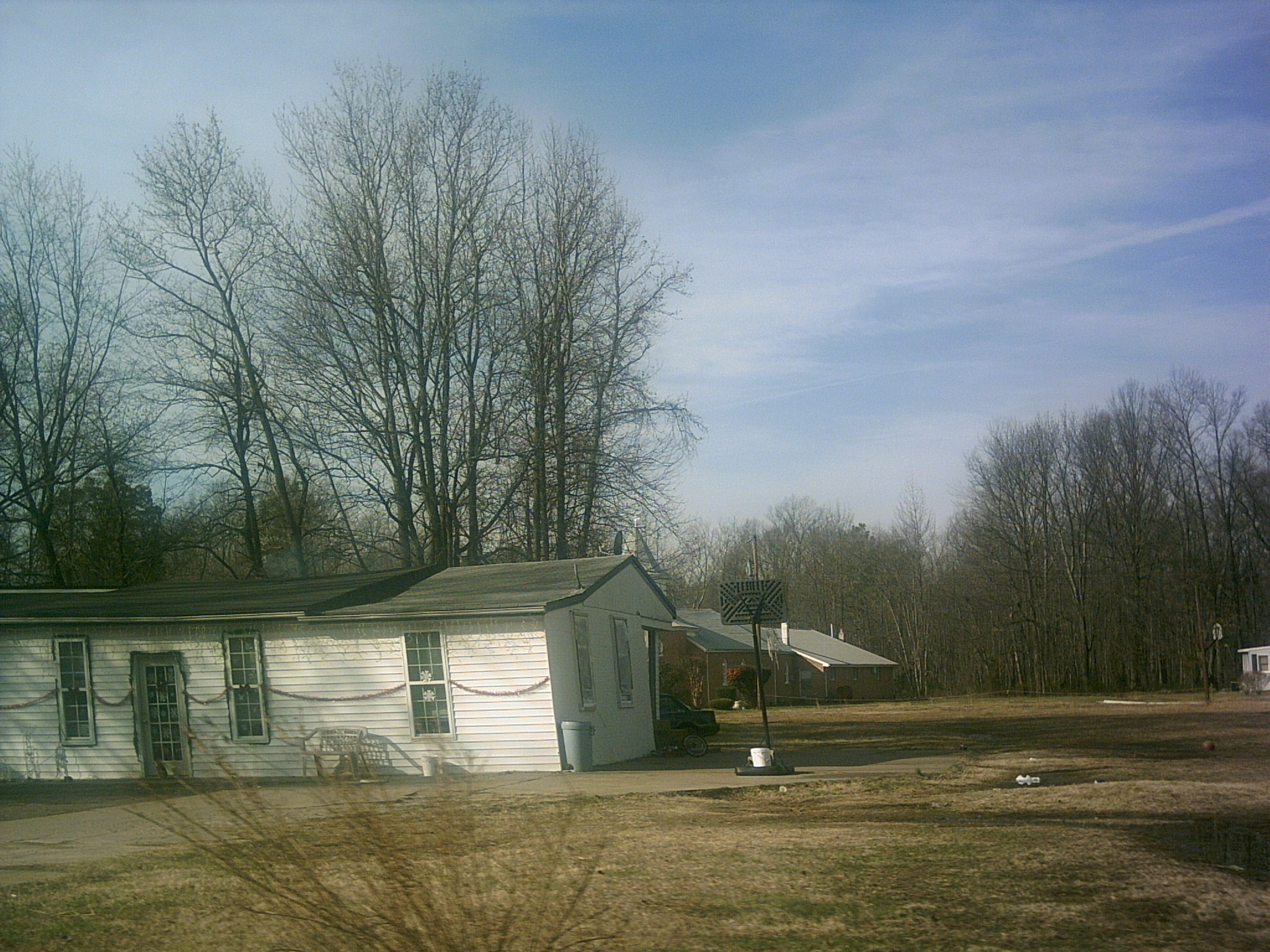
Roadside scene in Monroe Hall

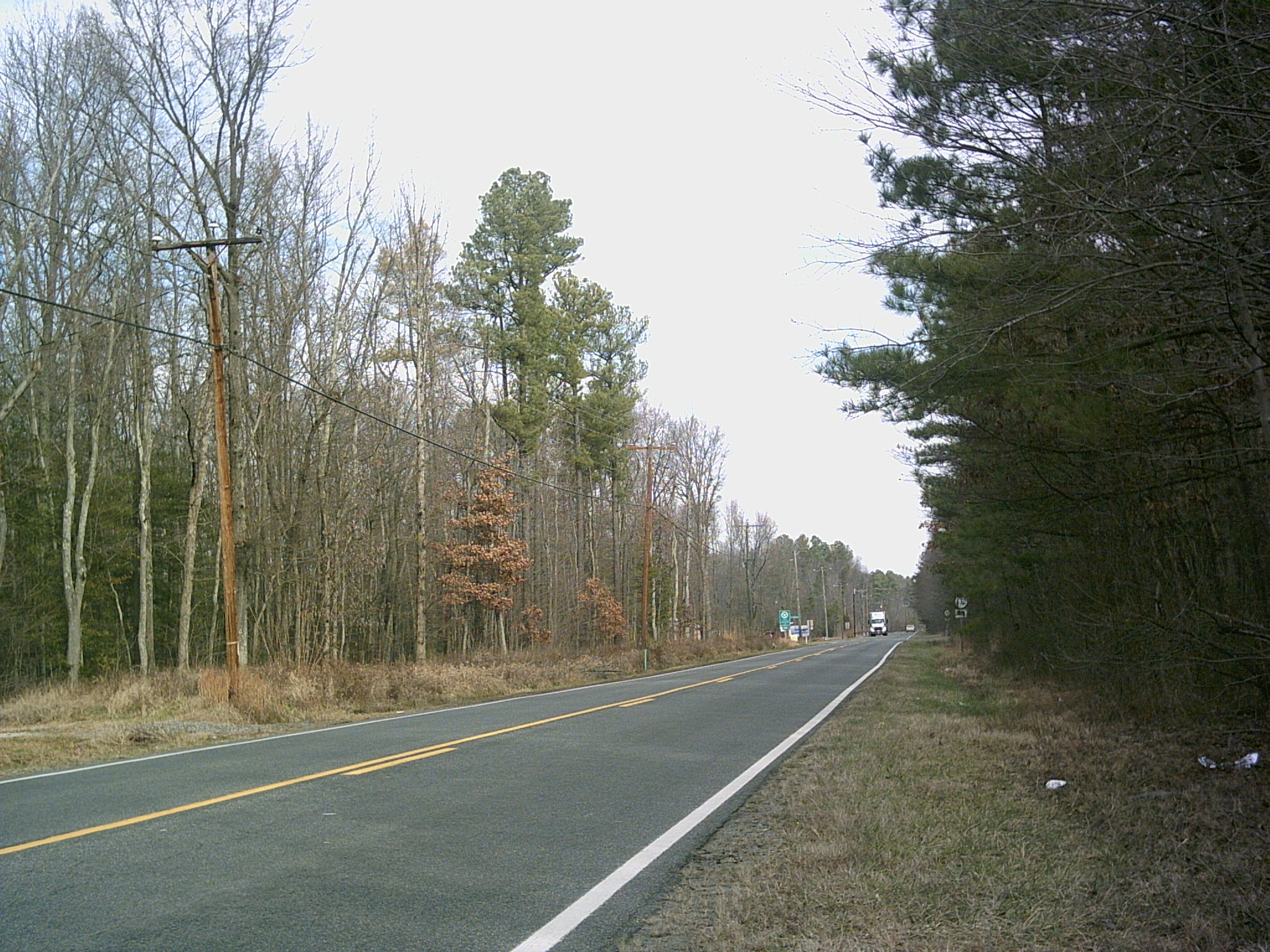
Highway running through Monroe Hall

Monroe Hall is an unincorporated community in Westmoreland County, Virginia, United States. The site of James Monroe's birthplace is located in the community, and is marked with an obelisk, a historical marker, and a bronze plaque.
