= U.S. Route 301 in Virginia =

Segment of American highway

U.S. Route 301
- US 301 highlighted in red

Route information
- Auxiliary route of US 1
- Maintained by VDOT
- Length: 142.70 mi (229.65 km)
- Existed: 1932 (1918 as SR 24, 1926 as US 17-1)–present

Major junctions
- South end: US 301 at the North Carolina border near Skippers
- US 58 in Emporia; I-95 / US 460 in Petersburg; US 1 in Petersburg; US 360 in Richmond; US 60 in Richmond; US 250 in Richmond; I-64 / I-95 in Richmond; I-295 near Chamberlayne; US 17 in Port Royal
- North end: US 301 at the Maryland border in Dahlgren

Location
- Country: United States
- State: Virginia
- Counties: Greensville, City of Emporia, Sussex, Prince George, City of Petersburg, City of Colonial Heights, Chesterfield, City of Richmond, Henrico, Hanover, Caroline, King George

Highway system
- United States Numbered Highway System; List; Special; Divided; Virginia Routes; Interstate; US; Primary; Secondary; Byways; History; HOT lanes
← SR 300	→ SR 302

U.S. Route 301 (US 301) is a part of the U.S. Highway System that runs from Sarasota, Florida, to Biddles Corner, Delaware. In Virginia, the U.S. Highway runs 142.70 miles (229.65 km) from the North Carolina state line near Skippers north to the Maryland state line at the Potomac River near Dahlgren. US 301 forms the local complement to Interstate 95 (I-95) from Emporia to Petersburg. The U.S. Highway runs concurrently with US 1 between Petersburg and the state capital of Richmond, where the highways form one of the main north–south avenues. US 301 continues north concurrent with Virginia State Route 2 (SR 2) to Bowling Green, forming an eastern alternative to I-95 and US 1 north of Richmond. At Bowling Green, which is connected to I-95 by SR 207, US 301 becomes the primary highway connecting Richmond and the Northern Neck with Southern Maryland. US 301 was constructed in four main segments: as the original SR 24 and then US 17-1 south of Petersburg, as US 1 from Petersburg to Richmond, as SR 2 from Richmond to Bowling Green, and as part of SR 207 toward Dahlgren. US 301 replaced US 17–1 in the early 1930s and was extended from Petersburg north along its current course into Maryland when the Potomac River Bridge was completed in 1940.

== Route description ==
=== North Carolina to Petersburg ===
US 301 enters Greensville County, Virginia from North Carolina as two-lane Skippers Road, which closely parallels CSX's North End Subdivision rail line, crosses Fontaine Creek, and passes through the hamlet of Skippers. The U.S. Highway temporarily expands to a four-lane divided highway through its trumpet interchange with I-95 before becoming two lanes again as it enters the independent city of Emporia as Main Street. US 301 passes through downtown Emporia, crosses the Meherrin River, passing three Virginia Historical Markers in one block facing northbound traffic between Virginia Avenue and Valley Street, and has a grade crossing of Norfolk Southern Railway's Franklin District immediately to the south of its intersection with US 58 Business (Atlantic Street). The U.S. Highway expands to a four-lane undivided highway and has a partial cloverleaf interchange with US 58 before re-entering Greensville County as four-lane divided Sussex Drive. Northbound US 301 receives a ramp from northbound I-95 a short distance south of I-95's diamond interchange with SR 614 (Otterdam Road) just west of the US 301–SR 614 intersection.

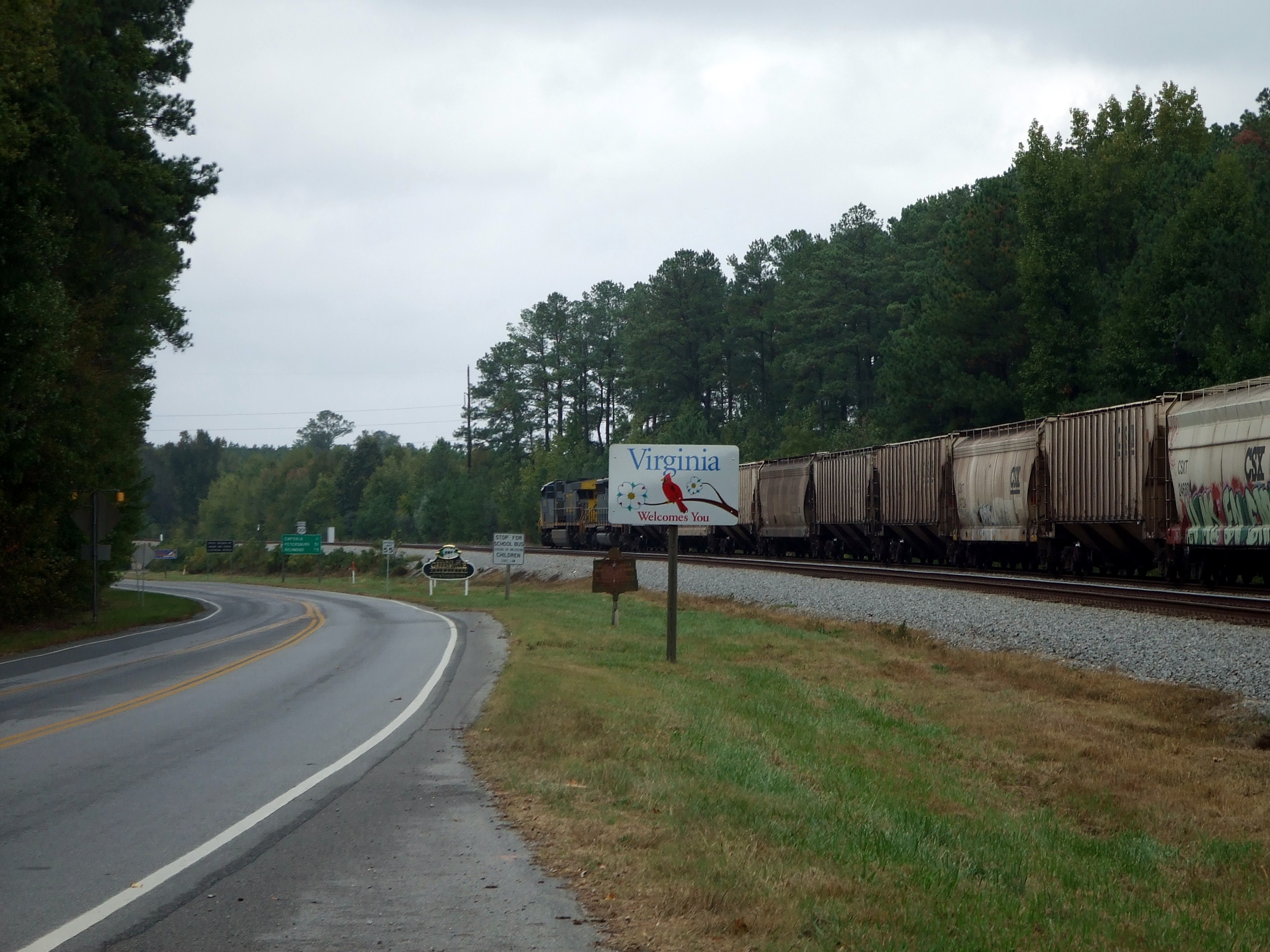
US 301 entering from North Carolina

US 301 crosses over to the east side of the CSX rail line and enters Sussex County, where the highway's name changes to Blue Star Highway. The U.S. Highway has a diamond interchange with I-95 where the Interstate crosses to the east side of the highway. US 301 meets the eastern end of SR 139 (Jarratt Avenue) while passing through the town of Jarratt. North of Jarratt, the U.S. Highway reduces to two lanes and begins to closely parallel the southbound lanes of I-95, with temporary diversions from the Interstate where secondary highways cross or have interchanges with the Interstate. The I-95 southbound lanes in this section were originally built as the northbound US 301 lanes, with the original southbound lanes being restriped for two-way traffic after the construction of I-95. US 301 crosses the Nottoway River before reaching Stony Creek, where the namesake creek enters the Nottoway River. At Stony Creek, the U.S. Highway has a junction with SR 40 (Sussex Drive) and a short concurrency with SR 40 Business, which turns west to pass through the town as Lee Avenue.

South of Carson, US 301 enters Prince George County and its name changes to Crater Road. The U.S. Highway continues to closely parallel I-95 to Templeton, where the highway has a short concurrency with SR 35 (Courtland Road), during which the highways cross to the east side of I-95 and have an interchange with the Interstate. US 301 turns north from SR 35 at the same intersection that receives a ramp from northbound I-95 and serves as the southern terminus of SR 156. US 301 and SR 156 have a short concurrency before SR 156 leaves as Prince George Drive toward Hopewell. The U.S. Highway crosses Warwick Swamp and has another interchange with I-95 in Kingwood, swapping to the west side of the Interstate. US 301 enters the city of Petersburg and expands to a four-lane divided highway just south of Wagner Road. The U.S. Highway crosses over Norfolk Southern's Norfolk District rail line in the Walnut Hill neighborhood of Petersburg, where the highway meets the southern end of US 301 Alternate (Sycamore Street).

US 301 has another interchange with I-95 between I-95's junctions with I-85 and US 460, which runs concurrently with I-85 and I-95 through Petersburg. US 301 becomes concurrent with US 460 Business at the interchange that is next to the site of the Battle of the Crater. East of Old Towne Petersburg, US 301 has intersections with Wythe Street and Washington Street, which form an east–west one-way pair that US 460 Business follows through the downtown area. Wythe Street also carries eastbound SR 36; westbound SR 36 follows Washington Street to Crater Road, where US 301 and westbound SR 36 begin to run concurrently. US 301 has its own east–west one-way pair through Old Towne Petersburg: southbound US 301 follows Bank Street and northbound US 301 follows Bollingbrook Street with westbound SR 36. The one-way pair continues west to 2nd Street, where US 301 receives the northern end of its alternate route, SR 36 continues west along Bollingbrook Street, and US 301 joins US 1 on 2nd Street to leave Petersburg by crossing the Martin Luther King Jr. Memorial Bridge over the Appomattox River.

=== Petersburg to Richmond ===
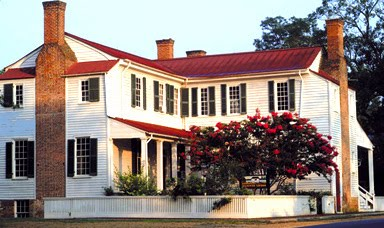
Hanover Tavern as viewed from the green in front of the Hanover County Courthouse

US 301 and US 1 pass through the city of Colonial Heights as Boulevard, a five-lane road with center turn lane. The U.S. Highways are joined by SR 144 (Temple Avenue) south of the highways' crossing of CSX's North End Subdivision. The three highways cross Swift Creek into Chesterfield County, where SR 144 splits northwest as Harrowgate Road and the U.S. Highways continue along four-lane undivided Jefferson Davis Highway. US 301 and US 1 pass under the railroad again south of Chester, where the highway passes the main campus of Brightpoint Community College and intersects SR 10 (West Hundred Road). North of Chester, the U.S. Highways have a cloverleaf interchange with SR 288. US 301 and US 1 continue as a divided highway through the industrial community of Bellwood, where the highways cross over CSX's Bellwood Subdivision and pass to the east of Defense Supply Center, Richmond. The highway expands to six lanes just north of its crossing of Falling Creek near the site of the Falling Creek Ironworks and Ampthill plantation and just south of its cloverleaf interchange with SR 150 (Chippenham Parkway).

US 301 and US 1 pass through the community of Bensley before entering the city of Richmond near Walmsley Boulevard. The U.S. Highways intersect SR 161 (Bells Road), which leads to the Port of Richmond on the James River. North of the Model Tobacco Factory complex, US 301 and US 1 enter the Manchester section of Richmond. The highway's name changes to Cowardin Avenue at its intersection with US 360 (Hull Street). North of US 60 (Semmes Avenue), US 301 and US 1 have a partial interchange with Riverside Drive, allowing access to and from the north, and cross the James River and Belle Isle on the Robert E. Lee Memorial Bridge. The bridge crosses over CSX's Rivanna Subdivision before reaching a partial interchange with 2nd Street, allowing access to and from the south, at its northern end, west of the Tredegar Iron Works. US 301 and US 1 follow Belvidere Street through the Oregon Hill neighborhood of Richmond, which lies to the east of Hollywood Cemetery, site of the James Monroe Tomb.

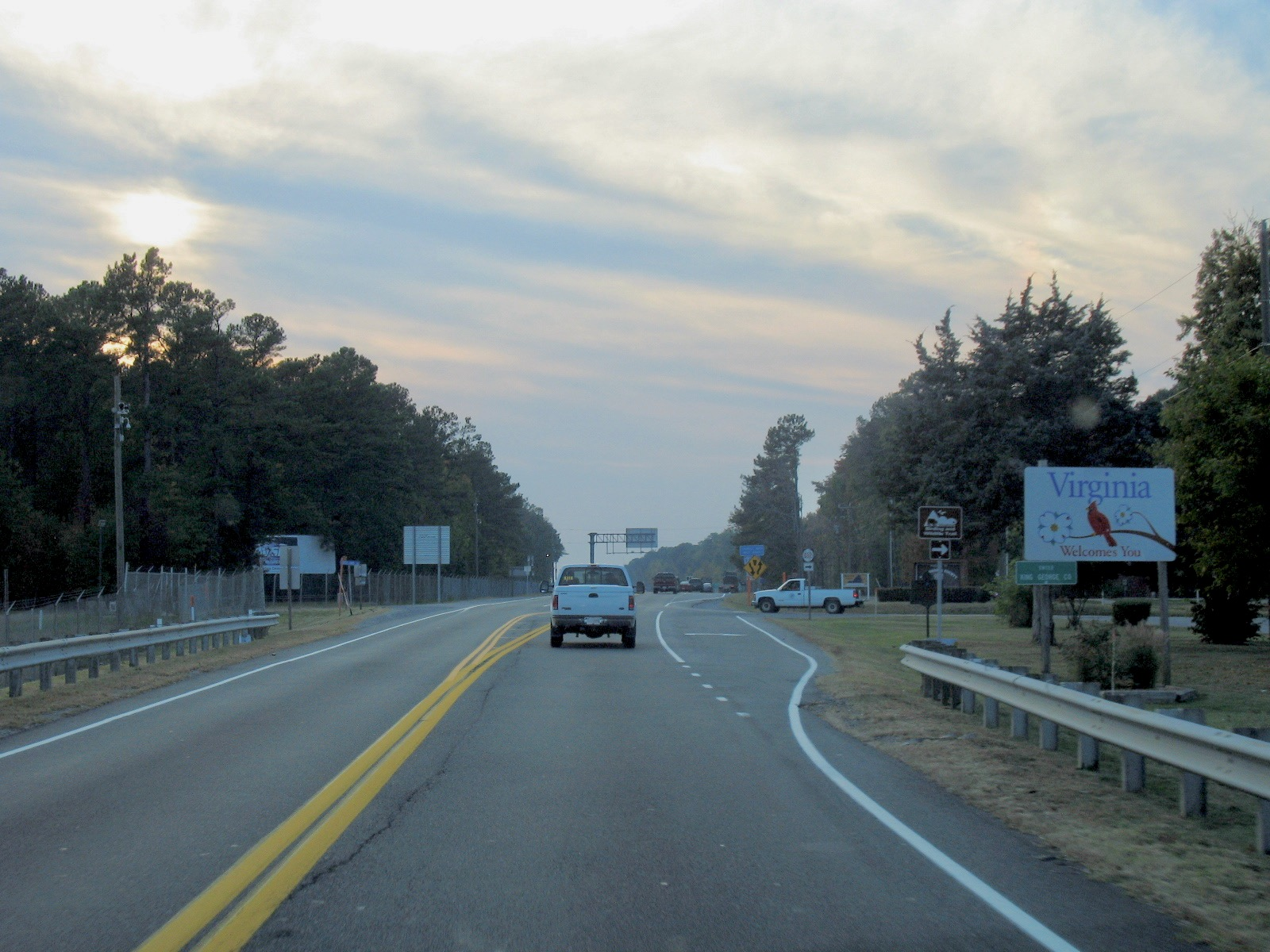
US 301 entering from Maryland

After crossing SR 195 (Downtown Expressway), which is indirectly accessed via Byrd Street and Cumberland Street, US 301 and US 1 pass between the eastern edge of the Virginia Commonwealth University campus and the western edge of Downtown Richmond. There, the U.S. Highways intersect SR 147, which follows Cary Street eastbound and Main Street westbound. US 301 and US 1 curve northeast between Monroe Park and The Commonwealth Club and intersect US 250 (Broad Street). North of its interchange with I-64 and I-95, the U.S. Highways curve north, cross CSX's Richmond Terminal Subdivision. and continue along four-lane Chamberlayne Avenue. US 301 and US 1 meet the northern end of SR 197 at Laburnum Avenue on their way to the northern edge of Richmond. At Azalea Avenue, US 1 and US 301 diverge; US 1 turns west onto Azalea Avenue and then north onto Brook Road while US 301 continues north on Chamberlayne Avenue concurrent with SR 2, which has its southern terminus at the intersection.

=== Richmond to Potomac River ===
US 301 and SR 2 exit the city of Richmond and enter Henrico County. A short distance north of the city limits, the carriageways split, with the southbound lanes crossing to the west of I-95. Several ramps connect the two highways with I-95 in the forested area around Upham Brook. After I-95 veers northwest and the carriageways rejoin, US 301 and SR 2 pass through the suburb of Chamberlayne. The highways meet the eastern end of Parham Road, the main east–west boulevard of Henrico County, just before crossing the Chickahominy River into Hanover County. US 301 and SR 2 meet I-295 at a cloverleaf interchange just north of the county line. The two highways continue through a suburban area where they pass under CSX's Piedmont Subdivision. North of Hanover High School, US 301 and SR 2 reduce to two lanes and the road's name changes to Hanover Courthouse Road. At Hanover Courthouse, the highway meets the eastern end of SR 54 (Patrick Henry Road). US 301 and SR 2 also pass the 18th century Hanover County Courthouse, where Patrick Henry argued the case of the Parson's Cause, and the Hanover Tavern, where the Barksdale Theater opened the first dinner theater in the United States in 1953.

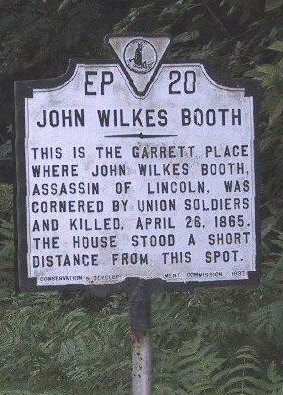
Historical marker near Port Royal

US 301 and SR 2 cross the Pamunkey River into Caroline County. The road, now named Richmond Turnpike, intersects SR 30 (Dawn Boulevard) in the hamlet of Bowersville, also known as Dawn. The two highways run straight for 13 miles (21 km); near the north end of the straight, the highways cross the Mattaponi River. At the north end of the straight, SR 2 and US 301 expand to a four-lane divided highway that lasts until the two highways pass under SR 207 (Bowling Green Bypass). SR 2 and US 301 Business continue straight into the town of Bowling Green as Main Street while US 301 turns onto a two-lane ramp that leads to the Bowling Green Bypass. US 301 joins the four-lane divided bypass at SR 207's eastern terminus. After passing around the east side of the town of Bowling Green, the U.S. Highway receives the northern end of its business route, Broaddus Avenue.

US 301 continues northeast as A.P. Hill Boulevard, which enters the eponymous military installation. East of the U.S. Army base's main entrance, the U.S. Highway passes through the forested Army reservation for 9 miles (14 km) without an intersection. Near the eastern edge of Fort A.P. Hill, US 301 passes the site of the Garrett farmhouse and barn where John Wilkes Booth was killed by federal troops 12 days after he had assassinated Abraham Lincoln. At the eastern edge of the military base, the highway intersects US 17 (Tidewater Trail). US 301 becomes an undivided highway as it passes through the town of Port Royal as Main Street, then uses the James Madison Memorial Bridge to cross the Rappahannock River into King George County.

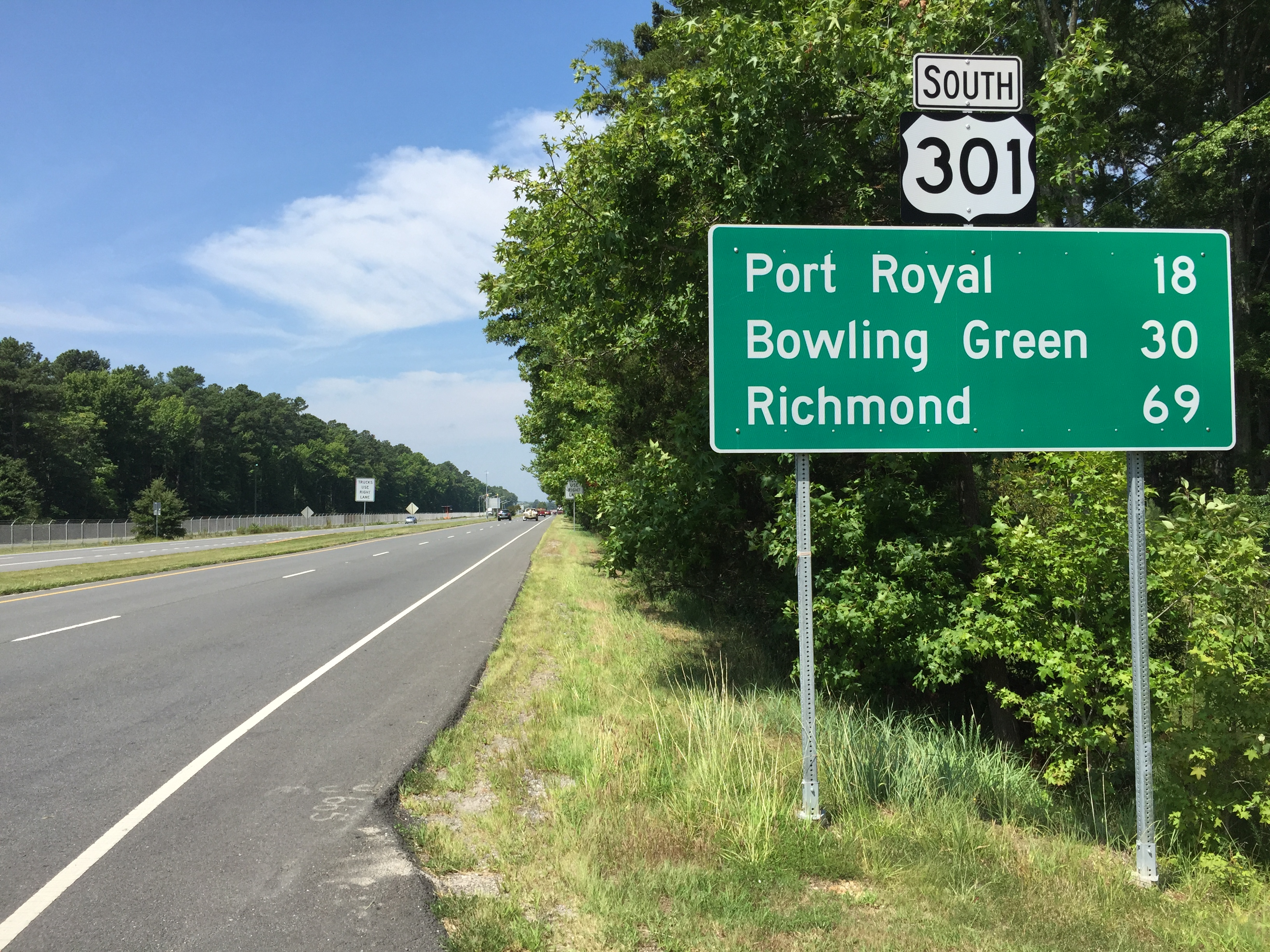
View south along US 301 in King George County just after crossing the Nice Bridge from Maryland

US 301 continues north as James Madison Parkway and passes Emmanuel Episcopal Church and Belle Grove, the birthplace of James Madison, in the hamlet of Port Conway on the north side of the river. The U.S. Highway intersects SR 3 (Kings Highway) at Office Hall and SR 205 (Ridge Road) at Edgehill. Both highways connect US 301 with King George, the county seat of King George County. US 301 continues northeast to Owens, where the highway has intersections with SR 218 (Windsor Drive) and SR 206 (Dahlgren Road). SR 206 leads to the community of Dahlgren, which is home to the Dahlgren Division of the Naval Surface Warfare Center. US 301 parallels the northern perimeter of the naval reservation on its way to the Potomac River. The U.S. Highway uses the Harry W. Nice Memorial Bridge to cross the Potomac River into Maryland.

== History ==
US 301 south of Petersburg was part of the U.S. Highway System from its beginning in 1926, though it was part of U.S. Route 17-1 until 1932. The extension north from Petersburg was added in late 1940, when the Potomac River Bridge opened. Prior to 1933, the road from Petersburg south into North Carolina was State Route 24. The initial SR 24 was a short route from Emporia southwest to North Carolina along current State Route 627 (via Brink and Barley). It connected at the state line to North Carolina Highway 40.

The "Halifax Road" from North Carolina via Emporia to the junction with State Route 35 (then State Route 5) south of Petersburg was not assigned as part of the initial state highway system in 1918. In March 1923, a delegation from Petersburg appeared before the State Highway Commission, requesting that this be added to the system. They claimed that the road was to be included in the system, but it was left out through an error. SR 24 south of Emporia was realigned in April 1924 to the present US 301 alignment, and North Carolina Highway 40 was realigned at around the same time to match. Over the next several years, the Halifax Road from Emporia to SR 35 was added to the state highway system as SR 24. By 1927, Route 24 had replaced Route 35 north of their junction to Petersburg, and was completely concurrent with U.S. Route 17-1. The number was decommissioned in the 1933 renumbering, at which time the present State Route 24 was designated.

== Major intersections ==
County	Location	mi	km	Destinations	Notes
Greensville		0.00	0.00	US 301 south – Weldon	Southern terminus of US 301 in Virginia; North Carolina state line
Greensville	Skippers			SR 629 (Moores Ferry Road / Zion Church Road) to I-95	
Greensville		8.71	14.02	I-95 – Rocky Mount, NC, Petersburg	I-95 exit 8
City of Emporia				Laurel Street	former SR 88 east
City of Emporia		10.84	17.45	US 58 Bus. (Atlantic Street) to I-95	former SR 88 west
City of Emporia		11.58	18.64	US 58 to I-95 – South Hill, Petersburg, Norfolk, Virginia Beach	interchange
Greensville				SR 614 (Otterdam Road) to I-95	single direct ramp (exit 12) from I-95 north to US 301 north; other movements are made via SR 614 (exit 13)
Sussex				I-95 – Rocky Mount, NC, Richmond	I-95 exit 17
Sussex	Jarratt	20.07	32.30	SR 139 west (Jarratt Avenue) / SR 631 to I-95 – Jarratt Business District	former SR 137
Sussex	Stony Creek	30.77	49.52	SR 40 (Sussex Drive) to I-95 – Stony Creek	South end of concurrency with SR 40 Business
Sussex	Stony Creek	30.99	49.87	SR 40 Bus. west (Lee Avenue)	North end of concurrency with SR 40 Business
Sussex				SR 602 (Saint Johns Church Road / Cabin Point Road) to I-95	
Prince George	Carson			I-95 / SR 604 (Halifax Road) / SR 623 (Rowarty Road) – Carson, Dinwiddie, Petersburg, Emporia	I-95 exit 37; former SR 141 west
Prince George	Templeton	41.06	66.08	SR 35 north (Courtland Road)	South end of concurrency with SR 35
Prince George	Templeton			I-95 – Petersburg, Emporia	I-95 exit 41
Prince George	Templeton	41.33	66.51	SR 35 south (Courtland Road) – Courtland	North end of concurrency with SR 35
Prince George	Templeton	41.50	66.79	SR 156 north (Prince George Drive) – Hopewell	
Prince George	Kingwood	45.92	73.90	I-95 – Emporia, Petersburg	I-95 exit 45
City of Petersburg		50.40	81.11	US 301 Alt. north (South Sycamore Street)	
City of Petersburg		51.39	82.70	I-95 / US 460 (US 460 Bus. east) to I-85 – Rocky Mount, NC, Norfolk	I-95 exits 50B-C; south end of concurrency with US 460 Business
City of Petersburg		52.46	84.43	SR 36 east (East Wythe Street)	north end of US 460 Bus. east overlap (southbound)
City of Petersburg		52.56	84.59	US 460 Bus. west (East Washington Street)	north end of US 460 Bus. west overlap (northbound); south end of SR 36 west overlap (northbound only)
City of Petersburg				East Bank Street - Fort Gregg-Adams, Hopewell	
City of Petersburg		53.34	85.84	US 1 south / US 301 Alt. south / SR 36 Truck west (North Adams Street) / SR 36 west (Bollingbrook Street)	north end of SR 36 west overlap (northbound only); south end of US 1 overlap
see US 1
City of Richmond		79.45	127.86	US 1 north (Azalea Avenue)	North end of concurrency with US 1; southern terminus of SR 2 overlap
Henrico		80.04	128.81	I-95 to I-295 – Richmond, Petersburg, Ashland, Washington	I-95 exit 82
Hanover		83.08	133.70	I-295 to I-64 / I-95 – Charlottesville, Washington, Norfolk, Rocky Mount, NC	I-295 exit 41
Hanover	Hanover	93.04	149.73	SR 54 west (East Patrick Henry Road) / SR 1004 (Fire House Road) to I-95 – Ashland	
Caroline	Dawn	97.84	157.46	SR 30 (Dawn Boulevard) – Doswell, West Point, Mattaponi Indian Reservation, Pamunkey Indian Reservation, Kings Dominion	
Caroline				SR 721 (Sparta Road) – Sparta	former SR 14 east
Caroline	Bowling Green	112.35	180.81	US 301 Bus. north / SR 2 north (Richmond Turnpike) – Bowling Green, Fredericksburg	North end of concurrency with SR 2
Caroline	Bowling Green	112.58	181.18	SR 207 west to I-95 / US 1	
Caroline	Bowling Green	113.61	182.84	US 301 Bus. south (East Broaddus Avenue) – Bowling Green, Fredericksburg	
Caroline	Port Royal Crossroads	124.49	200.35	US 17 (Tidewater Trail) – Fredericksburg, Newport News, Tappahannock, Yorktown, Virginia Beach, Pettigrew Wildlife Management Area	
King George	Office Hall	130.74	210.41	SR 3 (Kings Highway) – King George, Montross, George Washington Birthplace National Monument, Westmoreland State Park, Stratford Hall Lee Birthplace	
King George	Edgehill	132.69	213.54	SR 205 (Ridge Road) – King George, Colonial Beach	
King George	Owens	138.56	222.99	SR 218 (Windsor Drive) – Colonial Beach	
King George	Owens	139.12	223.89	SR 206 (Dahlgren Road) – King George, Dahlgren, Naval Base Dahlgren, Caledon Natural Area	
King George		142.70	229.65	US 301 north (Crain Highway) – Baltimore	Northern terminus of US 301 in Virginia; Maryland state line; Harry W. Nice Memorial Bridge over Potomac River
1.000 mi = 1.609 km; 1.000 km = 0.621 mi: Concurrency terminus

== Special routes ==
=== Petersburg alternate route ===
U.S. Route 301 Alternate
- Location: Petersburg
- Length: 2.96 mi (4.76 km)

U.S. Route 301 Alternate (US 301 Alternate) is an alternate route of US 301 in the city of Petersburg. The highway runs 2.96 miles (4.76 km) between junctions with US 301 in the southern and downtown sections of the city. US 301 Alternate follows Sycamore Street between its southern junction with US 301 in the Walnut Hill neighborhood and Old Towne Petersburg. At Wythe Street, which carries US 1, US 460 Business, and SR 36 eastbound, the route splits. Northbound US 301 Alternate follows Jefferson Street and 3rd Street north to reconnect with US 301. The southbound alternate route follows Adams Street, one block of Washington Street, and Sycamore Street to reconnect with the northbound direction at the intersection of Sycamore and Wythe.

=== Bowling Green business route ===
U.S. Route 301 Business
- Location: Bowling Green
- Length: 1.50 mi (2.41 km)

U.S. Route 301 Business (US 301 Business) is a business route of US 301 in Caroline County. The highway runs 1.50 miles (2.41 km) between junctions with US 301 on the south and east sides of Bowling Green. US 301 Business begins south of the town of Bowling Green where US 301 turns onto its two-way ramp to join the Bowling Green Bypass. The business route runs concurrently with SR 2 along Main Street into the town. US 301 Business turns east onto Broaddus Avenue, which heads west as SR 207 Business, and leaves the town before reconnecting with US 301 between the town and Fort A.P. Hill.

U.S. Route 301
Previous state: North Carolina	Virginia	Next state: Maryland

< SR 23	Two‑digit State Routes; 1923-1933	SR 25 >
