= Virginia State Route 139 =

State highway in southern Virginia, US

State Route 139

Route information
- Maintained by VDOT
- Length: 1.48 mi (2.38 km)
- Existed: 1940s–present

Major junctions
- West end: SR 610 / SR 1101 in Jarratt
- East end: US 301 / SR 631 in Jarratt

Location
- Country: United States
- State: Virginia
- Counties: Greensville, Sussex

Highway system
- Virginia Routes; Interstate; US; Primary; Secondary; Byways; History; HOT lanes
| ← SR 138 | → SR 140 |

State Route 139 (SR 139) is a primary state highway in the U.S. state of Virginia. Known for most of its length as Jarratt Avenue, the state highway runs 1.48 miles (2.38 km) from SR 610 east to U.S. Route 301 (US 301) and SR 631 within Jarratt. SR 139 connects the town of Jarratt, which has sections in both Greensville County and Sussex County, to US 301 and, via SR 631, Interstate 95 (I-95).

== Route description ==
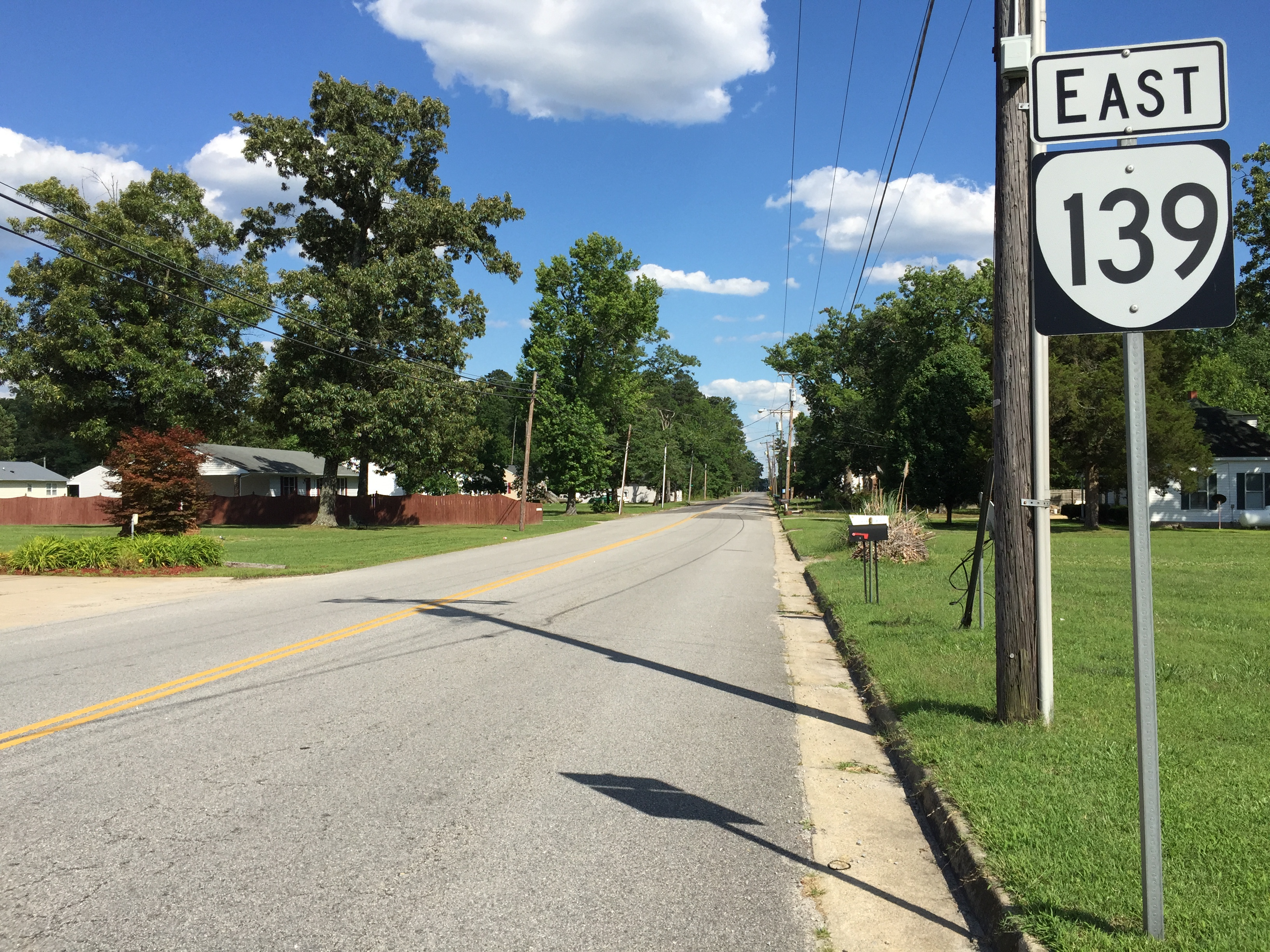
View east along SR 139 at SR 630 in Jarratt

SR 139 begins at a three-way intersection with SR 610 (Allen Road) and SR 1101 (Grigg Avenue) in the western part of the town of Jarratt. The state highway heads northeast as two-lane undivided Allen Road, which intersects a railroad spur that serves the adjacent Georgia-Pacific plant. SR 139 turns southeast onto Jarrett Avenue, which passes through a residential area and crosses the rail spur again. Shortly after crossing the Greensville–Sussex county line, the state highway has an at-grade crossing of CSX's North End Subdivision, then curves to the southeast at the intersection with SR 646 (South Halifax Avenue), only to curve back to the east at Henry Road. SR 139 reaches its eastern terminus at a four-way intersection with US 301 (Blue Star Highway) and SR 631 (Henry Road) at the eastern town limit of Jarratt. SR 631, which forms the east leg of the intersection, has a diamond interchange with I-95 east of US 301.

== Major intersections ==
| County | Location | mi | km | Destinations | Notes |
|---|---|---|---|---|---|
| Greensville | Jarratt | 0.00 | 0.00 | SR 610 (South Allen Road) / SR 1101 (Grigg Avenue) | Western terminus; former SR 137 west |
| Sussex | Jarratt | 1.48 | 2.38 | US 301 (Blue Star Highway) / SR 631 (Jarratt Avenue) to I-95 – Petersburg, Emporia | Eastern terminus; former SR 137 east |
1.000 mi = 1.609 km; 1.000 km = 0.621 mi
