= Moonlight, Virginia =

Unincorporated community in Virginia, United States

- Unincorporated community
- Location within Virginia Location within the United States
- Coordinates: 36°43′49″N 77°30′33″W
- Country: United States
- State: Virginia
- County: Greensville
- Elevation: 108 ft (33 m)
- Time zone: UTC-5 (Eastern (EST))
  - Summer (DST): UTC-4 (EDT)
- GNIS feature ID: 1494247

Moonlight is an unincorporated community in Greensville County, Virginia, United States. It is located just north of Emporia along US 301, near the vicinity of Exits 12 and 13, off Interstate 95.
