= Petersburg Railroad =

Railway Line from Petersburg to Garysburg (1833–1898)

- Original route (Click to enlarge)

Overview
- Headquarters: Petersburg
- Dates of operation: 1833–1898
- Successor: Atlantic Coast Line Railroad

Technical
- Track gauge: 4 ft 8 1/2 in (1,435 mm)
- Length: 60 miles (97 km)

The Petersburg Railroad ran from Petersburg, Virginia, south to Garysburg, North Carolina, from which it ran to Weldon via trackage rights over the Seaboard and Roanoke Railroad (later eliminated with a new alignment).

== History ==
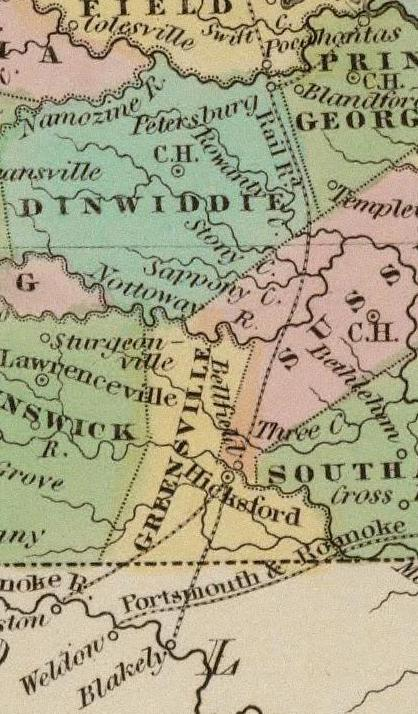
Map of the Petersburg Railroad in 1838

=== Founding ===
In 1830 the North Carolina General Assembly and Virginia General Assembly (state legislatures) granted a charter for the Petersburg Railroad and it opened in 1833. The railroad was partially sponsored by the Commonwealth of Virginia. Against the wishes of the Railroad's principal owner, Francis E. Rives, the State also sponsored the additional Portsmouth and Roanoke Railroad. While the railroads competed, a wheat farmer could get twice the price per bushel for his wheat, by getting to market to meet advertised demands more quickly. Previously, flour had to be moved by bateaux through the Dismal Swamp Canal or through transshipment to carriage taking longer and paying tolls to get from the Roanoke River to Portsmouth and Norfolk.

An 1848 map showed stations at Stony Creek, Jarrat's, Hicksford, Pleasant Hill, Garysburg, and Weldon.

=== 1850s successful operations ===
Competition in the 1850s from north–south rail routes through Lynchburg, to the west, did not cause a decline of revenue. Trade coming from an improved Upper Appomattox Canal Navigation System, improved methods of communication such as telegraphy, and population growth of Richmond and Petersburg contributed to growing profits. The company had enough money to replace the rails on an ongoing basis without taking on debt. In 1855–60, the chief products to ship were cotton, grain, tobacco and flour.

Cars were built with heart pine, ash, white oak, poplar, black walnut, and even mahogany. The cars were painted red, white and French Zinc. Iron was finished with Japan Black. Sperm oil from sperm whales was used as a lubricant for the machinery.

The Petersburg Railroad hired enslaved Africans from plantation owners, listed in the annual reports as hired bonds. In some cases they paid a dollar or two for medical attention to slaves.

In 1857, stations were located at Stony Creek, Jarratt's, Belfield, Hicksborough, Pleasant Hill, Garysburg, and Weldon.

The Petersburg Railroad took 3 hours and fifteen minutes to travel between Petersburg and Weldon.

=== Civil War ===
The Petersburg Railroad saw much action and destruction during the latter part of the American Civil War. During the Civil War, the Petersburg Railroad carried food and equipment to General (CSA) Robert E. Lee's Army of Northern Virginia The Petersburg Railroad carried supplies south and sometimes carried U.S. prisoners of war. The railroad requisitioned supplies from Tredegar Iron Works during the war. Lieutenant General Ulysses S. Grant severed these rails as part of the effort to cut supply lines to Petersburg for the Siege of Petersburg.The rails were damaged in the Battle of Globe Tavern, the Battle of Jerusalem Plank Road and Second Battle of Ream's Station. Since the Petersburg Railroad was the road to Weldon, North Carolina the first two are sometimes referred to as the Battles for the Weldon Railroad.

=== Reconstruction ===
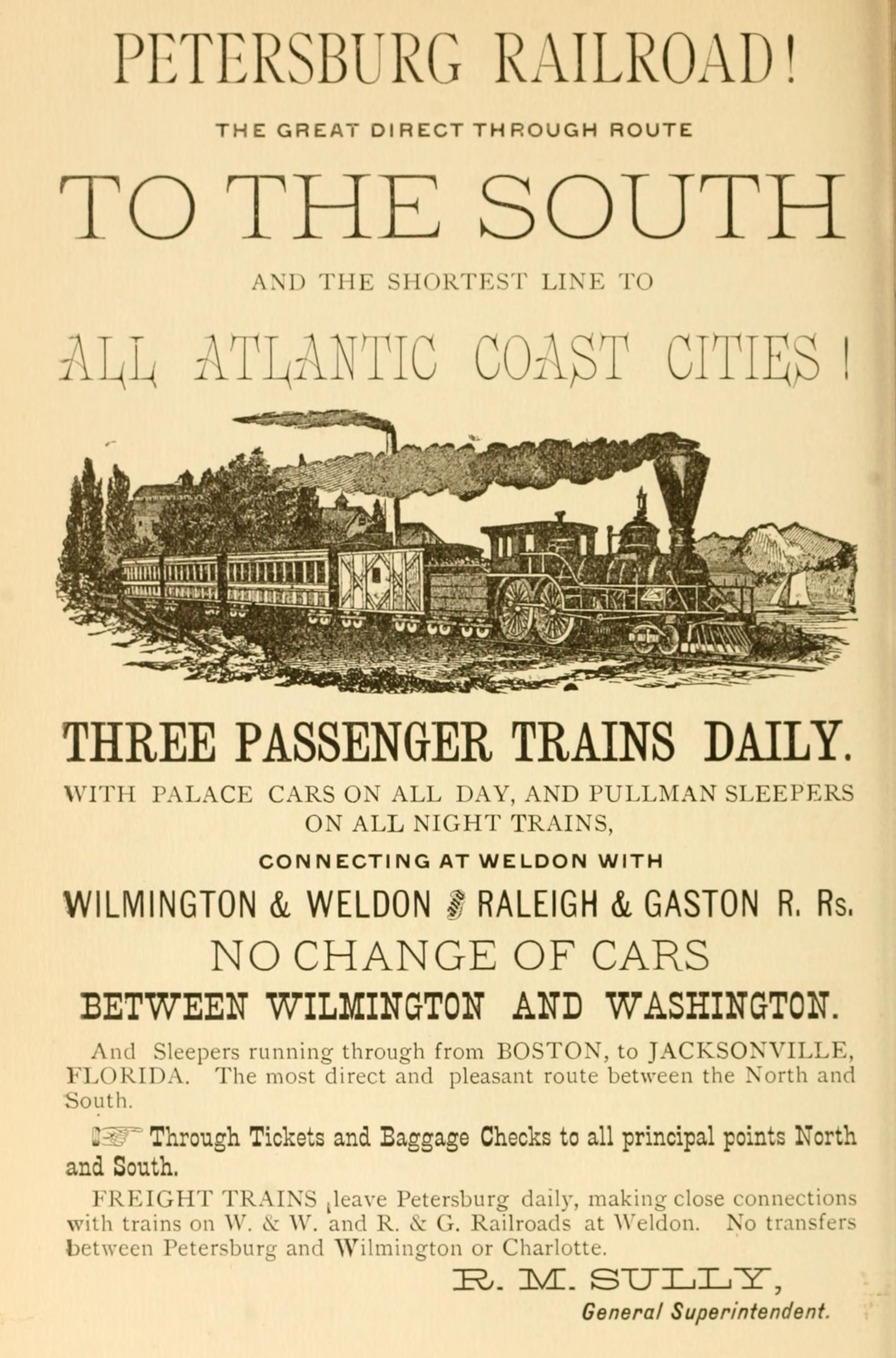
Late 1884 advertisement for the railroad

The Petersburg Railroad Company resumed operations of the railroad after the War in 1866. Ten miles of track and bridges needed to be rebuilt because of damage from the War. The company needed $65,000 for the rails and that much also for the bridges. The railroad company had no funds and could not get a loan. Bonds sold to Northern cities raised only a few thousand dollars. The Adams Express Company and Southern Express Company was willing to give them an advance of $70,000 for an exclusive freight contract for four years. The Federal government of the United States sold them the iron to replace the ten miles of track for $65,000. The bridge over the Roanoke River was rebuilt by a private company owning the Raleigh and Gaston Railroad, which rented the bridge to the Petersburg Railroad.

The train was running by April 11 of 1866 and company began to consolidate and pay debts. There was a small debt to North Carolina and England of $12,000 and $6,600. The Confederate States of America owed money in Confederate States dollars but that did not help as the dollars could not buy anything. A few cars rented by the Seaboard and Roanoke were destroyed and the Seaboard had to pay back the value of the cars. These and other debts were consolidated for $45,000, which was paid over time.

A ferry ran over the Roanoke River until the bridge was rebuilt. Temporary bridges were built over smaller rivers, such as the Meherrin River, with wood from a sawmill that had been moved south to avoid the war. The bridges would be rebuilt permanently with heartwood. Stations had been burned and warehouses were being used instead. Stations would be rebuilt with minimal expenditures. Cotton purchased by the railroad and had not been destroyed could be sold to pay much of the debt.

Before the war, railroads had been built by cities to bring trade into cities. Railroads did not connect through cities. Passengers had to port luggage and stay over night, spending money in cities. Cities could get financially involved in the transporting of goods through cities. During Reconstruction, southern railroads had distant owners who wanted good to pass efficiently through cities. Union stations were created to connect rail lines. In 1866, The Virginia General Assembly allowed the City of Petersburg to open books on the Petersburg Connection Company that connected by rail, the Richmond and Petersburg Railroad to the Petersburg Railroad (to Weldon) and to let these two railroad companies also own parts of the connection company. Twenty years later, in 1886, the railroads to the south of Wilmington were changed to standard gauge on one day in May, allowing point-to-point transportation across the entire east coast.

=== Readjuster Party ===
In 1878, in Petersburg, the Readjuster Party was gaining control of the Virginia General Assembly led by General (CSA) William Mahone and Parson John E. Massey. The readjusters wanted to protect public schools from cuts due to state debt and promised better representation for workers of all races. These efforts included state ownership of railroads. In this climate, in 1878, the Virginia General Assembly gave the City of Petersburg the right to form a board and take over ownership of the Petersburg Railroad.

=== Merger into the Atlantic Coast Line ===
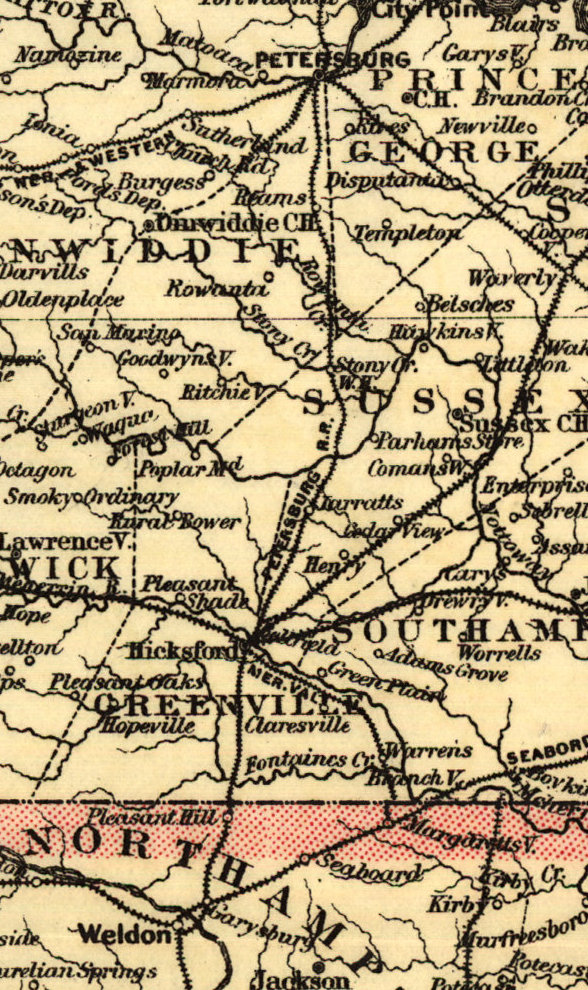
Map by G.W. & C.B. Colton & Co. of the Norfolk, Wilmington, and Charleston Railroad in 1891, cropped to show the Petersburg Railroad

The Petersburg Charter from the 1830s had only been granted until 1891. Wilmington and Weldon Railroad leased the Petersburg railroad, in 1891, and claimed tax exempt status for both railroads. Due to non-taxable nature of Petersburg Railroad, the State legislature only renewed the lease for two years from 1891 to 1893.

William T. Walters of Baltimore, Maryland formed a holding company, in 1889, later called the Atlantic Coast Line of five consecutive railroads starting with the Richmond and Petersburg Railroad and connecting all the way to Charleston, South Carolina. The Atlantic Coast Line Railroad bought the Petersburg Railroad in 1893. In March 1898, the Petersburg Railroad was merged into the Richmond and Petersburg Railroad, which was renamed to the Atlantic Coast Line Railroad of Virginia. In 1900, all five railroads were merged to form the Atlantic Coast Line Railroad from Richmond all the way to Augusta, Georgia. This track is still used today by Amtrak and CSX.

== Employees ==
While slaves and hired workers were used before the civil war, paid employees were hired after the war. The Petersburg Railroad hired general officers and their clerks; station agents and other station men; enginemen, firemen, conductors and other trainmen to operate the trains; machinists, carpenters and other shopmen to repair the trains; section foremen, switchmen, flagmen, watchmen and other trackmen to run the tracks; telegraph operators and telegraph dispatchers to send and receive telegraphs; and over a hundred other laborers.

== Cars ==
The Petersburg Railroad owned 14 locomotives in 1893. They had two first class passenger cars, two second class passenger cars, and three cars for baggage, express and mail. For freight they had 116 box cars, 77 flat cars for oversized freight such as timber, four stock cars, and seven other freight cars. They had four caboose cars, ten for shoveling gravel, and one other car. They owned another 88 cars for their fast freight line service.

The company provided Janney couplers and Westinghouse automatic brakes on the locomotives, the passenger cars, and some of the freight cars, and hand brakes and automatic links on the other cars. The fast freight service had Janney couplers and plain air brakes.

== Stations ==
State	Milepost	City/Location	Station	Connections and notes
VA	A 22.0	Petersburg	Petersburg	replaced by Petersburg Union Station in 1910, which was replaced by the current station in 1955 (which is located on a bypass track around Petersburg built in the 1930s) junction with: Richmond and Petersburg Railroad (ACL); Southside Railroad (N&W)
VA	A 27.1	Petersburg	Collier	
VA	A 31.4		Reams	
VA	A 36.0	Carson	Carson	Today a local library.
VA	A 43.2	Stony Creek	Stony Creek	
VA	A 46.9		Huske	
VA	A 53.2	Jarratt	Jarratt	junction with Virginian Railway (N&W)
VA	A 59.1	Emporia	Bellfield	
VA	A 62.8	Emporia	Emporia	originally Hicksford junction with Atlantic and Danville Railway (N&W)
VA	A 68.1	Skippers	Skippers	also known as Trego
NC	A 74.4	Pleasant Hill	Pleasant Hill	
NC	A 80.1	Garysburg	Garysburg	junction with Seaboard and Roanoke Railroad (SAL)
NC	A 82.6	Weldon	Weldon	junction with: Wilmington and Weldon Railroad (ACL); Raleigh and Gaston Railroad (SAL)
