= Greensville County, Virginia =

County in Virginia, United States

- County
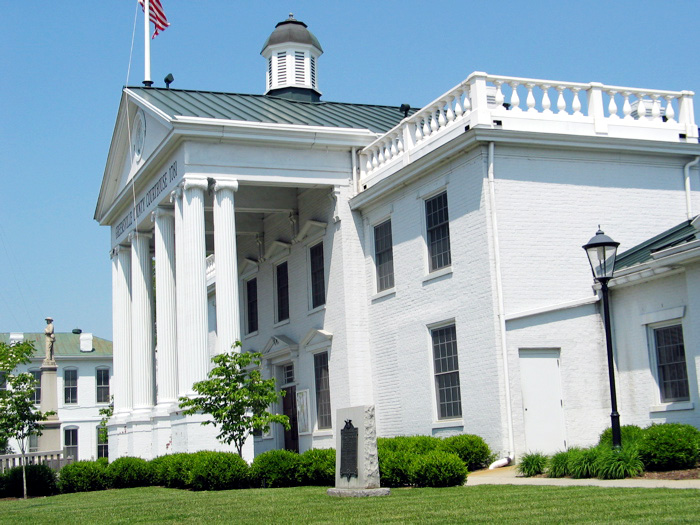
- Greensville County Courthouse, also serving the City of Emporia

- Seal

- Location within the U.S. state of Virginia
- Coordinates: 36°40′N 77°34′W
- Country: United States
- State: Virginia
- Founded: 1780
- Seat: Emporia (independent city)^{1}
- Largest town: Jarratt

Area
  - Total: 297 sq mi (770 km^{2})
  - Land: 295 sq mi (760 km^{2})
  - Water: 2 sq mi (5.2 km^{2}) 0.5%

Population (2020)
  - Total: 11,391
  - Estimate (2025): 11,181 ▼
  - Density: 38/sq mi (15/km^{2})
- Time zone: UTC−5 (Eastern)
  - Summer (DST): UTC−4 (EDT)
- Congressional district: 4th
- Website: www.greensvillecountyva.gov

Greensville County is a county located in the Commonwealth of Virginia. As of the 2020 census, the population was 11,391. Its county seat is the Independent city of Emporia.

== History ==
Greensville County was established in 1781 from Brunswick County. The county is probably named for Sir Richard Grenville, leader of the settlement on Roanoke Island, 1585. There is also belief that it may be named after Nathanael Greene, a major general of the Continental Army and one of George Washington's brightest officers.

An early chapter of the National Association for the Advancement of Colored People was formed in Greensville County and Emporia (the county seat) in May 1940, under the leadership of dentist Dr. F. A. Sealy, of Boydton, Virginia and president of the Mecklenburg County, Virginia branch. However, he died in 1943, as efforts to desegregate the county's schools began with the assistance of attorney Oliver Hill. After service in World War II, Hill's colleague Samuel W. Tucker moved to Emporia, married a schoolteacher and became the county's only African American attorney, as well as a leader in desegregating schools across Virginia.

== Geography ==
According to the U.S. Census Bureau, the county has a total area of 297 square miles (770 km^{2}), of which 295 square miles (760 km^{2}) is land and 1.6 square miles (4.1 km^{2}) (0.5%) is water.

The Meherrin River forms the boundary between Greensville County and Southampton County.

=== Adjacent counties / independent city ===
- Brunswick County – west
- Dinwiddie County – north
- Sussex County – northeast
- Southampton County – east
- Northampton County, North Carolina – south
- Emporia – surrounded by Greensville County

=== Major highways ===
- I-95, the major north–south highway on the Eastern Seaboard enters Greensville County from North Carolina. Access to the county is available at Exits 4, 8, 12, and 13 (plus 11 if including Emporia) before the road crosses the Greensville-Sussex County Line.
- US 58, the principal west–east route through southern Virginia at large, including Greensville County. The road connects the Cumberland Gap area of Tennessee to the Hampton Roads area, entering the county from Brunswick County and leaving at Southampton County. A Business Route of US 58 exists within Emporia.
- US 301, the principal south–north route Greensville County and Emporia until it was supplanted by I-95. A spur of US Route 1, it enters Greensville County from North Carolina, serves as a major boulevard in Historic Emporia, and leaves at Sussex County south of Jarratt.
- SR 139, a state spur route running northwest of US 301 from through Jarratt both in Greensville and Sussex Counties.
- SR 186, a state route briefly entering Greensville County from North Carolina, only to cross into Southampton County at the bridge over the Meherrin River.

== Demographics ==
Historical population
Census	Pop.	Note	%±
1790	6,362		—
1800	6,727		5.7%
1810	6,853		1.9%
1820	6,858		0.1%
1830	7,117		3.8%
1840	6,366		−10.6%
1850	5,639		−11.4%
1860	6,374		13.0%
1870	6,362		−0.2%
1880	8,407		32.1%
1890	8,230		−2.1%
1900	9,758		18.6%
1910	11,890		21.8%
1920	11,606		−2.4%
1930	13,388		15.4%
1940	14,866		11.0%
1950	16,319		9.8%
1960	16,155		−1.0%
1970	9,604		−40.6%
1980	10,903		13.5%
1990	8,853		−18.8%
2000	11,560		30.6%
2010	12,243		5.9%
2020	11,391		−7.0%
2025 (est.)	11,181	▼	−1.8%
U.S. Decennial Census; 1790–1960 1900–1990; 1990–2000 2010 2020

=== Racial and ethnic composition ===
Greensville County, Virginia – Racial and ethnic composition Note: the US Census treats Hispanic/Latino as an ethnic category. This table excludes Latinos from the racial categories and assigns them to a separate category. Hispanics/Latinos may be of any race.
Race / Ethnicity (NH = Non-Hispanic)	Pop 1980	Pop 1990	Pop 2000	Pop 2010	Pop 2020	% 1980	% 1990	% 2000	% 2010	% 2020
White alone (NH)	4,680	3,884	4,461	4,628	4,217	42.92%	43.87%	38.59%	37.80%	37.02%
Black or African American alone (NH)	6,077	4,870	6,881	7,294	6,616	55.74%	55.01%	59.52%	59.58%	58.08%
Native American or Alaska Native alone (NH)	3	11	8	23	19	0.03%	0.12%	0.07%	0.19%	0.17%
Asian alone (NH)	22	23	46	35	32	0.20%	0.26%	0.40%	0.29%	0.28%
Native Hawaiian or Pacific Islander alone (NH)	x	x	2	1	0	x	x	0.02%	0.01%	0.00%
Other race alone (NH)	5	1	19	10	13	0.05%	0.01%	0.16%	0.08%	0.11%
Mixed race or Multiracial (NH)	x	x	35	79	218	x	x	0.30%	0.65%	1.91%
Hispanic or Latino (any race)	116	64	108	173	276	1.06%	0.72%	0.93%	1.41%	2.42%
Total	10,903	8,853	11,560	12,243	11,391	100.00%	100.00%	100.00%	100.00%	100.00%

=== 2020 census ===
As of the 2020 census, the county had a population of 11,391. The median age was 42.3 years. 14.9% of residents were under the age of 18 and 17.5% of residents were 65 years of age or older. For every 100 females there were 164.3 males, and for every 100 females age 18 and over there were 179.8 males age 18 and over.

The racial makeup of the county was 38.3% White, 58.4% Black or African American, 0.3% American Indian and Alaska Native, 0.3% Asian, 0.0% Native Hawaiian and Pacific Islander, 0.4% from some other race, and 2.3% from two or more races. Hispanic or Latino residents of any race comprised 2.4% of the population.

12.2% of residents lived in urban areas, while 87.8% lived in rural areas.

There were 3,442 households in the county, of which 26.9% had children under the age of 18 living with them and 35.0% had a female householder with no spouse or partner present. About 30.8% of all households were made up of individuals and 16.3% had someone living alone who was 65 years of age or older.

There were 4,001 housing units, of which 14.0% were vacant. Among occupied housing units, 70.0% were owner-occupied and 30.0% were renter-occupied. The homeowner vacancy rate was 1.2% and the rental vacancy rate was 9.6%.

=== 2010 census ===
As of the 2010 United States census, there were 12,243 people living in the county. 59.8% were Black or African American, 38.5% White, 0.3% Asian, 0.2% Native American, 0.3% of some other race and 0.8% of two or more races. 1.4% were Hispanic or Latino (of any race).

As of the census of 2000, there were 11,560 people, 3,375 households, and 2,396 families living in the county. The population density was 39 people per square mile (15 people/km^{2}). There were 3,765 housing units at an average density of 13 units per square mile (5.0 units/km^{2}). The racial makeup of the county was 59.75% Black or African American, 38.94% White, 0.10% Native American, 0.40% Asian, 0.02% Pacific Islander, 0.47% from other races, and 0.32% from two or more races. 0.93% of the population were Hispanic or Latino of any race.

There were 3,375 households, out of which 29.30% had children under the age of 18 living with them, 49.80% were married couples living together, 16.00% had a female householder with no husband present, and 29.00% were non-families. 25.40% of all households were made up of individuals, and 11.30% had someone living alone who was 65 years of age or older. The average household size was 2.51 and the average family size was 2.99.

In the county, the population was spread out, with 18.20% under the age of 18, 7.40% from 18 to 24, 38.70% from 25 to 44, 24.20% from 45 to 64, and 11.40% who were 65 years of age or older. The median age was 38 years. For every 100 females there were 160.90 males. For every 100 females aged 18 and over, there were 177.80 males.

The median income for a household in the county was $32,002, and the median income for a family was $38,810. Males had a median income of $24,919 versus $19,849 for females. The per capita income for the county was $14,632. 14.70% of the population and 12.40% of families were below the poverty line. Out of the total people living in poverty, 17.00% are under the age of 18 and 18.60% are 65 or older.

== Government and infrastructure ==
Virginia Department of Corrections operates the Greensville Correctional Center in unincorporated Greensville County, near Jarratt. The facility houses the commonwealth's former execution chamber.

Greensville County has supported the Democratic nominee in every election since 1912, with the exception of 1972 when it backed Richard Nixon during his landslide victory over George McGovern. Its residents did not cast a single vote for Alf Landon in 1936, making the county one of four in which Landon was locked out.

United States presidential election results for Greensville County, Virginia
Year	Republican		Democratic		Third party(ies)	
Year	No.	%	No.	%	No.	%
1912	31	7.73%	294	73.32%	76	18.95%
1916	76	16.17%	392	83.40%	2	0.43%
1920	111	20.63%	424	78.81%	3	0.56%
1924	132	23.04%	417	72.77%	24	4.19%
1928	318	37.99%	519	62.01%	0	0.00%
1932	112	13.81%	692	85.33%	7	0.86%
1936	0	0.00%	884	100.00%	0	0.00%
1940	152	15.22%	843	84.38%	4	0.40%
1944	279	22.55%	954	77.12%	4	0.32%
1948	301	21.09%	710	49.75%	416	29.15%
1952	988	43.47%	1,259	55.39%	26	1.14%
1956	724	29.08%	994	39.92%	772	31.00%
1960	1,057	38.21%	1,676	60.59%	33	1.19%
1964	2,245	49.68%	2,262	50.06%	12	0.27%
1968	529	16.71%	1,367	43.19%	1,269	40.09%
1972	1,608	56.05%	1,197	41.72%	64	2.23%
1976	1,137	31.18%	2,413	66.18%	96	2.63%
1980	1,583	41.66%	2,142	56.37%	75	1.97%
1984	2,304	48.28%	2,352	49.29%	116	2.43%
1988	1,610	43.13%	2,083	55.80%	40	1.07%
1992	1,335	33.49%	2,237	56.12%	414	10.39%
1996	1,176	30.60%	2,381	61.96%	286	7.44%
2000	1,565	40.07%	2,314	59.24%	27	0.69%
2004	1,732	40.68%	2,514	59.04%	12	0.28%
2008	1,729	35.38%	3,122	63.88%	36	0.74%
2012	1,766	35.85%	3,135	63.64%	25	0.51%
2016	1,737	39.81%	2,558	58.63%	68	1.56%
2020	1,914	41.85%	2,627	57.43%	33	0.72%
2024	1,936	44.99%	2,334	54.24%	33	0.77%

== Communities ==
Although Emporia lies within the boundaries of Greensville County and serves as the county seat, it is an independent city and thus not part of the county. But although they are separate, they do share the same public school system.

=== Town ===
- Jarratt (partially in Sussex County)

=== Unincorporated communities ===
- Brink
- Durand
- Low Ground
- Moonlight
- Purdy
- Radium
- Skippers
- Pleasant Shade
- Washington Park
- Westover Hills

== Education ==
Greensville County Public Schools operates public schools for the whole county.

== See also ==
- National Register of Historic Places in Greensville County, Virginia
