= Port Royal Cross Roads, Virginia =

Unincorporated community in Virginia, United States

Coordinates: 38°09′48″N 77°11′59″W

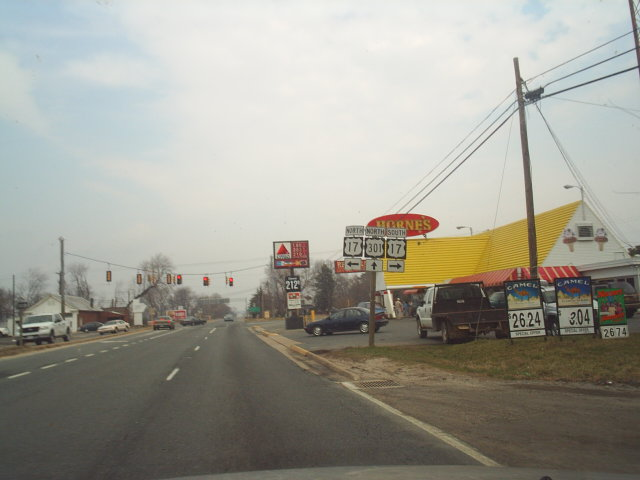
Northbound US 301 at US 17 in March 2005.

Port Royal Cross Roads is an unincorporated community in Caroline County, in the U.S. state of Virginia. The community is located where U.S. Route 301 crosses U.S. Route 17. It is also the location of the last remaining Horne's.
