= Radium, Virginia =

Unincorporated community in Virginia, United States

- Unincorporated community
- Location within Virginia Location within the United States
- Coordinates: 36°43′55″N 77°37′42″W
- Country: United States
- State: Virginia
- County: Greensville
- Elevation: 200 ft (61 m)
- Time zone: UTC-5 (Eastern (EST))
  - Summer (DST): UTC-4 (EDT)
- GNIS feature ID: 1477656

Radium is an unincorporated community in Greensville County, Virginia, United States. The community is located along Virginia Secondary Route 607, which runs north of the Norfolk Southern Railway's Franklin District.
