= CSX A-Line Bridge =

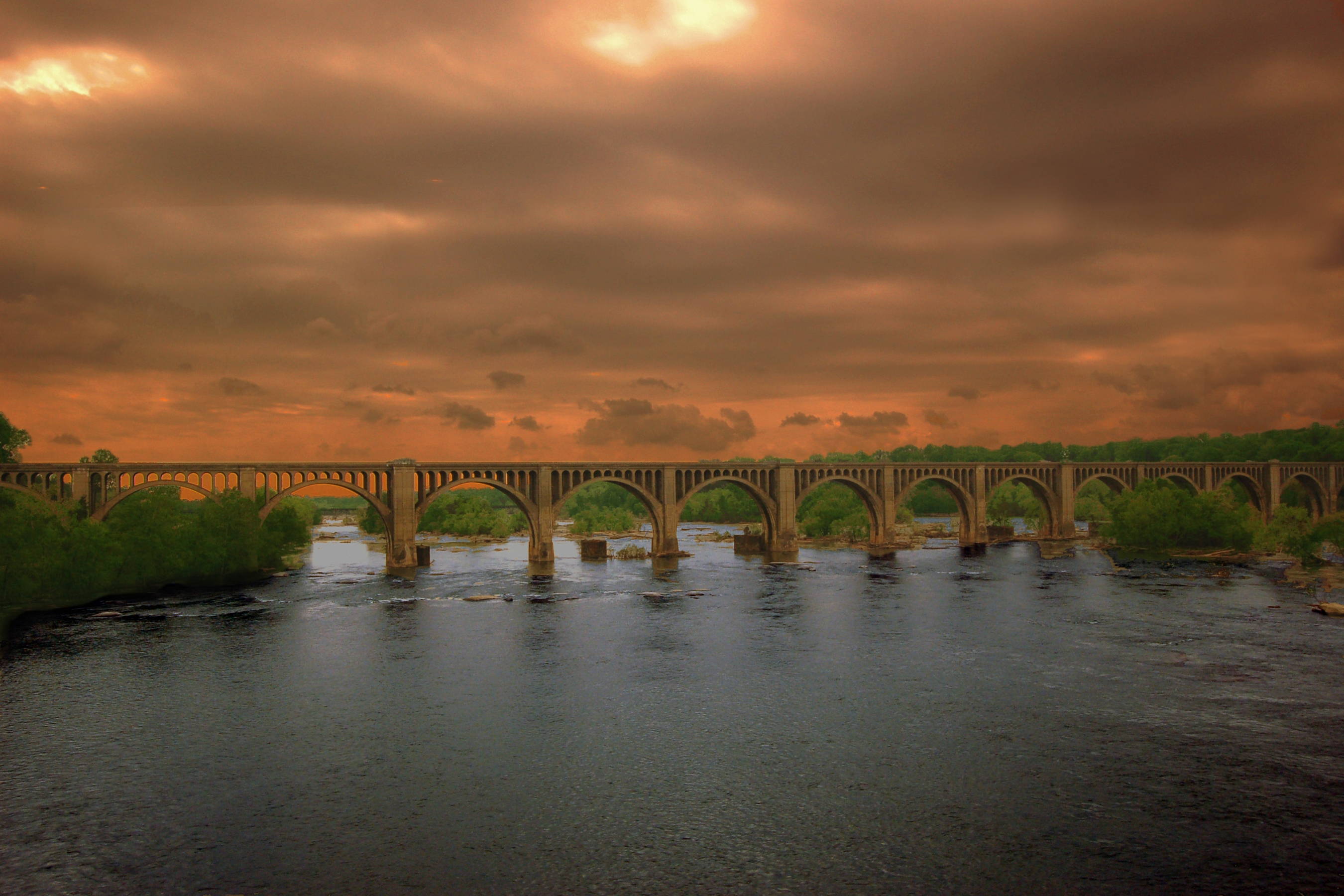
- Coordinates: 37°32′11″N 77°29′38″W
- Carries: North End Subdivision
- Crosses: Rivanna Subdivision, James River, Norfolk Southern Railway
- Locale: Richmond, Virginia

Characteristics
- Design: John Edwin Greiner

History
- Construction end: 1919

Location
- Interactive map of CSX A-Line Bridge

The CSX A-Line Bridge is a double-track concrete bridge that carries the North End Subdivision of CSX Transportation over the James River in Richmond, Virginia. The bridge was built jointly by the Atlantic Coast Line Railroad and Richmond, Fredericksburg and Potomac Railroad in 1919. Designed by John E. Greiner, this bridge was one of many he drew up for the RF&P, and brought early success to his recently established private consulting business. The purpose of this "million dollar bridge" was to create a quicker, more direct route around Richmond by passing over east–west tracks on both sides of the river.

== History ==
The origins of this bridge lay in the Richmond, Fredericksburg and Potomac Railroad (RF&P) and the Richmond and Petersburg Railroad (R&P). The RF&P was chartered in 1834 and ran from its station at the northwest corner of Eighth and Broad Streets north to Fredericksburg (which it reached in 1837) and the Potomac River at Aquia Creek (reached in 1842). A connection to Washington was completed in 1877. The Richmond and Petersburg was chartered in 1836 and ran from Richmond to Petersburg, where the Petersburg Railroad took travelers further south into North Carolina and beyond. Over time it became a part of the larger Atlantic Coast Line Railroad system.

Despite these railroads' lengthy lines, by the time of the Civil War, they did not have a rail connection. This proved to be a problem as freight and passengers had to be hauled from the R&P station to the RF&P station half a mile away up the hill. During the Civil War, when railroads proved to be crucial to the war effort, this lack of a connection was deemed by the Confederate government to be such an issue that it installed temporary trackage up Eighth Street, connecting the two stations. However, the grade of these tracks was impossible to maintain in anything other than a wartime setting. Therefore, after the War ended at Appomattox, a company was established jointly by the RF&P and the R&P with the longest name of a railroad company in the United States, called "The Richmond, Fredericksburg and Potomac and the Richmond and Petersburg Railroad Connection Company." The company was incorporated in 1866 and opened its 1.25 line from the R&P's Byrd Street Station to the RF&P's Elba Station on May 1, 1867.

This inter-city connection railroad hauled passengers and freight efficiently. But it still had problems. The grade between Byrd Street and Elba was still very steep and very tight, especially by the curve around Byrd Street and Belvidere Street. To alleviate the grade and curve dilemma, the R&P and RF&P decided to build a "Belt Line" (so-called because it went around the city instead of through it) track around the city of Richmond in the late 1880s. The original Belt Line railroad split off from the R&P just north of Cofer Road and proceeded in a westwardly direction before heading north to the James River. Here a steel truss, single track bridge was built and finished in 1889. From the James, the Belt Line heads north to the wye that connects it with the old RF&P main line. The 7 1/2-mile long line was finished in 1891. Afterwards, all freight traffic was routed to the Belt Line while all passenger traffic was maintained on the inter-city connection line.

The original, single track Belt Line served its purpose well until the mid-1910s. In 1916, the railroads (by now the Richmond and Petersburg had been merged into the Atlantic Coast Line Railroad, or ACL) decided to build a new, double track Belt Line that would be capable of accommodating increased freight traffic and increased passenger traffic and train lengths. This line was completed around 1920 and featured a straighter alignment south of the James and a beautiful, concrete, double track bridge built in 1919. As a result, the inter-city railroad was torn up and the old belt line steel truss bridge was demolished (excepting the stone piers in the river, which are still visible today) in the early 1920s. The new belt line railroad and James River bridge served the RF&P and ACL for decades until the ACL was merged with its longtime rival, the Seaboard Air Line Railroad (SAL) in 1967, to become the Seaboard Coast Line Railroad (SCL). The SCL later changed its name to the Seaboard System Railroad (SBD) after consolidating several smaller lines in 1982. Four years later, the Seaboard was renamed CSX Transportation, which acquired the Richmond, Fredericksburg and Potomac Railroad in 1991. Therefore, the Belt Line and former ACL and RF&P Bridge, now known as the CSX A-Line Bridge (A-Line is the name CSX gave to the former ACL main line) are fully owned today by CSX and continue to see passenger and freight traffic.
