= Durand, Virginia =

Unincorporated community in Virginia, United States

- Unincorporated community
- Location within Virginia Location within the United States
- Coordinates: 36°43′13″N 77°35′17″W
- Country: United States
- State: Virginia
- County: Greensville
- Elevation: 203 ft (62 m)
- Time zone: UTC-5 (Eastern (EST))
  - Summer (DST): UTC-4 (EDT)
- Area code: 434
- GNIS feature ID: 1494210

Durand is an unincorporated community in Greensville County, Virginia, United States. Durand is primarily a farming community along US 58, west of Emporia.
