= Skippers, Virginia =

Unincorporated community in Virginia, United States

- Unincorporated community
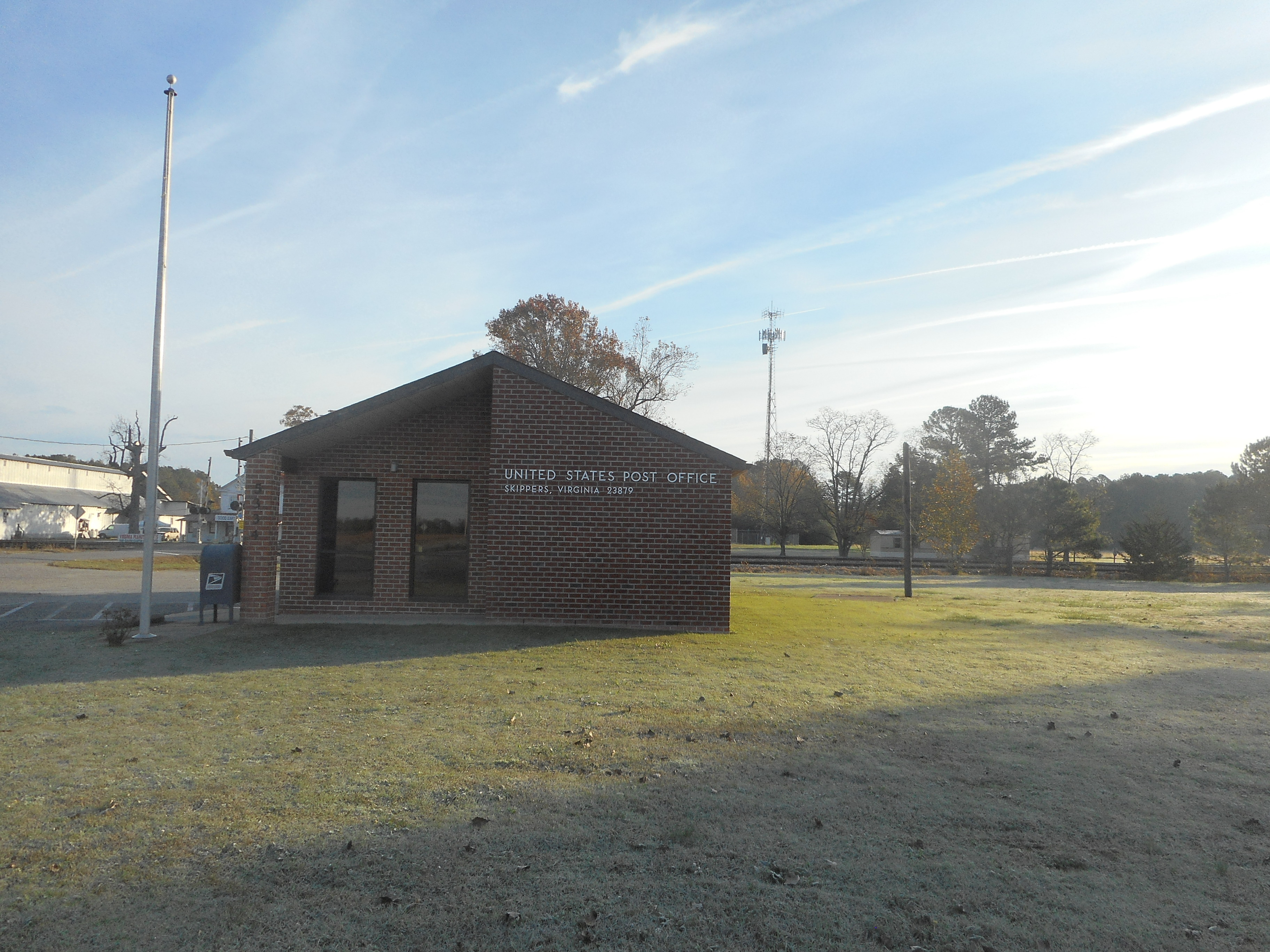
- Skippers, Virginia Post Office

- Location within Virginia Location within the United States
- Coordinates: 36°36′43″N 77°32′48″W
- Country: United States
- State: Virginia
- County: Greensville
- Elevation: 144 ft (44 m)
- Time zone: UTC−5 (Eastern (EST))
  - Summer (DST): UTC−4 (EDT)
- ZIP code: 23879
- GNIS feature ID: 1500116

Skippers is an unincorporated community in Greensville County, Virginia, United States. The community is located along US 301 and Virginia Secondary Route 629 east of Exit 4 along Interstate 95. It is also located along the CSX North End Subdivision, and has a wye that crosses US 301 as it runs west to what is today a quarry owned by Vulcan Materials.

Originally an agricultural community, the primary industries are cotton and peanut farming. Since the latter half of the 20th century, it has been a frequent stop for truck drivers and other travelers along Interstate 95 using the numerous truck stops at Exit 4.
