= Jarratt, Virginia =

- Town
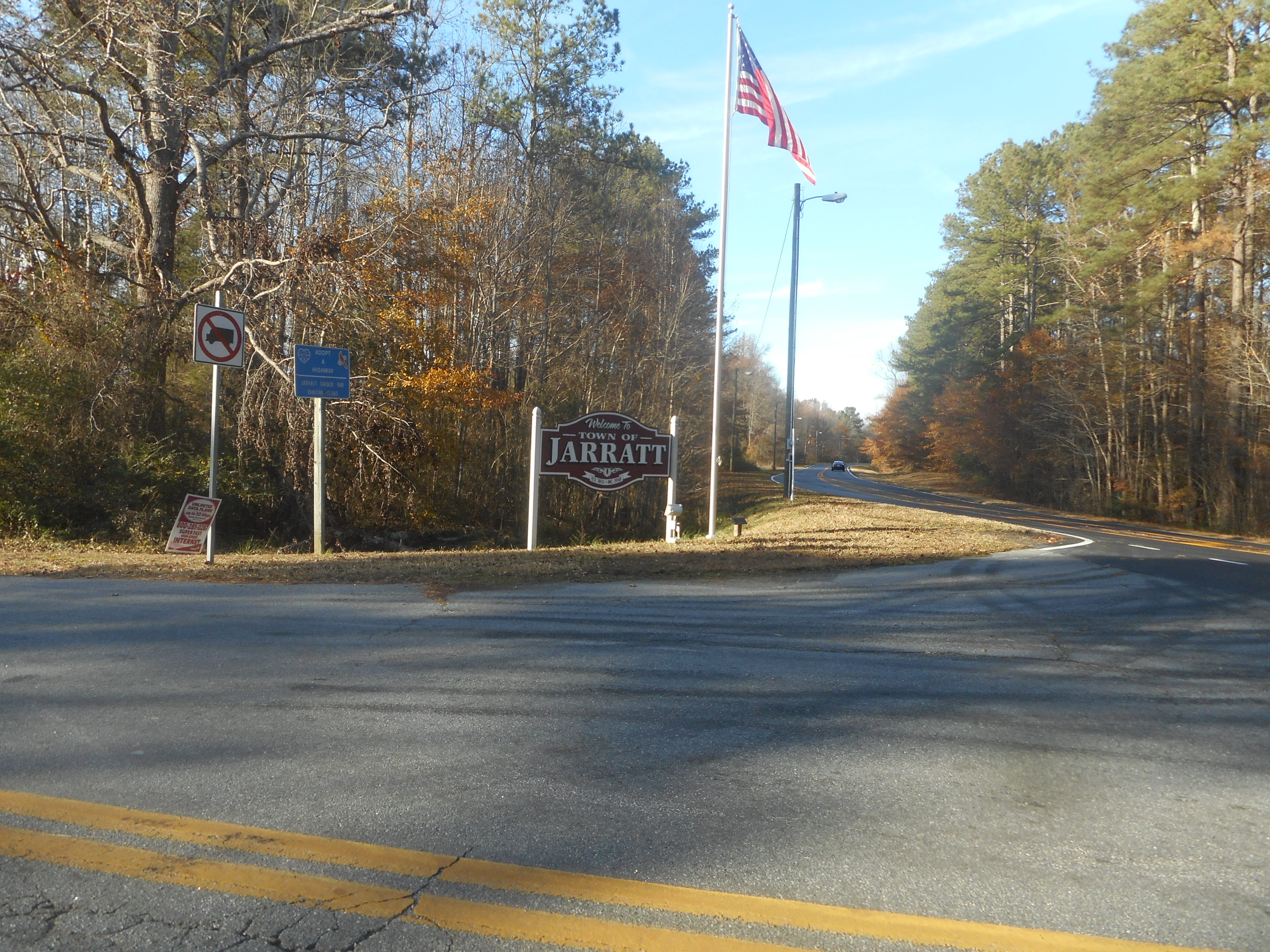
- Welcome sign at VA 139 and Henry Road in Jarratt.

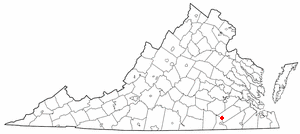
- Location of Jarratt in Virginia
- Coordinates: 36°48′57″N 77°28′11″W
- Country: United States
- State: Virginia
- Counties: Greensville, Sussex

Area
  - Total: 1.26 sq mi (3.26 km^{2})
  - Land: 1.26 sq mi (3.26 km^{2})
  - Water: 0 sq mi (0.00 km^{2})
- Elevation: 151 ft (46 m)

Population (2020)
  - Total: 652
  - Density: 518/sq mi (200/km^{2})
- Time zone: UTC-5 (Eastern (EST))
  - Summer (DST): UTC-4 (EDT)
- ZIP codes: 23867, 23870
- Area code: 434
- FIPS code: 51-40536
- GNIS feature ID: 1495754
- Website: www.jarrattva.com

Jarratt is a town in Greensville and Sussex counties in the U.S. state of Virginia. The population was 652 at the 2020 census. In 1848, Jarratt was a stop on the Petersburg Railroad. Jaratt was incorporated in 1938.

== Geography ==
Jarratt is located on the border of Greensville and Sussex counties, just west of Interstate 95, which provides access from Exit 20 (Henry Road). It is 10 miles (16 km) north of Emporia and 33 miles (53 km) south of Petersburg via I-95.

The former Petersburg Railroad line within the town was acquired by the Atlantic Coast Line Railroad of Virginia, which is today part of the CSX North End Subdivision. It also contained a junction with the main line of the Virginian Railway, which was acquired by the Norfolk and Western Railway, and later abandoned, with the exception of a short spur west from the North End Subdivision to the Georgia-Pacific Jarratt Sheathing Plant.

According to the United States Census Bureau, the town has a total area of 1.3 square miles (3.3 km^{2}), all land.

== Government and infrastructure ==
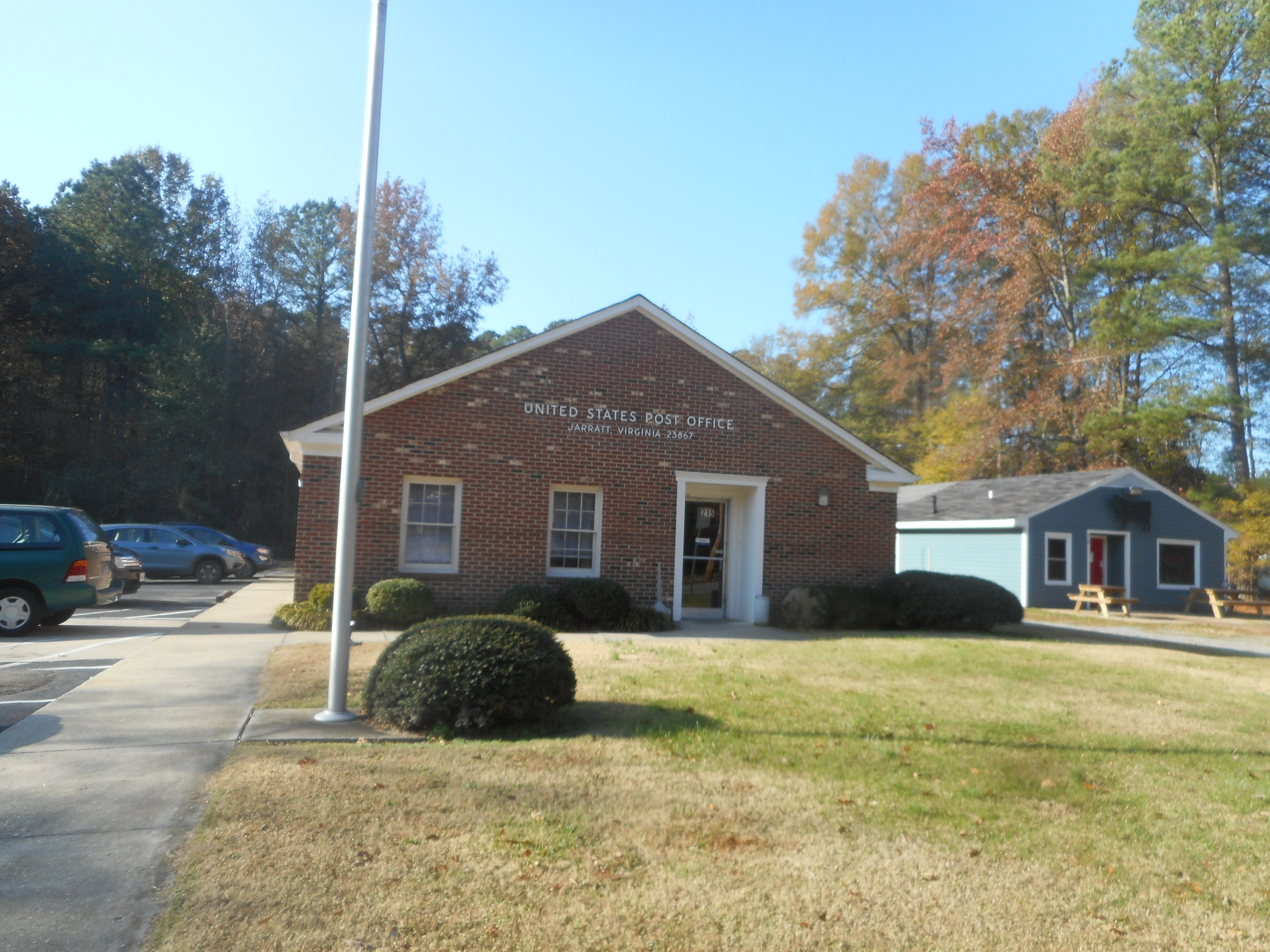
The post office on VA 139 on the Sussex-Greensville County Line.

The United States Postal Service operates the Jarratt Post Office, which is directly on the Sussex-Greensville County Line.

The Virginia Department of Corrections operates the Greensville Correctional Center in unincorporated Greensville County, near Jarratt. Greensville houses the Commonwealth of Virginia execution chamber, which has been obsolete since the abolition of capital punishment in 2021. The largest employer in Jarratt was a Boar's Head plant that closed in September 2024 following a listeria outbreak that killed ten people who consumed deli meat produced there.

== Economy ==
Johns-Manville in 1939 opened a large plant for processing trees into wooden insulation board used in the construction industry.

== Demographics ==
Historical population
Census	Pop.	Note	%±
1940	458		—
1950	574		25.3%
1960	608		5.9%
1970	591		−2.8%
1980	614		3.9%
1990	556		−9.4%
2000	589		5.9%
2010	638		8.3%
2020	652		2.2%
U.S. Decennial Census; 2010-2020

=== Racial and ethnic composition ===
Jarratt town, Virginia – Racial and ethnic composition Note: the US Census treats Hispanic/Latino as an ethnic category. This table excludes Latinos from the racial categories and assigns them to a separate category. Hispanics/Latinos may be of any race.
Race / Ethnicity (NH = Non-Hispanic)	Pop 2000	Pop 2010	Pop 2020	% 2000	% 2010	% 2020
White alone (NH)	372	303	261	63.16%	47.49%	40.03%
Black or African American alone (NH)	212	313	356	35.99%	49.06%	54.60%
Native American or Alaska Native alone (NH)	0	5	3	0.00%	0.78%	0.46%
Asian alone (NH)	1	0	0	0.17%	0.00%	0.00%
Native Hawaiian or Pacific Islander alone (NH)	0	0	0	0.00%	0.00%	0.00%
Other race alone (NH)	2	0	3	0.34%	0.00%	0.46%
Mixed race or Multiracial (NH)	2	3	15	0.34%	0.47%	2.30%
Hispanic or Latino (any race)	0	14	14	0.00%	2.19%	2.15%
Total	589	638	652	100.00%	100.00%	100.00%

=== 2010 census ===
As of the census of 2000, there were 589 people, 271 households, and 175 families residing in the town. The population density was 464.8 people per square mile (179.1/km^{2}). There were 293 housing units at an average density of 231.2 per square mile (89.1/km^{2}). The racial makeup of the town was 63.16% White, 35.99% African American, 0.17% Asian, 0.34% from other races, and 0.34% from two or more races.

There were 271 households, out of which 30.3% had children under the age of 18 living with them, 44.6% were married couples living together, 15.5% had a female householder with no husband present, and 35.1% were non-families. 32.5% of all households were made up of individuals, and 16.6% had someone living alone who was 65 years of age or older. The average household size was 2.17 and the average family size was 2.71.

In the town, the population was spread out, with 22.4% under the age of 18, 7.3% from 18 to 24, 27.0% from 25 to 44, 25.6% from 45 to 64, and 17.7% who were 65 years of age or older. The median age was 41 years. For every 100 females, there were 86.4 males. For every 100 females aged 18 and over, there were 75.8 males.

The median income for a household in the town was $32,125, and the median income for a family was $38,942. Males had a median income of $31,319 versus $30,417 for females. The per capita income for the town was $24,291. About 11.4% of families and 13.0% of the population were below the poverty line, including 13.3% of those under age 18 and 8.5% of those age 65 or over.

== Education ==
The Greensville County portion is in Greensville County Public Schools.

The Sussex County portion is in Sussex County Public Schools.
