= Richmond Terminal Subdivision =

Railway line in Virginia

The Richmond Terminal Subdivision is a railroad line owned by CSX Transportation in Virginia. The line is located within Richmond, Virginia, for a total of 4.3 miles. At its north end it continues south from the RF&P Subdivision and at its south end it continues south as the Bellwood Subdivision, which connects to CSX's S Line. It junctions with the North End Subdivision, which connects to CSX's A Line, at AY Interlocking.

The Richmond Terminal Subdivision runs along track that was originally part of the Richmond, Fredericksburg and Potomac Railroad.

Acca Yard, a major CSX freight yard, is located on the Subdivision. Acca Yard was named after either nearby Acca farm or the Shriner Acca temple, established in 1886. Both of these places were named after the city of Acca in the Holy Land. The farm was owned by Preston Belvin, a Richmond furniture manufacturer who also founded the Richmond Shriner order. The farm was located off of Westwood Ave and is now built over either by houses or Interstates 64 and 95. Acca farm lent its name to Acca Station, situated at the intersection of Westwood Avenue and the RF&P tracks. Thus, it is most likely that Acca yard was named after the farm, vis-a-vis the railroad station. Acca yard was established sometime in the 1890s or early 1900s. It housed machine shops for the Rf&P which were built in the 1920s and replaced by a newer shop in the 1960s, which continues to operate today for CSX.

Slow speeds through Acca yard have frequently caused 20-30 minute delays to Amtrak passenger trains. The completion of a bypass around Acca Yard (plus 8 miles (13 km) of new double track south of Petersburg) in March 2019 allowed a second Northeast Regional round trip to Norfolk to begin. The $132 million project was funded $119 million by the state and $13 million by CSX.

== See also ==
- List of CSX Transportation lines
