= Brink, Virginia =

Unincorporated community in Virginia, United States

- Unincorporated community
- Location within Virginia Location within the United States
- Coordinates: 36°37′5″N 77°38′4″W
- Country: United States
- State: Virginia
- County: Greensville
- Elevation: 230 ft (70 m)
- Time zone: UTC-5 (Eastern (EST))
  - Summer (DST): UTC-4 (EDT)
- GNIS feature ID: 1477143

Brink is an unincorporated community in Greensville County, Virginia, United States. Brink is located within the vicinity of the intersections of Virginia Secondary Routes 627 and 633, southwest of the city of Emporia.
