= North End Subdivision =

Railway line in Virginia and North Carolina

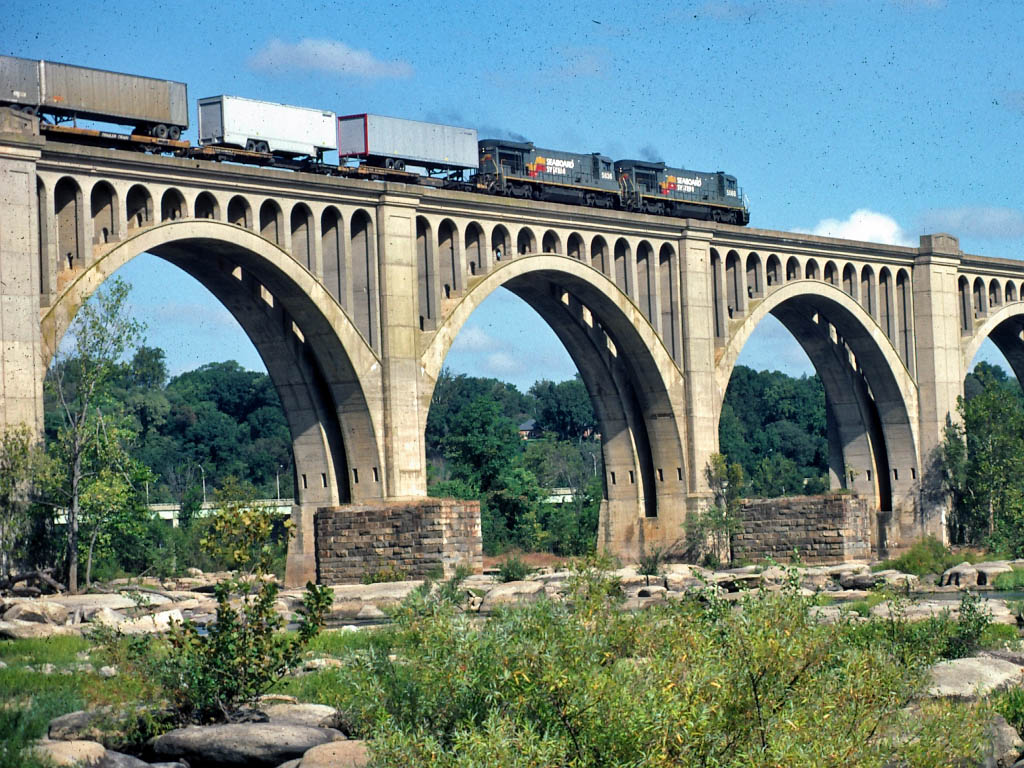
North End Subdivision's arch bridge over the James River near Richmond in 1985

The North End Subdivision is a railroad line owned by CSX Transportation in Virginia and North Carolina. The line runs from Richmond, Virginia, to Rocky Mount, North Carolina, for a total of 123.2 miles. At its north end the line continues south from the Richmond Terminal Subdivision and at its south end the line continues south as the South End Subdivision. The North End Subdivision is the northernmost segment of CSX's A Line which in its entirety runs from Richmond to Tampa, Florida. Some of the line's notable features include running in the median of Interstate 195 in Richmond as well as the line's tall arch bridge over the James River.

== History ==
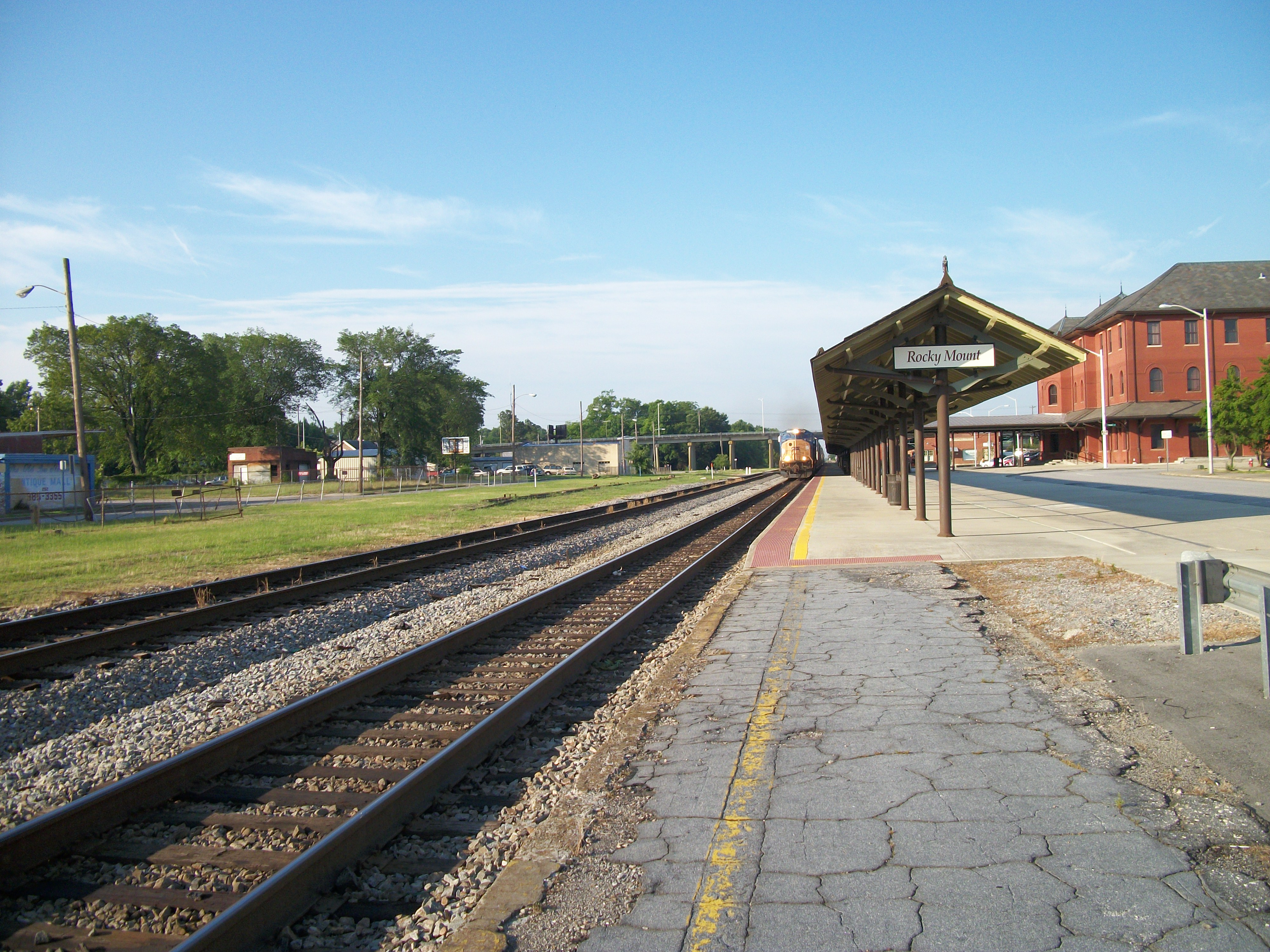
CSX Train coming north onto the North End Subdivision at Rocky Mount station.

The North End Subdivision north of the James River was originally part of the Richmond, Fredericksburg and Potomac Railroad. The route south of the river were built by predecessors of the Atlantic Coast Line Railroad.

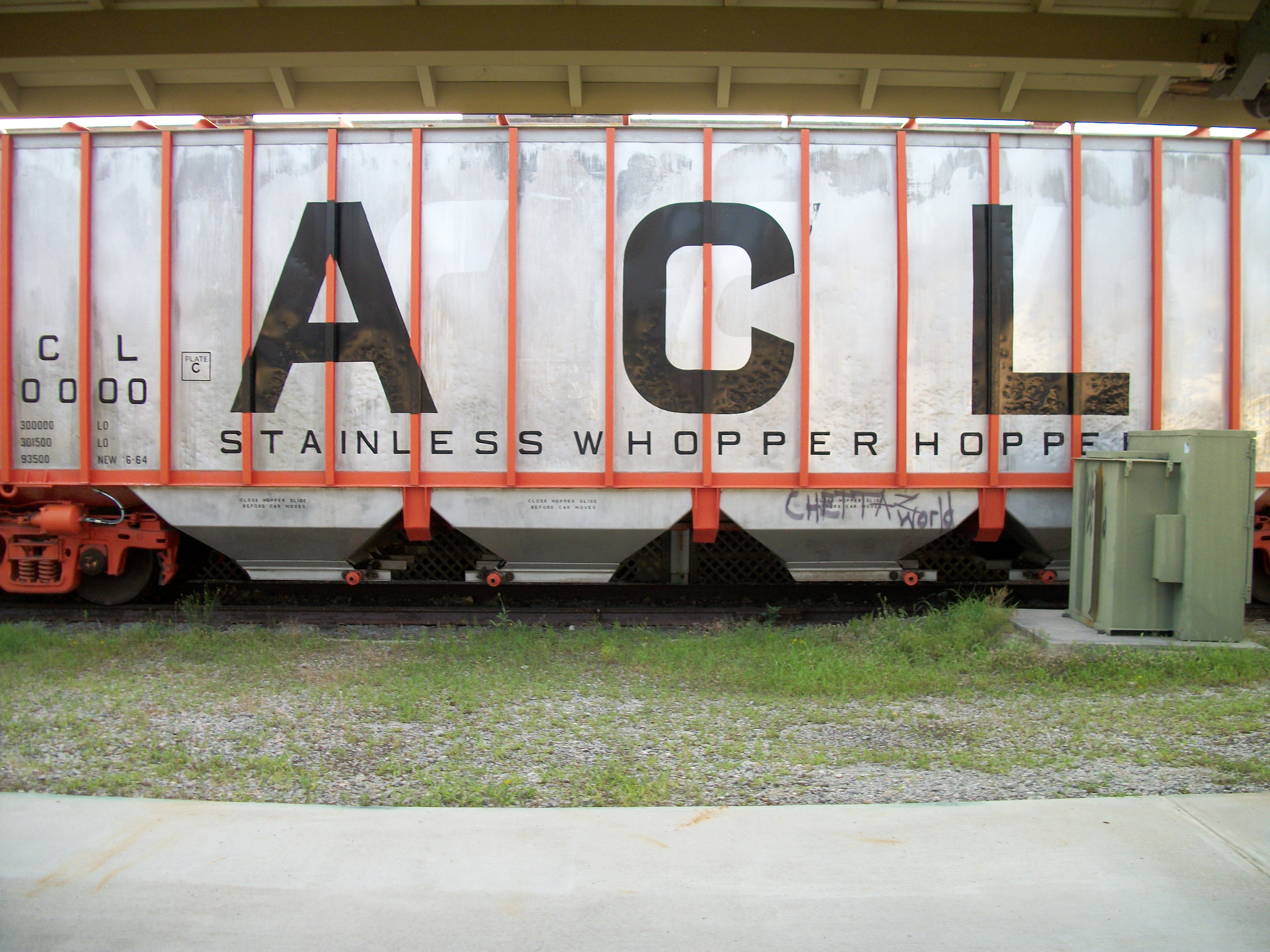
ACL Whopper Hopper on display at Rocky Mount Amtrak station.

The earliest segment of the North End Subdivision was built in 1833 by the Petersburg Railroad from Petersburg, Virginia to Weldon, North Carolina. In 1838, the Richmond and Petersburg Railroad was built from just south of Richmond to Petersburg connecting with the Petersburg Railroad. After the Richmond and Petersburg Railroad was completed, the Richmond and Petersburg Railroad Bridge was built over the James River (which was located just west of the present-day Manchester Bridge). Ruins of this bridge still remain today. In 1840, the Wilmington and Weldon Railroad was built at the southern end of the Petersburg Railroad south to Rocky Mount (which continued to Wilson, North Carolina).

The Richmond and Petersburg Railroad, Petersburg Railroad, and the Wilmington and Weldon Railroad would all become part the main line of the Atlantic Coast Line Railroad in 1900.

In 1891, the current track crossing of the James River was built by the Richmond, Fredericksburg and Potomac Railroad and the Richmond and Petersburg Railroad. Known as the Belt Line, it was built as a freight bypass to the original route. The first bridge over the river on this route was replaced by the current arch bridge in 1919, which was built jointly by the Atlantic Coast Line Railroad and the Richmond, Fredericksburg and Potomac Railroad. Some of the foundations of the previous bridge remain beside the current structure. The Atlantic Coast Line, Seaboard Air Line, and Richmond, Fredericksburg and Potomac Railroads would all become part of CSX by 1986.

== See also ==
- List of CSX Transportation lines
- Richmond and Petersburg Railroad
- Petersburg Railroad
- Wilmington and Weldon Railroad
