= Moonlight (disambiguation) =

Moonlight is the reflected light that comes to Earth from the Moon.

Moonlight may also refer to:

== Places ==
- Moonlight, Indiana
- Moonlight, Kansas
- Moonlight, Virginia

== Arts, entertainment, and media ==
=== Films ===
- Moonlight (1932 film), a French comedy
- Moonlight (2002 film), a Dutch thriller
- Moonlight (2016 film), an American drama; winner of Best Picture Oscar

=== Literature ===
- Moonlight (play), by Harold Pinter
- Moonlight, a novel in the Dark Guardian series by Rachel Hawthorne

=== Music ===
- Moonlight (band), a Polish gothic/progressive metal band

==== Albums ====
- Moonlight (EP), by Candy Coded
- Moonlight, a 2021 album by L'Algérino
- Moonlight, an album by Plastic Tree
- Moonlight, an album by Hanni El Khatib
- Moonlight, an album by Steve Cole

==== Songs ====
- "Moonlight" (Agust D song)
- "Moonlight" (Bob Dylan song)
- "Moonlight" (Barry Gibb song), later recorded by Jerry Vale
- "Moonlight" (Grace VanderWaal song)
- "Moonlight" (Kali Uchis song)
- "Moonlight" (MAX song)
- "Moonlight" (XXXTentacion song)
- "Moonlight", a song by Sting from the 1995 film Sabrina
- "Moonlight", a song by Ariana Grande from the album Dangerous Woman
- "Moonlight", a song by Chris Brown from the album 11:11
- "Moonlight", a song by Jay-Z from the album 4:44
- "Moonlight", a song by Lil Xan and Charli XCX from the album Total Xanarchy
- "Moonlight", a composition by Kenny G from the album The Moment
- "Moonlight (A Vampire's Dream)", a song by Stevie Nicks from her album In Your Dreams
- "Moonlight", a song by Twice from the album Formula of Love: O+T=<3
- "Moonlight", a song by Exo from Overdose

=== Other arts and media ===
- Moonlight (painting), 1777, by Philip James de Loutherbourg
- Moonlight (American TV series), an American paranormal romance drama
- Moonlight (Chinese TV series), a 2021 Chinese romantic comedy television series

== Other uses ==
- Moonlight (runtime), a Linux implementation of the Microsoft Silverlight web application framework
- Moonlight (shipwreck), in Lake Superior
- MoonLIGHT, a laser reflector once planned to be placed near the Moon's south pole
- Moonlight Initiative, an initiative by the European Space Agency expanding satellite navigation and communication links to the Moon

== See also ==
- Moonlight Sonata, the popular name of Beethoven's Piano Sonata No. 14, Opus 27 No. 2
- "Moonlight Serenade", a 1939 song by Glenn Miller
- Light (disambiguation)
- Lighting
- Moon (disambiguation)
- Moonbeam (disambiguation)
- Moonglow (disambiguation)
- Moonglows
- MoonLITE, a proposed British space mission
- Moonlight Sonata (disambiguation)
- Moonlighting (disambiguation)
- Moonray (disambiguation)
- Moonshine (disambiguation)
- Mr. Moonlight (disambiguation)
- Clair de Lune (disambiguation)
- Lighting done with Moonlight towers
