= Moonshine (disambiguation) =

Moonshine is illicitly distilled high-proof liquor.

Moonshine may also refer to:

- Moonlight, the light that reaches Earth from the Moon

== Film and television ==
- Moonshine (film), a 1918 American silent comedy starring Fatty Arbuckle and Buster Keaton
- Moonshine (Canadian TV series), a 2021 Canadian drama series
- Moonshine (South Korean TV series), a 2021 television series

== Music ==
- Moonshine Music, an American record label 1992–2007
- Moonshine (music collective), an Afro-diasporic artist collective, party and record label started in 2014

=== Albums ===
- Moonshine (Bert Jansch album) or the title song, 1973
- Moonshine (Brian Cadd album) or the title song, 1974
- Moonshine (Dave Douglas album) or the title song, 2007
- Moonshine (Kate Maki album), 2011
- Moonshine (Savage album) or the title song (see below), 2005
- Moonshine (Tyler Carter album) or the title song, 2019
- Moonshine (mixtape), 2017

=== Songs ===
- "Moonshine" (Bruno Mars song), 2012
- "Moonshine" (Savage song), 2005
- "Moonshine", by Badfinger from Head First, 2000
- "Moonshine", by Caravan Palace from Chronologic, 2019
- "Moonshine", by Dennis Wilson from Pacific Ocean Blue, 1977
- "Moonshine", by Feeder from Comfort in Sound, 2002
- "Moonshine", by Fran Healy from Wreckorder, 2010
- "Moonshine", by Free from Tons of Sobs, 1969
- "Moonshine", by Lights from Skin & Earth, 2017
- "Moonshine", by Mike Oldfield from Tubular Bells II, 1992
- "Moonshine", by Mike Oldfield from Man on the Rocks, 2014
- "Moonshine", by Puddle of Mudd from Famous, 2007

== Places ==
- Moonshine, Illinois, US
- Moonshine, Louisiana, US
- Moonshine Township, Big Stone County, Minnesota, US
- Moonshine, New Zealand

== Other uses ==
- Moonshine (electronics), a World War II British electronic counter-measure
- Moonshine theory, a mathematical theory
- Fedora 7, codenamed Moonshine, the May 2007 version of the Fedora Linux distribution
- Moonshine, a 2007 Cal Leandros series novel by Rob Thurman

== See also ==
- Moonshiner (disambiguation)
- Moonbeam (disambiguation)
- Moonlight (disambiguation)
- Moonray (disambiguation)
