= Moonray =

Moonray or moon ray may refer to:

- Moonlight, the light that reaches Earth from the Moon
- Moon Ray (Italian: Raggio Di Luna), an Italo disco group
- "Moonray" aka "Moon Ray", a 1939 Artie Shaw composition
- "Moonray", a 1962 song by Shirley Scott from Horace Silver on the album Shirley Scott Plays Horace Silver
- MoonRay, a DreamWorks's open source ray tracing renderer; see Bilby (film) § Resurrection

== See also ==
- Moonbeam (disambiguation)
- Moonlight (disambiguation)
- Moonshine (disambiguation)
- Moon (disambiguation)
- Ray (disambiguation)
