= Moonbeam =

Moonbeam may refer to:

- Moonlight, the light that reaches Earth from the Moon
- Moonbeam (band), a trance music group from Russia
- Moonbeam, Ontario, a township in Canada
- Moonbeam, a nickname of the American politician Jerry Brown (born 1938)
- Moonbeams, a children's cancer charity
- Moon Beams, jazz album by Bill Evans
- "Moonbeam", a song from Men Without Hats' album Pop Goes the World
- Moonbeam, a cultivar of the flowering plant Coreopsis verticillata
- Moonbeam, series of five aeroplanes built by Powel Crosley, Jr.
- Moonbeam II, a plane flown by aviation pioneer Edwin Moon in 1910
- Moonbeam III or Moonbeam IV, yachts designed by William Fife
- Dead Girl/Moonbeam, a Marvel Comics character and member of X-Statix

== See also ==
- Beam (disambiguation)
- Moon (disambiguation)
- Moonlight (disambiguation)
- Moonray (disambiguation)
- Moonshine (disambiguation)
