= Digital Veil =

Studio album by The Human Abstract
- Released: March 8, 2011
- Recorded: June–July 2010
- Studios: The Machine Shop, Weehawken, New Jersey
- Genres: Progressive metal; neoclassical metal; metalcore
- Length: 36:46
- Label: E1
- Producer: Will Putney

The Human Abstract chronology
Midheaven (2008)	Digital Veil (2011)	Moonlight Sonata (2012)

Digital Veil is the third album by American progressive metal band The Human Abstract. The album was released on March 8, 2011, through E1 Music. Digital Veil marks the return of founding guitarist A.J. Minette, who left in 2007, and the introduction of the new lead vocalist Travis Richter, who replaced former vocalist Nathan Ells. The first single off the album, titled "Faust," was released digitally on November 16, 2010.

== Background ==
Prior to working on Digital Veil, The Human Abstract went through a few line-up changes. In November 2009, the band announced that they had parted ways with vocalist Nathan Ells who sang on 2006's Nocturne and 2008's Midheaven. Due to conflicting statements from the band and Ells, there was some debate on whether the singer quit or was fired. After his departure, the group held open auditions for a new singer. In April 2010, The Human Abstract announced that Travis Richter of The Color of Violence, and formerly of From First to Last, would replace Ells on vocals. Guitarist Andrew Tapley personally called Richter and asked him to try out by first recording his vocals for "Vela Together We Await the Storm" and then a demo song from Digital Veil. Richter knew the band through previously touring in From First to Last with The Human Abstract on Warped Tour and the Take Action Tour.

The band also reunited with their founding guitarist and primary songwriter A.J. Minette. Minette left the band after the touring cycle for Nocturne and continued his education in classical music, and was also trying to avoid being "pigeonholed as a metal guitarist." According to bassist Henry Selva, Minette also brought back a level of discipline to the band that was absent during the Midheaven sessions.

== Writing and recording ==
"It's a really big challenge writing for the Human Abstract, because the music is so technical. It's a lot of time-signature changes and fancy stuff I'll probably never understand, but I pick up on the feeling of it, for sure. I'll sit in the vocal booth with my laptop, playing songs over and over and over to pick up on all the intricacies of the music."

— Travis Richter, Alternative Press

The Human Abstract took time away from their touring schedule in June 2009 to begin writing their third studio album. While writing was underway, drummer Brett Powell contacted A.J. Minette and asked him if he wanted to return as a producer for the material they had been working on. After accepting the request and assuming the role of producer, he began having an increasing input on writing until "eventually it just became an album." The schooling that Minette received during his time spent outside of The Human Abstract had a strong impact on his writing for Digital Veil. Minette said that, "It has been exciting to write metal music again. We all want to make something that we can believe in, so we all have been digging deeper to become better musicians and composers. I wanted to take my classical studies and apply them to metal, but I did not want it to turn out sounding like power metal."

Travis Richter officially began writing for Digital Veil after formally joining the band and flying to Los Angeles, California on February 1, 2010. While he still retains his more aggressive vocal stylings from his previous projects, Richter also showcases his singing on the album. In his youth he grew up singing in a choir for a southern Baptist church. The Human Abstract's music was far more technical and complex than anything from Richter's background, which resulted in some initial acclimation and adjustments for this new setting. The lyrics written for Digital Veil discuss "ideas about identity, personal transformation and purpose."

The band entered The Machine Shop studio with producer William Putney on July 1, 2010. During production, Putney suffered a serious head injury requiring 57 staples to close the wound. Shortly after leaving the studio to buy cigarettes, he called Dean Herrera and said, "My head's bleeding, can you bring some paper towels." Putney was found at the bottom of some stairs just outside the studio in a puddle of blood, and was quickly rushed to the hospital. During his absence, Herrera filled in as a temporary producer. However, William Putney returned to the studio just two days after the incident. Commenting on the producer's quick recovery, A.J. Minette stated, "Most normal men would have been sidelined for a while, but Will has a work ethic and dedication to his job that separates him from the rest."

== Release and promotion ==
The "Faust" digital single cover art.

Promotion and marketing for Digital Veil was originally being handled by Hopeless Records, The Human Abstract's label since their debut album Nocturne in 2006. Through Hopeless Records, the band released the promotional single "Faust" from Digital Veil on November 16, 2010, and an early 2011 release date was anticipated for the record. However, on January 10, The Human Abstract announced that they had signed to E1 Music and the album would be released on March 8, 2011. On signing to a major label, Henry Selva commented that they expected E1 to "help push the band a step forward into a productive and exciting future."

Prior to the release of Digital Veil, The Human Abstract previewed an additional two songs online after the release of "Faust" and the announcement of signing to E1. The song "Patterns" was available on January 18, and "Complex Terms" was available on February 15. A Scott Hansen directed promotional music video for the title track "Digital Veil" was also released in February 2011. Hansen also directed the video for "Patterns," which was released on April 13.

=== Touring ===
When guitarist A.J. Minette rejoined the band in 2009, it was uncertain if he would be able to tour with The Human Abstract in support of Digital Veil due to his prior commitment of working toward his master's degree at the University of Southern California School of Music. However, he later decided to take a year off from school to free up his schedule specifically for touring in support of the record. A few weeks before the band left on tour, The Human Abstract decided to part ways with guitarist Andrew Tapley. The first tour The Human Abstract embarked on in promotion of Digital Veil was the Atticus Metal Tour III sponsored by Atticus Clothing. The tour lasted February–March 2011 with Darkest Hour, Born of Osiris and As Blood Runs Black. The Human Abstract's first scheduled headlining tour in support of Digital Veil was the "Pull Me from the Gallows Tour" which was supposed to run May–June 2011 across the United States. The opening acts for this leg were: Scale the Summit, This or the Apocalypse, Letlive, No Bragging Rights and Across the Sun. However, midway into the tour The Human Abstract pulled out of the tour due to a sudden death in the family.

Shortly before embarking on the "Frak the Gods" tour in September 2011 with Periphery, Textures and The Contortionist, vocalist Travis Richter abruptly quit the band. The Human Abstract quickly replaced him with Ryan Devlin of the progressive metal band Corelia as a temporary touring member.

== Reception ==
Professional ratings
Review scores
Source	Rating
AllMusic	4.5/5 stars
Alternative Press	4/5 stars
Heavy Blog Is Heavy	5/5 stars
Rockfreaks.net	9/10 stars

=== Charts and sales ===
In its debut week, Digital Veil sold approximately 3,200 copies in the United States allowing it to enter the Billboard 200 chart at number 177. The album also ranked at number 5 on the US Top Heatseekers chart. These figures are slightly lower than those for The Human Abstract's previous album, Midheaven, which sold around 4,100 copies and ranked at number 163 on the Billboard 200.

== Track listing ==
All tracks are written by The Human Abstract.

No.	Title	Length
1.	"Elegiac"	2:11
2.	"Complex Terms"	5:10
3.	"Digital Veil"	3:30
4.	"Faust"	5:56
5.	"Antebellum"	7:29
6.	"Holographic Sight"	4:28
7.	"Horizon to Zenith"	4:19
8.	"Patterns"	3:43
Total length:		36:46

== Personnel ==
The Human Abstract

- Travis Richter – lead vocals
- A.J. Minette – guitar, keyboards
- Dean Herrera – guitar
- Andrew Tapley – guitar
- Henry Selva – bass guitar
- Brett Powell – drums

Production

- Produced & mixed by Will Putney
- Engineered by Dean Herrera, Jay Sakong & Bill Purcell
- Mastered by Jamie Fergus Jean
- Management by Andrew Jarrin & Jason Mageau
- Legal advisor: Ian J. Friedmann
- Artwork & layout by Aaron Marsh
- Photo by Lauren Steil
- Model: Mia Weier
