= Moonlighter =

Moonlighter or The Moonlighter(s) can refer to:

- Moonlighter, a person who works another job, often at night, for extra income
- Moonlighter (video game), a 2018 indie video game
- Moonlighter (fish), a species of fish
- The Moonlighter, a 1953 Western film
- Bobby Lester & The Moonlighters, an incarnation of The Moonglows
- Bliss Blood side project called The Moonlighters, a 1920s-style jazz string band
- Dendrocnide moroides, the most toxic of the Australian species of stinging trees, which has several nicknames including "the moonlighter"
- Moonlighters, a public information film about the dangers of playing with lighters

== See also ==
- Moonlight (disambiguation)
- Moonlighting (disambiguation)
