= Moonshine Valley, New Zealand =

Valley in Upper Hutt, New Zealand

Moonshine Valley
- Rural locality
- Moonshine Road
- Interactive map of Moonshine Valley
- Coordinates: 41°05′30″S 175°00′00″E
- Country: New Zealand
- Region: Wellington Region
- Territorial authority: Upper Hutt
- Electorates: Kapiti; Te Tai Hauāuru (Māori)

Government
  - Territorial Authority: Upper Hutt City Council
  - Regional council: Greater Wellington Regional Council
  - Mayor of Upper Hutt: Peri Zee
  - Kapiti MP: Tim Costley
  - Te Tai Hauāuru MP: Debbie Ngarewa-Packer

Area
  - Total: 23.91 km^{2} (9.23 sq mi)

Population (2023 census)
  - Total: 228
  - Density: 9.54/km^{2} (24.7/sq mi)

Moonshine Valley or Moonshine is a suburb of Upper Hutt in the lower (southern) North Island of New Zealand. It comprises a rural area located northwest of urban Upper Hutt and south of Paekākāriki. It is a rural locality and thinly populated valley with a population of around 228 in the Wellington Region of New Zealand, centred on the Moonshine Hill Road which leaves State Highway 58 near Judgeford and goes over the Tararua Range to the Riverstone Terraces suburbs and then joins River Road, Upper Hutt. It is mostly in Upper Hutt, but part is in Porirua.

BRANZ, the Building Research Association of New Zealand headquarters is at the beginning of Moonshine Road near Judgeford.

Whisky Way is a road running off Moonshine Valley Road.

== History ==
The valley was settled in the 1860s by settlers including Ephraim Greenwood who had a sawmill and farm.

In World War II there was a camp for the US Marines with a recreation hall and a vehicle servicing depot in the Moonshine Valley.

== Demographics ==
The part of Moonshine Valley in Upper Hutt covers 23.91 km^{2} (9.23 sq mi), and is part of the much larger Akatarawa statistical area.

Historical population
Year	Pop.	±% p.a.
2006	204	—
2013	201	−0.21%
2018	210	+0.88%
2023	228	+1.66%

Moonshine Valley had a population of 228 in the 2023 New Zealand census, an increase of 18 people (8.6%) since the 2018 census, and an increase of 27 people (13.4%) since the 2013 census. There were 111 males, 114 females, and 3 people of other genders in 75 dwellings. 3.9% of people identified as LGBTIQ+. The median age was 48.7 years (compared with 38.1 years nationally). There were 30 people (13.2%) aged under 15 years, 36 (15.8%) aged 15 to 29, 123 (53.9%) aged 30 to 64, and 39 (17.1%) aged 65 or older.

People could identify as more than one ethnicity. The results were 96.1% European (Pākehā), 6.6% Māori, 1.3% Asian, and 2.6% other, which includes people giving their ethnicity as "New Zealander". English was spoken by 98.7%, Māori by 2.6%, and other languages by 6.6%. New Zealand Sign Language was known by 1.3%. The percentage of people born overseas was 28.9, compared with 28.8% nationally.

Religious affiliations were 26.3% Christian, 1.3% Buddhist, 1.3% New Age, and 1.3% other religions. People who answered that they had no religion were 61.8%, and 6.6% of people did not answer the census question.

Of those at least 15 years old, 63 (31.8%) people had a bachelor's or higher degree, 108 (54.5%) had a post-high school certificate or diploma, and 30 (15.2%) people exclusively held high school qualifications. The median income was $54,100, compared with $41,500 nationally. 48 people (24.2%) earned over $100,000 compared to 12.1% nationally. The employment status of those at least 15 was 120 (60.6%) full-time and 39 (19.7%) part-time.
