= Moonglow =

Moonglow may refer to:

== Music ==
- Moonglow (Avantasia album), 2019
- Moonglow, an album by Bucky Pizzarelli and Frank Vignola, 2005
- Moonglow (Pat Boone album), 1960
- Moonglow (Tatsuro Yamashita album), 1979
- "Moonglow", a song from Moonglow/This Bitter Earth by Venetian Snares, 2004
- "Moonglow" (song), by Will Hudson and Irving Mills, 1933
- "The Theme for Moonglow", a 2008 song by Windsor Airlift, originally by Dolphin Park
- The Moonglows, an American R&B and doo-wop group
- Moonglow Records, an American record label

== Other ==
- Moonlight, mostly sunlight reflected from the parts of the Moon's surface
- Moonglow (comics), a fictional character in the Marvel Comics universe
- Moonglow (novel), a 2016 novel by Michael Chabon
