= Moonlighting =

Moonlighting may refer to:

- Side job, a job taken in addition to one's primary employment

== Entertainment ==
- Moonlighting (film), a 1982 drama film by Jerzy Skolimowski
- Moonlighting (TV series), 1985–1989 American television series, starring Bruce Willis and Cybill Shepherd
  - "Moonlighting" (theme song), from the above TV series, performed by Al Jarreau
  - Moonlighting (soundtrack), the soundtrack to the television series
- "Moonlighting" (NCIS), a television episode
- "Moonlighting" (The Upper Hand), a 1995 television episode
- Moonlighting (The Rippingtons album), 1986
- Moonlighting: Live at the Ash Grove, an album by Van Dyke Parks, 1998
- Moonlighting: The Anthology, an album by Roger Daltrey, 2005
- "Moonlighting" (Leo Sayer song), 1975

== See also ==
- Protein moonlighting, or gene sharing, a phenomenon by which a protein can perform more than one function
- Unreported employment, sometimes referred to as "moonlighting"
- Moonlight (disambiguation)
- Moonlighter (disambiguation)
