= Midheaven (album) =

- External slipcase cover

Studio album by The Human Abstract
- Released: August 19, 2008
- Recorded: @ Red Bull Studios, Santa Monica, California / Johnny Yuma Recording / Henson Recording Studios, Hollywood, California
- Genres: Progressive metal; metalcore; mathcore
- Length: 43:45
- Label: Hopeless
- Producers: Leonard Simone, Jesse E. String

The Human Abstract chronology
Nocturne (2006)	Midheaven (2008)	Digital Veil (2011)

Professional ratings
Review scores
Source	Rating
AbsolutePunk	(80%)
Alternative Press	3.5/5 stars
Exclaim!	Mixed
411mania	8.5/10 stars

Midheaven is the second album by metal band The Human Abstract. It was released on August 19, 2008 through Hopeless Records. This is the band's last release with vocalist Ells, only album with keyboardist Sean Leonard, and only album to not feature guitarist A. J. Minette.

The album was originally recorded with producer Toby Wright, however the band "wiped off all credits" of his effort. The record was later re-worked and finished by Leonard Simone and Jesse E. String.

A studio journal has been posted on YouTube documenting the progress of Midheaven. The studio journal was shot and edited by Nick Guillen.

Four video teasers have been made by the band's director Michael Grodner (The Human Abstract, Planes Mistaken For Stars, The Briggs, Chiodos) for the band's first music video from Midheaven, "Procession of the Fates". The video was shot months before the song was written and recorded to generate the overall concept of the entire record.

The album debuted at #163 on The Billboard Top 200 with first week sales of 4,100.

== Sound and theme ==
Before recording the album, The Human Abstract departed from its founding member A.J. Minette, who wished to pursue other musical goals outside of metal. Minette was replaced by Andrew Tapley, and at this time the band had also adopted a new member, Sean Leonard, playing various keyboard instruments. These changes allowed a change in musical style for the band. The production of the album also saw a change while recording. Producer Toby Wright (Korn, Slayer, Alice in Chains) had initially been brought in to work on the record, however Wright "was wiped off of all the credits" due to musical differences, and the band finished the album with Leonard Simone, Jesse E. String co-producing the album.

After the new band line up was set, Nathan Ells reassured fans that, "The Human Abstract has always been, and will continue to be, a heavy band." However, Midheaven departs from the hardcore sound found on The Human Abstract's debut release Nocturne. Although the album does feature heavy parts, it focuses more on the alternative and progressive side. It also contains more singing than screaming when compared to Nocturne. One reviewer said, "You definitely need to have an open mind going into Midheaven. Don't expect Nocturne Pt. 2; you will be sorely disappointed if you do."

Midheaven is a concept album that tells the story of one unnamed man. The Human Abstract tried to create a story that is "something with a storyline that tells real stories about real people, something that tells a story that lies so deeply within the human cycle of being, that it has always been, and may always be within the recesses of our conscious thought." To effectively create the concept the band created a theme, unique to each song, that tied into the overall concept. From there the band would, "try to capture the mood musically for what each theme represents." Ells stated that the story "follows a full cycle of man while he makes his ascent and discoveries and is eventually brought down by his lust of conquest and greed."

The cover art theme and style is heavily influenced by Robert Parke-Harrison. The album artwork was done by original bassist Kenny Arehart.

== Track listing ==
All tracks are written by Nathan Ells, Sean Leonard, Dean Herrera, and Brett Powell, except where noted.

No.	Title	Writer(s)	Length
1.	"A Violent Strike"		6:41
2.	"Procession of the Fates"		4:12
3.	"Breathing Life Into Devices"	Andrew Tapley, Ells, Leonard, Herrera, Powell	5:11
4.	"This World Is a Tomb"		3:57
5.	"Metanoia"	Kenny Arehart, Ells, Leonard, Herrera, Powell, Tapley	3:18
6.	"The Path"		3:03
7.	"Echoes of the Spirit"		4:31
8.	"Calm in the Chaos"		2:46
9.	"Counting Down the Days"	Ells, Leonard, Herrera, Powell, Tapley	5:48
10.	"A Dead World at Sunrise" (feat. L. Shankar)		4:18
Total length:			43:45

=== Promotional EP listing ===
Midheaven promotional EP cover.

A limited promotional EP was released exclusively through Hot Topic stores across the US before the release of Midheaven. The EP also contains a remix of the music video for "Vela, Together We Await the Storm" from The Human Abstract's previous release, Nocturne.

No.	Title	Length
1.	"Counting Down the Days"	5:48
2.	"Echoes of the Spirit"	4:31
3.	"Vela, Together We Await the Storm" (Tim Lambesis remix)	4:06

== Music videos ==
Two music videos have been released for the songs "Procession of the Fates" and "Counting Down the Days".

The video for "Processions of the Fates" starts with slogans saying "Doomed to repeat our history" and "What will bravery do for us now?". It then goes on to scenes of bombs being dropped for a minute, before turning on a man who is creating things in a dark room. About halfway through the video we see him plant a small cutting in a field, and near the end of the video we see a shot of the field filled with lightbulbs, a shot very similar to the one on the cover of Midheaven.

The video for "Counting Down the Days" features shots of the band, together with scenes shot in stop motion of strange creatures, attempting to build a doomsday device.

== Personnel ==
The Human Abstract

- Nathan Ells – vocals
- Dean Herrera – guitar, bass (on tracks 3 and 5)
- Andrew Tapley – guitar
- Brett Powell – drums, percussion
- Sean Leonard – keyboards, piano, mellotron

Additional musicians

- Sean Hurley – bass
- L. Shankar – guest vocals (on track 10)
- Kenny Arehart - songwriter (on track 5)

Production

- Jesse E. String – recording, producing, mixing
- Nicholas Essig – recording
- Leonard Simone – producing
- Michael Verdick – mastering

Art

- Kenny Arehart – layout & design
- Taylor Foiles – photography
- Rob Zabrecky – actor
