= Corelia =

American heavy metal band

- Origin: San Diego, California, United States
- Genres: Progressive metal; djent; progressive metalcore
- Years active: 2010–2015, 2020
- Label: Unsigned
- Past members: Ryan Devlin; Clayton Pratt; Ryan Borrell; Adrian Alperstein; Chris Dower

Corelia was an American heavy metal band from San Diego, California, United States. The band was managed by Outerloop Management until October 2016 and have released two EPs, Nostalgia (2011), and Nostalgia (Instrumentals and Extras) (2012).

The band has been embroiled in controversy. In 2015, Corelia raised over $30,000 via crowdfunding platform Indiegogo in 2015. Since they produced no updates from late 2016 to mid 2020, Corelia was long believed to be disbanded, leaving the many contributors to their crowdfunding campaign disgruntled.

On April 11, 2020, an anonymous individual claiming to be a former member of the band (presumed to be Chris Dower), created a separate Facebook page titled "Corelias", and announced that he had a copy of the unreleased album and attempted to release it to the public on April 20, without the formal authorization of the remaining band members. Though it was revealed to be a hoax by someone unrelated to the band, Corelia initially believed it to be credible and made their first public comment in nearly four years. On April 21, the remaining band members released a second statement apologizing for the years of silence. They confirmed an unnamed band member had indeed quit, and promised they will do whatever they can to release whatever material they have finished, as well as compensate anyone who contributed to their crowdfunding campaign.

On May 8, 2020, Corelia had updated their Indiegogo stating that they intend to give all contributors a link to the album to download on May 11, 2020.

== History ==
=== Formation and Nostalgia releases (2010–2012) ===
Corelia formed in San Diego, California in 2010 by guitarist Chris Dower and drummer Clayton Pratt. Bassist Adrian Alperstein was added to the lineup a few months after the band’s original formation, and in early 2010 the band completed their lineup with vocalist Ryan Devlin and guitarist Ryan Borrell. Throughout this process of finding band members, the band released several demos online. In September 2011, the band put out their debut release titled Nostalgia. Nostalgia received a 4.5/Superb rating via Sputnik Music with an overall review summary by Tim Perez, "painstakingly refined over the years, the work of Corelia finally sees fruition in the form of a fantastic EP." The track entitled “Treetops” features guest vocals from original vocalist of Corelia and current vocalist of Periphery, Spencer Sotelo. Vocalist Ryan Devlin filled in for The Human Abstract on vocals on the "Frak The Gods Tour" with Periphery (US) and Suicide Silence (EU) in 2011. Corelia was endorsed by Ernie Ball Music Man, Warwick, Toontrack, and Venus Fallen.

=== "New Wilderness" (2013–2020) ===
The band began writing in early 2013. Corelia played a new song entitled "Ages Ago" in at Gallery 127 in El Paso, Texas on February 20, 2013. The track comes in at under three minutes, which makes it their shortest song yet. Corelia teamed up with Revolver Magazine to debut their new music video, “Red Sky Harbor,” which was shot live at East West Studios in West Hollywood, California. In early 2013, Corelia provided direct support to Misery Signals on their US tour. and planned to release their debut LP in the fall of 2013, the follow-up to their EP, Nostalgia. On January 21, 2015, Corelia created an Indiegogo.com campaign for their debut album, which received almost double its goal in a month. Along with releasing the campaign, they also announced that the album will be a 90 minute long, double disc album. The campaign promised a release date within 2015, but after years of silence was unofficially released in May 2020.

== Tours ==
- Participated in a United States tour providing direct support to Misery Signals (January – February 2013)
- Participated in a United States tour with Seeker and I Omega (February 2013)

== Band members ==
Current members

- Ryan Devlin - vocals (2010–present)
- Clayton Pratt - drums, percussion (2010–present)

Previous members

- Spencer Sotelo - vocals (2009)
- Ryan Borrell - guitar (2010–2014)
- Adrian Alperstein - bass (2010–2014)
- Chris Dower - guitar (2010–2015)

== Discography ==
=== EPs ===
- Nostalgia (self-released, 2011)
- Nostalgia (Instrumentals and Extras) (self-released, 2012)

=== Albums ===
- New Wilderness (self-released, 2020)

=== Singles ===
- "Glass Faces" (Instrumental)
- "Red Sky Harbor" (Instrumental)
- "Aviation" (Instrumental)
- "Glass Faces" (Demo)
- "Aviation" (Demo)
- "The Sound of Glaciers Moving"

== Music videos ==
Year	Song	Director
2012	"The Sound of Glaciers Moving"	Jeff Thomas
2013	"Red Sky Harbor"	
