= Moonlight Sonata (disambiguation) =

Moonlight Sonata is the popular name for the Piano Sonata No. 14 in C-sharp minor "Quasi una fantasia", Op. 27, No. 2 by Ludwig van Beethoven.

Moonlight Sonata may also refer to:

- Moonlight Sonata (EP), a 2012 EP from American rock band The Human Abstract
- Moonlight Sonata (film), a 1937 British film
- The Moonlight Sonata (film), a 1988 Finnish film
- Moonlight Sonata: Deafness in Three Movements, a 2019 documentary film directed by Irene Taylor Brodsky
- Operation Moonlight Sonata, a code name for the Coventry Blitz
