= Judgeford =

- Suburb
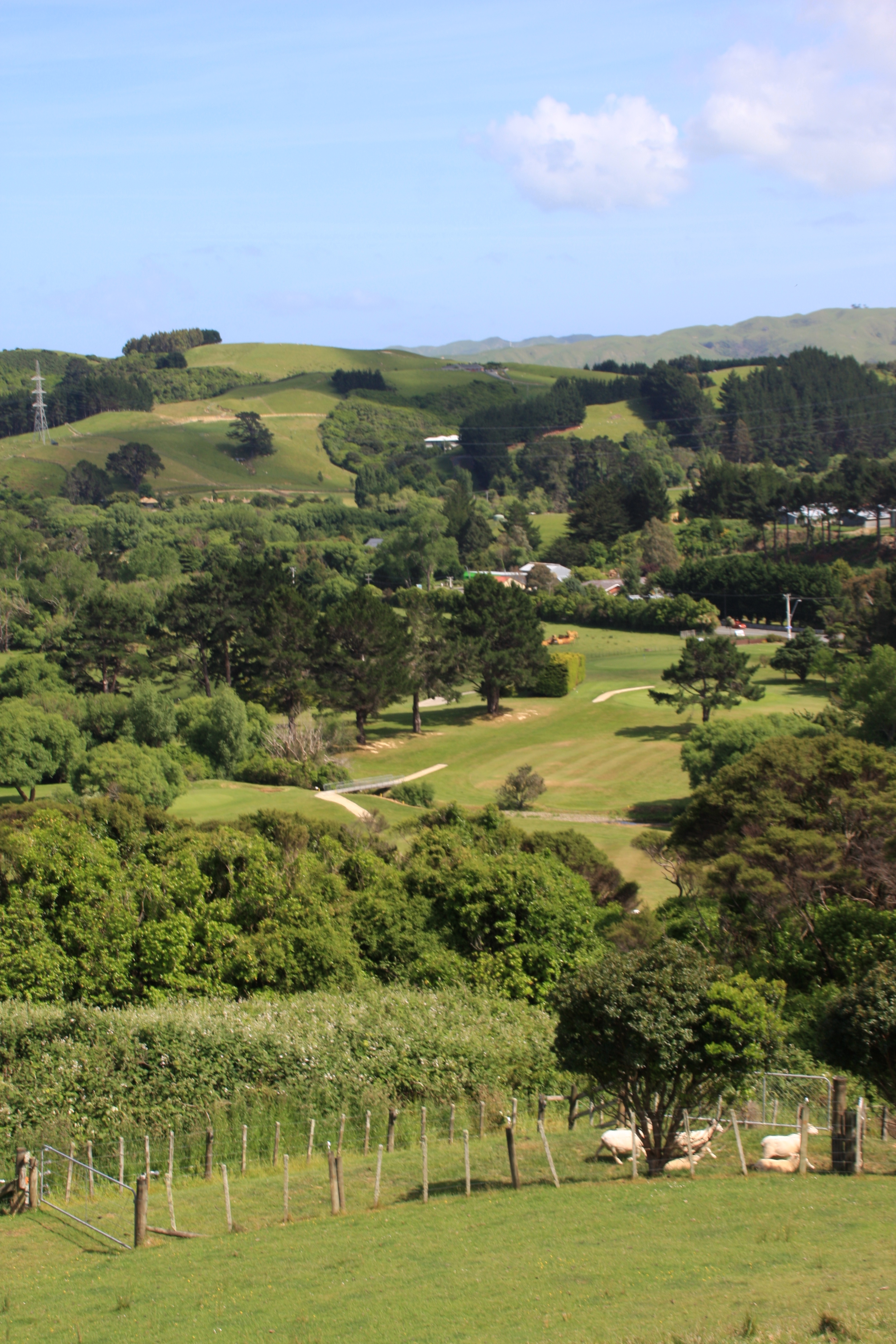
- The rural landscape of Judgeford, with the golf course visible.
- Interactive map of Judgeford
- Coordinates: 41°07′S 174°56′E
- Country: New Zealand
- City: Porirua
- Local authority: Porirua City Council
- Electoral ward: Pāuatahanui General Ward; Parirua Māori Ward
- Established: 1850s

Area
  - Land: 38.34 ha (94.7 acres)

Population (2023 census)
  - Total: 528
  - Density: 1,380/km^{2} (3,570/sq mi)

Paekākāriki Hill	Pāuatahanui	Moonshine Valley
Whitby	Judgeford	Moonshine Valley
Belmont	Belmont	Haywards

Judgeford is a suburb of Porirua in the Wellington Region of New Zealand. The main buildings are a dog boarding business named Gone to the Dogs Kennels & Cattery, Judgeford golf course, some light industrial and other businesses, and houses. The closest school is Pāuatahanui School. There is a nearby church called Saint Albans Church, but it is in Pāuatahanui.

The headquarters of BRANZ, the Building Research Association of New Zealand, is at the beginning of Moonshine Road near Judgeford.

== History ==
In the 1850s, immigrants from England came to Judgeford to settle land obtained from Māori by the Wellington Company. Most people farmed, and there were some sawmills. The area was originally called the Small Farms Settlement.

The Judgeford School, sometimes called the Small Farms School, opened on 6 October 1879, with 29 children taught by Miss Georgina Chatwin. When it reopened after the 1934 summer holidays there were only 8 children, and the school closed on 10 May 1935 with the remaining pupils following other children in the area to the Pāuatahanui School.

In 1883, people started to call the suburb Judgeford because of an early settler called Alfred Judge who had built his house close to a river. Hence the name Judge's Ford, which soon evolved into Judgeford.

In the 1890s, the Abbott and Galloway families established a cooperative dairy business at the junction of Flightys Road and the Pāuatahanui-Haywards Road. It was primarily a creamery where the milk was separated and the cream sent elsewhere to make butter or cheese, and it operated for about 15 years until it burnt down in 1907.

In World War II the US Marines had four camps in the Pāuatahanui area; the Judgeford camp accommodated 3,755 men.

== Demographics ==
Judgeford covers 38.34 km^{2} (14.80 sq mi). It is part of the larger Pāuatahanui statistical area.

Historical population
Year	Pop.	±% p.a.
2006	411	—
2013	483	+2.33%
2018	507	+0.97%
2023	528	+0.82%

Judgeford had a population of 528 in the 2023 New Zealand census, an increase of 21 people (4.1%) since the 2018 census, and an increase of 45 people (9.3%) since the 2013 census. There were 279 males, 249 females, and 3 people of other genders in 168 dwellings. 2.8% of people identified as LGBTIQ+. There were 93 people (17.6%) aged under 15 years, 96 (18.2%) aged 15 to 29, 273 (51.7%) aged 30 to 64, and 69 (13.1%) aged 65 or older.

People could identify as more than one ethnicity. The results were 92.0% European (Pākehā); 11.4% Māori; 1.7% Pasifika; 5.7% Asian; 0.6% Middle Eastern, Latin American and African New Zealanders (MELAA); and 3.4% other, which includes people giving their ethnicity as "New Zealander". English was spoken by 97.7%, Māori by 1.7%, Samoan by 0.6%, and other languages by 8.0%. No language could be spoken by 2.3% (e.g. too young to talk). The percentage of people born overseas was 22.7, compared with 28.8% nationally.

Religious affiliations were 27.8% Christian, 0.6% Buddhist, 0.6% New Age, and 0.6% other religions. People who answered that they had no religion were 64.2%, and 7.4% of people did not answer the census question.

Of those at least 15 years old, 141 (32.4%) people had a bachelor's or higher degree, 222 (51.0%) had a post-high school certificate or diploma, and 60 (13.8%) people exclusively held high school qualifications. 132 people (30.3%) earned over $100,000 compared to 12.1% nationally. The employment status of those at least 15 was 258 (59.3%) full-time, 63 (14.5%) part-time, and 6 (1.4%) unemployed.
