= Clair de Lune (disambiguation) =

Clair de Lune is French for "Moonlight". It may refer to:

== Literature ==
- "Clair de lune" (poem), a poem by Paul Verlaine published in the 1869 collection Fêtes galantes
- Clair de Lune, an 1884 short story collection by Guy de Maupassant
- Clair de lune, a 1921 play by Blanche Oelrichs, filmed in 1932
- Claire de Lune, a 1962 novel by Pierre La Mure
- "Claire de Lune", a short story by Steven Millhauser from the 1998 short story collection The Knife Thrower and Other Stories

== Music ==
=== Classical music ===
- "Clair de lune" (Debussy), a piano piece by Claude Debussy, third movement of his Suite bergamasque, L. 75 (1905), inspired by the Verlaine poem
- "Clair de lune" (Fauré), setting of the Paul Verlaine poem by Fauré, from his Two Songs, Op. 46 (1887)
- Clairs de lune, a set of four piano pieces, each titled "Clair de Lune", by Abel Decaux (1907)

=== Contemporary popular music ===
- "Clair de Lune" (Flight Facilities song), 2012
- "Clair de Lune", a 2015 song by Little Green Cars
- "Clair de Lune", from The Epic by Kamasi Washington

== Other uses ==
- Claire de Lune (typeface), a typeface by Debriey

== See also ==
- "Au clair de la lune", a French folk song
- Au clair de la lune (film), a 1983 Canadian film directed by Forcier
