= Mr. Moonlight =

Mr. Moonlight may refer to:

- "Mr. Moonlight" (song), a 1962 song written by Roy Lee Johnson, notably covered by The Beatles
- Mr. Moonlight (album), a 1994 album by Foreigner
- "Mr. Moonlight (Ai no Big Band)", a 2001 song by Morning Musume
