= Moonshiner =

Moonshiner(s) or The Moonshiner(s) may refer to:

- Moonshiner, one who makes moonshine, illegal distilled alcohol
- "The Moonshiner", a traditional folk song
- The Moonshiner (film), a 1904 American short silent action film
- Salaviinanpolttajat (The Moonshiners), a 1907 Finnish film directed by Louis Sparre and Teuvo Puro
- The Moonshiners (1916 film), an American short film directed by Fatty Arbuckle
- Moonshiners (TV series), an American docudrama series, beginning in 2011
