= Nocturne (The Human Abstract album) =

Studio album by The Human Abstract
- Released: August 22, 2006
- Recorded: February 2006
- Studios: The Basement Studio, Rural Hall, North Carolina / Trax East, South River, New Jersey
- Genres: Progressive metal; metalcore; post-hardcore
- Length: 46:35
- Label: Hopeless
- Producers: Jamie King; The Human Abstract

The Human Abstract chronology
The Human Abstract (2005)	Nocturne (2006)	Midheaven (2008)

Professional ratings
Review scores
Source	Rating
Absolute Punk	(86%)
AllMusic	3/5 stars
Blabbermouth	7.5/10
Lambgoat	7/10
Punk News	2.5/5 stars

Nocturne is the debut studio album by American metal band The Human Abstract. It was recorded at The Basement in Rural Hall, North Carolina and Trax East in South River, New Jersey. On the band's MySpace page, as well as in the Metal=Life compilation CD, the last 30 or so seconds of "Desiderata" are included as part of the intro to "Vela, Together We Await the Storm". Music videos were made for "Crossing the Rubicon" (directed by Darren Doane) and "Vela, Together We Await the Storm" (directed by Michael Grodner). Nocturne has sold roughly 40,000 units in the USA since its release in August 2006.

== Track listing ==
All lyrics are written by Nathan Ells; all music is composed by A.J. Minette and Dean Herrera.

No.	Title	Length
1.	"Harbinger"	4:31
2.	"Self Portraits of the Instincts"	3:24
3.	"Nocturne"	3:29
4.	"Crossing the Rubicon"	5:06
5.	"Sotto Voce" (instrumental)	1:34
6.	"Mea Culpa"	3:32
7.	"Movement from Discord"	4:07
8.	"Channel Detritus"	5:27
9.	"Polaris"	4:23
10.	"Echelons to Molotovs"	2:36
11.	"Desiderata" (instrumental)	3:54
12.	"Vela, Together We Await the Storm"	4:36
Total length:		46:35

== Personnel ==
The Human Abstract

- Nathan Ells – vocals, lyrics
- A.J. Minette – guitar, piano
- Dean Herrera – guitar
- Kenny Arehart – bass
- Brett Powell – drums

Additional

- Jamie King – producer, engineer
- Eric Rachel – mixing
- Alan Douches – mastering
- Sons of Nero – artwork

== In popular culture ==
- An 8-bit remix of "Crossing the Rubicon" is used as the theme song for the Angry Joe Show, an internet video game review series hosted by Joe Vargas.
