= Selenoplexia =

Obsolete category of medical conditions

Selenoplexia (also called selenoplegia, selenoplege, and moonstroke), from the Greek words selene, 'the moon', and plexis, 'stroke'), medical category that included apoplectic, a morbid, states or diseased conditions supposed to be caused by the rays of the moon. A Dictionary of Medical Science (1895), in its discussion of the conditions of sunstroke, states that the "morbid phenomena observable after death are generally those of nervous exhaustion, neuroparalysis. Like effects have also been ascribed to the moon, selenoplexia, selenoplege, moonstroke; and to the stars, starstroke."
