= Moonlight Sonata (EP) =

EP by The Human Abstract
- Released: February 14, 2012
- Recorded: 2010
- Length: 14:30
- Label: E1
- Producer: Will Putney

The Human Abstract chronology
Digital Veil (2011)	Moonlight Sonata (2012)

Moonlight Sonata is the 2nd EP and the final release from American progressive metal band The Human Abstract. The EP was released on February 14, 2012, and is a cover of all three parts of Ludwig van Beethoven's "Moonlight Sonata".

== Production ==
Guitars for the album were recorded by Dean Herrera with production from Will Putney.

== Critical reception ==
The ensemble likened the song to “Dean Shreds Beethoven” while Axl Rosenberg of MetalSucks described the EP as "the best two bucks you'll ever spend today". Rosenberg goes on to say that the band added heavy metal to the song, and that the song purports that there exists "distinct and definite connection between classical music and metal".

== Track listing ==
No.	Title	Length
1.	"Movement 1"	5:21
2.	"Movement 2"	2:07
3.	"Movement 3"	7:02
Total length:		14:30

== Personnel ==
The Human Abstract

- Dean Herrera – guitars
- Henry Selva – bass
- Brett Powell – drums

Production

- Will Putney
