= Building Research Association of New Zealand =

Construction research organisation in New Zealand

The Building Research Association of New Zealand (BRANZ) is a research association in New Zealand, focusing on improving New Zealand's building system performance.

== History ==
BRANZ started out as an industry-funded research library in the 1950s, the Building Research Bureau. In the late 1960s the New Zealand government passed legislation to create the building research levy, which allowed the establishment of the research association BRANZ in 1970.

== Activities ==
BRANZ commissions research, and provides product testing, assurance and consultancy services. It also publishes the bi-monthly industry magazine Build. The association is based in Judgeford, Porirua.
