= Moonlight =

Light that reaches Earth from the Moon

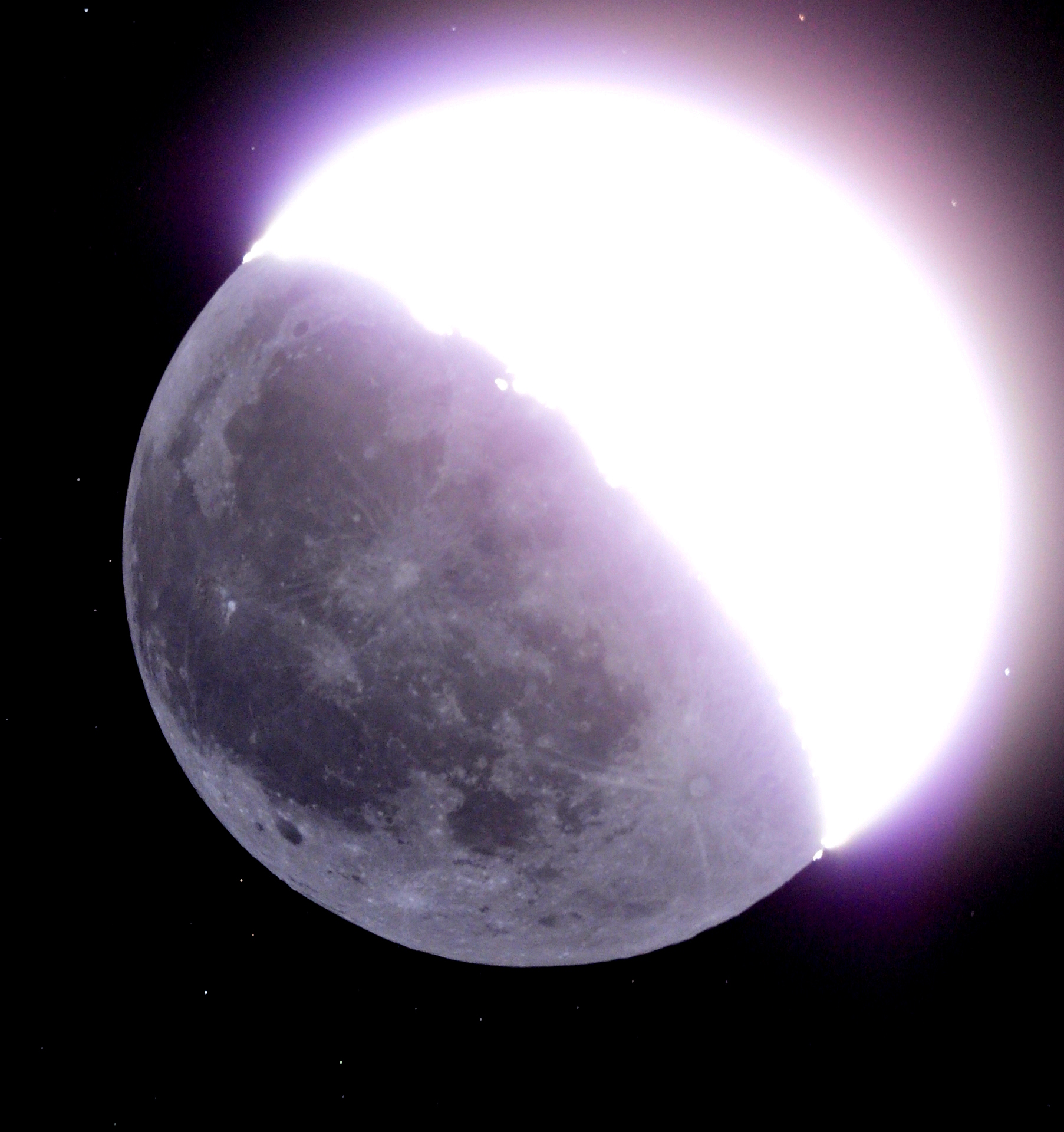
Earthlight illuminates the dim side of the Moon, while direct sunlight illuminates the bright side.

Moonlight (or moonshine) is light from the surface of the Moon, consisting mostly of reflected sunlight, and some earthlight.

== History ==
The ancient Greek philosopher Anaxagoras noted that "the sun provides the moon with its brightness". Ancient Chinese polymath Zhang Heng concluded that the light of the Moon comes from the Sun. He writes in his treatise, The Spiritual Constitution of the Universe, that the Sun and Moon are "like fire and water", where the Sun "gives out light", and the Moon "reflects it".

Nyctalopia was called "moonblink" and thought to be caused by sleeping in moonlight in the tropics as late as the 19th century, but is actually caused by a deficiency in Vitamin A. Moonlight was historically thought to cause equine recurrent uveitis, which was called "moon blindness". Moonmilk, a soft white limestone precipitate found in caves, was thought to be caused by the rays of the Moon. Selenoplexia was a supposed medical condition caused by the rays of the Moon.

== Illumination ==
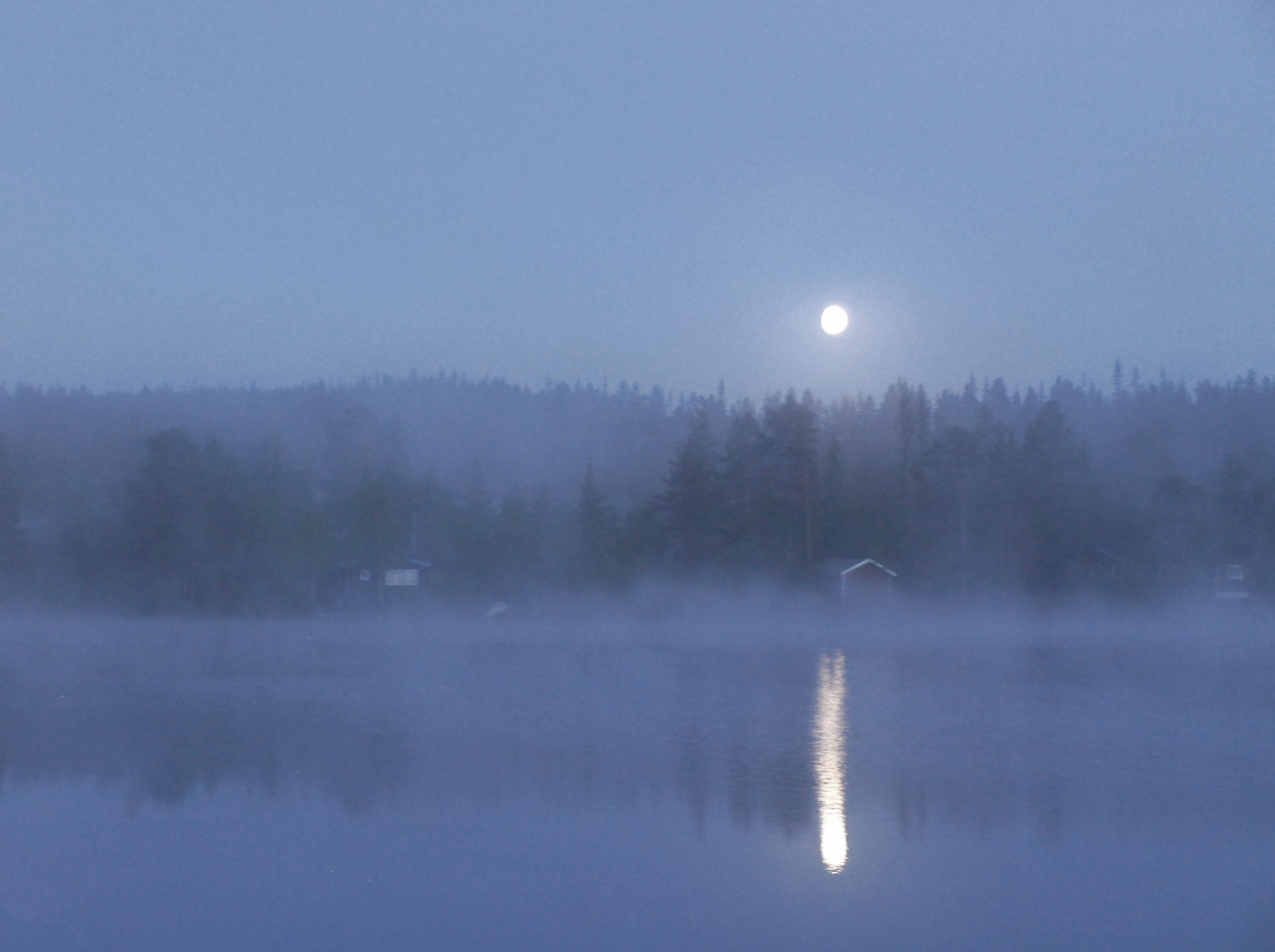
Moonlight illuminates a lake and surroundings.

The colour of moonlight appears bluish or silvery to the human eye compared to other, brighter light sources; however, the colour is actually an illusion due to the Purkinje effect: the spectrum has slightly more long-wavelength (red) light than daylight, but is almost the same as that of the sun. The intensity of moonlight varies greatly depending on the lunar phase, with the full moon typically providing about 0.05–0.1 lux illumination.

When a full Moon at perigee (a "supermoon") is viewed around upper culmination from the tropics, the illuminance can reach up to 0.32 lux. From Earth, the apparent magnitude of the full Moon is only about 1/380,000 that of the Sun, and the wavelength pattern is different. The Moon's Bond albedo averages 0.136, meaning only 13.6% of incident sunlight is reflected from the lunar surface. Moonlight takes approximately 1.26 seconds to reach Earth's surface. Moonlight is scattered by particles in the atmosphere of Earth, which increases the brightness of the night sky, and decreases contrast between dimmer stars and the background. For this reason, many astronomers usually avoid observing the sky around a full moon.

== Lunar eclipse ==
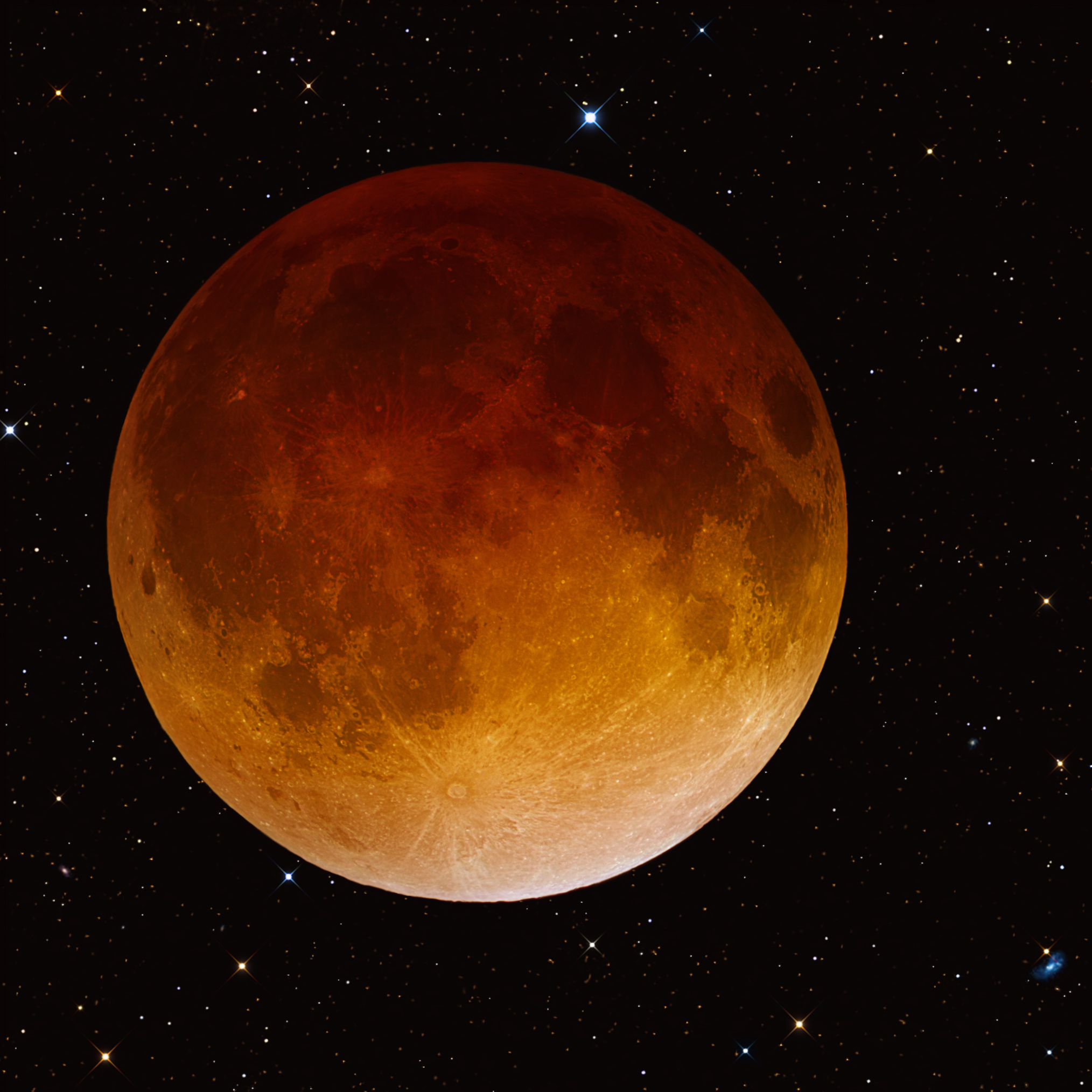
Composite image of the April 2014 total lunar eclipse from Charleston, West Virginia, United States.

A lunar eclipse is an astronomical event that occurs when the Moon moves into the Earth's shadow, causing the moonlight to be darkened. Such an alignment occurs during an eclipse season, approximately every six months, during the full moon phase, when the Moon's orbital plane is closest to the plane of the Earth's orbit.

When the Moon is totally eclipsed by the Earth (a "deep eclipse"), it takes on a reddish color that is caused by the planet when it completely blocks direct sunlight from reaching the Moon's surface, as the only light that is reflected from the lunar surface is what has been refracted by the Earth's atmosphere. This light appears reddish due to the Rayleigh scattering of blue light, the same reason sunrises and sunsets are more orange than during the day.

== Folklore ==
Moonlight was sometimes thought to have a harmful influence in folklore. For example, sleeping in the light of a full moon was believed to transform a person into a werewolf. The light of the Moon was thought to worsen the symptoms of lunatics, and to sleep in moonlight could make one blind, or mad.

== Art ==
Katie Paterson produced a display at The Guggenheim in 2008, entitled Light bulb to Simulate Moonlight, which consisted of 289 lightbulbs coated to produce a similar spectrum to the light of the full Moon.

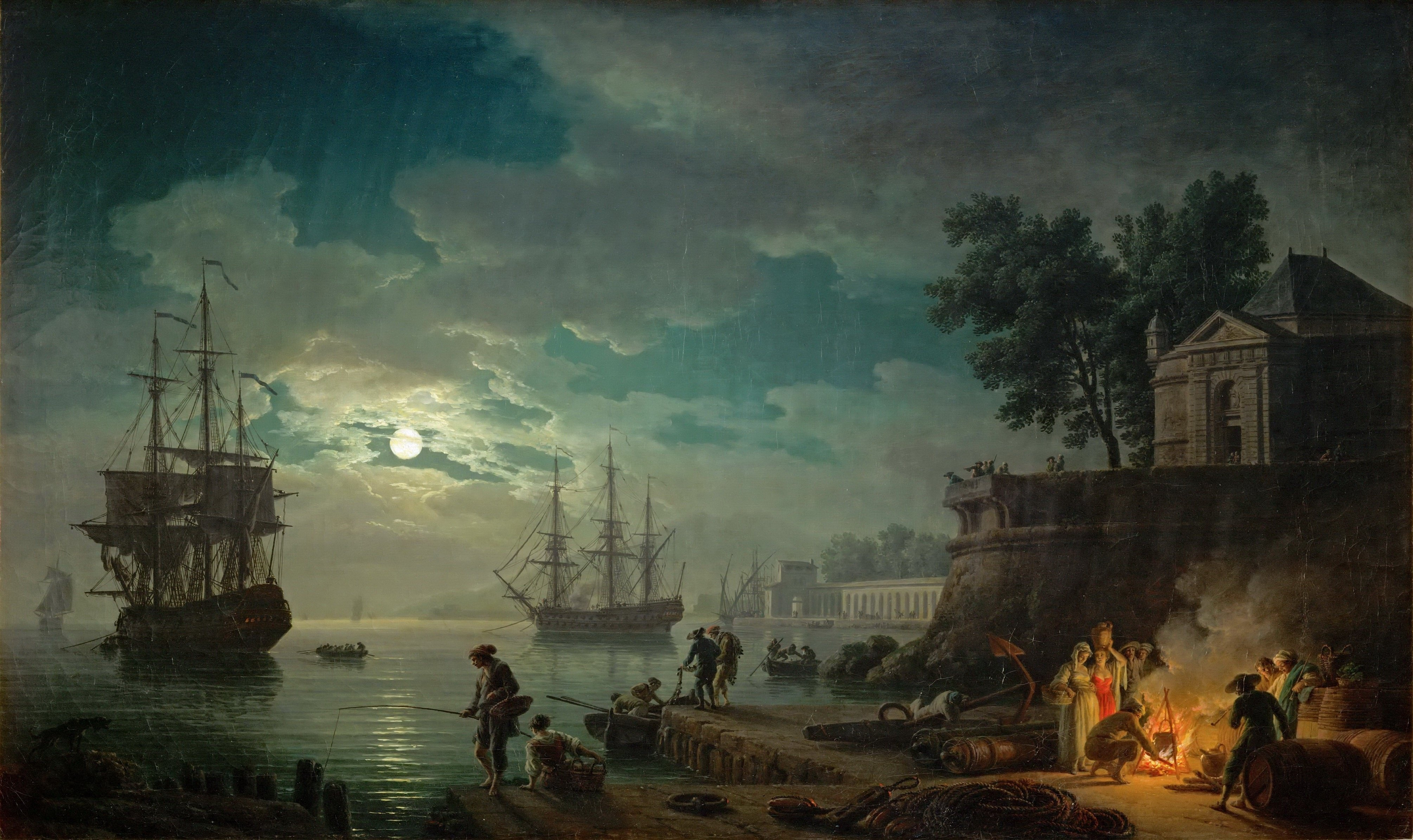
Seaport by Moonlight (1771) by Claude Joseph Vernet

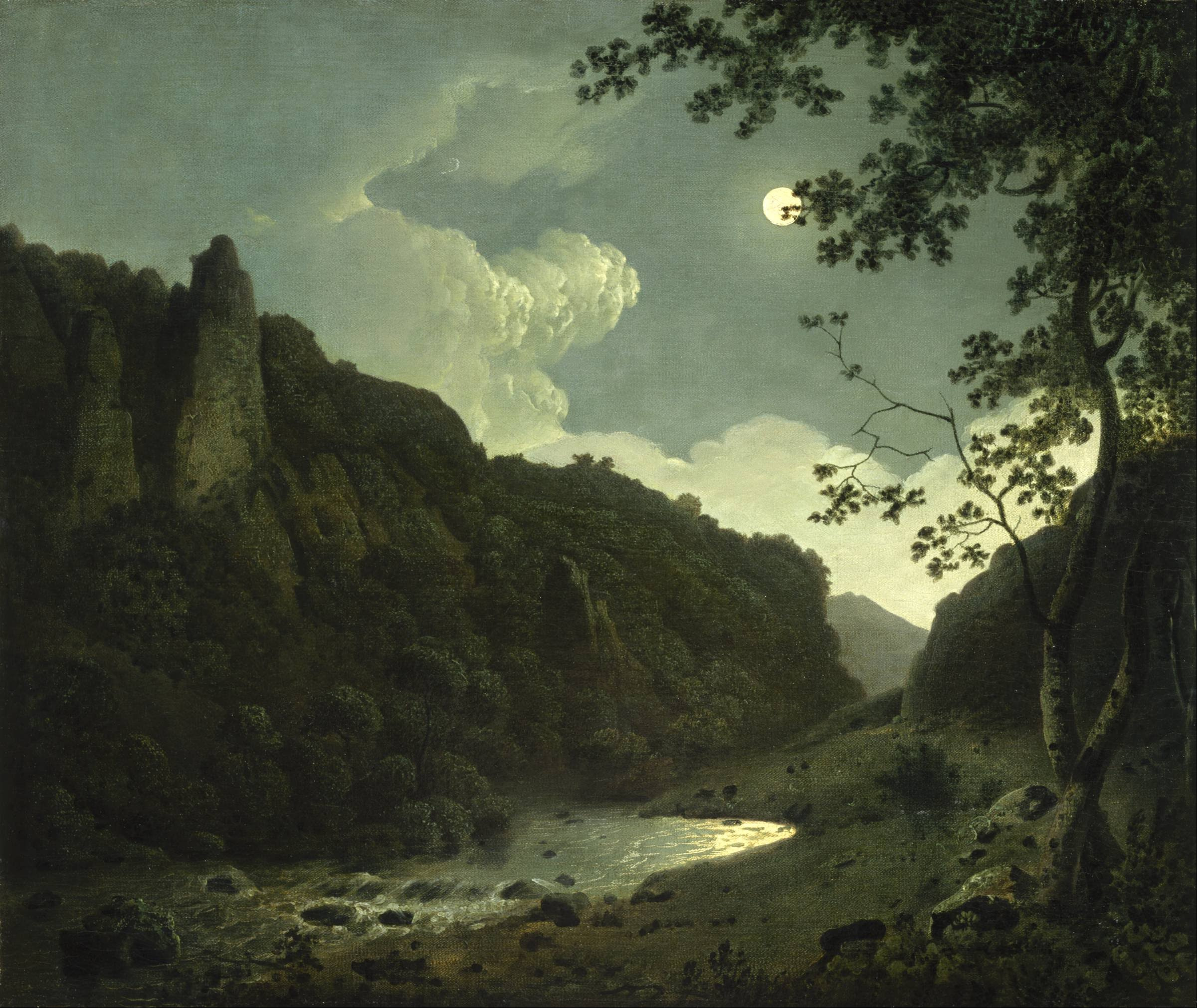
Dovedale by Moonlight (1784) by Joseph Wright of Derby

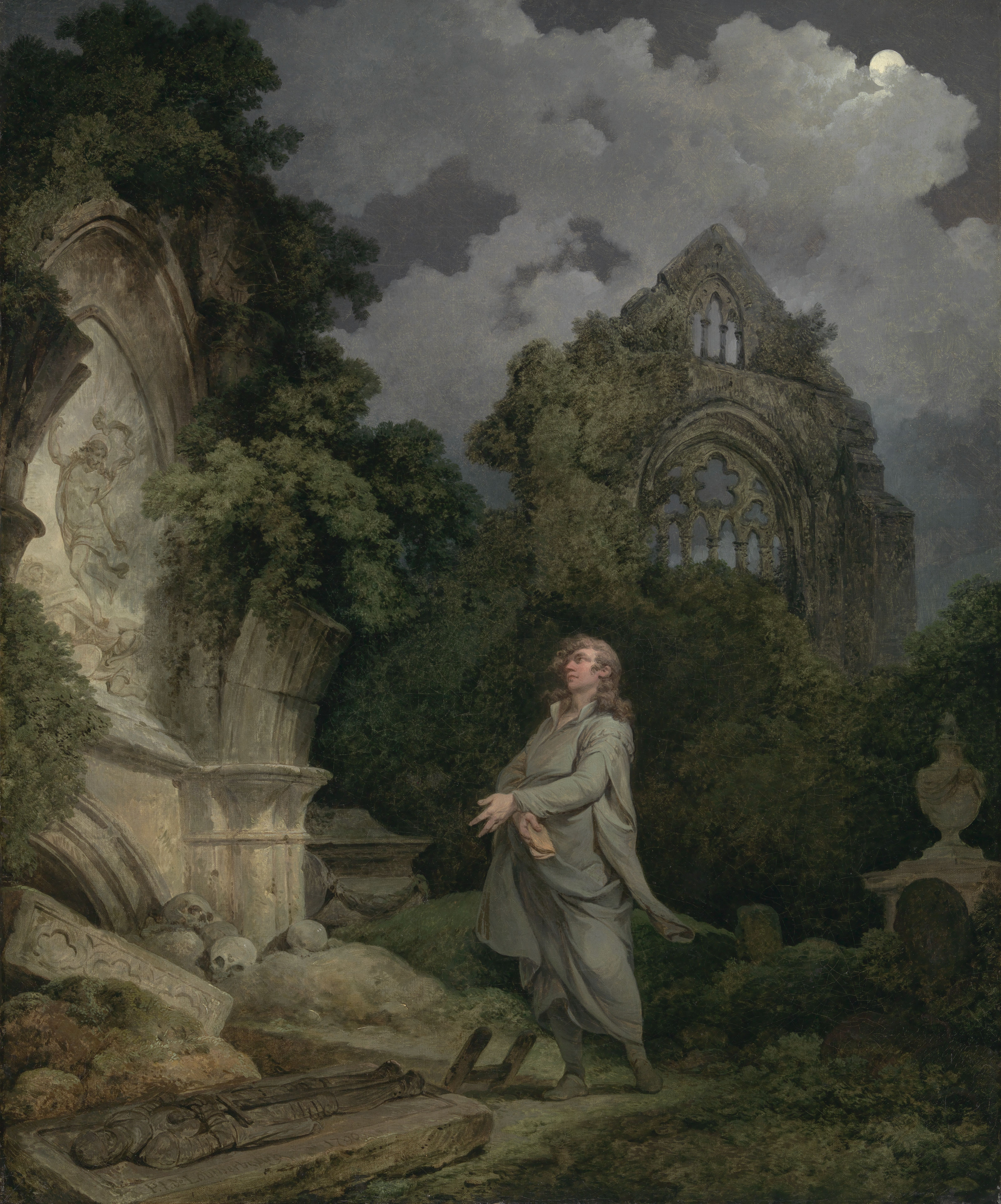
Visitor to a Moonlit Churchyard (1790) by Philip James de Loutherbourg

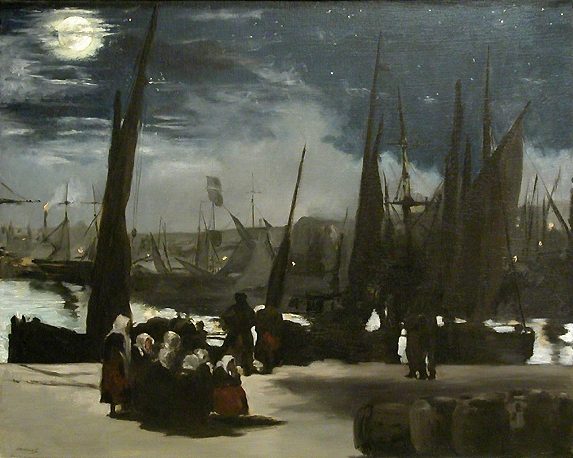
The Port of Boulogne by Moonlight (1869) by Édouard Manet

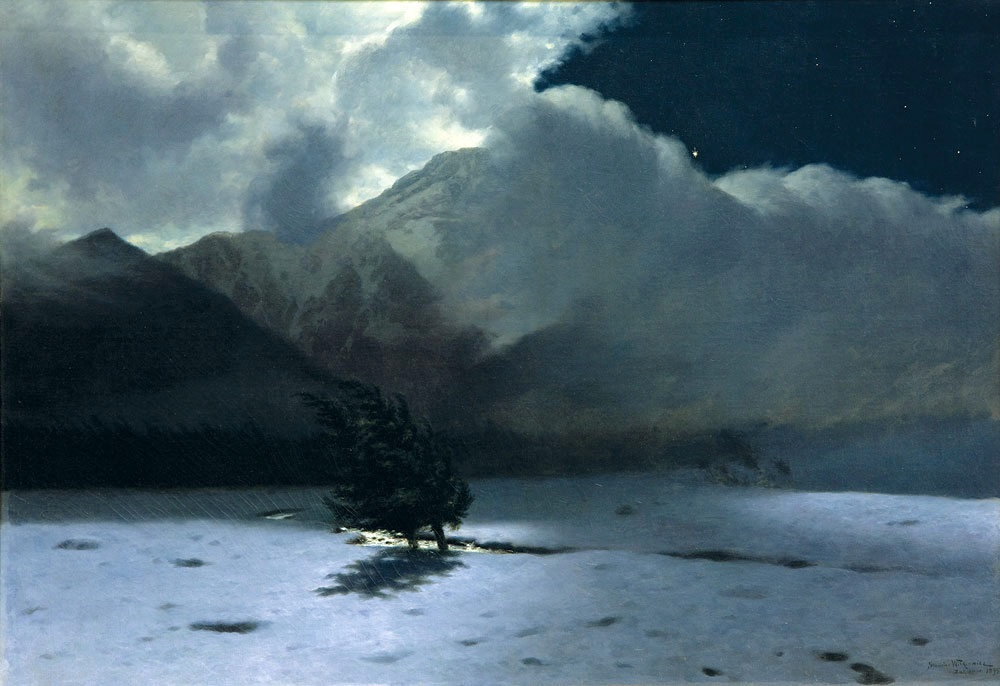
Halny (1895) by Stanisław Witkiewicz

== Gallery ==
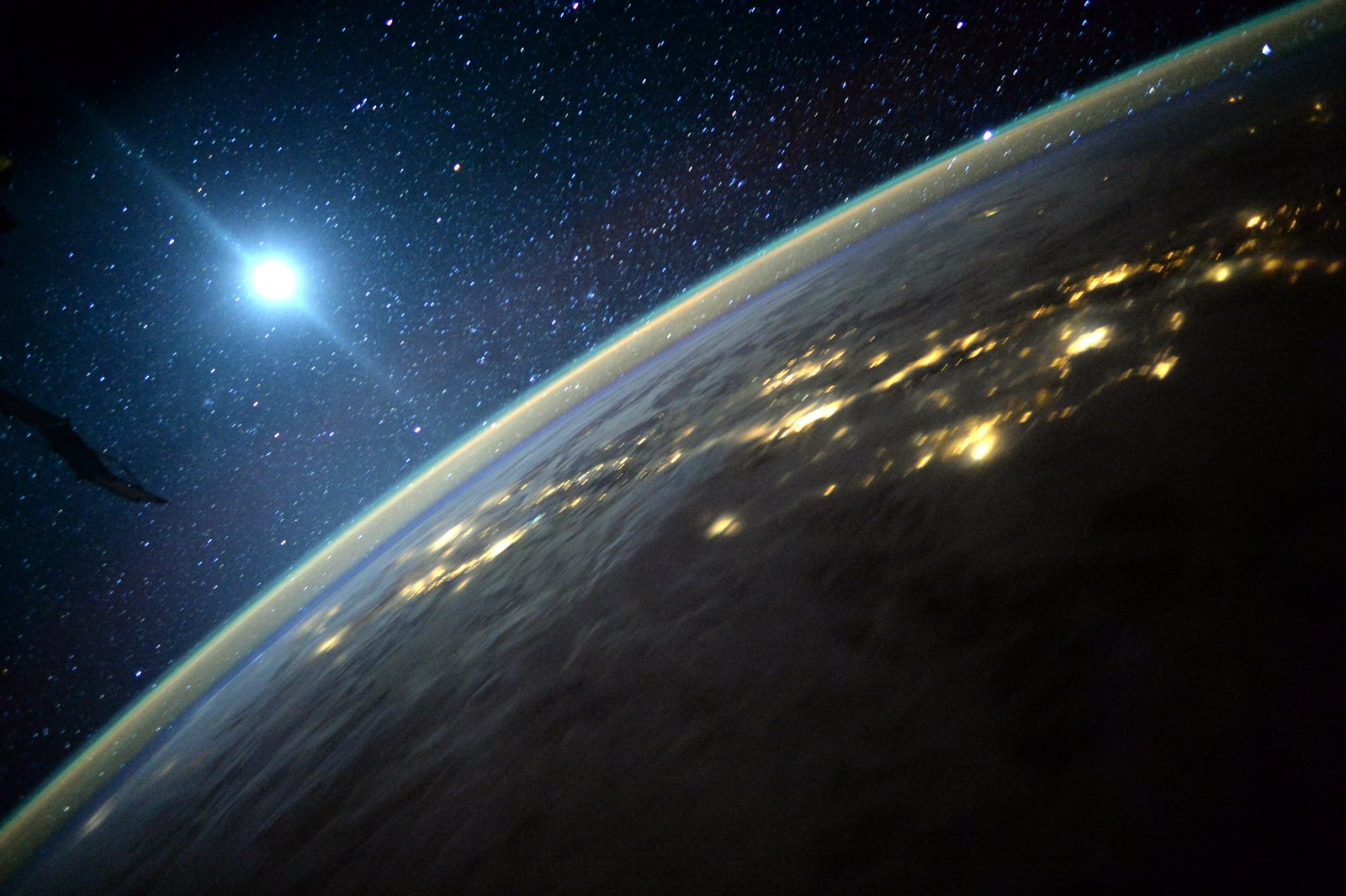
Moonlight onto Earth's cloud cover from space

Moonlight illuminating the Earth in the Hello, World photograph (Artemis II, 2026)

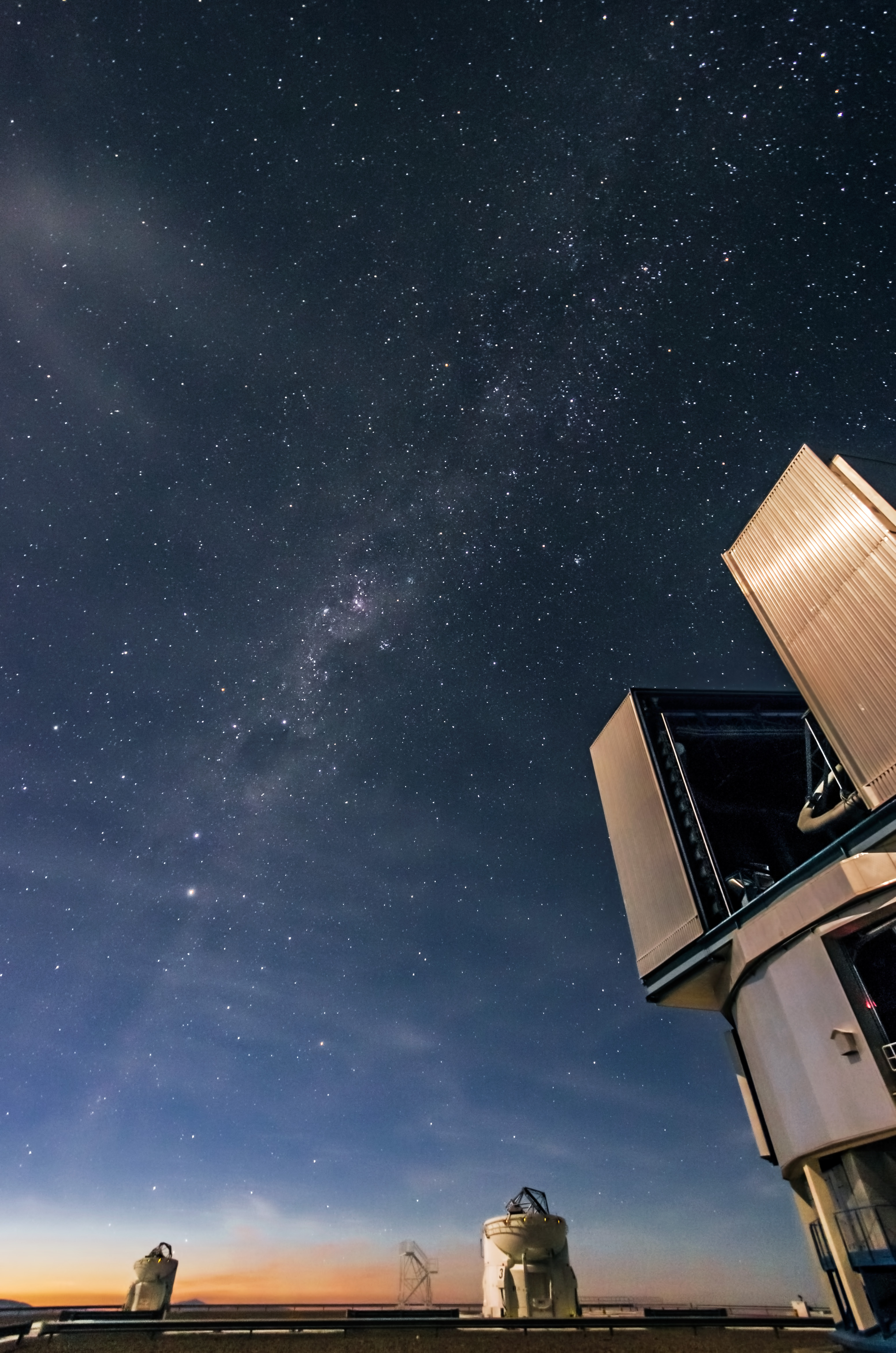
Moonlight shines on the Very Large Telescope.

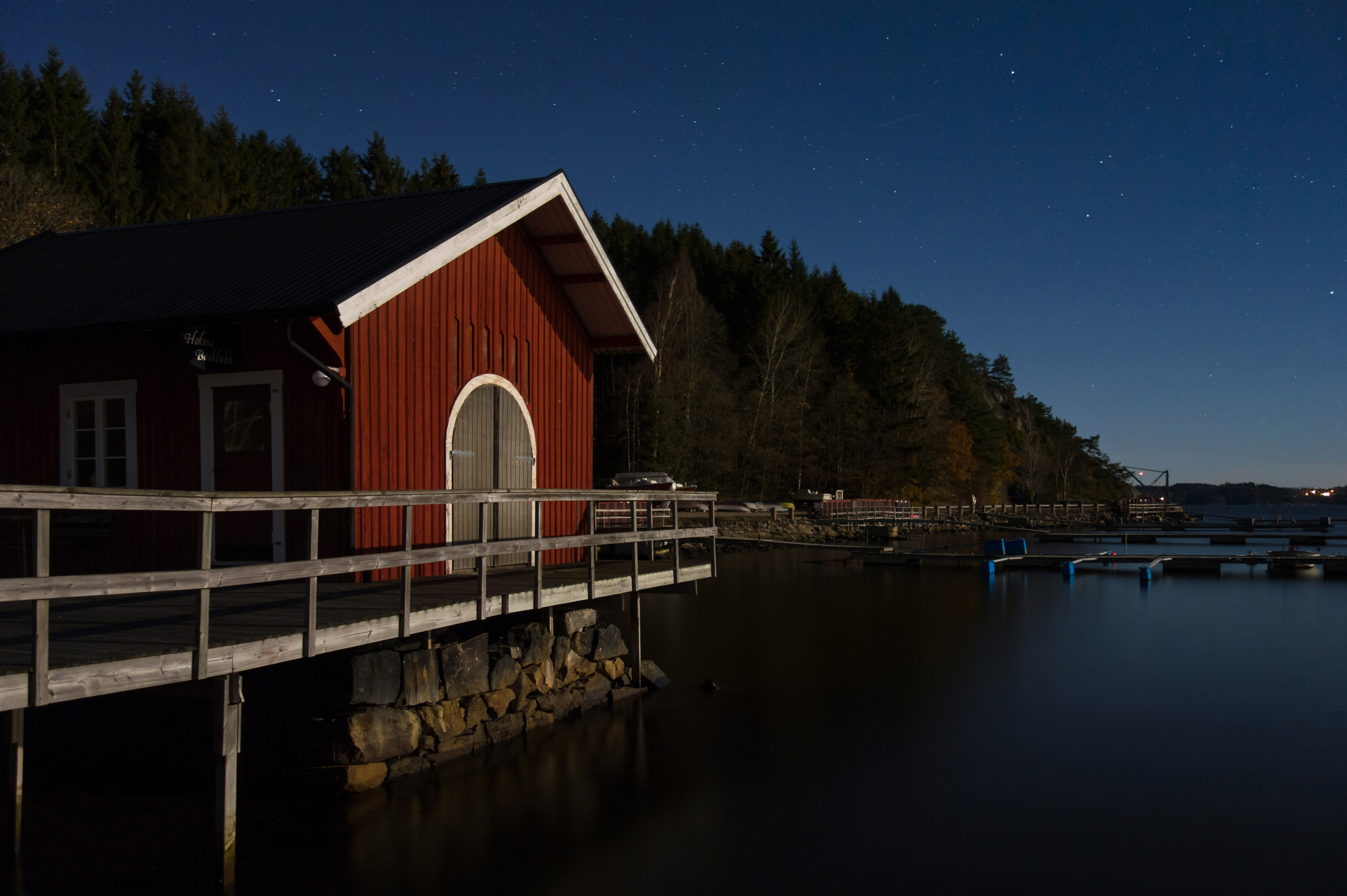
Moonlight illuminates a boat club in Holma, Sweden.

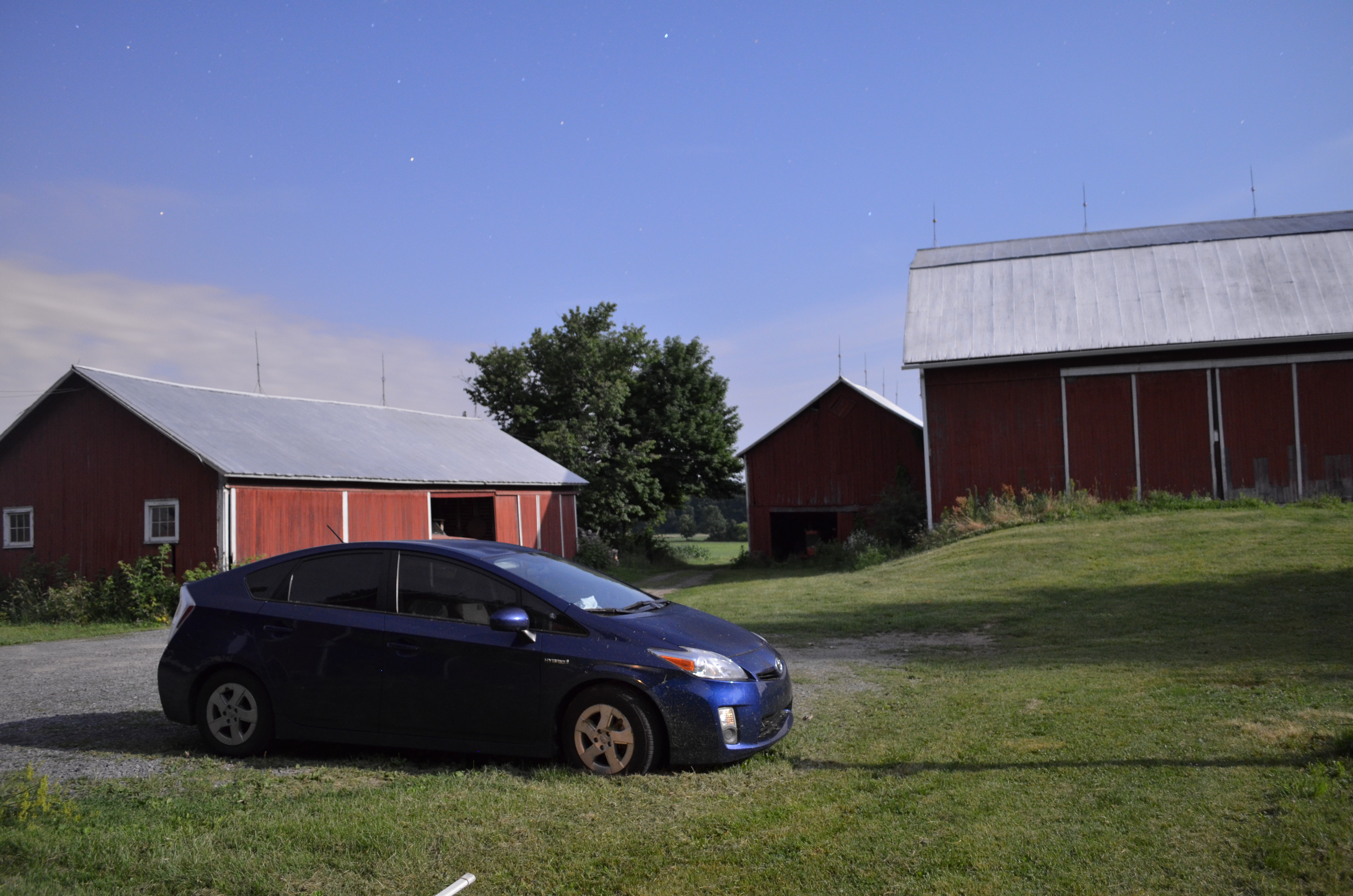
With manual exposure settings, photographs taken in moonlight do not appear much different from those taken in daylight.

== See also ==
- Airglow
- Daylight
- Diffuse reflection
- Lunar effect
- Scotobiology
- Starlight
