= National Register of Historic Places listings in Emporia, Virginia =

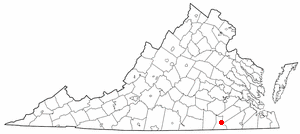
Location of Emporia in Virginia

This is a list of the National Register of Historic Places listings in Emporia, Virginia.

This is intended to be a complete list of the properties and districts on the National Register of Historic Places in the independent city of Emporia, Virginia, United States. The locations of National Register properties and districts for which the latitude and longitude coordinates are included below, may be seen in a Google map.

There are 7 properties and districts listed on the National Register in the city.

This National Park Service list is complete through NPS recent listings posted June 20, 2025.

== Current listings ==
	Name on the Register	Image	Date listed	Location	Description
1	Belfield-Emporia Historic District	Belfield-Emporia Historic District	November 1, 2007 (#07001137)	Roughly bounded by the railroad line, Atlantic Ave., and Budd and Valley Sts. 36°41′36″N 77°32′16″W	
2	Greensville County Courthouse Complex	Greensville County Courthouse Complex	July 21, 1983 (#83003279)	S. Main St. 36°41′11″N 77°32′32″W	
3	Greensville County Training School	Greensville County Training School	March 8, 2006 (#06000122)	105 Ruffin St. 36°41′56″N 77°32′07″W	
4	Hicksford-Emporia Historic District	Hicksford-Emporia Historic District	November 20, 2007 (#07001217)	S. Main St. and Brunswick Ave. 36°41′12″N 77°32′34″W	
5	H. T. Klugel Architectural Sheet Metal Work Building	H. T. Klugel Architectural Sheet Metal Work Building	April 2, 1973 (#73002208)	135 Atlantic Ave. 36°41′40″N 77°32′11″W	
6	Old Merchants and Farmers Bank Building	Old Merchants and Farmers Bank Building	May 7, 1979 (#79003278)	419 S. Main St. 36°41′08″N 77°32′35″W	
7	Village View	Village View	September 16, 1982 (#82004554)	221 Briggs St. 36°40′51″N 77°32′34″W	

== See also ==
- List of National Historic Landmarks in Virginia
- National Register of Historic Places listings in Virginia
- National Register of Historic Places listings in Greensville County, Virginia
