= National Register of Historic Places listings in Greensville County, Virginia =

Location of Greensville County in Virginia

This is a list of the National Register of Historic Places listings in Greensville County, Virginia.

This is intended to be a complete list of the properties and districts on the National Register of Historic Places in Greensville County, Virginia, United States. The locations of National Register properties and districts for which the latitude and longitude coordinates are included below, may be seen in a Google map.

There are 3 properties and districts listed on the National Register in the county. Another property was once listed but has been removed.

This National Park Service list is complete through NPS recent listings posted March 6, 2026.

== Current listings ==
	Name on the Register	Image	Date listed	Location	City or town	Description
1	Alexander Watson Batte House	Alexander Watson Batte House	July 3, 1991 (#91000831)	Southern side of Scotland Dr., 1500 feet west of its junction with Orion Rd. 36°48′03″N 77°33′18″W	Jarratt	
2	John Green Archaeological Sites		May 9, 1985 (#85000985)	Address Restricted	Emporia	
3	Weaver House	Weaver House	July 8, 1982 (#82004561)	Otterdam Rd. 36°45′35″N 77°30′48″W	Cowie Corner	

== Former listing ==
	Name on the Register	Image	Date listed	Date removed	Location	City or town	Description
1	Spring Hill		December 2, 1985 (#85003094)	June 10, 2005	State Route 730	Emporia	Demolished in 1999

== See also ==
- List of National Historic Landmarks in Virginia
- National Register of Historic Places listings in Virginia
- National Register of Historic Places listings in Emporia, Virginia
