= John Green Archaeological Sites =

Archaeological sites in Virginia, United States

- U.S. National Register of Historic Places
- Nearest city: Emporia, Virginia
- Area: 18 acres (7.3 ha)
- NRHP reference No.: 85000985
- Added to NRHP: May 9, 1985

The John Green Archaeological Sites are a pair of historic Native American sites in Greensville County, Virginia, near the city of Emporia. The sites are rare in southeastern Virginia for containing both precontact and postcontact artifacts. Excavations of the sites have yielded colonial trade items as well as evidence of settlement, including housing remnants, waste pits, and human burials.

The sites were listed on the National Register of Historic Places in 1985.

== See also ==
- National Register of Historic Places listings in Greensville County, Virginia
