= Greensville County Courthouse Complex =

Historic courthouse in Virginia, US

- U.S. National Register of Historic Places
- Virginia Landmarks Register
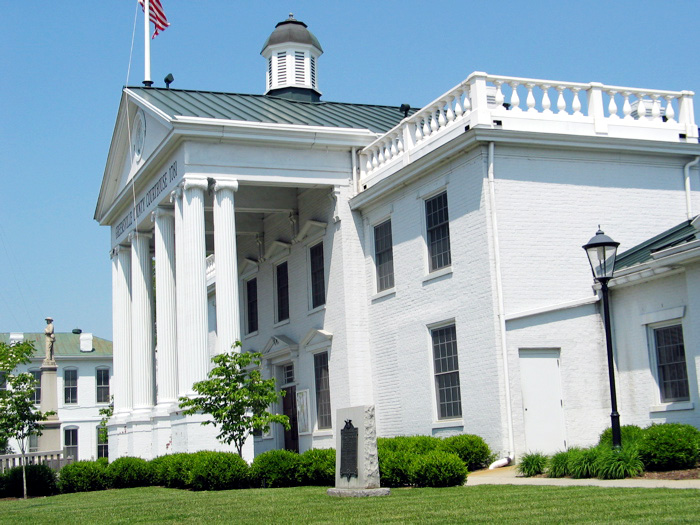
- Greensville County Courthouse

- Location within Virginia Location within the United States
- Interactive map showing the location of Greensville County Courthouse Complex
- Location: S. Main St., Emporia, Virginia
- Coordinates: 36°41′10″N 77°32′33″W
- Area: 1 acre (0.40 ha)
- Built: 1834
- Architect: Lynch, Daniel; Sherriff, Reuben
- Architectural style: Colonial Revival, Federal, Beaux Arts
- NRHP reference No.: 83003279
- VLR No.: 109-0002

Significant dates
- Added to NRHP: July 21, 1983
- Designated VLR: September 16, 1982

Greensville County Courthouse Complex is a historic courthouse complex located at South Main Street (US 301) between Hicksford Avenue and Spring Street in Emporia, Virginia. The three contributing buildings are the two-story, porticoed courthouse built in 1834, the clerk's office built in 1894, and the former Greensville Bank Building, now the county administrator's office, in 1900 and 1907. The courthouse originally took a Palladian form, but was remodeled between 1907 and 1910 to take a Beaux-Arts appearance. The clerk's office was considerably enlarged in 1916 and the Georgian-style facade added in 1961. The interior of the county administrator's office features elaborate pressed-tin walls and ceilings manufactured by the local concern, H.T. Klugel. The buildings are set upon the courthouse square, which includes a cannon honoring residents who participated in World War I.

It was listed on the National Register of Historic Places in 1983. The complex is also located within the Hicksford–Emporia Historic District.
