= Old Merchants and Farmers Bank Building =

Historic commercial building in Virginia, United States

- U.S. National Register of Historic Places
- Virginia Landmarks Register
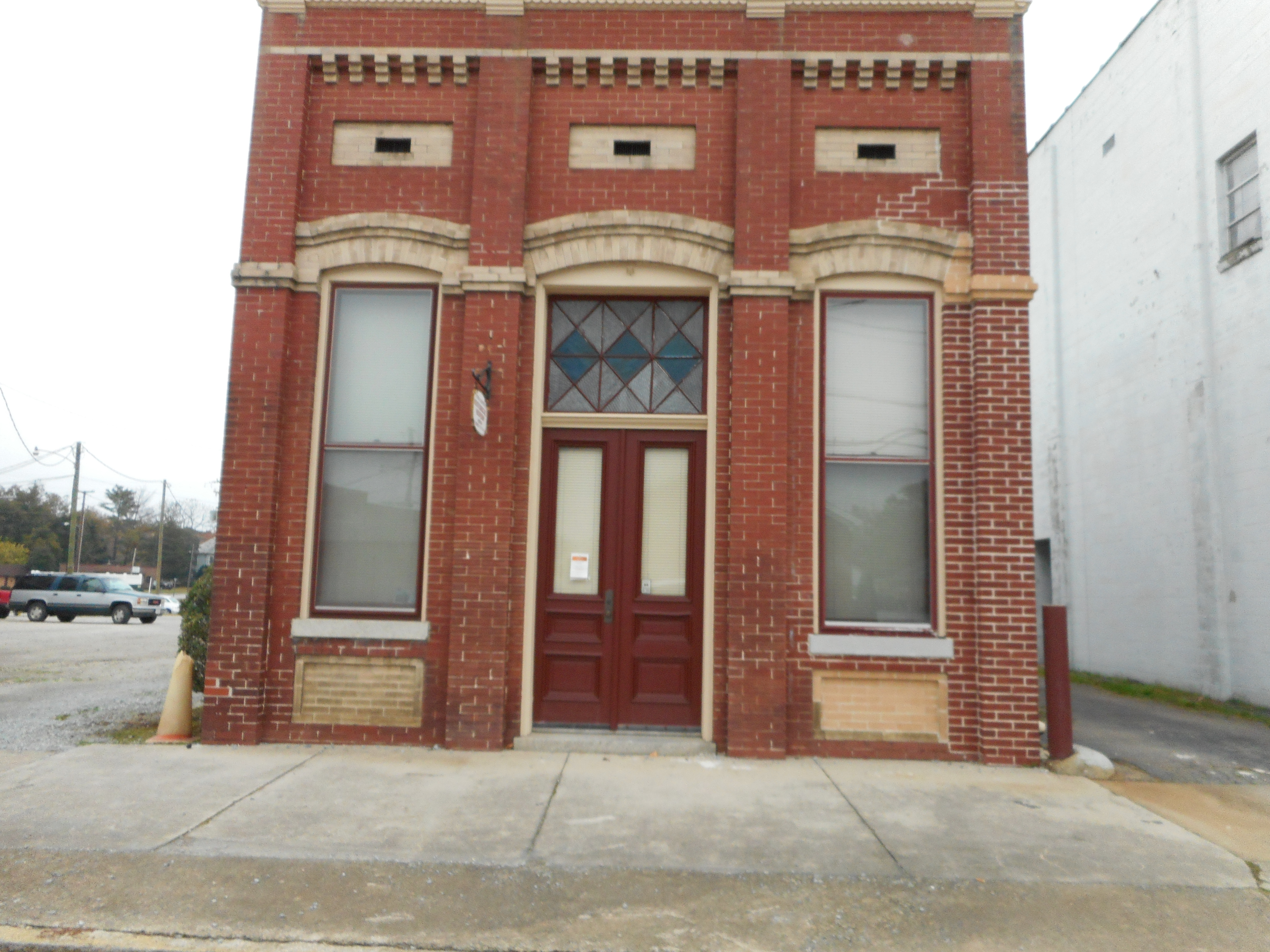
- The Old Merchants and Farmers Bank Building as taken from a moving car.

- Location within Virginia Location within the United States
- Location: 419 S. Main St., Emporia, Virginia
- Coordinates: 36°41′5″N 77°32′35″W
- Area: less than one acre
- Built: 1902
- NRHP reference No.: 79003278
- VLR No.: 109-0008

Significant dates
- Added to NRHP: May 7, 1979
- Designated VLR: November 21, 1978

The Old Merchants and Farmers Bank Building, also known as the Old Public Library, is a historic bank building located at Emporia, Virginia. It was built in 1902, and is a one-story, eclectic, red and yellow brick structure with a concave mansard roof. The front facade features a galvanized sheet-metal cornice that may have been manufactured by H. T. Klugel. The bank occupied the building until 1914, after which it housed the public library until 1977. It is currently occupied by the Greensville-Emporia Historical Museum.

It was listed on the National Register of Historic Places in 1979. The former bank is also located within the Hicksford–Emporia Historic District.
