= Emporia, Virginia =

Independent city in Virginia, United States

- Independent city
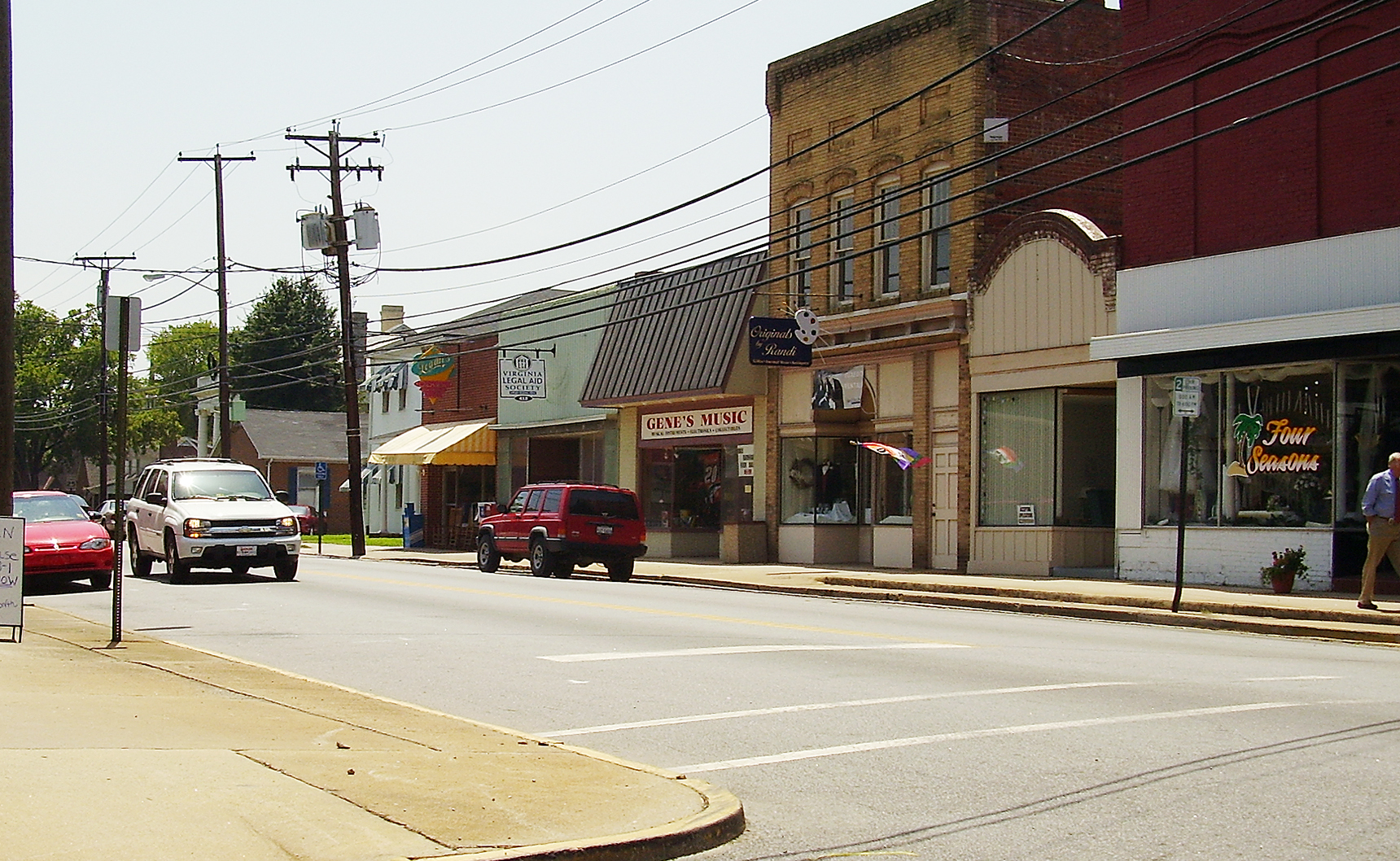
- Downtown Emporia

- Seal
- Nickname: "E-Town"
- Location in the Commonwealth of Virginia
- Coordinates: 36°41′34″N 77°32′17″W
- Country: United States
- State: Virginia
- County: None (Independent city)
- Chartered: 1967

Government
  - Mayor: Carolyn Carey (I)

Area
  - Total: 6.97 sq mi (18.05 km^{2})
  - Land: 6.90 sq mi (17.88 km^{2})
  - Water: 0.066 sq mi (0.17 km^{2})
- Elevation: 128 ft (39 m)

Population (2020)
  - Total: 5,766
  - Estimate (2025): 5,447 ▼
  - Density: 835.2/sq mi (322.5/km^{2})
- Time zone: UTC-5 (EST)
  - Summer (DST): UTC-4 (EDT)
- ZIP code: 23847/23867
- Area code: 434
- FIPS code: 51-25808
- GNIS feature ID: 1498475
- Website: ci.emporia.va.us

Emporia is an independent city in the Commonwealth of Virginia in the United States. It is the county seat of Greensville County. As of the 2020 census, the population was 5,766, making it the third-least populous city in Virginia. The Bureau of Economic Analysis combines the city of Emporia with surrounding Greensville County for statistical purposes. The town has become notorious for being a major speed trap.

== History ==
Emporia has long been a transportation crossroads. The Meherrin River, like the Nottoway River and the Blackwater River, empties to the southeast into Albemarle Sound. The Town of Hicksford (originally Hicks' Ford) was settled by Captain Robert Hicks (1658–1739) in the Virginia Colony, where the east-west Fort Road of eastern Virginia crossed the Meherrin River en route to Fort Christanna. The other crossing road was a major north–south trail used by native peoples and sometimes called the "Tuscarora Path" and later became the "Halifax road".

Captain Hicks was an Indian trader who had lived in Prince George County before moving his family to Hicksford, when he became the Commander of Fort Christanna. (His surname is spelled both "Hicks" and "Hix" in colonial records.) In 1709, Hicks purchased a land tract of 1,280 acres (520 ha) along the north side of the Meherrin River that was previously surveyed by Arthur Kavanaugh.

When Greensville County separated from Brunswick County in 1781, Hicksford became the county seat. (Court convened monthly at a nearby tavern). In May 1781, British Col. Banastre Tarleton's cavalry crossed at Hicksford while raiding Greensville and Southampton counties.

After statehood, the Virginia General Assembly recognized the Town of Belfield on the river's northern bank in 1798, and Hicksford on the southern bank the next year.

In the following decades, the surrounding area remained rural and its population dispersed. Hicksford's population continued to exceed that of Belfield. An 1847 account documented 12–20 dwellings in Hicksford worth about $10,025 while Belfield's buildings were valued at $3,050; in 1865 Hicksford's buildings were valued at $20,700 and Belfield's at $3,650. However, by 1885, shortly before the towns merged, because of railroad links discussed below Hicksford had increased in assets only to $22,915 while Belfield had grown to $7,300.

By 1857, Belfield was a stop on the Petersburg Railroad to Weldon begun in 1830. During the American Civil War, the Petersburg Railroad became a tactical prize as Union troops sought to isolate the confederate capital. Two battles for the control of the Weldon Railroad were fought near Petersburg during the Siege of Petersburg in June 1864 and September 1864. Then on December 7, 1864, 28,000 Union troops led by Major General Gouverneur K. Warren tried to sever that key supply route further south by uprooting tracks, and managed to stop Confederate troops under Major General Wade Hampton from destroying the Meherrin River bridge. However, when the Federals retreated, Confederates rebuilt the railway line. After the war, the Wilmington and Weldon Railroad was leased to the Wilmington, Columbia and Augusta Railroad. It went bankrupt in 1878.

Benjamin D. Tillar Jr. (1855–1887), a Greensville County native and state delegate, received a charter for the Atlantic and Danville Railway. He planned for it to go from Portsmouth as had the Weldon railroad, but with a more westward route through the Meherrin River towns.

In 1887, Hicksford and Belfield merged, forming the newly incorporated town of Emporia. It was named after the town of Emporia, Kansas, home town of Tillar's friend U.S. Senator Preston B. Plumb of Kansas. However, the railroad boom proved short-lived, as poor farm conditions and the Panic of 1893 caused the county's population to decrease between 1880 and 1890. The Seaboard and Roanoke Railroad also ran through Emporia.

Emporia was re-chartered by the state in 1892. The town issued its first bonds in 1900 (to establish a water plant, and fund lighting and street improvements). It hosted an agricultural fair in 1906, and brick buildings replaced frame structures. Banks were chartered, followed by land improvement companies and insurance companies, then various stores, automobile companies and cola bottlers.

The Virginia General Assembly re-chartered the Town of Emporia as an independent city in 1967, five years after the Norfolk and Western Railway purchased and reorganized the Atlantic and Danville Railway. Now, a major north–south CSX railway line crosses a Norfolk Southern east–west line in Emporia, the latter or which has been abandoned.

Also, U.S. Route 58 crosses Emporia east-west and Interstate 95 and U.S. Route 301 cross north–south. Emporia continues to serve travelers.

Historic buildings in Emporia include the Belfield-Emporia Historic District, Hicksford-Emporia Historic District, Greensville County Courthouse Complex, Greensville County Training School, H. T. Klugel Architectural Sheet Metal Work Building, Old Merchants and Farmers Bank Building, and Village View, all of which are listed on the National Register of Historic Places.

== Geography ==
Emporia is located at 36°41′34″N 77°32′17″W (36.693018, -77.53809).

According to the United States Census Bureau, the city has a total area of 7.0 square miles (18.1 km^{2}), of which 6.9 square miles (17.9 km^{2}) is land and 0.1 square miles (0.26 km^{2}), or 1.1%, is water. The city is located about 65 miles (105 km) south of Richmond, about 80 miles (130 km) west of Norfolk and about 60 miles (97 km) north of Rocky Mount, North Carolina.

== Climate ==
Climate data for Emporia, Virginia (1991–2020 normals, extremes 1893–present)
Month	Jan	Feb	Mar	Apr	May	Jun	Jul	Aug	Sep	Oct	Nov	Dec	Year
Record high °F (°C)	81 (27)	82 (28)	89 (32)	95 (35)	98 (37)	106 (41)	109 (43)	103 (39)	100 (38)	100 (38)	85 (29)	80 (27)	109 (43)
Mean daily maximum °F (°C)	50.9 (10.5)	54.2 (12.3)	61.5 (16.4)	71.7 (22.1)	78.8 (26.0)	86.0 (30.0)	89.8 (32.1)	88.3 (31.3)	82.7 (28.2)	72.9 (22.7)	62.6 (17.0)	54.0 (12.2)	71.1 (21.7)
Daily mean °F (°C)	39.8 (4.3)	42.4 (5.8)	49.0 (9.4)	58.7 (14.8)	67.2 (19.6)	75.4 (24.1)	79.6 (26.4)	78.1 (25.6)	72.2 (22.3)	60.9 (16.1)	50.4 (10.2)	43.1 (6.2)	59.7 (15.4)
Mean daily minimum °F (°C)	28.7 (−1.8)	30.5 (−0.8)	36.6 (2.6)	45.8 (7.7)	55.7 (13.2)	64.8 (18.2)	69.3 (20.7)	67.8 (19.9)	61.6 (16.4)	49.0 (9.4)	38.3 (3.5)	32.3 (0.2)	48.4 (9.1)
Record low °F (°C)	−24 (−31)	0 (−18)	12 (−11)	21 (−6)	32 (0)	41 (5)	50 (10)	43 (6)	34 (1)	23 (−5)	12 (−11)	0 (−18)	−24 (−31)
Average precipitation inches (mm)	3.40 (86)	2.59 (66)	4.05 (103)	3.43 (87)	3.71 (94)	3.97 (101)	4.86 (123)	5.07 (129)	4.92 (125)	3.47 (88)	3.16 (80)	3.56 (90)	46.19 (1,173)
Average snowfall inches (cm)	0.6 (1.5)	0.3 (0.76)	0.0 (0.0)	0.0 (0.0)	0.0 (0.0)	0.0 (0.0)	0.0 (0.0)	0.0 (0.0)	0.0 (0.0)	0.0 (0.0)	0.0 (0.0)	0.5 (1.3)	1.4 (3.6)
Average precipitation days (≥ 0.01 in)	10.0	8.7	10.3	9.2	10.5	9.5	10.6	9.2	8.9	7.0	8.3	9.9	112.1
Average snowy days (≥ 0.1 in)	0.3	0.2	0.0	0.0	0.0	0.0	0.0	0.0	0.0	0.0	0.0	0.2	0.7
Source: NOAA

== Governance ==
Emporia was a Republican stronghold for many years after its founding and through the Reagan era. However, in the 1990s it began shifting toward the Democratic Party, with Bill Clinton carrying it by a majority for the first time in 1996. Since then, Emporia has voted consistently Democratic, with this party’s share of the vote increasing significantly under Barack Obama in 2008. In 2020, Joe Biden won over 67% of the vote, the strongest showing for a Democrat since the city was chartered.

United States presidential election results for Emporia, Virginia
Year	Republican		Democratic		Third party(ies)	
Year	No.	%	No.	%	No.	%
1968	812	37.06%	657	29.99%	722	32.95%
1972	1,340	68.82%	565	29.02%	42	2.16%
1976	1,055	52.23%	899	44.50%	66	3.27%
1980	988	51.95%	855	44.95%	59	3.10%
1984	1,252	60.25%	807	38.84%	19	0.91%
1988	1,289	56.61%	977	42.91%	11	0.48%
1992	1,094	47.18%	1,048	45.19%	177	7.63%
1996	835	40.65%	1,103	53.70%	116	5.65%
2000	938	45.10%	1,116	53.65%	26	1.25%
2004	970	43.67%	1,247	56.15%	4	0.18%
2008	897	34.28%	1,702	65.04%	18	0.69%
2012	886	32.86%	1,793	66.51%	17	0.63%
2016	789	33.33%	1,530	64.64%	48	2.03%
2020	754	31.67%	1,612	67.70%	15	0.63%
2024	744	34.14%	1,419	65.12%	16	0.73%

The City of Emporia is governed by a council–manager system. There are seven members of city council elected from districts and a weak mayor elected at large. City council and the mayor are elected to four-year terms, in federal election years. Their terms are staggered so that not all members are elected at once.

The City of Emporia is also served by its own Treasurer, Commissioner of the Revenue, Sheriff and General Registrar. The courts system, Greensville County Sheriff, Commonwealth's Attorney and the Public Schools are shared with Greensville County.

== Demographics ==
Historical population
Census	Pop.	Note	%±
1890	1,088		—
1900	1,027		−5.6%
1910	2,018		96.5%
1920	1,869		−7.4%
1930	2,144		14.7%
1940	2,735		27.6%
1950	5,664		107.1%
1960	5,535		−2.3%
1970	5,300		−4.2%
1980	4,840		−8.7%
1990	5,306		9.6%
2000	5,665		6.8%
2010	5,927		4.6%
2020	5,766		−2.7%
2025 (est.)	5,447	▼	−5.5%
U.S. Decennial Census; 1790-1960 1900-1990; 1990-2000

=== Racial and ethnic composition ===
Emporia city, Virginia – Racial and ethnic composition Note: the US Census treats Hispanic/Latino as an ethnic category. This table excludes Latinos from the racial categories and assigns them to a separate category. Hispanics/Latinos may be of any race.
Race / Ethnicity (NH = Non-Hispanic)	Pop 1980	Pop 1990	Pop 2000	Pop 2010	Pop 2020	% 1980	% 1990	% 2000	% 2010	% 2020
White alone (NH)	2,864	2,825	2,342	1,848	1,529	59.17%	53.24%	41.34%	31.18%	26.52%
Black or African American alone (NH)	1,913	2,387	3,174	3,685	3,631	39.52%	44.99%	56.03%	62.17%	62.97%
Native American or Alaska Native alone (NH)	2	11	4	8	7	0.04%	0.21%	0.07%	0.13%	0.12%
Asian alone (NH)	5	24	30	43	50	0.10%	0.45%	0.53%	0.73%	0.87%
Native Hawaiian or Pacific Islander alone (NH)	x	x	4	4	4	x	x	0.07%	0.07%	0.07%
Other race alone (NH)	3	0	3	7	37	0.06%	0.00%	0.05%	0.12%	0.64%
Mixed race or Multiracial (NH)	x	x	24	70	163	x	x	0.42%	1.18%	2.83%
Hispanic or Latino (any race)	53	59	84	262	345	1.10%	1.11%	1.48%	4.42%	5.98%
Total	4,840	5,306	5,665	5,927	5,766	100.00%	100.00%	100.00%	100.00%	100.00%

=== 2020 census ===
As of the 2020 census, Emporia had a population of 5,766. The median age was 40.8 years.

23.7% of residents were under the age of 18 and 20.0% of residents were 65 years of age or older. For every 100 females there were 84.2 males, and for every 100 females age 18 and over there were 79.1 males age 18 and over.

95.0% of residents lived in urban areas, while 5.0% lived in rural areas.

There were 2,325 households in Emporia, of which 32.0% had children under the age of 18 living in them. Of all households, 27.0% were married-couple households, 20.3% were households with a male householder and no spouse or partner present, and 43.8% were households with a female householder and no spouse or partner present. About 34.1% of all households were made up of individuals and 17.1% had someone living alone who was 65 years of age or older.

There were 2,647 housing units, of which 12.2% were vacant. The homeowner vacancy rate was 4.2% and the rental vacancy rate was 7.6%.

Racial composition as of the 2020 census
Race	Number	Percent
White	1,544	26.8%
Black or African American	3,655	63.4%
American Indian and Alaska Native	23	0.4%
Asian	53	0.9%
Native Hawaiian and Other Pacific Islander	6	0.1%
Some other race	272	4.7%
Two or more races	213	3.7%

=== 2010 census ===
As of the 2010 United States census, there were 5,927 people living in the city. 62.5% were Black or African American, 32.7% White, 0.7% Asian, 0.3% Native American, 0.1% Pacific Islander, 2.1% of some other race and 1.5% of two or more races. 4.4% were Hispanic or Latino (of any race).

By percentage of counties or independent cities, Emporia has the highest population of Muslims in the United States as of the 2010 census, with 28.99% of the independent city being adhering Muslims.

=== 2000 census ===
As of the 2000 census, there were 5,665 people, 2,226 households, and 1,406 families living in the city. The population density was 821.9 people per square mile (317.3 people/km^{2}). There were 2,412 housing units at an average density of 349.9 units per square mile (135.1 units/km^{2}). The racial makeup of the city was 56.15% Black or African American, 42.45% White, 0.07% Native American, 0.53% Asian, 0.07% Pacific Islander, 0.30% from other races, and 0.42% from two or more races. 1.48% of the population were Hispanic or Latino of any race.

There were 2,226 households, out of which 29.2% had children under the age of 18 living with them, 37.5% were married couples living together, 21.0% had a female householder with no husband present, and 36.8% were non-families. 32.2% of all households were made up of individuals, and 17.4% had someone living alone who was 65 years of age or older. The average household size was 2.43 and the average family size was 3.05.

In the city, the population was spread out, with 25.2% under the age of 18, 8.1% from 18 to 24, 25.6% from 25 to 44, 20.6% from 45 to 64, and 20.6% who were 65 years of age or older. The median age was 39 years. For every 100 females, there were 83.4 males. For every 100 females age 18 and over, there were 78.1 males.

The median income for a household in the city was $30,333, and the median income for a family was $35,743. Males had a median income of $27,772 versus $21,657 for females. The per capita income for the city was $15,377. About 11.4% of families and 16.0% of the population were below the poverty line, including 21.5% of those under age 18 and 14.5% of those age 65 or over.

== Festivals ==
The Emporia Bicycling Club hosts regular group rides, including the annual Great Peanut ride which attracts hundreds of bicyclists who ride to visit a peanut farm and are treated to hearty meals and live entertainment at camp.

The Virginia Pork Festival was held each second Wednesday in June. Over 40,000 pounds of pork is served alongside alcoholic beverages, hushpuppies and sweet potato french fries. The festival is currently on hold due to lack of funding.

== Education ==
Greensville County Public Schools serves both Emporia and Greensville County. Its high school is Greensville County High School.

Circa 1972 there was an effort by Emporia residents to create a separate school division. On June 22, 1972, the United States Supreme Court denied the creation of the district on a 5–4 basis, with the four dissenters having been appointed by U.S. president Richard Nixon.

== Infrastructure ==
- Interstate 95
- US 58
- US 301
- Emporia-Greensville Regional Airport (EMV)
- Greensville Emporia Transit (GET) provides public transportation with 15 fixed stops in Emporia and surrounding Greensville County on weekdays from 07:00 a.m - 7:00 p.m.

== Notable people ==
- John N. Dalton, Governor of Virginia
- Willie Gillus, former NFL quarterback
- Benjamin S. Griffin, retired U.S. Army General
- June Harding, actress, artist
- Maurice Hicks, former NFL running back
- Henry Jordan, NFL player in Pro Football Hall of Fame
- Wynne LeGrow, Democratic politician
- Lawrence Lucie, musician
- Sharon Manning, pro basketball player; now coaches the Greensvile County Highschool's basketball team
- John Y. Mason (1799-1859), U.S. Secretary of the Navy, Congressman, U.S. Attorney General
- Theresa Merritt, actress
- Vern Morgan, baseball player and coach
- Elliott Sadler, NASCAR racecar driver
- Hermie Sadler, NASCAR racecar driver
- Raynor Scheine, actor
- Bryant Stith, basketball player, University of Virginia and NBA
- E. J. Wilson, NFL defensive lineman for Tampa Bay Buccaneers
- Larry D. Wyche, retired U.S. Army Lieutenant General

== See also ==
- National Register of Historic Places listings in Emporia, Virginia
