= Weaver House (Cowie Corner, Virginia) =

Historic house in Virginia, United States

- U.S. National Register of Historic Places
- Virginia Landmarks Register
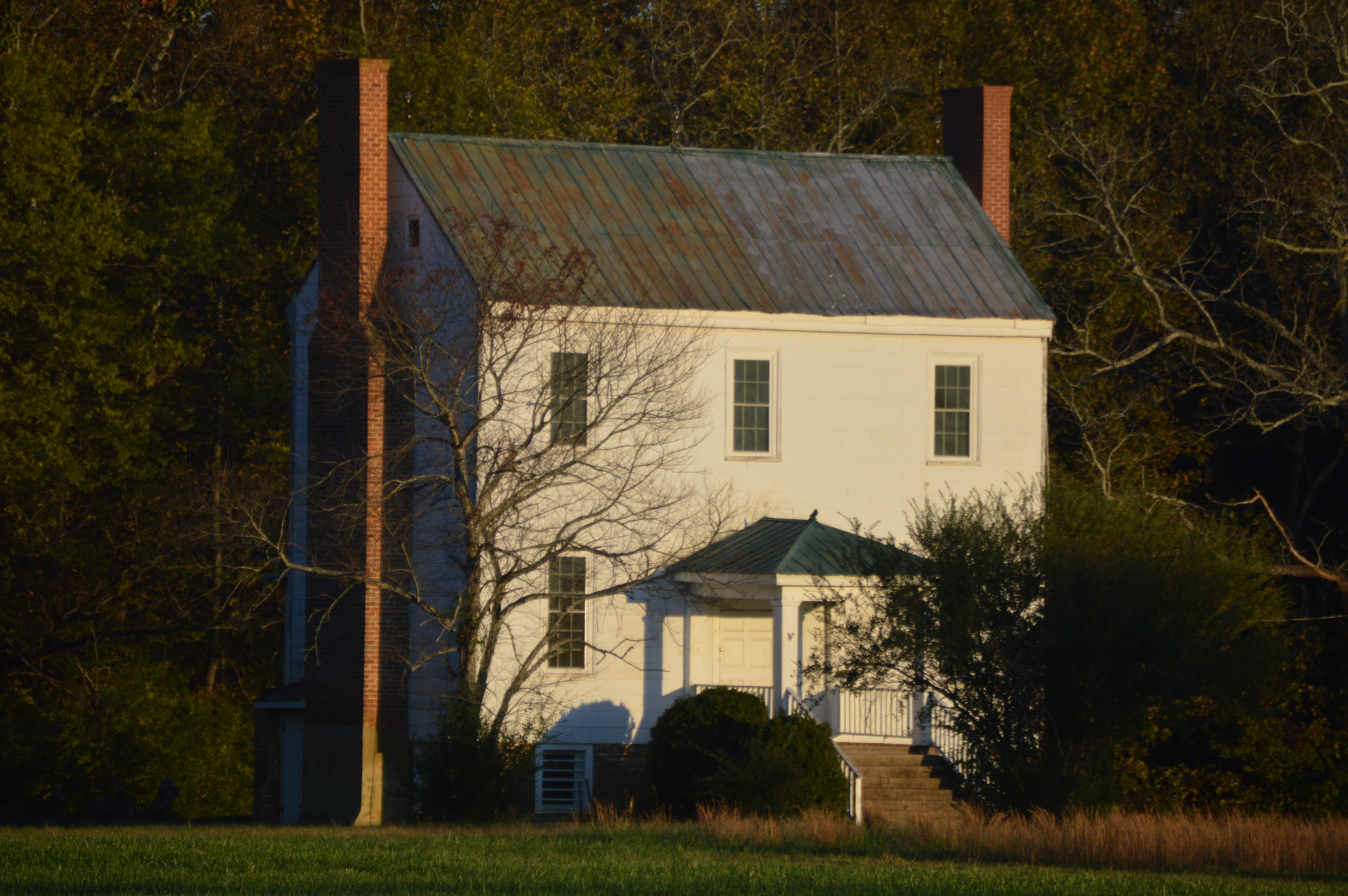
- Roadside view of the house in 2016

- Location within Virginia Location within the United States
- Location: Otterdam Road, Cowie Corner, Virginia
- Coordinates: 36°45′35″N 77°30′48″W
- Area: 7 acres (2.8 ha)
- Built: 1838-1840
- NRHP reference No.: 82004561
- VLR No.: 040-0006

Significant dates
- Added to NRHP: July 8, 1982
- Designated VLR: June 16, 1981

The Weaver House, also known as Waller, is a historic home located at Cowie Corner, Greensville County, Virginia. It was built between 1838 and 1840 for Jarrad Weaver on land which had belonged to the Waller family of Williamsburg. It is a two-story, single-pile, wood frame residence. It sits on a brick basement and has a standing-seam sheet metal gable roof. The front facade features a hipped-roof porch with square columns.

It was listed on the National Register of Historic Places in 1982.
