= Weldon, Virginia =

Unincorporated community in Virginia, US

Coordinates: 37°05′16″N 80°48′19″W

Weldon is an unincorporated community in Pulaski County, in the U.S. state of Virginia.
