= Belfield–Emporia Historic District =

Historic district in Virginia, United States

- U.S. National Register of Historic Places
- U.S. Historic district
- Virginia Landmarks Register
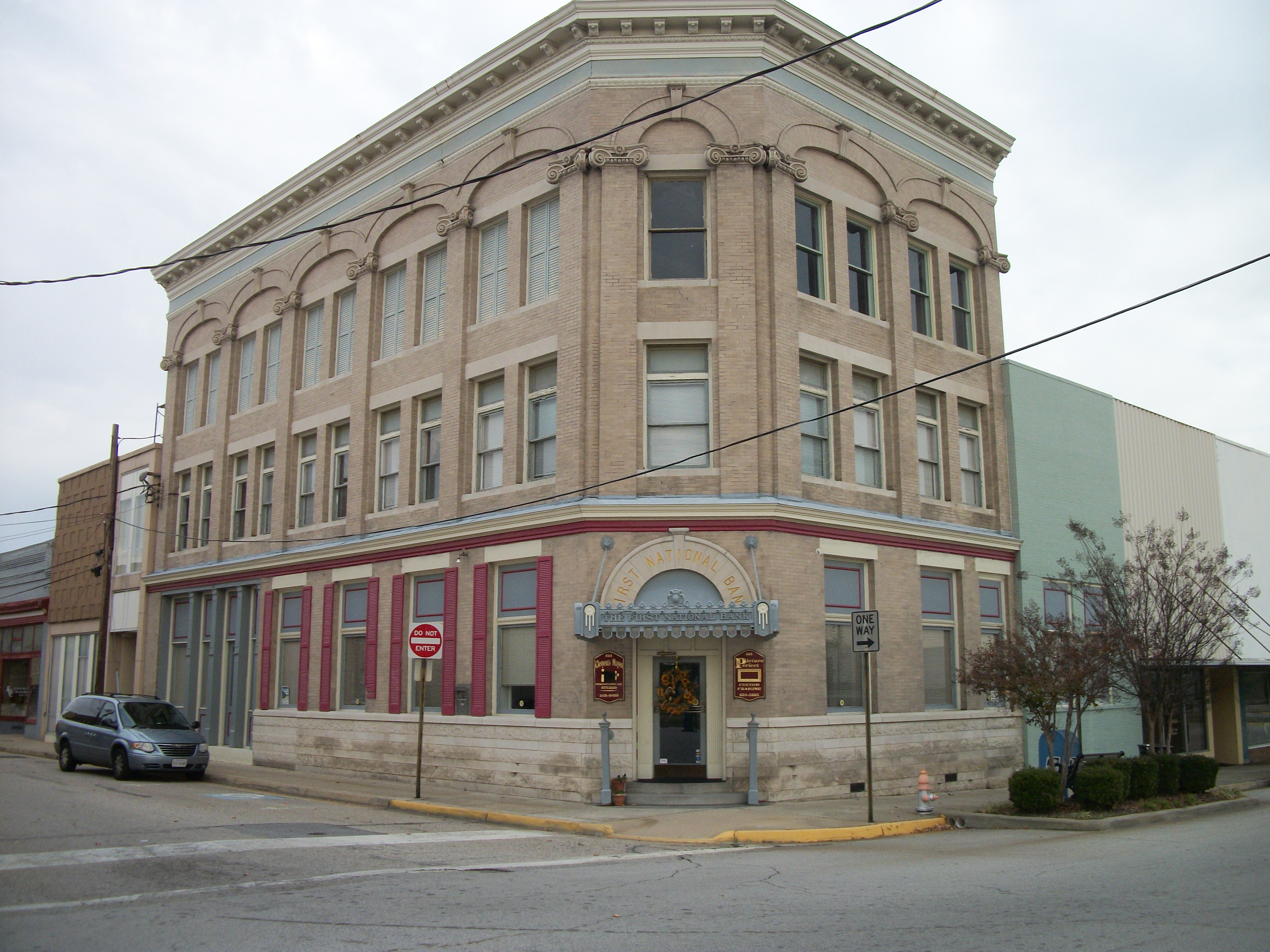
- The former Emporia First National Bank

- Location within Virginia Location within the United States
- Location: Roughly bounded by the Petersburg & Danville RR, Atlantic Ave., Budd & Valley Sts., Emporia, Virginia
- Coordinates: 36°41′33″N 77°32′20″W
- Area: 8.9 acres (3.6 ha)
- Built: 1887
- Architectural style: Italianate, Early Commercial
- NRHP reference No.: 07001137
- VLR No.: 109-0020

Significant dates
- Added to NRHP: November 1, 2007
- Designated VLR: September 5, 2007

Belfield–Emporia Historic District, also known as North Emporia, is a national historic district located at Emporia, Virginia. The district includes 41 contributing buildings in the Belfield section of Emporia. In 1887, the neighboring towns of Hicksford and Belfield merged to form the town of Emporia. The district generally consists of late-19th- to early-20th-century brick buildings laid out in a "T"-shape at the intersection of Halifax and Baker Streets. Notable buildings include the Hotel Virginia, the Bethlehem Building or former First National Bank of Emporia (1907), Petersburg and Danville Railroad passenger station, and Pair's Furniture (c. 1904). Located in the district is the separately listed H. T. Klugel Architectural Sheet Metal Work Building.

It was listed on the National Register of Historic Places in 2007.

== Gallery ==
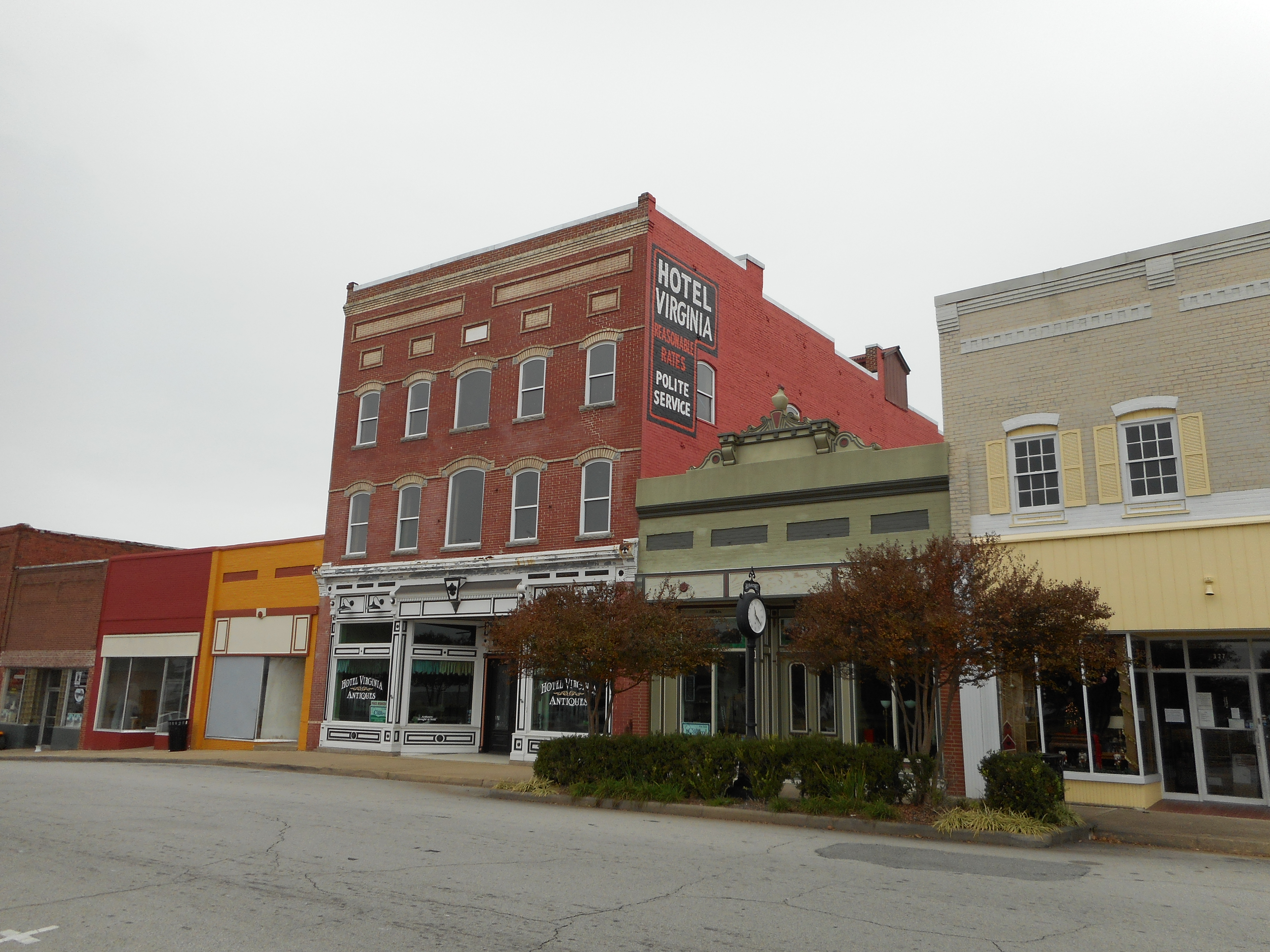
Hotel Virginia

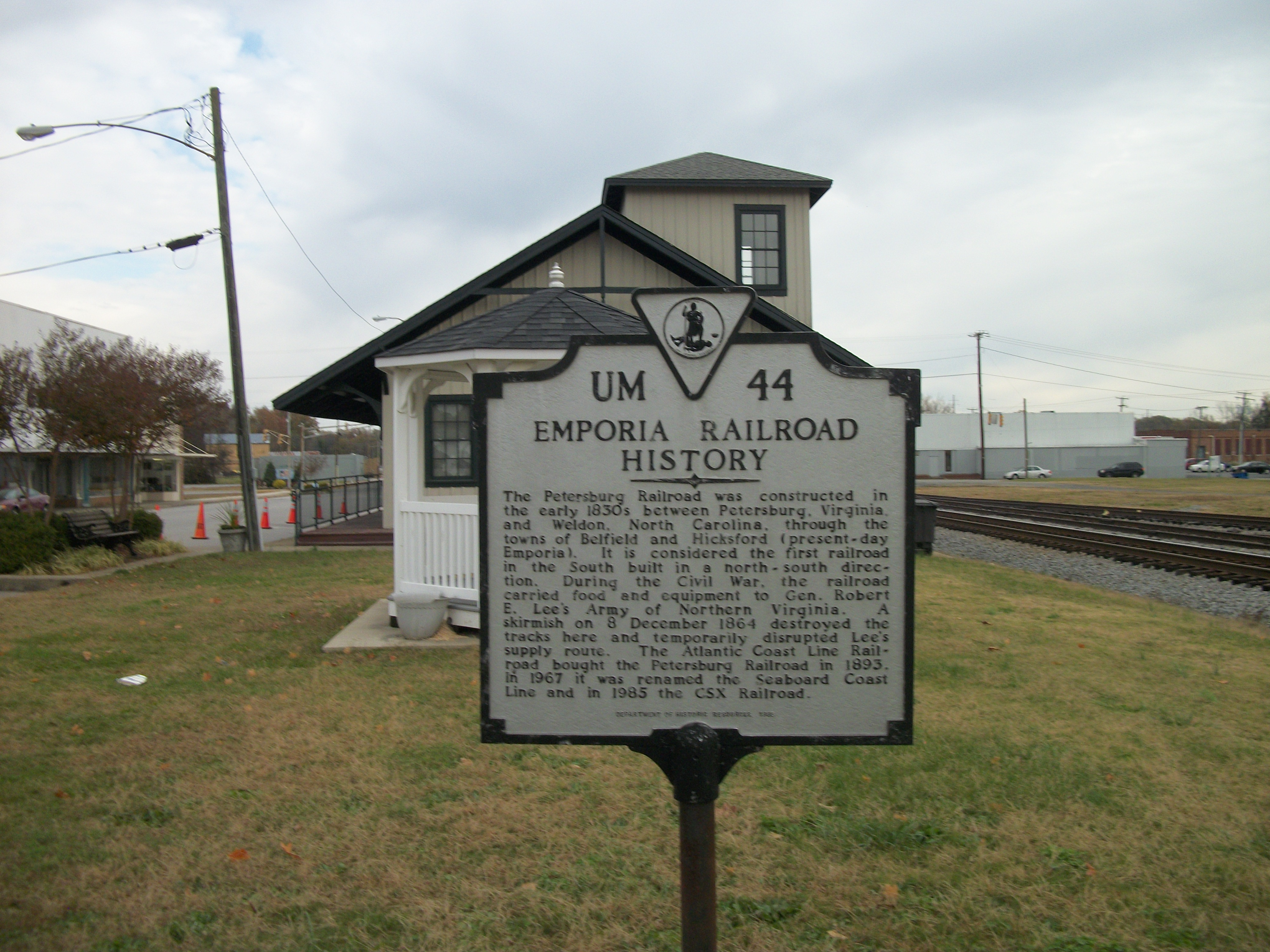
The old Petersburg and Danville (ACL) Railroad station.

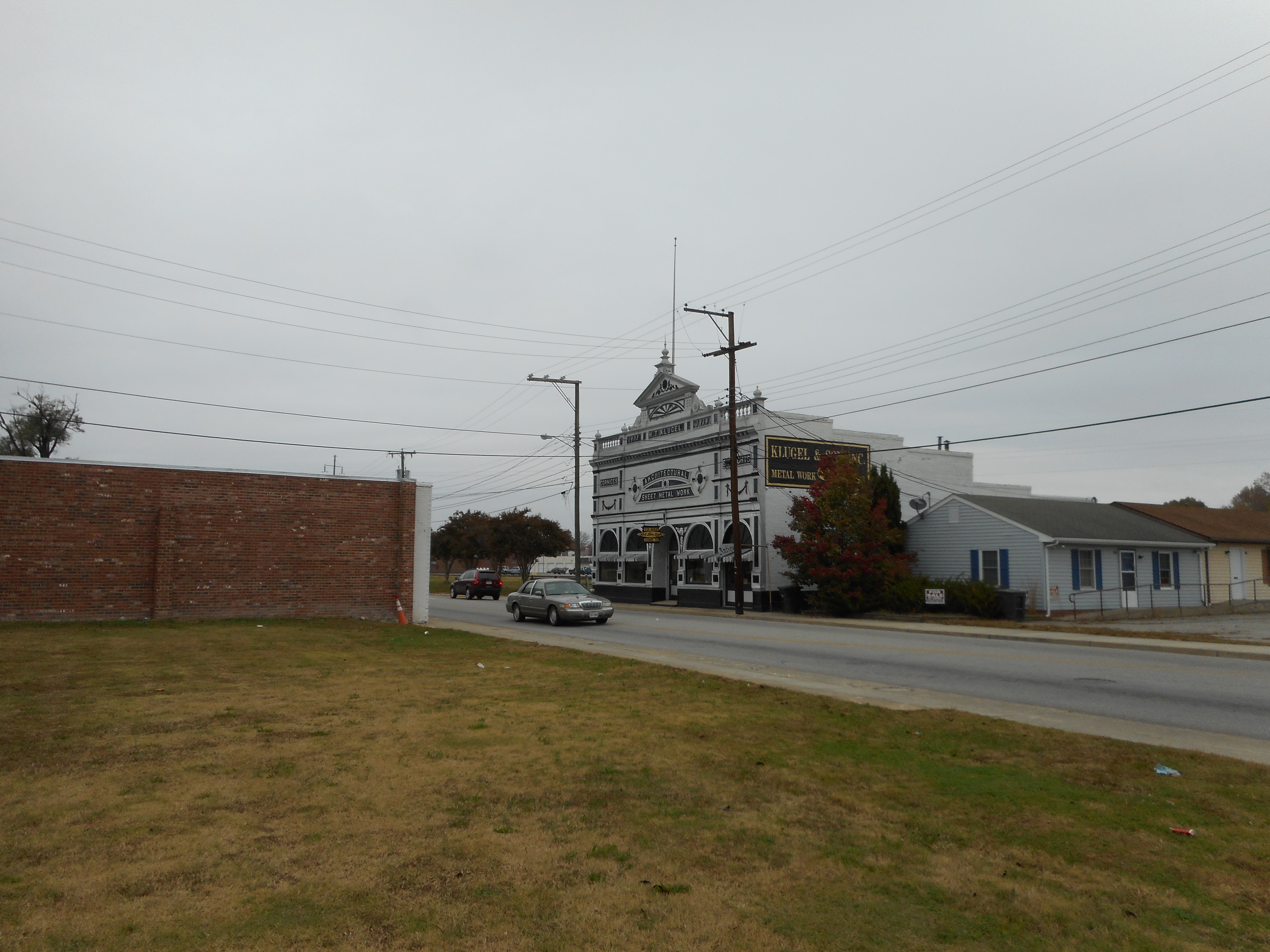
The H.T. Klugel Building on US BUS 58.
