= Alexander Watson Batte House =

Historic house in Virginia, United States

- U.S. National Register of Historic Places
- Virginia Landmarks Register
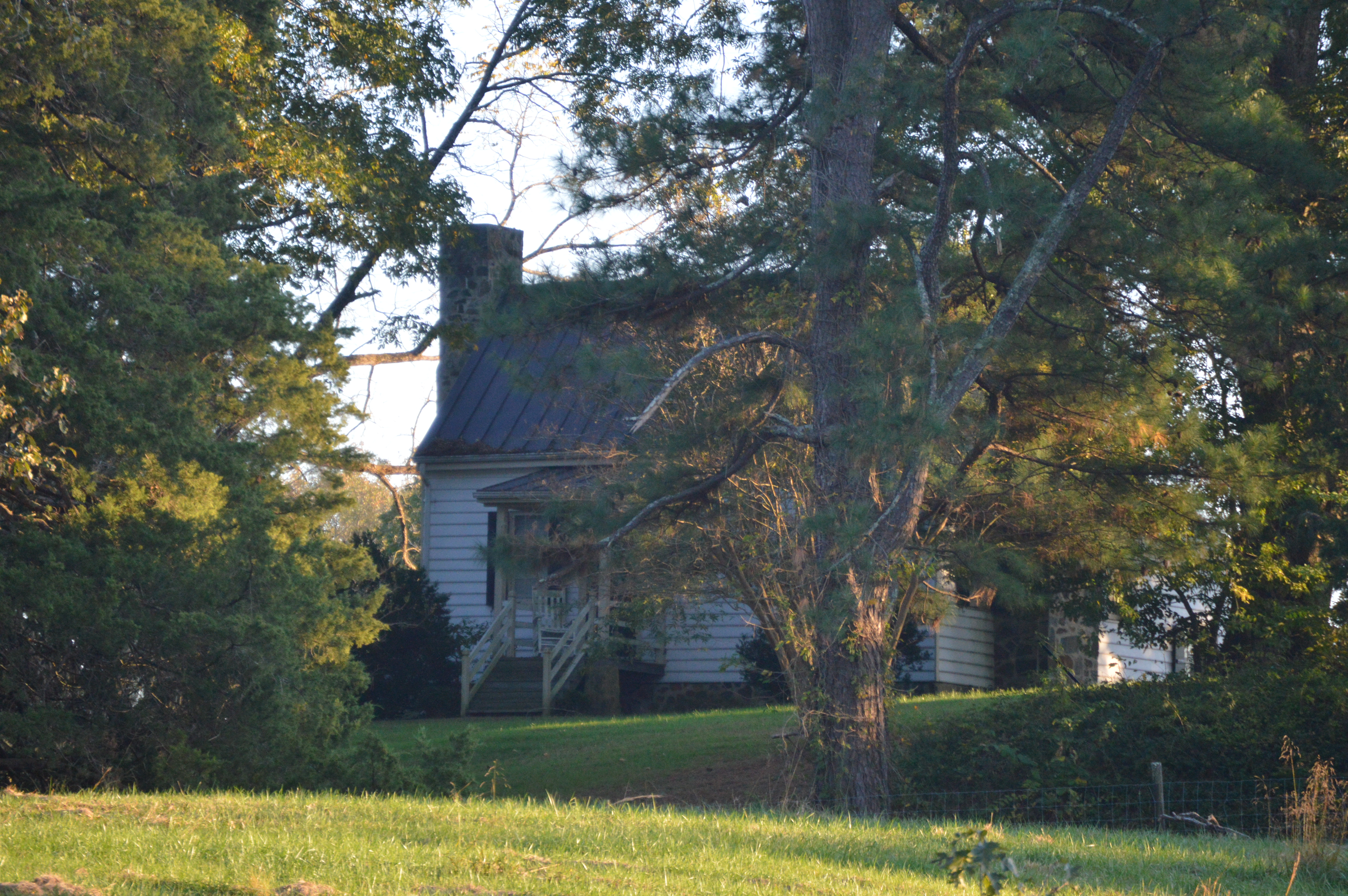
- Roadside view of the house in 2016

- Location within Virginia Location within the United States
- Location: Southern side of Scotland Drive, 1500 feet west of its junction with Orion Road, Jarratt, Virginia
- Coordinates: 36°48′3.5″N 77°33′18″W
- Area: 45.5 acres (18.4 ha)
- Built: 1815-1835
- Architectural style: Federal
- NRHP reference No.: 91000831
- VLR No.: 040-0002

Significant dates
- Added to NRHP: July 3, 1991
- Designated VLR: April 17, 1991

Alexander Watson Batte House, also known as The Old Place, is a historic home located at Jarratt, Greensville County, Virginia. It was built between 1815 and 1835, and is a 1 1/2-story hall-parlor house built on a fieldstone foundation. It features massive fieldstone chimneys flanking the gable roofed dwelling. Also on the property is a contributing 19th century barn.

It was listed on the National Register of Historic Places in 1991.
