= Hicksford–Emporia Historic District =

Historic district in Virginia, United States

- U.S. National Register of Historic Places
- U.S. Historic district
- Virginia Landmarks Register
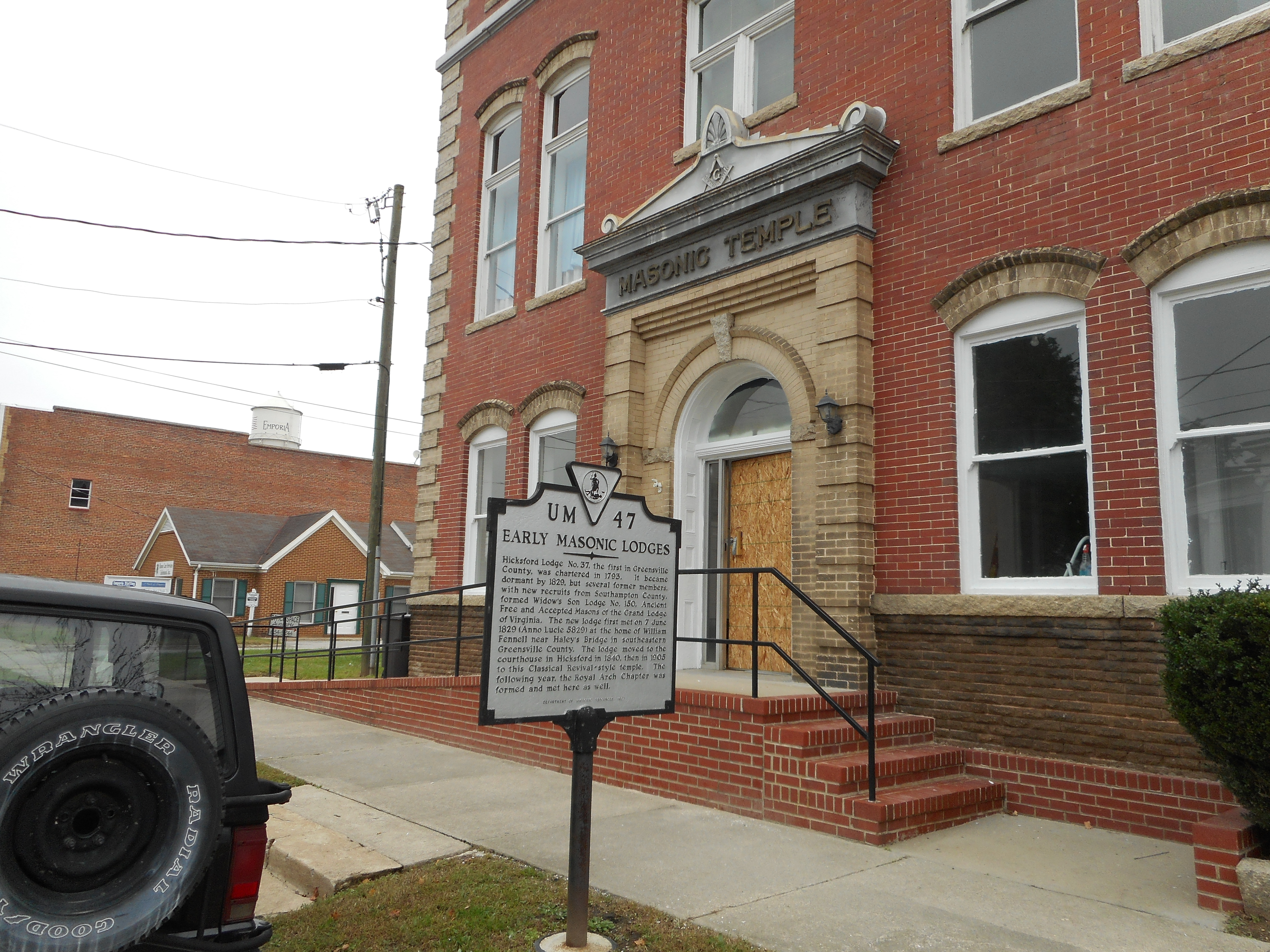
- The Widow’s Son’s Masonic Lodge, one of numerous historic buildings within the district

- Location within Virginia Location within the United States
- Location: S Main St. & Brunswick Ave., Emporia, Virginia
- Coordinates: 36°41′10″N 77°32′34″W
- Area: 19.7 acres (8.0 ha)
- Built: 1887
- Architectural style: Early Commercial, Classical Revival
- NRHP reference No.: 07001217
- VLR No.: 109-0019

Significant dates
- Added to NRHP: November 20, 2007
- Designated VLR: September 5, 2007

Hicksford–Emporia Historic District, also known as Emporia, is a national historic district located at Emporia, Virginia. The district includes 36 contributing buildings and 2 contributing objects in the Hicksford section of Emporia. In 1848, Hicksford was a stop on the Petersburg Railroad. In 1887, the neighboring towns of Hicksford and Belfield merged to form the town of Emporia. The district generally consists of late 19th century or early 20th century, when Hicksford–Emporia began to evolve from a small agricultural outpost to a large commercial and governmental center. Located at the heart of the district is the separately listed Greensville County Courthouse Complex. Other notable buildings include the Citizen's National Bank (c. 1910), the Widow's Son's Masonic Lodge (1905), First Presbyterian Church (1907-1908), Emporia Elementary School (1907, 1925), Emporia Armory (mid-1930s), Greensville County Auditorium (1934), and Emporia Post Office (1938). The Old Merchants and Farmers Bank Building is also separately listed.

It was listed on the National Register of Historic Places in 2007.

== Gallery ==
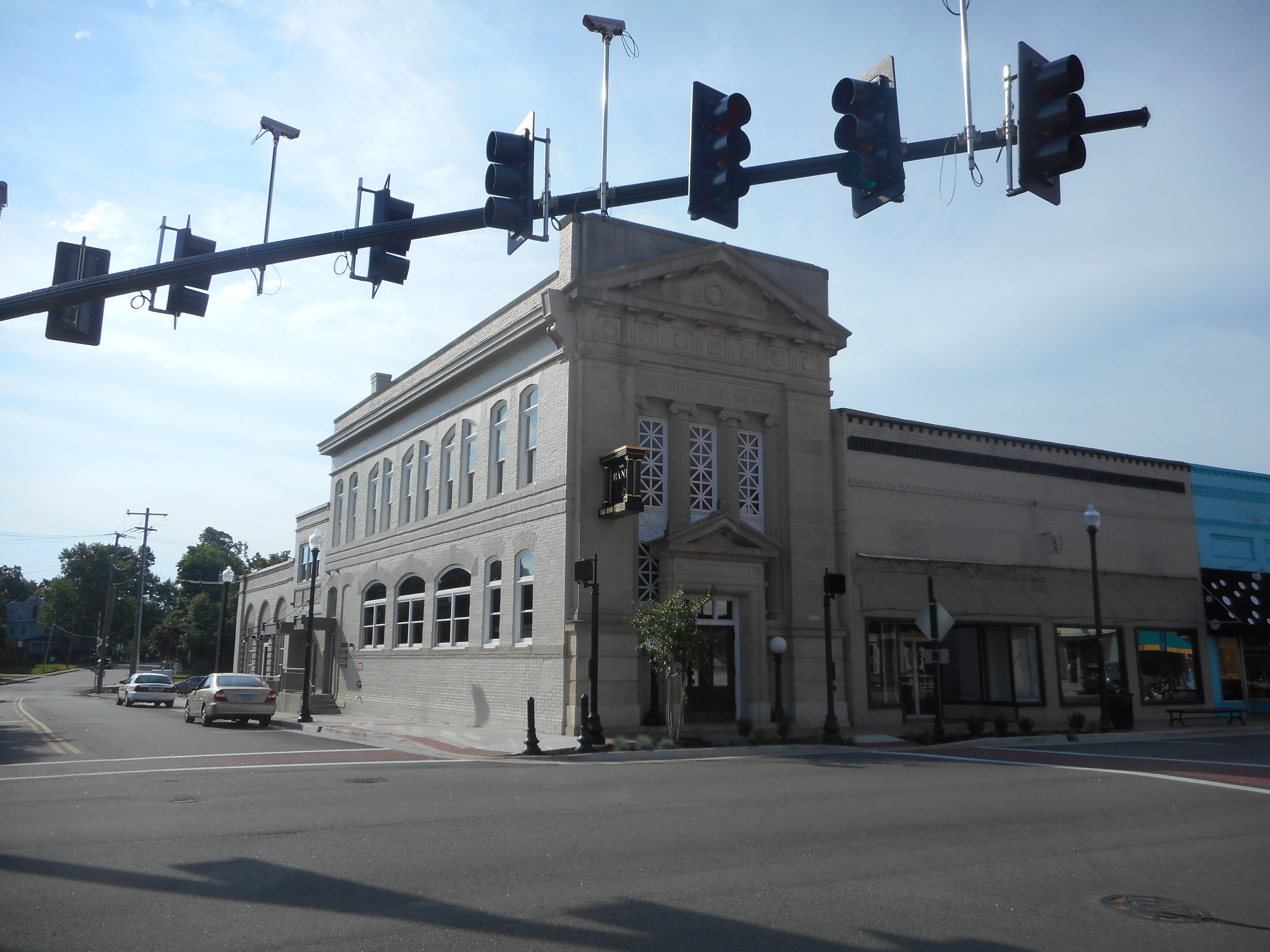
The former Citizen's National Bank

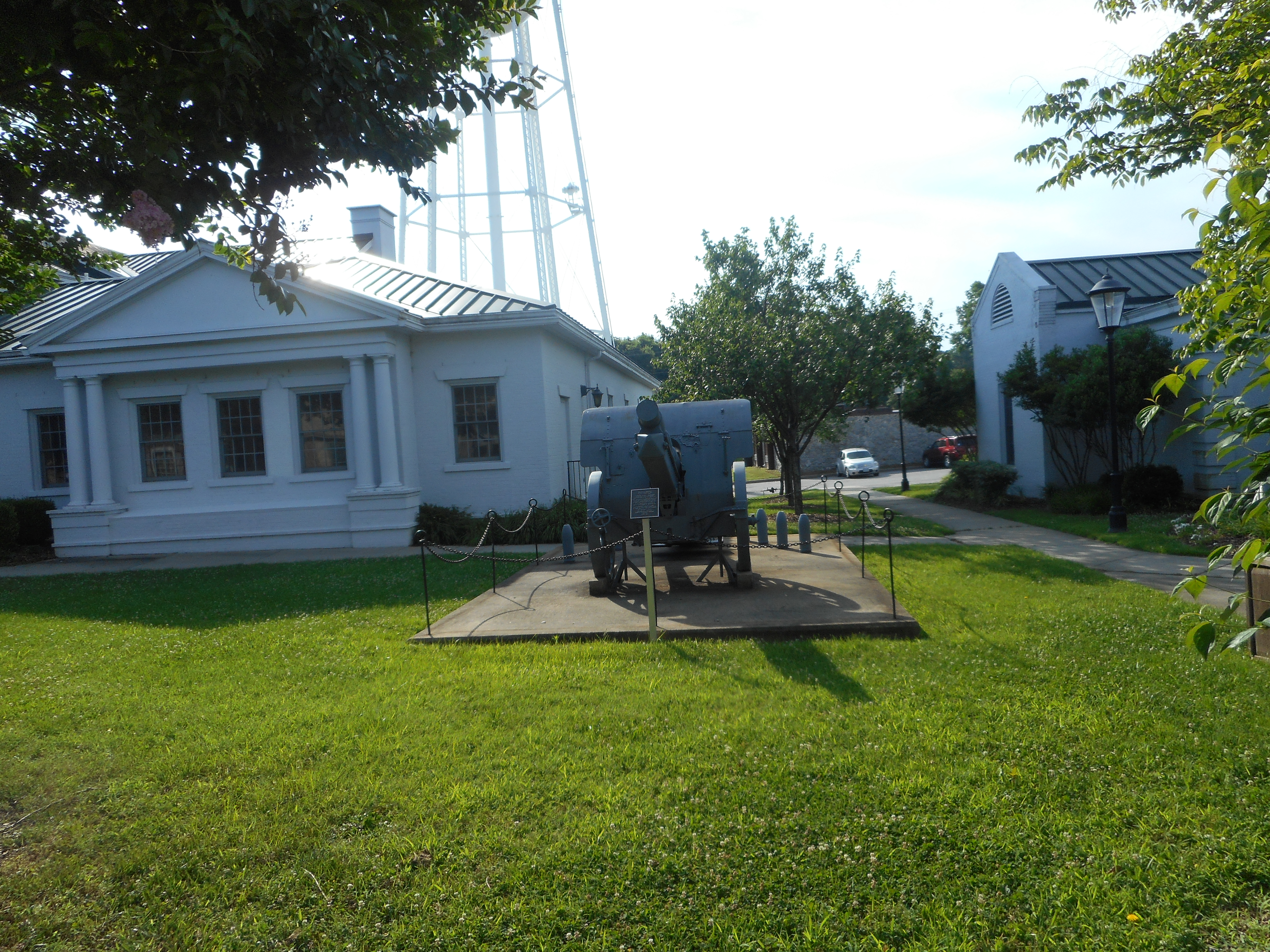
The WW1 cannon in front of the Greensville County Court House

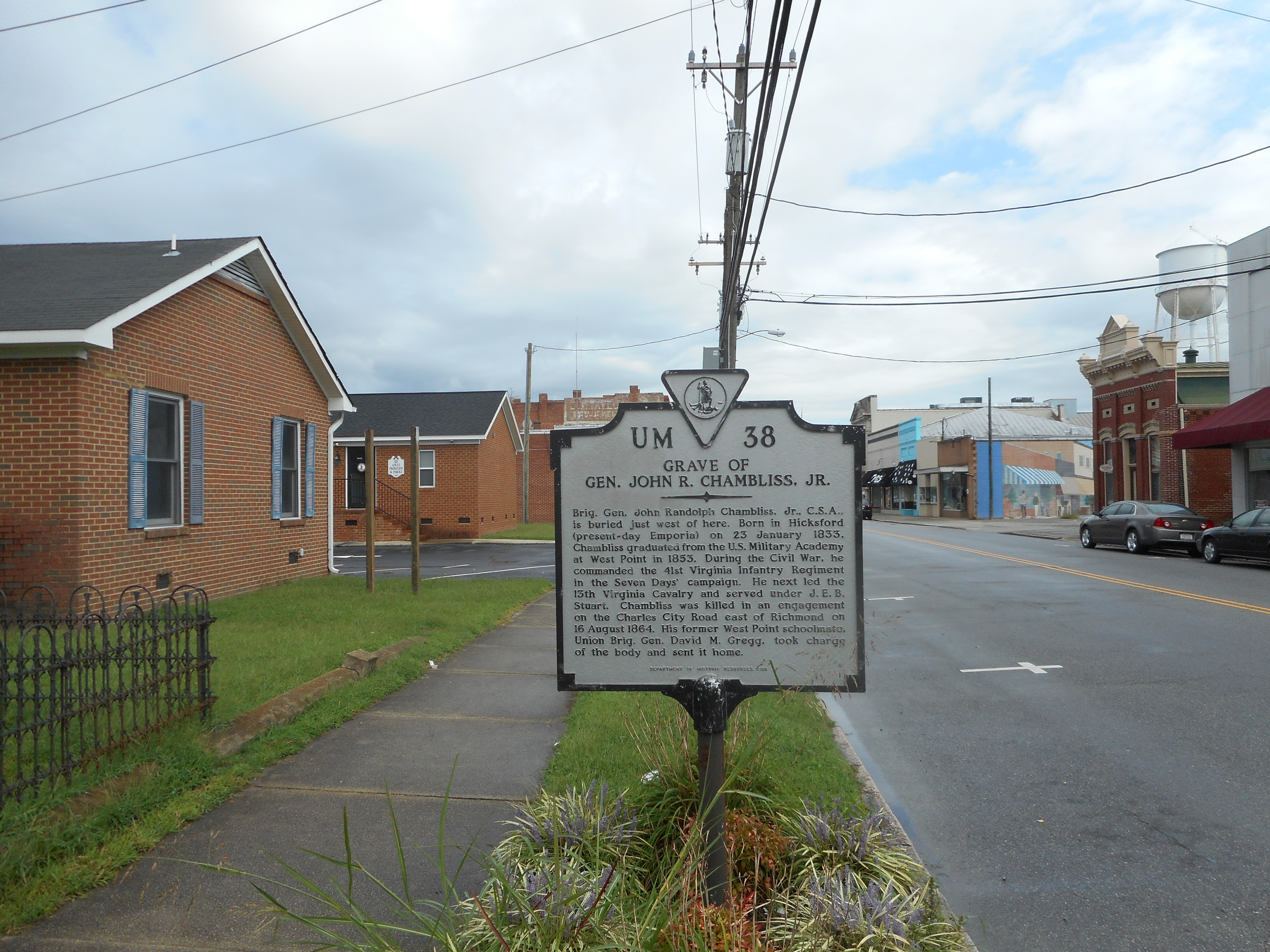
Historic Marker for the grave of General John R. Chambliss

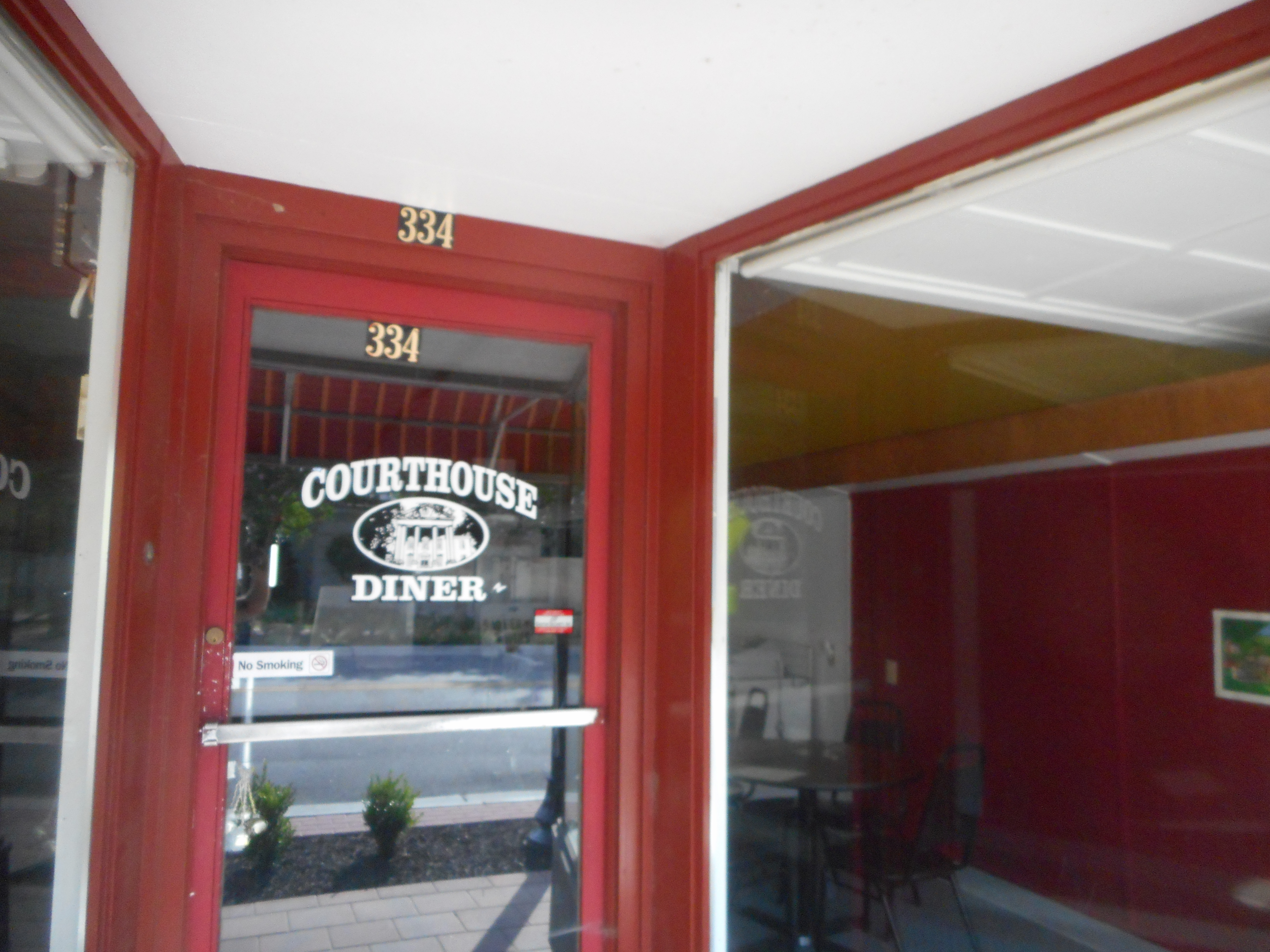
Local restaurant across from the courthouse
