= Village View (Emporia, Virginia) =

Historic house in Virginia, United States

- U.S. National Register of Historic Places
- Virginia Landmarks Register
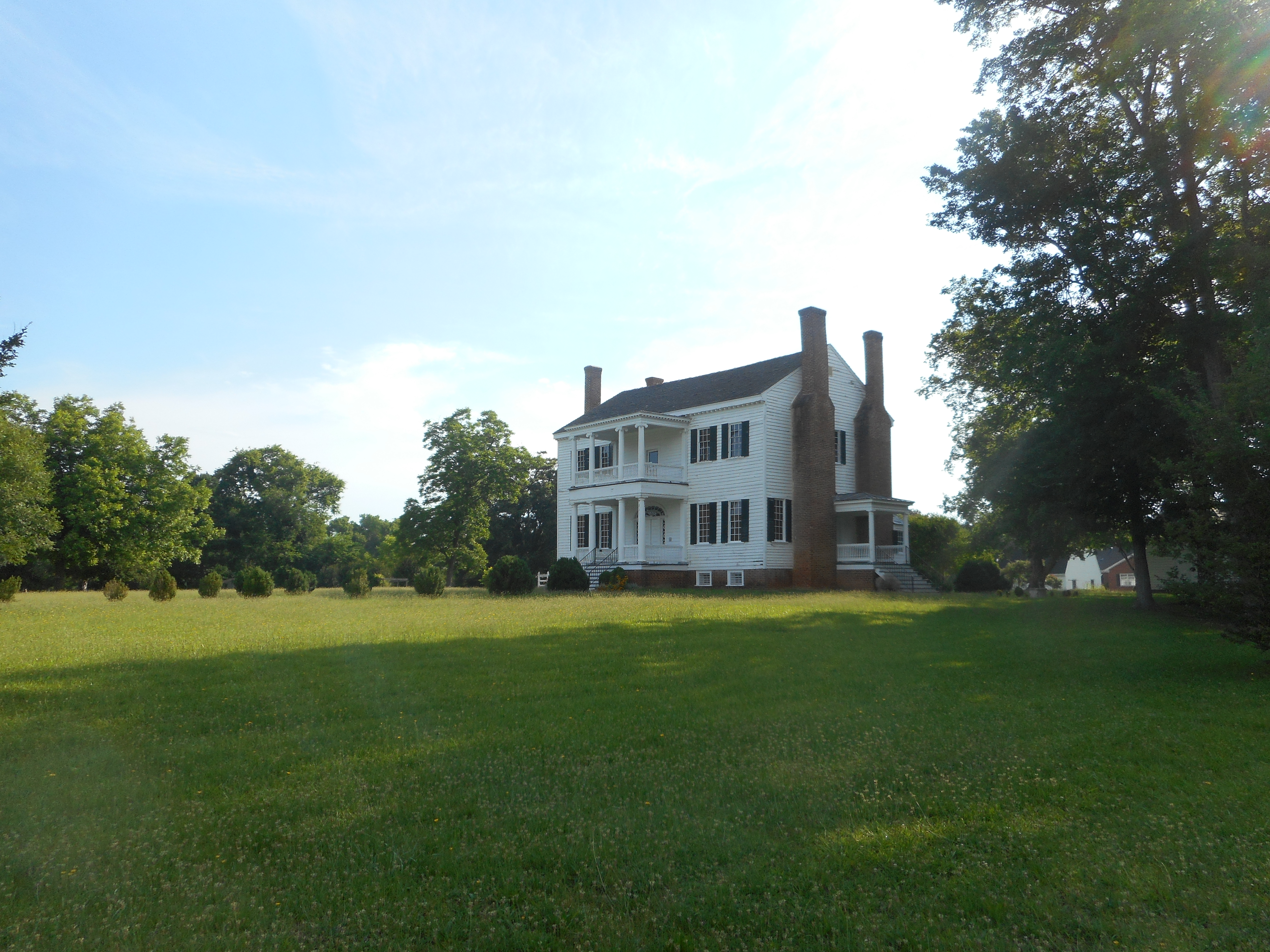
- The Village View mansion as seen from Briggs Street east of US 301.

- Location within Virginia Location within the United States
- Location: 221 Briggs Street, Emporia, Virginia
- Coordinates: 36°40′51″N 77°32′35″W
- Area: 4 acres (1.6 ha)
- Built: c. 1815, 1826
- Architectural style: Adamesque
- NRHP reference No.: 82004554
- VLR No.: 109-0004

Significant dates
- Added to NRHP: September 16, 1982
- Designated VLR: September 18, 1982

Village View, also known as the Mansion House, is a historic home located at Emporia, Virginia. It was built about 1815, and substantially improved in 1826. It is a two-story, double pile, Federal style frame dwelling. It has a two-story rear ell added in the 20th century. It features a two-story front porch and exterior end chimneys. Village View served as a Confederate headquarters during the American Civil War and was used later by the owners of a boys' academy.

It was listed on the National Register of Historic Places in 1982.
