= Greensville County Training School =

Historic building in Virginia, US

- U.S. National Register of Historic Places
- Virginia Landmarks Register
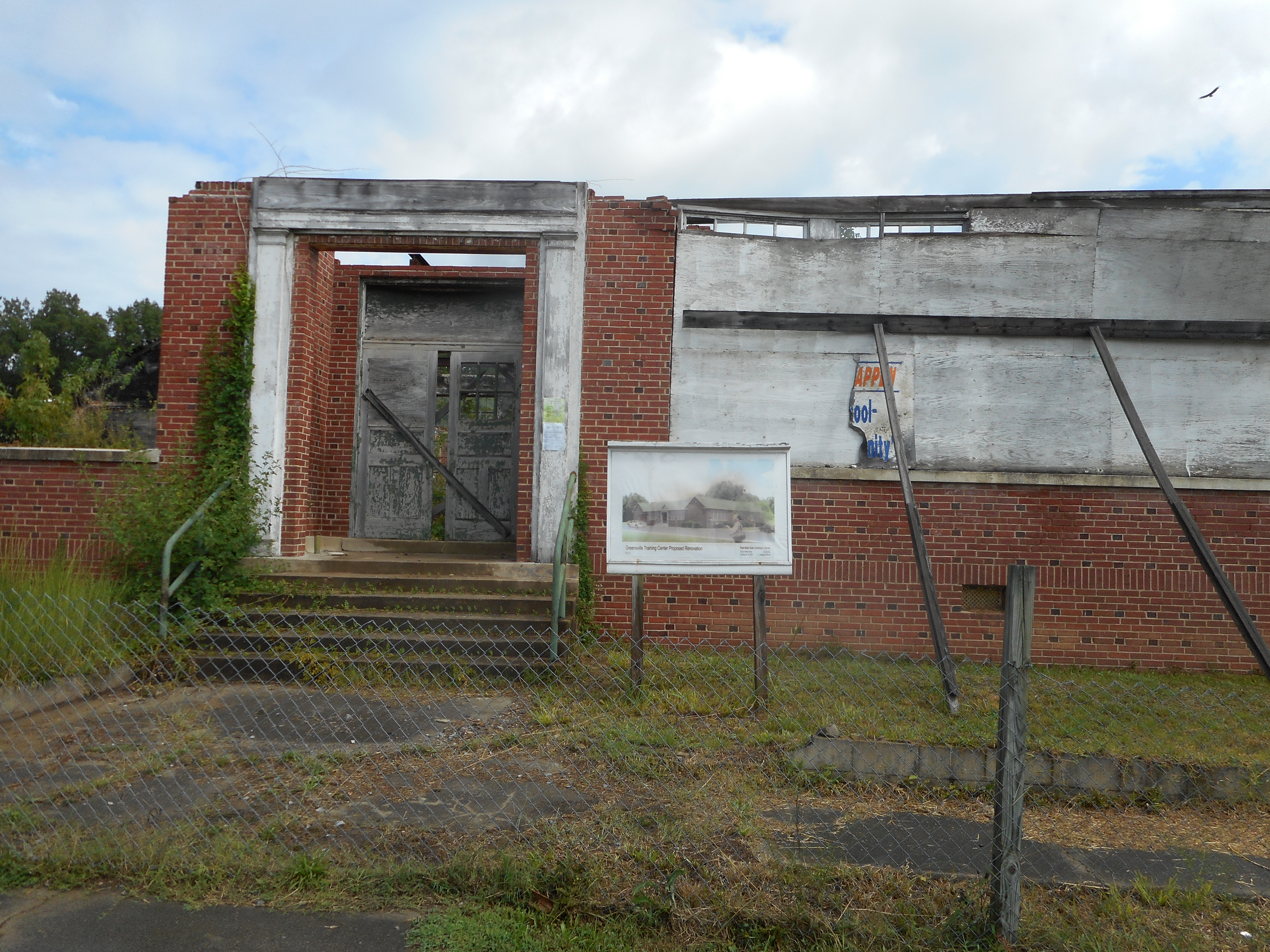
- The ruins of the former Greensville County Training Schools, which the city of Emporia intends to restore.

- Location within Virginia Location within the United States
- Location: 105 Ruffin St., Emporia, Virginia
- Coordinates: 36°41′56″N 77°32′07″W
- Area: 5.5 acres (2.2 ha)
- Built: 1929
- Architectural style: Late 19th And Early 20th Century American Movements
- MPS: Rosenwald Schools in Virginia MPS
- NRHP reference No.: 06000122
- VLR No.: 109-5001

Significant dates
- Added to NRHP: March 8, 2006
- Designated VLR: December 7, 2005

Greensville County Training School, also known as the Greensville County Learning Center, is a historic Rosenwald school building located at Emporia, Virginia. It was built in 1929, and is a single-story, U-shaped brick building. It consists of a front hyphen that connects two wings containing classrooms, while an auditorium, office space, and a library form the interior central space. A classroom addition was constructed in 1934. It was constructed for the education of African-American students, and closed in the 1960s following desegregation of the public schools.

It was listed on the National Register of Historic Places in 2006.

== Possible future ==
After desegregation and the building of the new Greensville County Elementary School in the County, the School Board used the Rosenwald building for storage and the new wing for offices. The Rosenwald portion of the complex fell into disrepair and has since been deeded to a community based preservation group. The condition of the building was so dire that the group undertook selective demolition to save as much of the building as possible.
