= H. T. Klugel Architectural Sheet Metal Work Building =

Historic factory building in Virginia, US

- U.S. National Register of Historic Places
- U.S. Historic district – Contributing property
- Virginia Landmarks Register
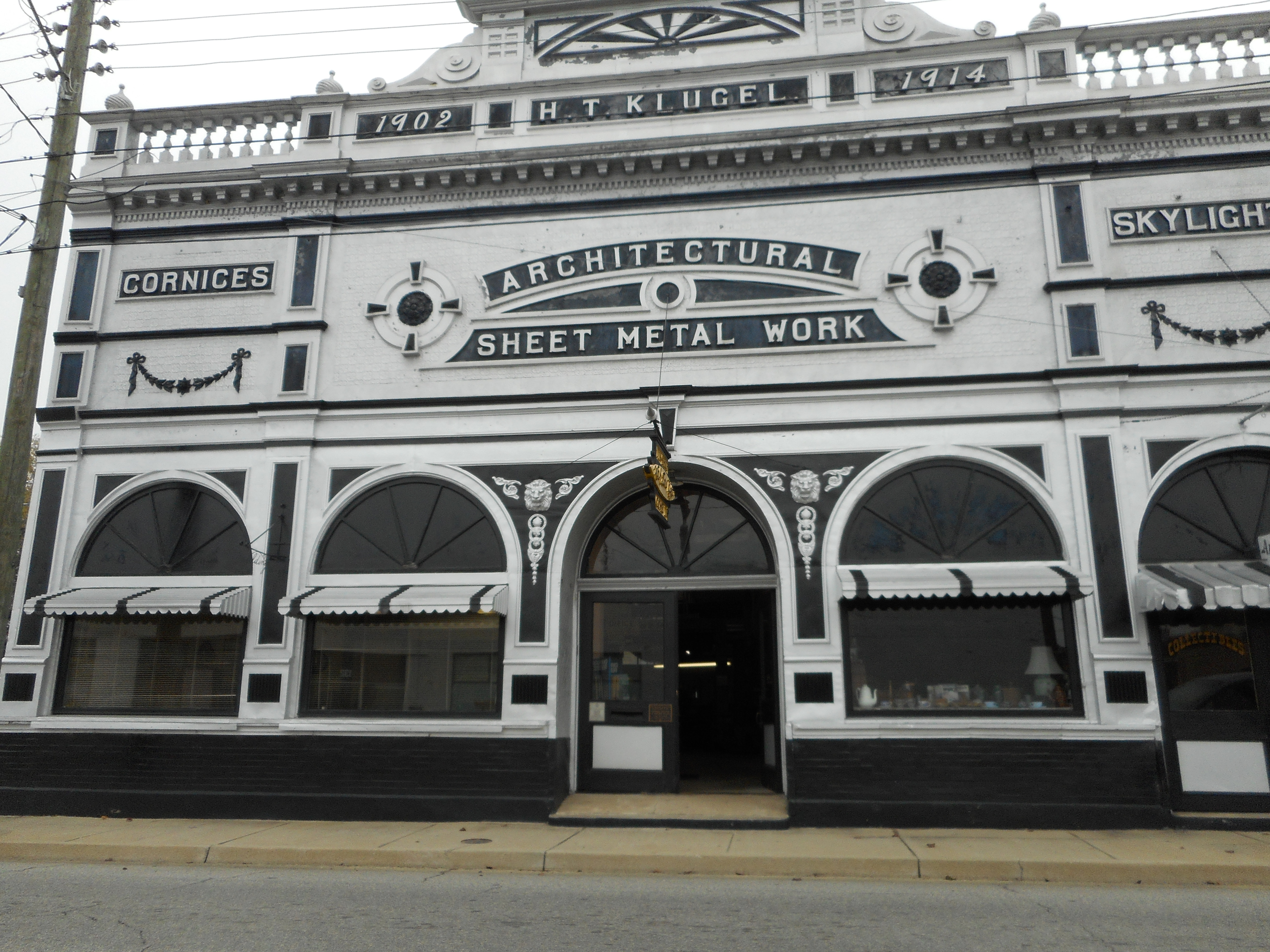
- The former H.T. Klugel building, now an antique store

- Location within Virginia Location within the United States
- Location: 135 Atlantic Ave., Emporia, Virginia
- Coordinates: 36°41′39″N 77°32′12″W
- Area: 9.9 acres (4.0 ha)
- Built: 1914
- Architectural style: Edwardian Classicism
- NRHP reference No.: 73002208
- VLR No.: 109-0005

Significant dates
- Added to NRHP: April 2, 1973
- Designated VLR: November 21, 1972

H. T. Klugel Architectural Sheet Metal Work Building is a historic factory building located at Emporia, Virginia. It was built in 1914, and is a one-story, five bay wide, brick structure with stepped parapets on the sides. The front facade is sheathed in decorative silver and black painted worked sheet metal in an Edwardian Classicism style. It features large rounded arches with a fan tracery filling the top of the arch. It also has a balustrade with pedestals capped by onion domes that top the east and west bays.

It was listed on the National Register of Historic Places in 1973. It is located in the Belfield-Emporia Historic District.
