= National Register of Historic Places listings in King George County, Virginia =

Location of King George County in Virginia

This is a list of the National Register of Historic Places listings in King George County, Virginia.

This is intended to be a complete list of the properties and districts on the National Register of Historic Places in King George County, Virginia, United States. The locations of National Register properties and districts for which the latitude and longitude coordinates are included below, may be seen in a Google map.

There are 15 properties and districts listed on the National Register in the county. Another property was once listed but has been removed.

This National Park Service list is complete through NPS recent listings posted July 10, 2026.

== Current listings ==
	Name on the Register	Image	Date listed	Location	City or town	Description
1	Belle Grove	Belle Grove	April 11, 1973 (#73002029)	On U.S. Route 301; 38°10′45″N 77°11′18″W	Port Conway	Birthplace of President James Madison
2	Ralph Bunche High School	Ralph Bunche High School	May 1, 2006 (#06000353)	10139 U.S. Route 301; 38°16′18″N 77°08′14″W	King George	
3	Cleydael	Cleydael	December 18, 1986 (#86003495)	Off State Route 206; 38°18′47″N 77°08′01″W	Weedonville	
4	Eagle's Nest	Eagle's Nest	October 29, 1992 (#90002160)	Eagles Nest Lane, north of its junction with State Route 218; 38°19′38″N 77°12′04″W	Ambar	
5	Emmanuel Church	Emmanuel Church	January 7, 1987 (#86003593)	U.S. Route 301; 38°10′46″N 77°11′09″W	Port Conway	Built 1860 as the church for Belle Grove
6	Lamb's Creek Church	Lamb's Creek Church	September 22, 1972 (#72001403)	Lambs Creek Church Rd. 38°15′51″N 77°16′08″W	Sealston	
7	Marmion	Marmion	February 26, 1970 (#70000804)	Northeast of the junction of Comorn Rd. and Marmion Ln. 38°18′32″N 77°12′44″W	Comorn	
8	Millbank	Millbank	July 10, 2005 (#04000845)	Millbank Rd., northwest of Port Conway; 38°11′25″N 77°12′00″W	Port Conway	
9	Nanzatico	Nanzatico	November 12, 1969 (#69000250)	South of the junction of Welcome and Salem Church Rds. 38°10′18″N 77°07′30″W	King George	
10	Office Hall	Office Hall	January 24, 1991 (#90002164)	Junction of U.S. Route 301 and State Route 3; 38°14′21″N 77°08′58″W	King George	
11	Powhatan Rural Historic District	Powhatan Rural Historic District	February 20, 1992 (#92000020)	Junction of Powhatan and Port Conway Rds. 38°15′03″N 77°12′37″W	King George	
12	Rokeby	Rokeby	January 20, 2005 (#04001544)	5447 State Route 3; 38°16′25″N 77°14′51″W	King George	
13	St. Paul's Church	St. Paul's Church	May 25, 1973 (#73002028)	West of Owens off State Route 206; 38°19′57″N 77°07′29″W	Owens	
14	White Plains	White Plains	October 15, 2019 (#100003542)	On U.S. Route 301. 38°12′06″N 77°09′58″W	King George	
15	Woodlawn Historic and Archeological District	Woodlawn Historic and Archeological District	January 3, 1991 (#90002012)	Between Salem Church Rd. and the Rappahannock River, east of U.S. Route 301; 38°10′42″N 77°09′51″W	Port Conway	

== Former listing ==
	Name on the Register	Image	Date listed	Date removed	Location	City or town	Description
1	Nanzattico Archeological Site		October 23, 2003 (#03001091)	November 10, 2003	Address Restricted	Index	

== See also ==
- List of National Historic Landmarks in Virginia
- National Register of Historic Places listings in Virginia
