= List of newspapers in Virginia =

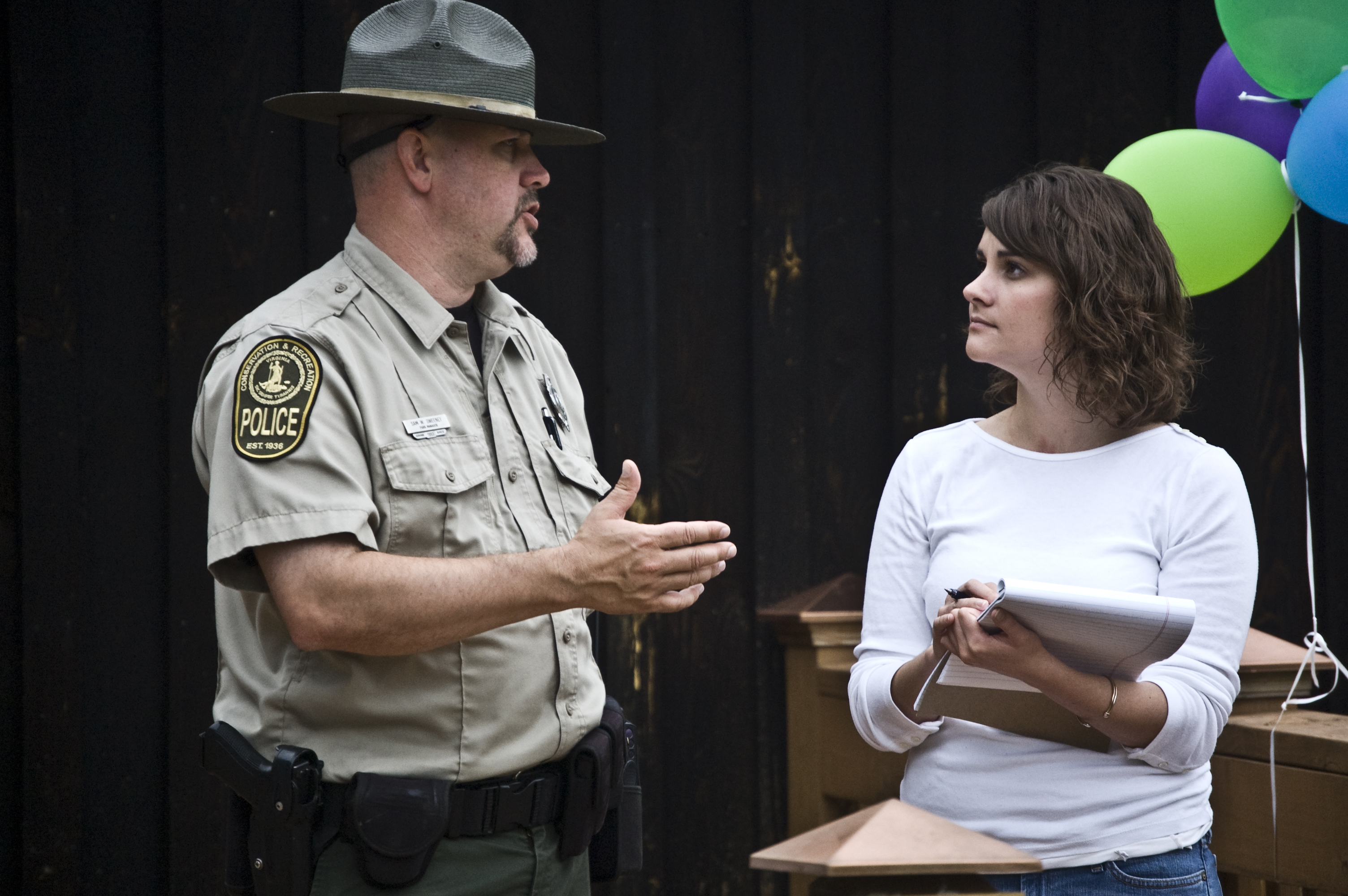
A journalist with the Wytheville Enterprise interviewing a Virginia State Parks ranger in 2012

This is a list of newspapers in Virginia.

== Daily, weekly and other newspapers (currently published) ==
Title	Locale	Year est.	Occurrence	Company	Notes
Alexandria Gazette Packet	Alexandria	1784	Weekly		
Alexandria Times	Alexandria	2005	Weekly		
Altavista Journal	Altavista	1909	Weekly	Womack Publishing Co. Inc.	
Amelia Bulletin Monitor	Amelia Court House	1973	Weekly		
Amherst New Era-Progress	Amherst		Weekly		
Arlington Sun Gazette	Arlington		Weekly		
The Beacon Newspapers	Northern Virginia	1989	Monthly		
Bedford Bulletin	Bedford		Weekly	Paxton Media Group	
Bland County Messenger	Bland County		Weekly		
Bristol Herald Courier	Bristol	1865	Daily	Lee Enterprises	
Brunswick Times-Gazette	Lawrenceville	1894	Weekly	Womack Publishing Co. Inc.	Other
Cardinal News	Southwest and Southside Virginia, "...roughly the western third of the state that is south of I-64"	2021	Daily on weekdays with a weekend newsletter	Cardinal Productions	"a nonprofit, online newspaper that specializes in in-depth reporting of three topics: politics, the economy, and culture ... in Southwest and Southside Virginia"
Carroll News	Hillsville	1920	Weekly	Adams Publishing Group	
The Central Virginian	Louisa		Weekly		
Clinch Valley News	Tazewell		Weekly		
Courier-Record	Blackstone		Weekly		
Culpeper Star-Exponent	Culpeper		Daily	Lee Enterprises	
Daily News-Record	Harrisonburg		Daily		
Daily Press	Newport News	1896	Daily	Tribune Publishing	
Daily Progress	Charlottesville	1892	Daily	Lee Enterprises	
Danville Register & Bee	Danville		Daily	Lee Enterprises	
Dinwiddie Monitor	Emporia		Weekly	Womack Publishing Co. Inc.	
Washington Hispanic	Arlington		Weekly		Spanish language newspaper
Fairfax Sun-Gazette	Fairfax		Weekly		
Fairfax Times	Fairfax County	1965	Weekly		
Falls Church News Press	Falls Church	1991	Weekly		
Farmville Herald	Farmville	1890	Twice weekly		published twice weekly
Flagship News	Norfolk		Weekly	Paxton Media Group	military newspaper serving the Hampton Roads area
Floyd Press	Floyd		Weekly		
The Free Lance–Star	Fredericksburg		Daily	Lee Enterprises	
The Gazette	Galax		Daily	Paxton Media Group	
Gloucester-Mathews Gazette-Journal	Gloucester	1937	Weekly		
Greene County Record	Stanardsville		Weekly		
Henrico Citizen	Henrico County, Virginia		Bi-weekly		published every two weeks
Hopewell Herald–Prince George Post	Hopewell	2018	Twice weekly	GateHouse Media	
Independent-Messenger	Emporia	1893	Weekly	Womack Publishing Co. Inc.	
El Imparcial	Manassas		Weekly		Spanish language newspaper
Inside Business	Norfolk		Weekly	Paxton Media Group	Business newspaper
Loudoun Times-Mirror	Loudoun County and Leesburg	1924	Weekly	Ogden Newspapers Inc.	
Loudoun Tribune	Sterling	2016	Weekly	Brian Reynolds	Circulation: 116K addresses by mail. Loudoun (Website)
Madison Eagle	Madison	1910	Weekly		
Martinsville Bulletin	Martinsville	1889	Daily	Lee Enterprises	
Mount Vernon Voice	Alexandria	2002	Weekly		
New Journal and Guide	Norfolk	1900	Weekly		
News & Advance	Lynchburg	1986	Daily	Lee Enterprises	
News-Gazette	Lexington	1801	Weekly	The News-Gazette Corp.	Began as the Rockbridge Repository 1801
News Leader	Staunton	1904	Daily	USA Today Co.	
News Progress	Mecklenburg County	1884	Weekly	Womack Publishing Co. Inc.	(Website)
News Virginian	Waynesboro		Daily	Lee Enterprises	
The Northern Virginia Daily	Strasburg		Daily	Ogden Newspapers Inc.	
Orange County Review	Orange		Weekly	Lee Enterprises	
The Page News and Courier	Page County	1911	Weekly	Ogden Newspapers Inc.	
Politico	Arlington County	2007	Varies	Capitol News Company	
Powell Valley News	Lee County	1920	Weekly		
Powhatan Today	Powhatan	1986	Weekly	Lee Enterprises	
Prince George Journal	Emporia		Weekly	Womack Publishing Co. Inc.	
Progress-Index	Petersburg	1865	Daily	USA Today Co.	
Purcellville Gazette	Loudoun County	2004	Weekly		
Radford News Journal	Radford		Weekly		
Rappahannock News	Washington		Weekly		
Rappahannock Times	Tappahannock		Weekly		
The Recorder	Monterey	1877	Weekly		
Richlands News-Press	Richlands	1966	Weekly		
Richmond Free Press	Richmond	1992	Weekly		
Richmond Times-Dispatch	Richmond	1850	Daily	Lee Enterprises	
Roanoke Star-Sentinel	Roanoke	2007	Weekly		
Roanoke Times	Roanoke	1886	Daily	Lee Enterprises	
Roanoke Tribune	Roanoke	1939	Weekly		founded by Fleming Alexander
Smithfield Times	Smithfield	1920	Weekly		
Smith Mountain Eagle	Wirtz	1985	Weekly	Womack Publishing Co. Inc.	
Smyth County News & Messenger	Marion		Twice weekly		published two times a week
South Hill Enterprise	South Hill	1906	Weekly	Womack Publishing Co. Inc.	
Southside Messenger	Keysville	2004	Weekly		
Southside Sentinel	Urbanna	1896	Weekly		
Southwest Times	Pulaski	1906	Daily		
Star-Tribune	Chatham	1869	Weekly	Womack Publishing Co. Inc.	
Style Weekly	Richmond	1982	Weekly	VPM Media Corporation	
Suffolk News-Herald	Suffolk	1873	Daily		
Sussex-Surry Dispatch	Emporia		Weekly	Womack Publishing Co. Inc.	
Tidewater News	Franklin	1905	Thrice weekly		published three times a week
Tidewater Review	West Point		Weekly	Tronc, Inc.	
El Tiempo Latino	Arlington	1991	Weekly		Spanish language newspaper
Times-Virginian	Appomattox	1892	Weekly	Womack Publishing Co. Inc.	
Union Star	Brookneal	1906	Weekly	Womack Publishing Co. Inc.	
Virginia Beach Sun	Virginia Beach	2012	Nondaily		
Virginia Gazette	Williamsburg	1930	Twice weekly	Tribune Publishing	published two times a week
Virginia Lawyers Weekly	Richmond	1986	Weekly	GateHouse Media	
Virginian-Pilot	Norfolk	1894	Daily	Tribune Publishing	
Virginian Review	Covington	1914	Thrice weekly		Published three times a week
La Voz Hispana de Virginia	Richmond		Nondaily		
Washington County News	Abingdon		Weekly		
Westmoreland News	Westmoreland County	1949	Weekly		
The Winchester Star	Winchester	1896	Daily	Ogden Newspapers Inc.	
Wytheville Enterprise	Wythe County		Weekly		published two times a week
Yorktown Crier-Poquoson Post	Yorktown		Weekly		
The Zebra	Alexandria	2010	Daily Online	The Zebra Press LLC	Print magazine monthly. (Website)

== University newspapers ==
- Brackety-Ack – student newspaper of Roanoke College
- The Breeze – student newspaper of James Madison University
- The Bullet – student newspaper of the University of Mary Washington
- The Buzz – student newspaper of Shenandoah University
- The Cadet – student newspaper of Virginia Military Institute
- The Captain's Log – student newspaper of Christopher Newport University
- The Cavalier Daily – student newspaper of the University of Virginia
- The Collegian – student newspaper of the University of Richmond
- Collegiate Times – student newspaper of Virginia Tech
- The Commonwealth Times – student newspaper of Virginia Commonwealth University
- The Critograph – student newspaper of the University of Lynchburg
- Fourth Estate – student newspaper at George Mason University
- The Flat Hat – student newspaper of the College of William & Mary
- The Hampden-Sydney Tiger – student newspaper of Hampden-Sydney College
- The Hampton Script – student newspaper of Hampton University
- The Highland Cavalier – student newspaper of the University of Virginia's College at Wise
- Hollins Columns – student newspaper of Hollins University
- The Iron Blade – student newspaper of Ferrum College
- The Liberty Champion – student newspaper of Liberty University
- The Mace & Crown – student newspaper of Old Dominion University
- The Marlin Chronicle – student newspaper of Batten University
- Ring-tum Phi – student newspaper of the Washington and Lee University
- The Rotunda – student newspaper of Longwood University
- Spartan Echo – student newspaper of Norfolk State University
- The Tartan – student newspaper of Radford University
- Virginia Law Weekly – student newspaper of the University of Virginia School of Law
- The Weathervane – student newspaper of Eastern Mennonite University
- The Yellow Jacket – student newspaper of Randolph-Macon College

== Defunct newspapers ==
Title	Locale	Year est.	Year ceased	Notes	
Alexandria Expositor and the Columbian Advertiser	Alexandria, District of Columbia	1802	1805	OCLC 12656722, ISSN 2574-9765	Succeeded by the Alexandria Expositor
Alexandria Gazette	Alexandria	1834	1974	Began as Columbian Mirror and Alexandria Gazette in 1792	
Arlington Daily	Arlington	1939	1951		
Broadside	Fairfax	1963	2013	Former student newspaper of George Mason University	succeeded by Fourth Estate
Caroline Progress	Bowling Green	1919	2018		
Charlottesville-Albemarle Tribune	Charlottesville	1954	1992	Weekly, Published by Randolph L. White. African-American interest publication.	
Charlottesville Tribune	Charlottesville	1950	unknown	Weekly, Published by Roanoke Tribune. African American interest publication.	
Chesterfield Observer	Chesterfield County	1995	2023		
Circuit	Catlett	1937	1954		
Columbian Advertiser and Commercial, Mechanic, and Agricultural Gazette	Alexandria, District of Columbia	1802	1802	OCLC 11551715, ISSN 2574-9757; preceded by The Times and Alexandria Advertiser	
Herald-Progress	Ashland	1881	2018		
Hook	Charlottesville	2002	2013		
Hopewell News	Hopewell	1926	2018	Began as City and Tri-County News	
King George Journal Press	King George		2017		
Ledger-Star	Norfolk	1876	1995	Began as Public Ledger, became Ledger-Star in 1962	
News & Messenger	Manassas		2012		
Northern Virginia Sun	Arlington		1998		
Port Folio Weekly	Norfolk	1983	2009		
Religious Herald	Richmond	1828			
Richmonder Anzeiger	Richmond	1854	18??		
Richmond Chronicle	Richmond	1969	197?		
Richmond Enquirer					
Richmond News Leader	Richmond	1888	1992		
Richmond Planet	Richmond	1883	1938		
The Richmond State	Richmond				
Richmond Whig	Richmond	1824		Began as Constitutional Whig in 1824	
Roanoke Weekly Press	Roanoke	1891	1892	"Roanoke City's first black newspaper"	
Rockingham Register	Harrisonburg	1822	1914		
Scottsville Sun	Scottsville				
Shenandoah Herald	Woodstock	1817		Began as Woodstock Herald in 1817	
Spectator	Staunton	1823			
The Times and Alexandria Advertiser	Alexandria, District of Columbia	1797	1799	OCLC 10210698 ISSN 2574-9730	
Virginian	Lynchburg	1809		Began as Lynchburg Press in 1809	
Washington Examiner	Springfield	2005	2013		
Washingtonian	Leesburg	1808			

== Newspapers by locale ==
=== Alexandria ===
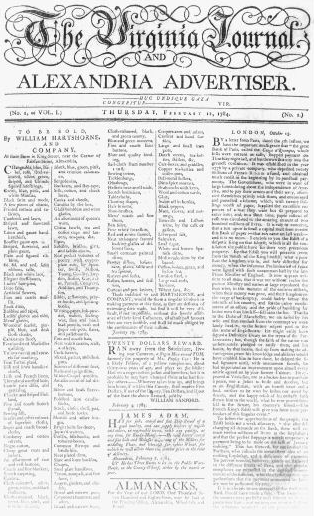
Virginia Journal and Alexandria Advertiser, 1784

Newspapers published in Alexandria, Virginia:

- Alexandria Advertiser and Commercial Intelligencer. D., Dec. 8–31, 1800+
- The Columbian Mirror and Alexandria Gazette. S.W., T.W., Nov. 21, 1792 – Dec. 6, 1800.
- The Times. Alexandria Advertiser. D., Apr. 10, 1797 – Apr. 16 1799.
- The Times; and District Of Columbia Daily Advertiser. D., Apr. 17, 1799 – Dec. 31, 1800+
- The Virginia Gazette and Alexandria Advertiser. W., July 30(?), 1789 – Nov. 1793.
- The Virginia Journal, and Alexandria Advertiser. W., Feb. 5, 1784 – July 4, 1789.

=== Dumfries ===
Newspapers published in Dumfries, Virginia:

- The Virginia Gazette, and Agricultural Repository. W., Sept. 29, 1791 – Dec. 19, 1793.

=== Fincastle ===
Newspapers published in Fincastle, Virginia:

- The Herald Of Virginia, and Fincastle Weekly Advertiser. W., March – Dec. 27, 1800+

=== Fredericksburg ===
Newspapers published in Fredericksburg, Virginia:

- The Genius Of Liberty; and Fredericksburg & Falmouth Advertiser. W., S.W., Oct. 10, 1797 – Sept. 2, 1799.
- The Virginia Herald. S.W., Aug. 23, 1799 – Dec. 26, 1800+
- The Virginia Herald, and Fredericksburg Advertiser. W., S.W., June 7, 1787 – Oct. 16 (?), 1795.
- The Virginia Herald, and Fredericksburg & Falmouth Advertiser. S.W., Oct. 20, 1795 – Aug. 19, 1797.

=== Leesburg ===
Newspapers published in Leesburg, Virginia:

- The True American. W., November 1798–1800(?)

=== Norfolk ===
Newspapers published in Norfolk, Virginia:

- American Gazette. S.W., May 6, 1796.
- American Gazette & General Advertiser. S.W., May 10, 1796 – Nov. 7, 1797.
- American Gazette, and Norfolk and Portsmouth Public Advertiser. S.W., May 7, 1794 – Apr. 30, 1796.
- The American Gazette, and Norfolk and Portsmouth Weekly Advertiser. W., July 18, 1792 – Apr. 30, 1794.
- Epitome of the Times. S.W., Jan. 1, 1799 – Dec. 30, 1800+
- The Herald. T.W., Nov. 9–30, 1795.
- The Herald, and Norfolk and Portsmouth Advertiser. S.W., T.W., Aug. 13, 1794 – Nov. 5, 1795.
- The Norfolk and Portsmouth Chronicle. W., Aug. 29, 1789 – June (?), 1792.
- The Norfolk and Portsmouth Gazette. W., Sept. 9 – Oct. 8, 1789.
- The Norfolk and Portsmouth Journal. W., June 21, 1786 – May 13 (?), 1789.
- Norfolk Herald. T.W., Dec. 3, 1795 – Oct. 31, 1796.
- The Norfolk Herald. T.W., D., Feb. 20, 1798 – Dec. 29, 1800+
- The Norfolk Herald & Public Advertiser. T.W., Nov. 3, 1796 – Feb. 17, 1798.
- The Virginia Chronicle, & C. S.W., Nov. 13 – Dec. 19, 1794.
- The Virginia Chronicle, & General Advertiser. S.W., Apr. 11 – Nov. 10, 1794.
- Virginia Chronicle and Norfolk and Portsmouth General Advertiser. W., July 28, 1792 – Apr. 5, 1794.
- The Virginia Gazette. 1775 – Feb. 3, 1776.
- Virginia Gazette, or, Norfolk Intelligencer. June 9 (?), 1774 – Sept. 20, 1775.

=== Petersburg ===
Newspapers published in Petersburg, Virginia:

- The Independent Ledger, and Petersburg and Blandford Public Advertiser. W., Mar. 6 – May 8, 1793.
- The Petersburg Intelligencer. S.W., June 17 – Dec. 31, 1800+
- Virginia Gazette, and Petersburg Intelligencer. W., S.W., July 6 (?), 1786 – May (?), 1800.

=== Richmond ===
Newspapers published in Richmond, Virginia:

- The American Advertiser.
- The Friend of the People, A Political Paper. Fortnightly, Jan. (?) – July (?), 1800.
- The Observatory, or, A View of the Times. S.W., July 3(?), 1797 – Sept. 10(?), 1798.
- The Press. W., Jan. 6 – Feb. 7(?) 1800.
- The Richmond and Manchester Advertiser. S.W., Apr. 30, 1795 – Nov. 15, 1796.
- Richmond Chronicle. S.W., May 23, 1795 – Aug. 27, 1796.
- Richmond Whig, under various closely related titles, 1828–1888
- The Virginia Argus. S.W., Nov. 19, 1796 – Dec. 30, 1800+
- The Virginia Federalist. S.W., May 25, 1799 – Aug. 2, 1800.
- The Virginia Gazette. W., May 9, 1780 – May 19, 1781.
- The Virginia Gazette, and General Advertiser. W., S.W., Aug. 25, 1790 – Dec. 26, 1800+
- The Virginia Gazette, and Independent Chronicle. W., 1784 (?) – Sept. (?), 1789.
- The Virginia Gazette, and Richmond and Manchester Advertiser. S.W., Apr. 15, 1793 – Apr. 25, 1795.
- Virginia Gazette & Richmond Chronicle. S.W., Mar. 2, 1793 – May 19, 1795.
- Virginia Gazette and Weekly Advertiser. W., Feb. 16, 1782 – Apr. 22, 1797.
- The Virginia Gazette, or, The American Advertiser. W., Dec. 22, 1781 – Dec. 20, 1786.
- The Virginia Independent Chronicle. W., July 26, 1786 – May 6, 1789.
- The Virginia Independent Chronicle, and General Advertiser. W., May 13, 1789 – Aug. 18, 1790.

=== Staunton ===
Newspapers published in Staunton, Virginia:

- The Staunton Gazette, or, The Western Star. W., Feb. 5, 1790.
- Staunton Spectator was being published in 1859
- Staunton Spy. W., Feb. 1793 – Feb. 1, 1794.

=== Williamsburg ===
Newspapers published in Williamsburg, Virginia:

- The Virginia Gazette. 1736–1780.
- Rind's Virginia Gazette. W., May 16 – Sept. 12 (?), 1766.

=== Winchester ===
Newspapers published in Winchester, Virginia:

- Bowen's Virginia Centinel & Gazette, or, The Winchester Political Repository. W., Apr. 1790 – Feb. 19, 1796.
- The Virginia Centinel, or, The Winchester Mercury. W., Apr. 2, 1788 – Apr. (?), 1790.
- The Virginia Gazette, and Winchester Advertiser. W., July 11, 1787 – Apr. 23, 1788.
- Virginia Gazette, or, The Winchester Advertiser. W., Apr. 30, 1788 – Sept. 9, 1789.
- Winchester Gazette. W., 1798 (?) – Dec. 31, 1800+

== See also ==
- Virginia media
  - List of radio stations in Virginia
  - List of television stations in Virginia
  - Media of cities in Virginia: Chesapeake, Hampton, Newport News, Norfolk, Richmond, Roanoke, Virginia Beach
- Journalism:
  - Category:Journalists from Virginia
  - Virginia Commonwealth University Robertson School of Media and Culture (est. 1978), in Richmond
- Virginia literature
U.S. newspapers

Comprehensive

- Lists of newspapers
- List of newspapers in the United States

Frequency

- List of free daily newspapers in the United States
- List of weekly newspapers in the United States

Circulation

- List of international newspapers originating in the United States
- List of national newspapers in the United States
- List of newspapers in the United States by circulation

Foreign language

- List of French-language newspapers published in the United States
- List of German-language newspapers published in the United States
- List of Spanish-language newspapers published in the United States

Specialty

- List of African-American newspapers in the United States
- List of alternative weekly newspapers in the United States
- List of business newspapers in the United States
- List of family-owned newspapers in the United States
- List of Jewish newspapers in the United States
- List of LGBTQ periodicals in the United States
- List of student newspapers in the United States
- List of supermarket tabloids in the United States
- List of underground press in the United States

Other

- List of defunct newspapers of the United States

== Bibliography ==
- S. N. D. North; United States Department of the Interior (1884). "Catalogue of Periodical Publications: Virginia". History and Present Condition of the Newspaper and Periodical Press of the United States. Washington, D.C.: Government Printing Office. OCLC 1850475. (+ List of titles 50+ years old)
- James T. Haley, ed. (1895), "Newspapers: Virginia", Afro-American Encyclopaedia, Nashville: Haley & Florida, hdl:2027/inu.30000029292855, OCLC 219597043
- "Virginia". American Newspaper Directory. New York: George P. Rowell. 1900. pp. 1058+. hdl:2027/umn.31951002273861a – via HathiTrust.
- "Virginia Newspapers in Public Libraries: Annotated List of Virginia Newspapers". Virginia Magazine of History and Biography.
  - Vol. 8, No. 4 (Apr., 1901), pp. 337-346 (Alexandria etc.) JSTOR 4242373
  - Vol. 9, No. 4 (Apr., 1902)
    - pp. 1-11
    - pp. 130-138
    - pp. 289-297
    - pp. 411-413 (Warrenton etc.) JSTOR 4242462
  - Vol. 10, No. 4 (Apr., 1903)
    - pp. 225-229
    - pp. 421-423 (Richmond etc.) JSTOR 4242559
- Van Ness Ingram, John (1912). A Check List of American Eighteenth Century Newspapers in the Library of Congress.
- "Virginia". American Newspaper Annual & Directory. Philadelphia: N. W. Ayer & Son. 1922. pp. 1009+. hdl:2027/umn.31951001295695n.
- Lester J. Cappon. Virginia Newspapers, 1821–1935: A Bibliography with Historical Introduction and Notes. New York: Appleton-Century Co., 1936.
- Federal Writers' Project (1941), "Newspapers", Virginia: a Guide to the Old Dominion, American Guide Series, Oxford University Press, pp. 130–137, ISBN 9780403021956 – via Google Books
- Harrison A. Trexler. "The Davis Administration and the Richmond Press, 1861–1865," Journal of Southern History, 16 (May 1950), 177–195.
- Ted Tunnell. "A 'Patriotic Press': Virginia's Confederate Newspapers, 1861–1865," in William C. Davis and James I. Robertson Jr., eds., Virginia at War: 1864. Lexington: University Press of Kentucky, 2009, 35–50.
