= Lamb's Creek Church (Sealston, Virginia) =

Historic church in Virginia, US

- U.S. National Register of Historic Places
- U.S. National Historic Landmark
- Virginia Landmarks Register
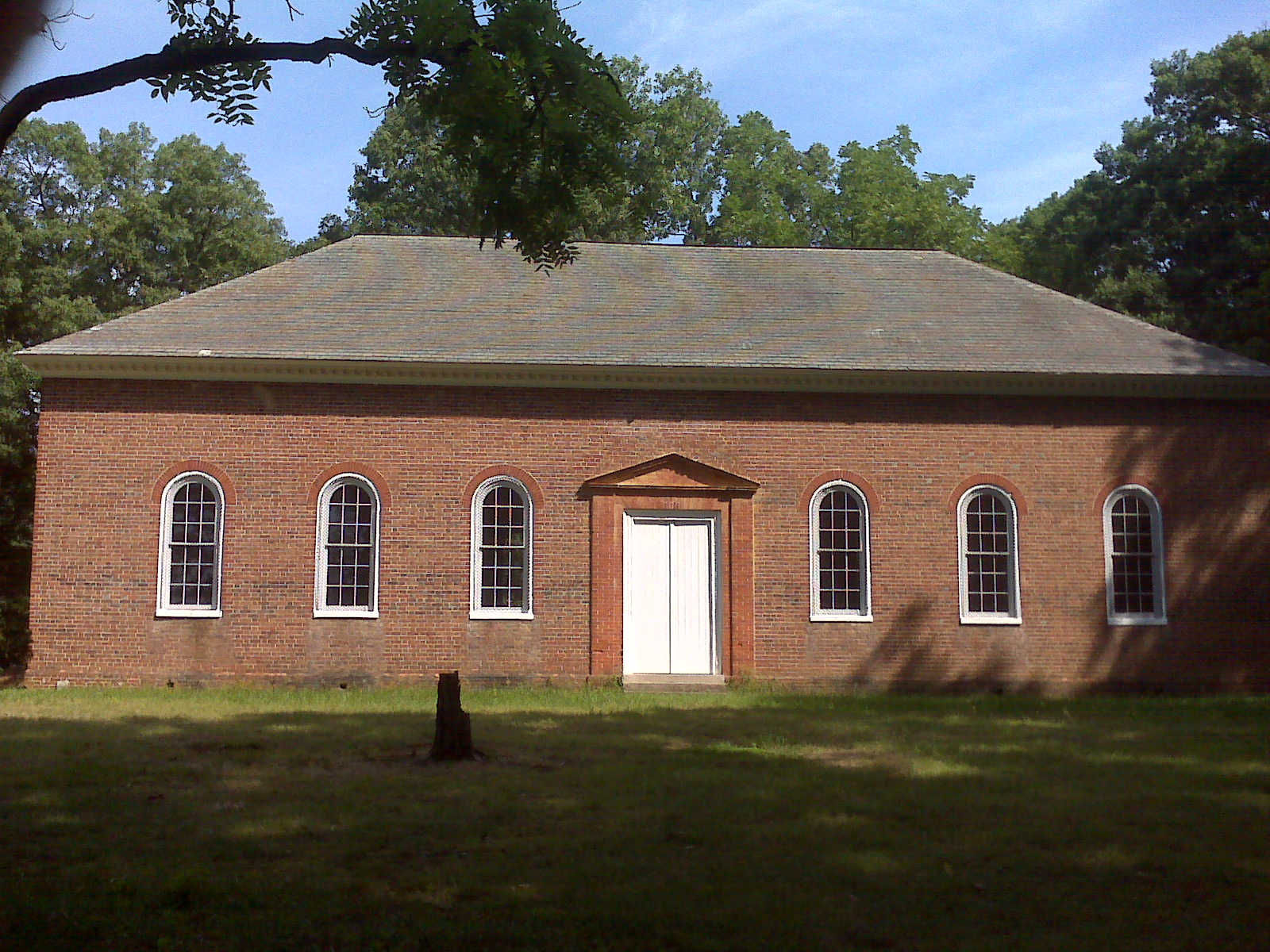
- Front elevation of the church, seen in July 2011

- Location within Virginia
- Location: Lamb's Creek Road, off Route 3 Sealston, Virginia
- Nearest city: King George, Virginia
- Coordinates: 38°15′50″N 77°16′9″W
- Area: 10 acres (4.0 ha)
- Built: 1769
- Architect: John Ariss
- Architectural style: Colonial
- NRHP reference No.: 72001403
- VLR No.: 048-0010

Significant dates
- Added to NRHP: September 22, 1972
- Designated VLR: August 15, 1972

Lamb's Creek Church is an historic Episcopal church located off Virginia Route 3 on Lamb's Creek Road in Sealston, King George County, Virginia, in the United States. On September 22, 1972, Lamb's Creek Church was added to the National Register of Historic Places.

== National Register listing ==
- Lamb's Creek Church ** (added 1972 - Building - #72001403)
- VA 607, Sealston
- Historic Significance: Event, Architecture/Engineering
- Architect, builder, or engineer: Ariss, John
- Architectural Style: Colonial
- Area of Significance: Architecture, Religion
- Period of Significance: 1750–1799
- Owner: Private
- Historic Function: Religion
- Historic Sub-function: Religious Structure
- Current Function: Religion
- Current Sub-function: Religious Structure

== Current use ==
Lamb's Creek Church is still in occasional use and is one of four historic churches in King George County, Virginia. The current mother church of the county is St. John's Episcopal Church near the county courthouse in King George, although ironically it is the only one of the county's historic churches not built in the colonial era (built in 1843 after the courthouse's relocation). It, Emmanuel Episcopal Church (also now with occasional services) and Lamb's Creek Church form the Hanover-with-Brunswick Parish of the Episcopal Diocese of Virginia. The other active parish in King George County is St. Paul's Episcopal Church near Dahlgren, Virginia. Lambs Creek Church is available for weddings and other events. The Episcopalians of King George hold their annual homecoming service at Lambs Creek Church on the last Sunday of August. The slate-floored church is also used annually for blessing of the animals in early October.
