= Journal Press =

Former weekly newspaper in King George, Virginia, United States

- Type: Weekly newspaper
- Ceased publication: January 11, 2017
- Language: English
- Sister newspapers: Dahlgren Source, Chamberlink
- ISSN: 8750-2275
- OCLC number: 11143497
- Website: https://www.journalpress.com

The Journal Press was a weekly newspaper based in King George, Virginia covering King George and Wesmoreland Counties and the Town of Colonial Beach, Virginia. The newspaper's final edition was January 11, 2017.
