= Woodlawn Historic and Archeological District =

Historic district in Virginia, United States

- U.S. National Register of Historic Places
- U.S. Historic district
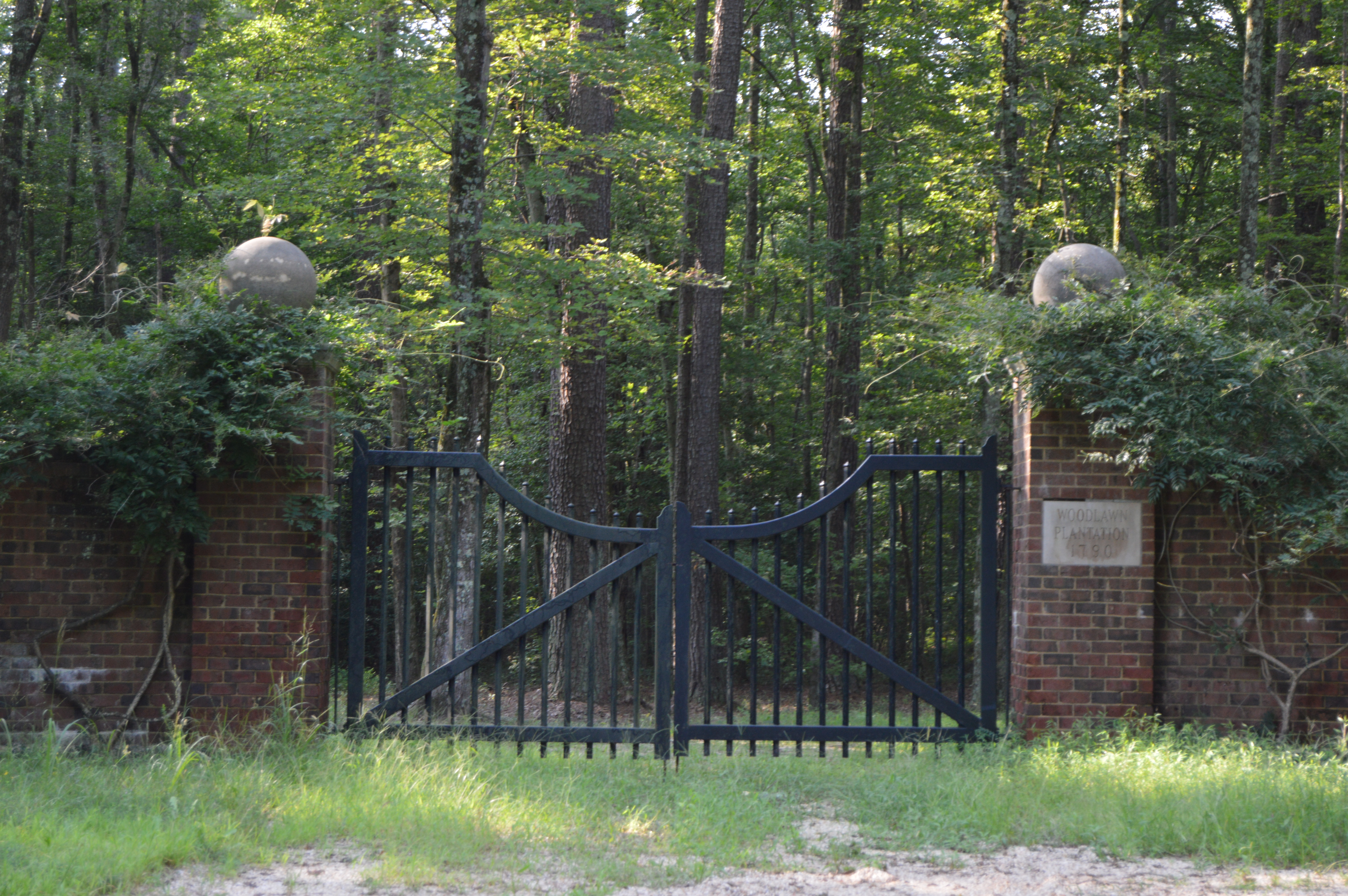
- Gateway to the plantation

- Location within Virginia Location within the United States
- Location: Between VA 625 and the Rappahannock R., E of US 301, Port Conway, Virginia
- Area: 899 acres (364 ha)
- Architectural style: Colonial Revival, Greek Revival, Georgian
- NRHP reference No.: 90002012
- Added to NRHP: January 3, 1991

The Woodlawn Historic and Archeological District encompasses a historic plantation near the Rappahannock River in southern King George County, Virginia. The 899-acre (364 ha) property is located east of US Route 301 near Port Conway. The estate boundaries are essentially the same as those when the plantation was first established in 1790. The main plantation house dates to that time although it has been extended and altered over the intervening centuries. Also of notable interest on this property are surviving antebellum slave quarters, and archaeological sites containing evidence of Native American occupation of the land.

The plantation was listed on the National Register of Historic Places in 1991.

== See also ==
- National Register of Historic Places listings in King George County, Virginia
