= Office Hall =

Historic house in Virginia, United States

- U.S. National Register of Historic Places
- Virginia Landmarks Register
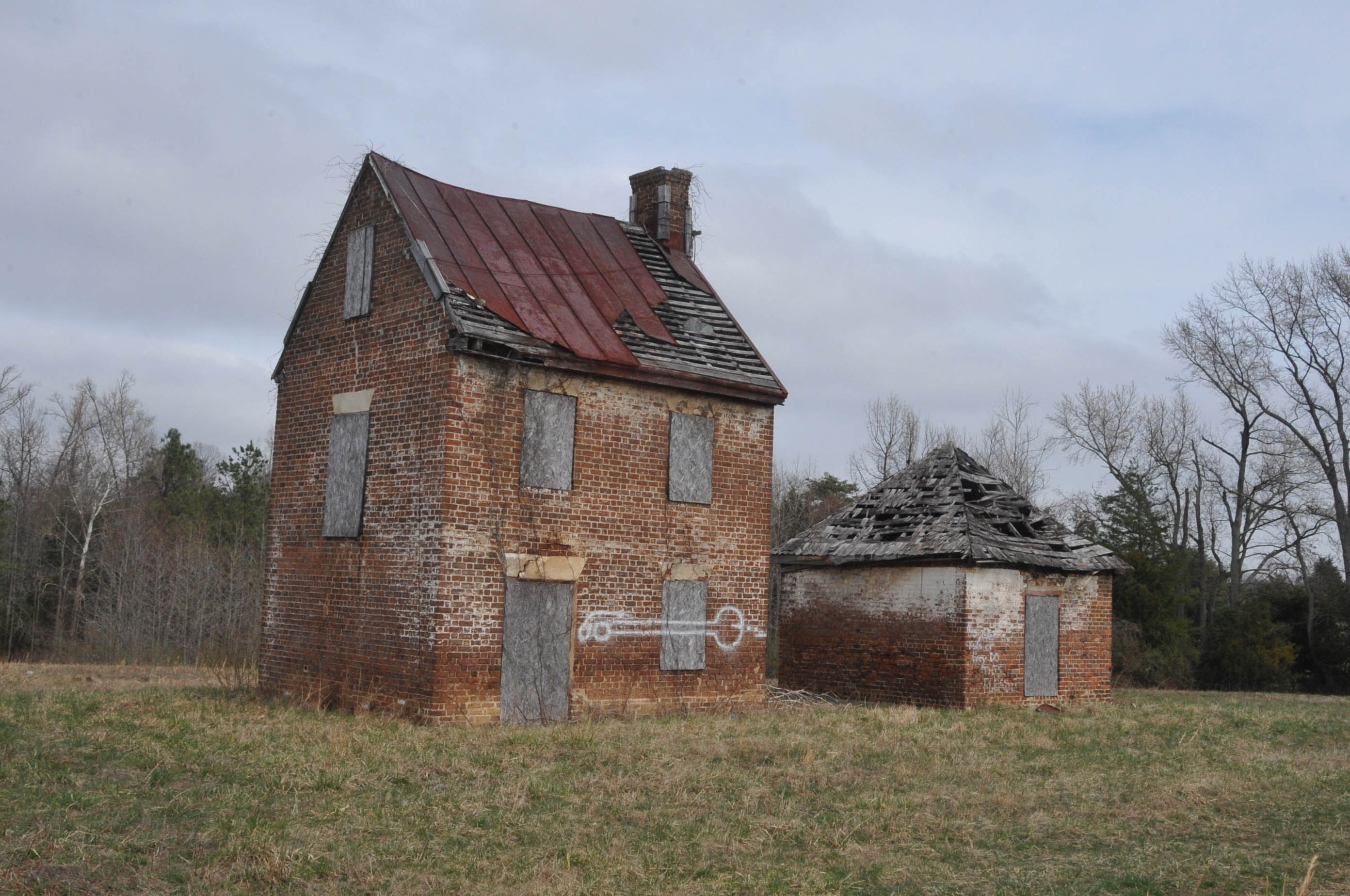

- Location within Virginia Location within the United States
- Location: Jct. of VA 3 and US 301, King George Court House, Virginia
- Coordinates: 38°14′21″N 77°8′58″W
- Area: 0.3 acres (0.12 ha)
- Architectural style: Federal
- NRHP reference No.: 90002164
- VLR No.: 048-0016

Significant dates
- Added to NRHP: January 24, 1991
- Designated VLR: August 21, 1990

Office Hall is a historic plantation house located at King George Court House, King George County, Virginia. The remaining buildings are a two-story detached kitchen, built about 1805–1820, and a large, pyramidal-roofed smokehouse. Also on the property is a non-contributing, commodious two-story frame farmhouse built about 1916–18, and a number of 20th century farm outbuildings.

It was listed on the National Register of Historic Places in 1991.
