= Ambar, Virginia =

Unincorporated community in Virginia, United States

- Unincorporated community
- Location within Virginia and the United States Ambar (the United States)
- Coordinates: 38°19′24″N 77°10′35″W
- Country: United States
- State: Virginia
- County: King George
- Time zone: UTC−5 (Eastern (EST))
  - Summer (DST): UTC−4 (EDT)

Ambar is an unincorporated community in King George County, Virginia, United States.

Eagle's Nest was listed on the National Register of Historic Places in 1992.
