= Rokeby (King George, Virginia) =

Historic house in Virginia, United States

- U.S. National Register of Historic Places
- Virginia Landmarks Register
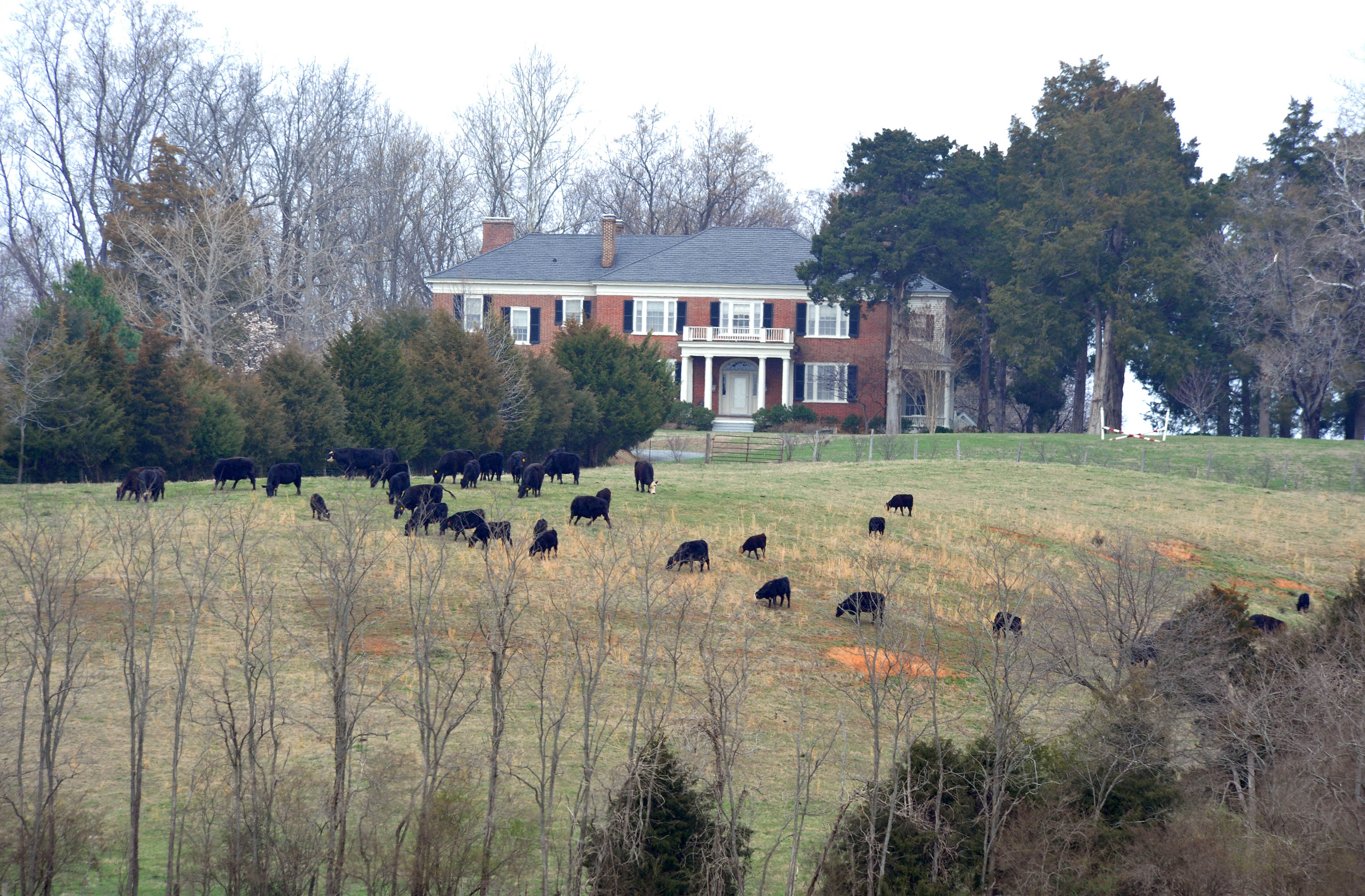

- Location within Virginia Location within the United States
- Location: 5447 Kings Hwy, King George, Virginia
- Coordinates: 38°16′19″N 77°14′51″W
- Area: 50 acres (20 ha)
- Built: c. 1828, 1912, 1917
- Architectural style: Federal
- NRHP reference No.: 04001544
- VLR No.: 048-0019

Significant dates
- Added to NRHP: January 20, 2005
- Designated VLR: December 1, 2004

Rokeby is a historic home located at King George, King George County, Virginia. The original section was built about 1828, and is a two-story, three bay Federal style brick dwelling. It has a low hipped roof, tripartite windows, lintel-type window heads, and an elliptical, leaded-glass fanlight with flanking sidelights. The original block was enlarged about 1912 by a pair of flanking two-story, frame pavilions, and in 1917, the west wing was substantially enlarged. Also on the property are the contributing antebellum smokehouse and a complex of buildings built in 1917-1920: (1) schoolhouse; (2) summer / tenant house; (3) playhouse; (4) garage; (5) Sears, Roebuck catalog-ordered horse barn; (6) sheep barn; and (7) cattle run-in shed.

It was listed on the National Register of Historic Places in 2005.
