= Alexandria Gazette Packet =

Newspaper in Virginia

Alexandria Gazette-Packet is a local newspaper in Alexandria, Virginia. It is a part of the Connection Newspapers group.

The Virginia Journal and Alexandria Advertiser started operations in 1784.

The Alexandria Gazette, for a period, was the longest-established daily newspaper in the United States. In the 1970s, circulation was around 20,000. In that decade, Sing Tao International Inc. acquired the newspaper. That ownership ended in 1986 when the owner of the Alexandria Port Packet and other business persons from the Northern Virginia area acquired the publication. It became a tabloid newspaper in February 1987. In June an announcement came that it was to merge with the Alexandria Port Packet. The consolidated paper, Alexandria Gazette-Packet, was to have two weekly printings instead of seven.

The COVID-19 pandemic in Virginia meant that the newspaper operations became more strained. In 2020 the newspaper ran a crowdfunding campaign for $50,000. In February 2021 it had about 66% of that amount raised.
