= Powhatan Rural Historic District =

Historic district in Virginia, United States

- Powhatan Plantation/Hopyard Plantation
- U.S. National Register of Historic Places
- U.S. Historic district
- Virginia Landmarks Register
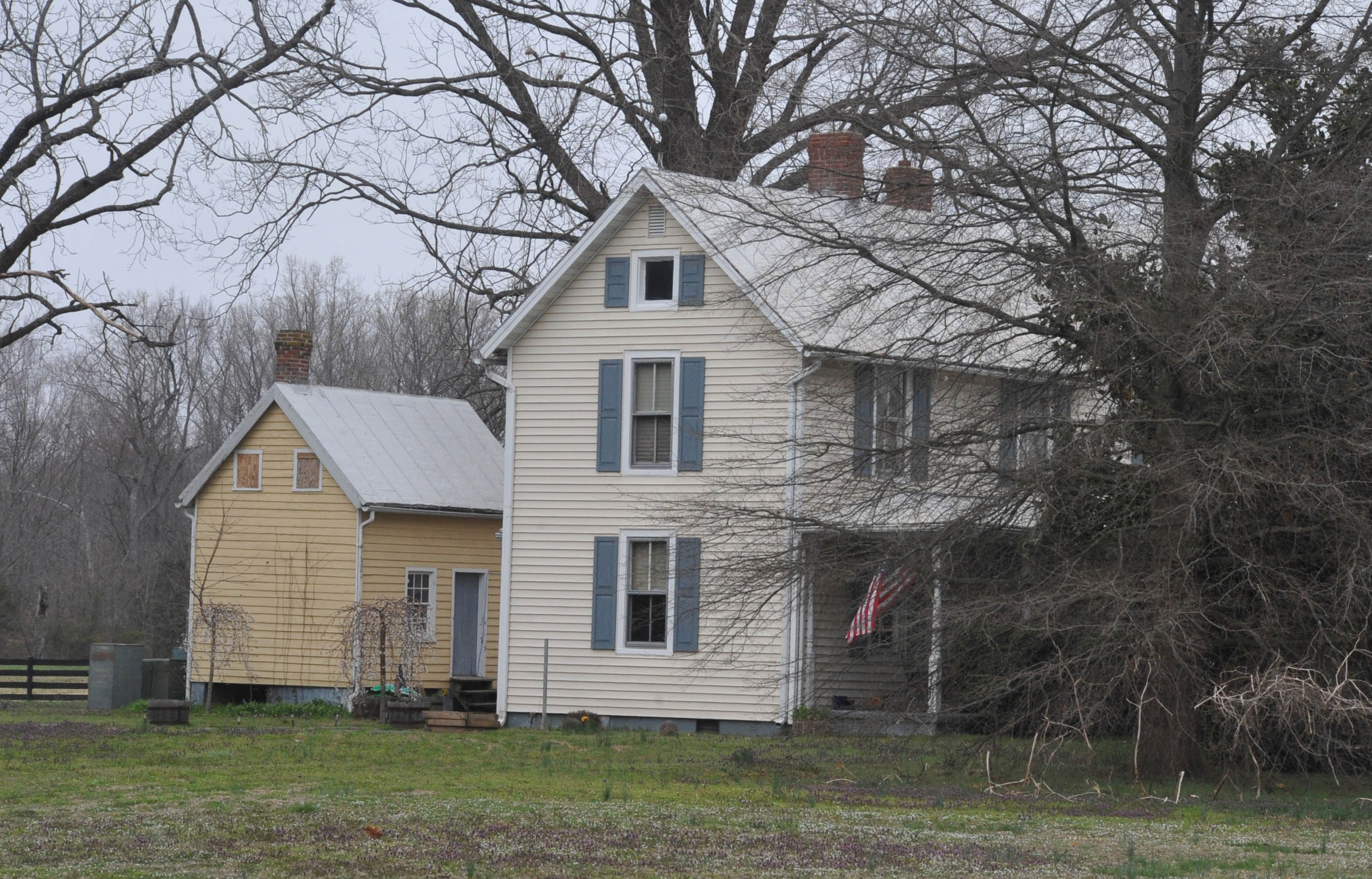
- Farmhouse

- Location within Virginia Location within the United States
- Location: Jct. of VA 607 and VA 610, King George, Virginia
- Coordinates: 38°14′48″N 77°12′32″W
- Area: 1,092 acres (442 ha)
- Built: 1835
- Architectural style: Greek Revival, Federal
- NRHP reference No.: 92000020
- VLR No.: 048-0018

Significant dates
- Added to NRHP: February 20, 1992
- Designated VLR: February 20, 1992

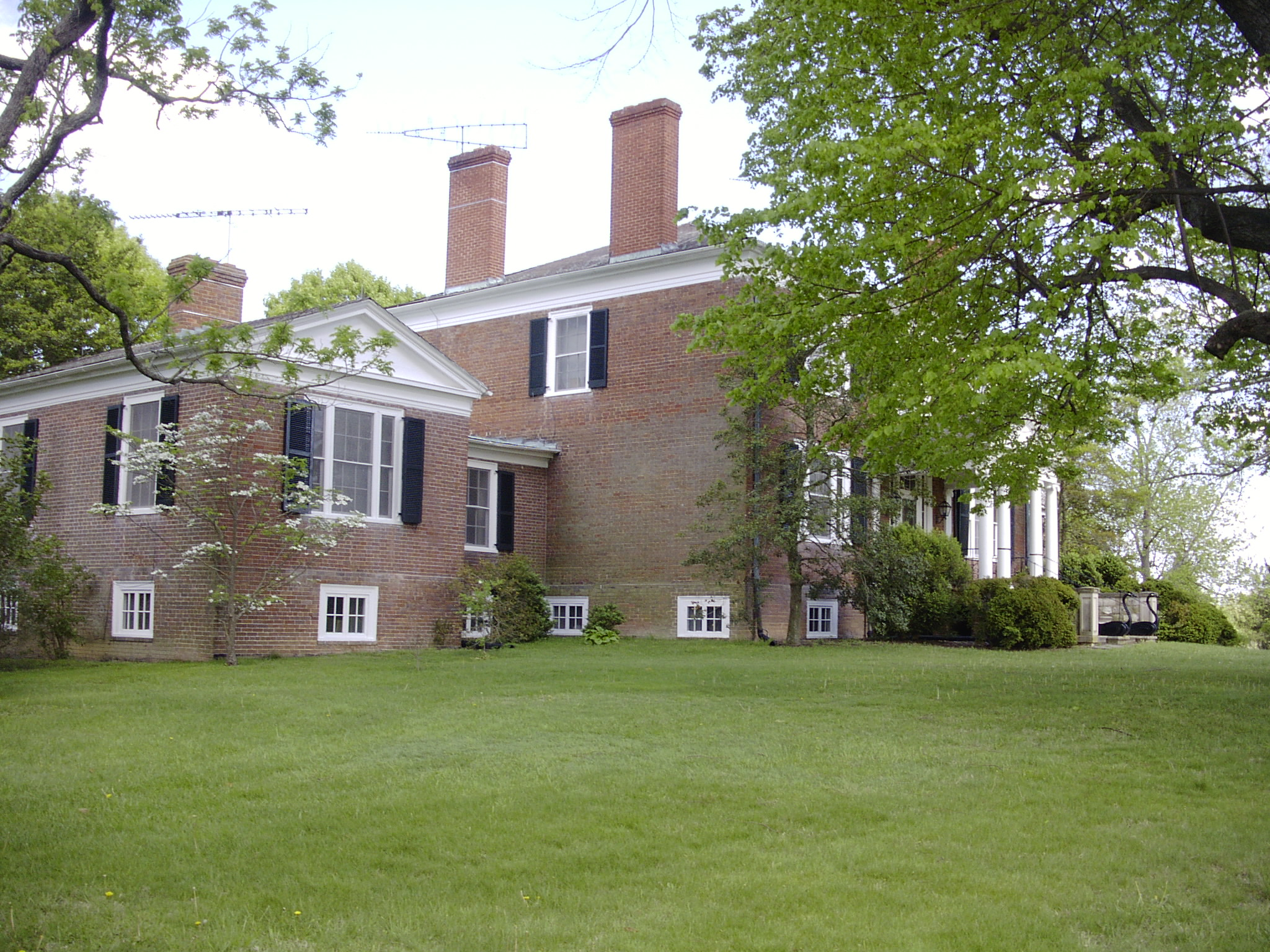
Built by Edward T Tayloe on his father's John Tayloe III former plantation 'Hopyard'

Powhatan Rural Historic District, formerly "Powhatan Hill Plantation" and originally "Hopyard Plantation", is a national historic district located near King George, King George County, Virginia. It encompasses 15 contributing buildings, 1 contributing site, and 3 contributing structures in a rural area near King George. The district represents a significant reassemblage of the land holdings of Edward Thornton Tayloe, a member of the U.S. diplomatic service under Joel Roberts Poinsett, in the mid-19th century and one of Virginia's most affluent planters of that era. He inherited the property from his father John Tayloe III, who built The Octagon House in Washington DC, and previously known as 'Hopyard'. John Taylor III, in turn, inherited it from his father, John Tayloe II, who built the grand colonial estate Mount Airy. The district contains three distinct historic residential farm clusters as well as two post-1950 stable complexes and several other auxiliary residential and agricultural buildings. The main house, known as Powhatan, is prominently sited on a ridge overlooking the Rappahannock River valley.

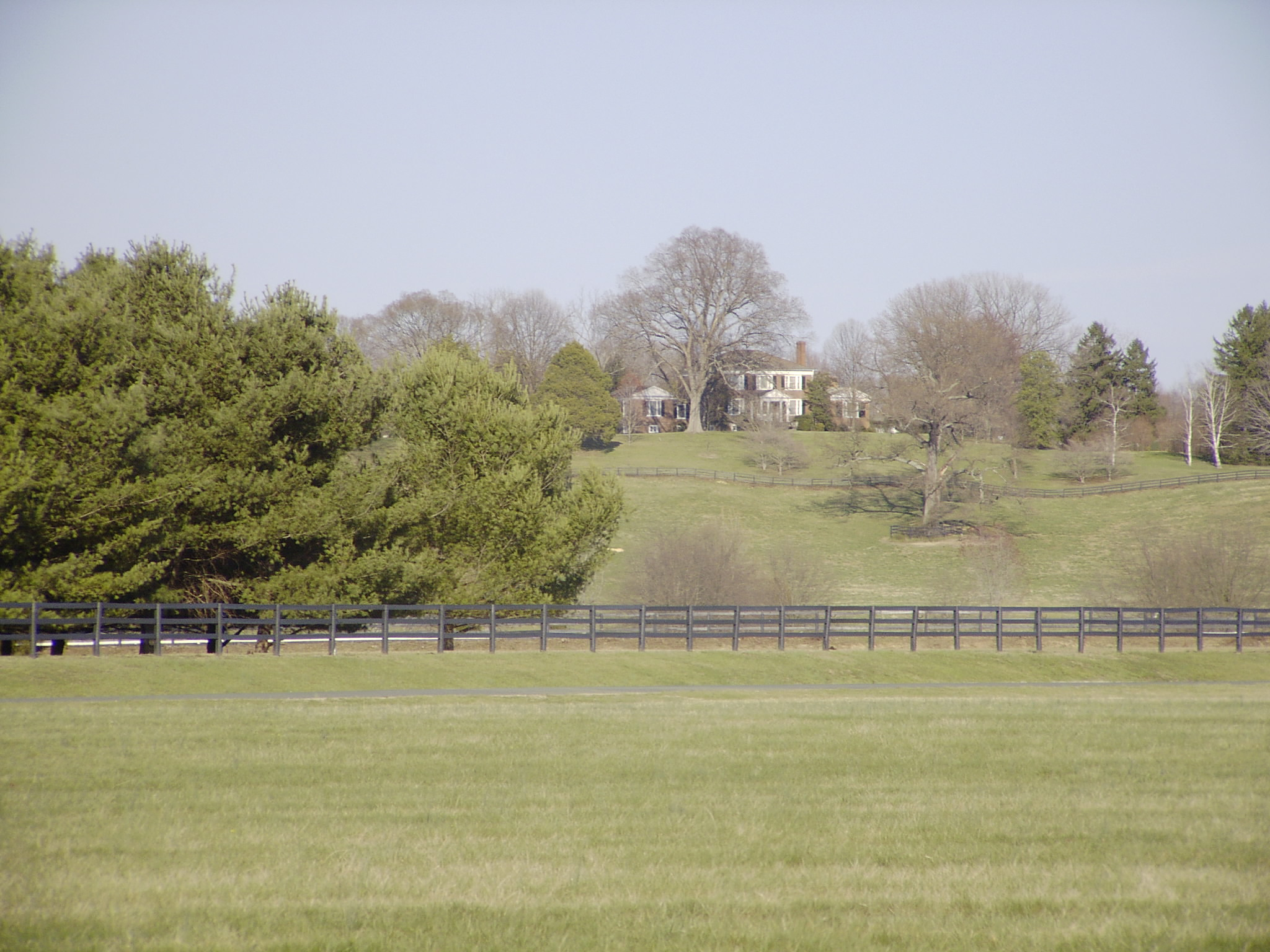
Built by Edward Thornton Tayloe on his father's John Tayloe III former plantation 'Hopyard'

It was listed on the National Register of Historic Places in 1992.
