= Port Conway, Virginia =

Unincorporated community in Virginia, US

- Unincorporated community
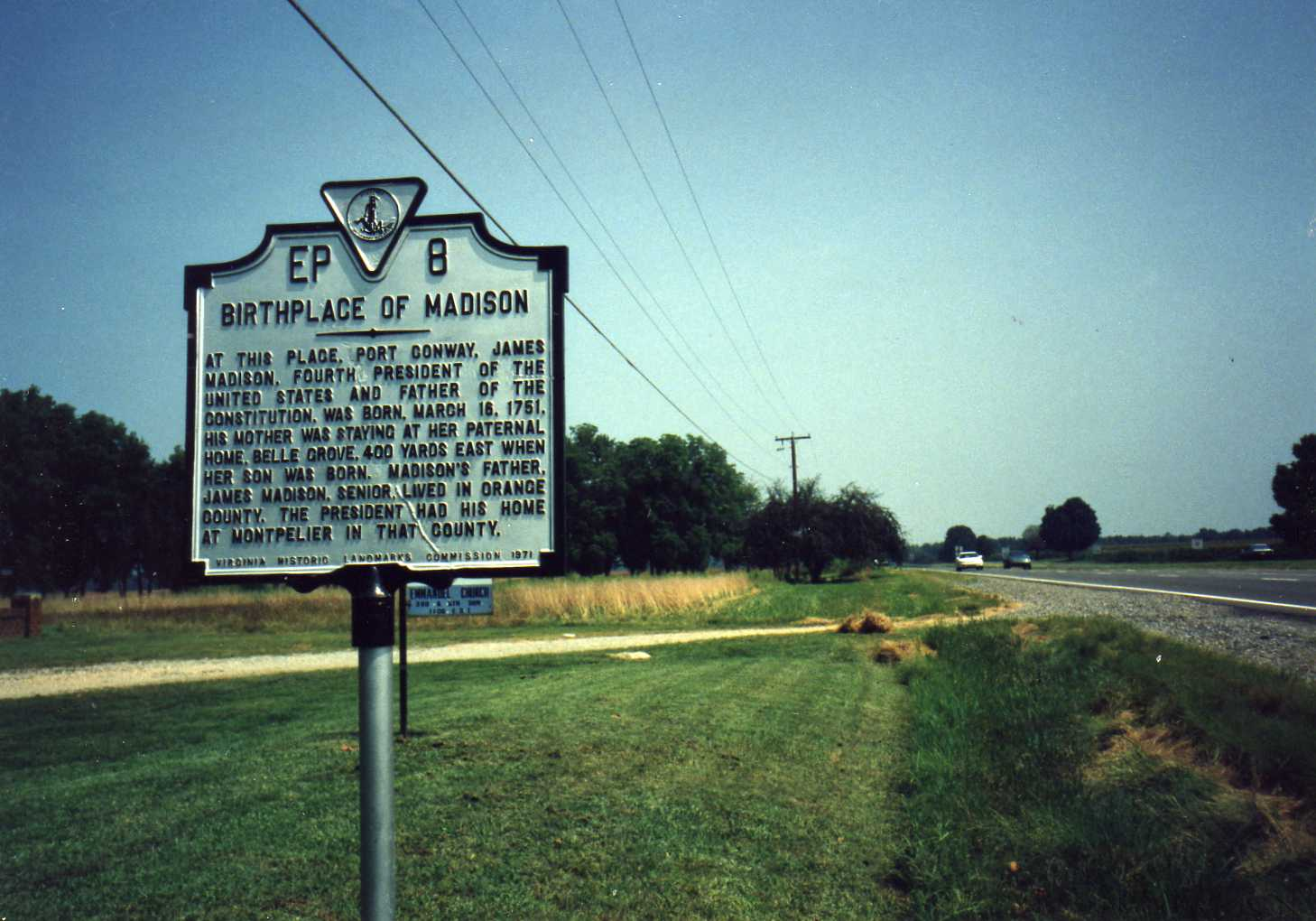
- Birthplace of Madison, historic marker on U.S. 301

- Location within Virginia and the United States Port Conway (the United States)
- Coordinates: 38°10′38″N 77°11′10″W
- Country: United States
- State: Virginia
- County: King George
- Elevation: 43 ft (13 m)
- Time zone: UTC−5 (Eastern (EST))
  - Summer (DST): UTC−4 (EDT)
- GNIS feature ID: 1499897

Port Conway is an unincorporated community on the north side of the Rappahannock River in King George County, in the Northern Neck of Virginia, United States. It is opposite Port Royal, which is on the south side of the river in Caroline County.

James Madison, the fourth President of the United States, was born in Port Conway on March 16, 1751, at Belle Grove plantation. The plantation was the childhood home of his mother, Eleanor Rose "Nelly" Conway, the daughter of its owner, Francis Conway, for whom Port Conway was named.

On April 26, 1865, after assassinating President Abraham Lincoln, John Wilkes Booth and his traveling companion David Herold, with Union cavalry in pursuit, crossed the Rappahannock River at Port Conway. The cavalry caught up with them at Garrett's Farm, south of Port Royal, where Herold surrendered and Booth was killed.

In addition to Belle Grove, the Emmanuel Episcopal Church, Millbank, and Woodlawn Historic and Archeological District are listed on the National Register of Historic Places.

== See also ==
- Northern Neck George Washington Birthplace American Viticultural Area.
