= Westmoreland News =

- Type: Weekly newspaper
- Owner(s): Lakeway Publishers of VA
- Publisher: Cathy Gerring
- Editor: Michelee Smith
- Founded: 1949
- Headquarters: 132 Court Circle, Warsaw, VA 22572
- Circulation: 2,797 (as of 2021)
- Website: newsontheneck.com

The Westmoreland News is a weekly newspaper serving Westmoreland County, Virginia.

== History ==
Founded in 1949 with the motto, "Serving the largest population in the Northern Neck", it was originally published by Tidewater Weeklies of Bowling Green. Its office is at 15885B King's Highway in Montross, Virginia.

The newspaper was acquired from Northern Neck Newspaper Group in August 2007 by Lakeway Publishers of Norristown, Tennessee, which owns 24 newspapers in Tennessee, Missouri and Virginia as of 2008.

In April 2018 it made headlines after printing a flier from the local KKK chapter on its front page.
