= Eagle's Nest (Ambar, Virginia) =

Historic house in Virginia, United States

- U.S. National Register of Historic Places
- Virginia Landmarks Register
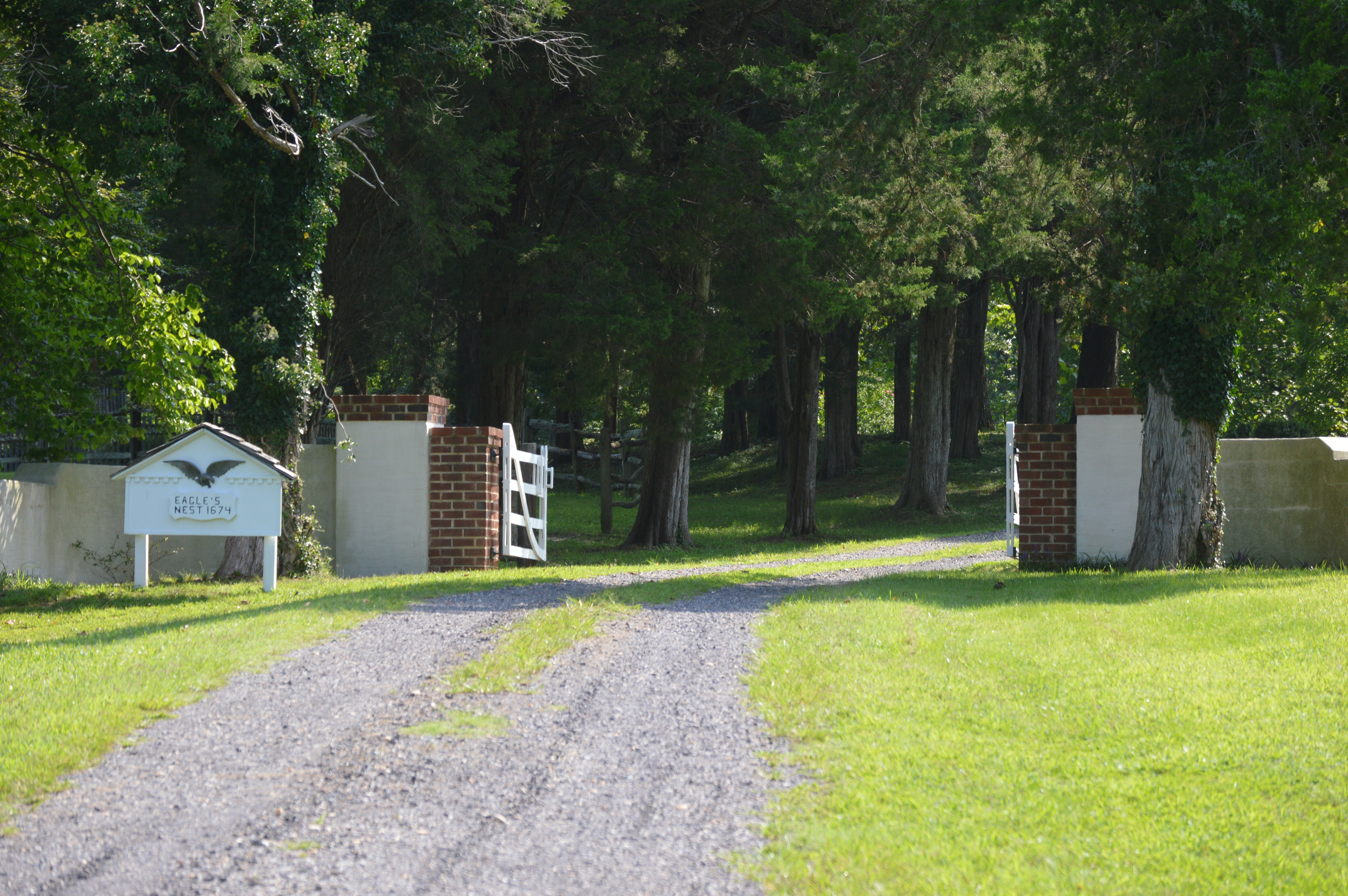
- Gateway to the property

- Location within Virginia Location within the United States
- Location: VA 642 E of jct. of VA 218 and VA 682, near Ambar, Virginia
- Coordinates: 38.327173°N 77.201224°W
- Area: 45 acres (18 ha)
- Architectural style: Early Republic, Greek Revival, Late Victorian
- NRHP reference No.: 90002160
- VLR No.: 048-0044

Significant dates
- Added to NRHP: October 29, 1992
- Designated VLR: December 12, 1989

Eagle's Nest is a historic home located near Ambar, King George County, Virginia. It dates to the mid-19th century, and is a two-story, rectangular, seven-bay house of timber-frame construction. It measures 80 feet long and 36 feet deep and was built in four phases. The house was built on the foundation of an earlier dwelling. Also on the property are the contributing frame, three-bay, single pile, late-18th century dwelling called Indian Town House, moved to the site in 1989; the remains of an old icehouse; and a family cemetery, which holds the graves of several descendants of William Fitzhugh (1651-1701).

It was listed on the National Register of Historic Places in 1992.
