= Orange County Review =

Weekly newspaper in Orange, Virginia

- Type: Weekly newspaper
- Owner(s): Lee Enterprises
- Publisher: Eric Mayberry
- Managing editor: Jeff Poole
- Language: English
- Headquarters: 110 Berry Hill Road, Orange, Virginia United States
- Circulation: 1,755 (as of 2021)
- Sister newspapers: The Daily Progress, The News Virginian, The Madison County Eagle, Greene County Record
- Website: orangenews.com

The Orange County Review is a weekly newspaper based in Orange, Virginia owned by Lee Enterprises. The newspaper focuses on local community news. Public notices from the county commissioners also appear in the newspaper.
