= Millbank (Port Conway, Virginia) =

Archaeological site in Virginia, United States

- U.S. National Register of Historic Places
- U.S. Historic district
- Virginia Landmarks Register
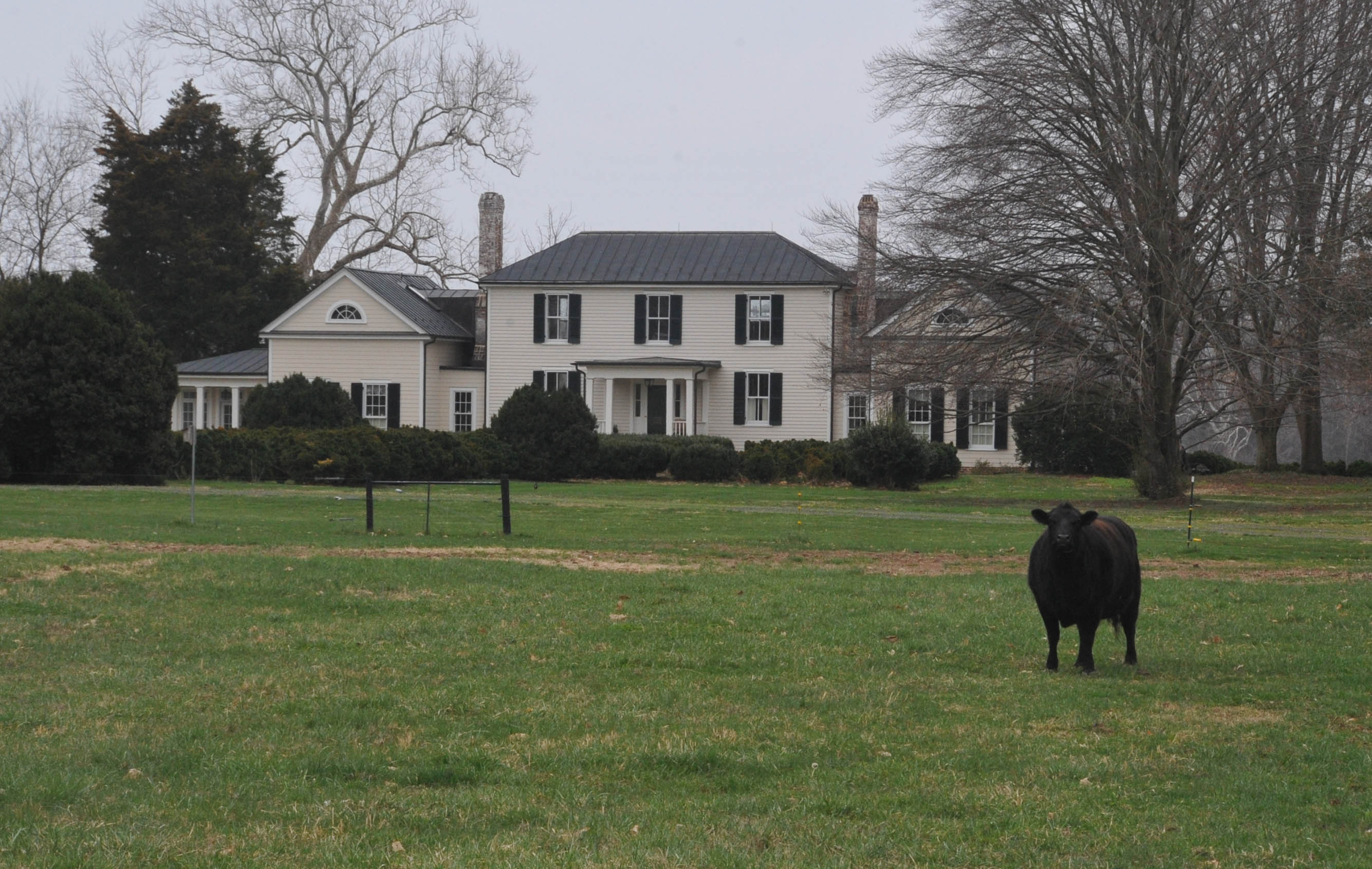

- Location within Virginia Location within the United States
- Location: Millbank Rd., northwest of Port Conway, near Port Conway, Virginia
- Coordinates: 38°11′43″N 77°11′50″W
- Area: 110 acres (45 ha)
- Built: c. 1900
- Architectural style: I-House
- NRHP reference No.: 04000845
- VLR No.: 048-0013

Significant dates
- Added to NRHP: July 10, 2005
- Designated VLR: June 16, 2004

Millbank is a historic home and archaeological site and national historic district located near Port Conway, King George County, Virginia. It encompasses 1 contributing building, 8 contributing sites, and 1 contributing structure. Among the archaeological sites are the A. Fitzhugh Plantation Site including the smokehouse and chimney / kitchen sites; the Ballentine Site; the Brick Rubble Site; the Nail Field Site; the Old House Swamp Pointe Site; and a probable Mill Site. The current house is an I-house dwelling built about 1900 on a basement dating to the 18th century. The plantation was initially settled in 1669; the land has been the site of residential occupation and agricultural endeavors since that time.

It was listed on the National Register of Historic Places in 2005.
