= Sealston, Virginia =

Unincorporated community in Virginia, United States

- Unincorporated community
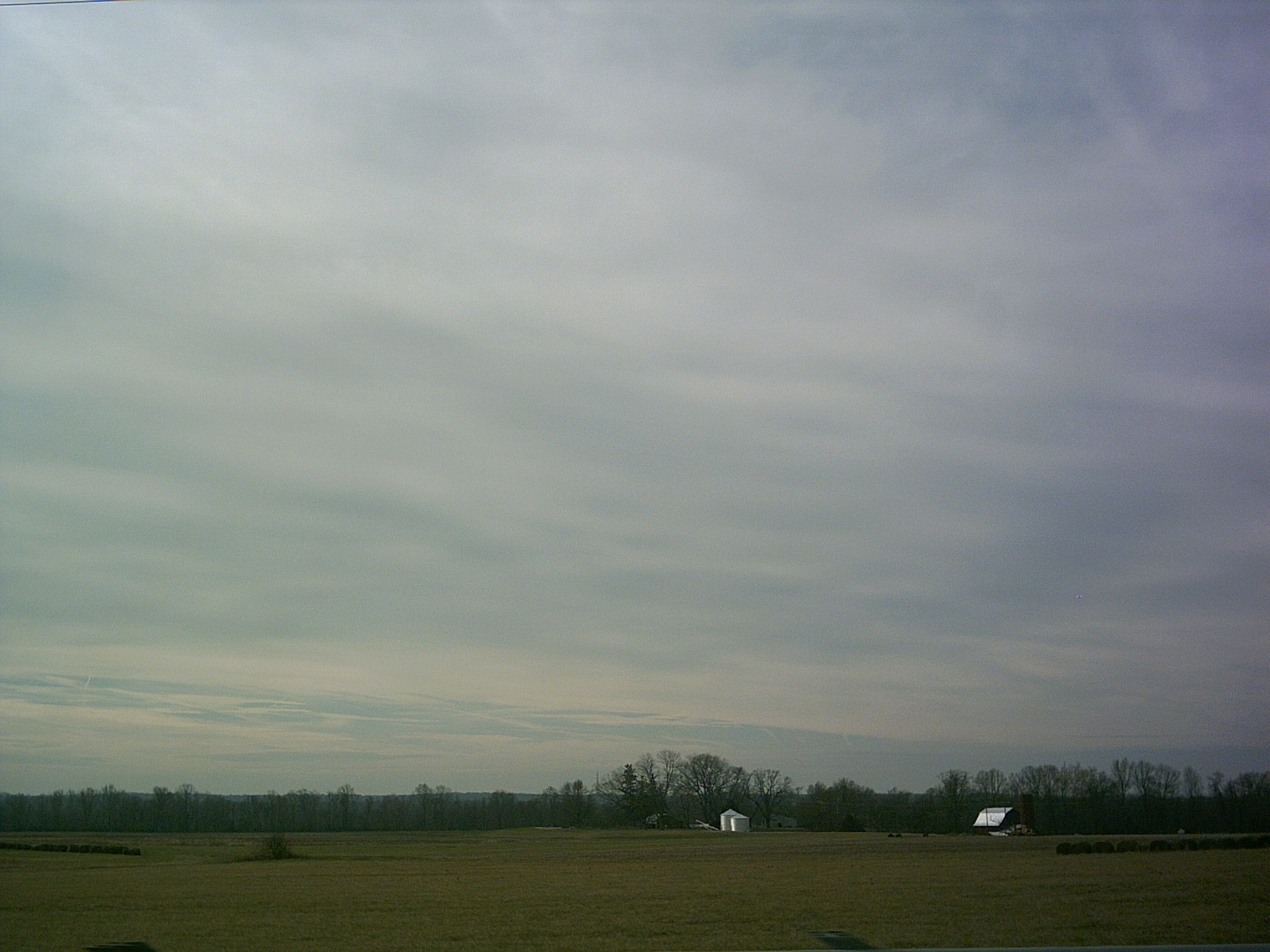
- Farmland in Sealston

- Location within Virginia and the United States Sealston (the United States)
- Coordinates: 38°15′41″N 77°19′55″W
- Country: United States
- State: Virginia
- County: King George
- Time zone: UTC−5 (Eastern (EST))
  - Summer (DST): UTC−4 (EDT)

Sealston is an unincorporated community in King George County, Virginia, United States.

Lamb's Creek Church was listed on the National Register of Historic Places in 1972.
