= Cleydael =

Historic house in Virginia, United States

- U.S. National Register of Historic Places
- Virginia Landmarks Register
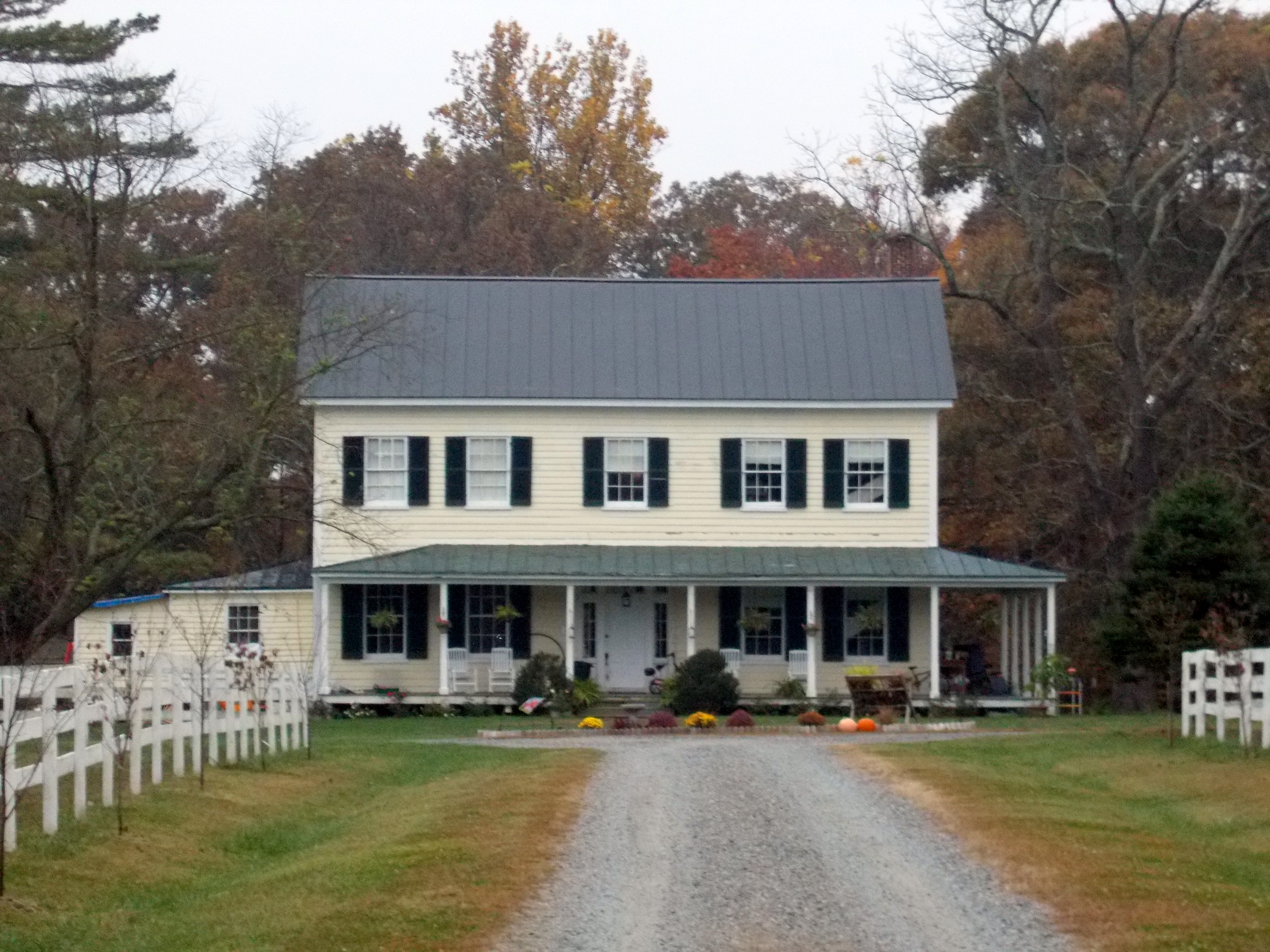
- Cleydael, October 2012

- Location within Virginia Location within the United States
- Location: Off VA 206, near Weedonville, Virginia
- Coordinates: 38°18′47″N 77°8′2″W
- Area: 7.5 acres (3.0 ha)
- Built: 1859
- NRHP reference No.: 86003495
- VLR No.: 048-0041

Significant dates
- Added to NRHP: December 18, 1986
- Designated VLR: July 15, 1986

Cleydael, also known as Quarter Neck, is a historic home located near Weedonville, King George County, Virginia. It was built in 1859, and is a two-story, five-bay, frame dwelling. It has a standing seam, metal gable roof and wraparound porch. The house served as the summer residence for King George County's wealthiest resident, Dr. Richard H. Stuart.

On April 23, 1865 John Wilkes Booth was refused accommodations and medical treatment by Dr. Stuart.

It was listed on the National Register of Historic Places in 1986.
