= Emmanuel Episcopal Church (Port Conway, Virginia) =

Historic church in Virginia, US

- Emmanuel Church
- U.S. National Register of Historic Places
- Virginia Landmarks Register
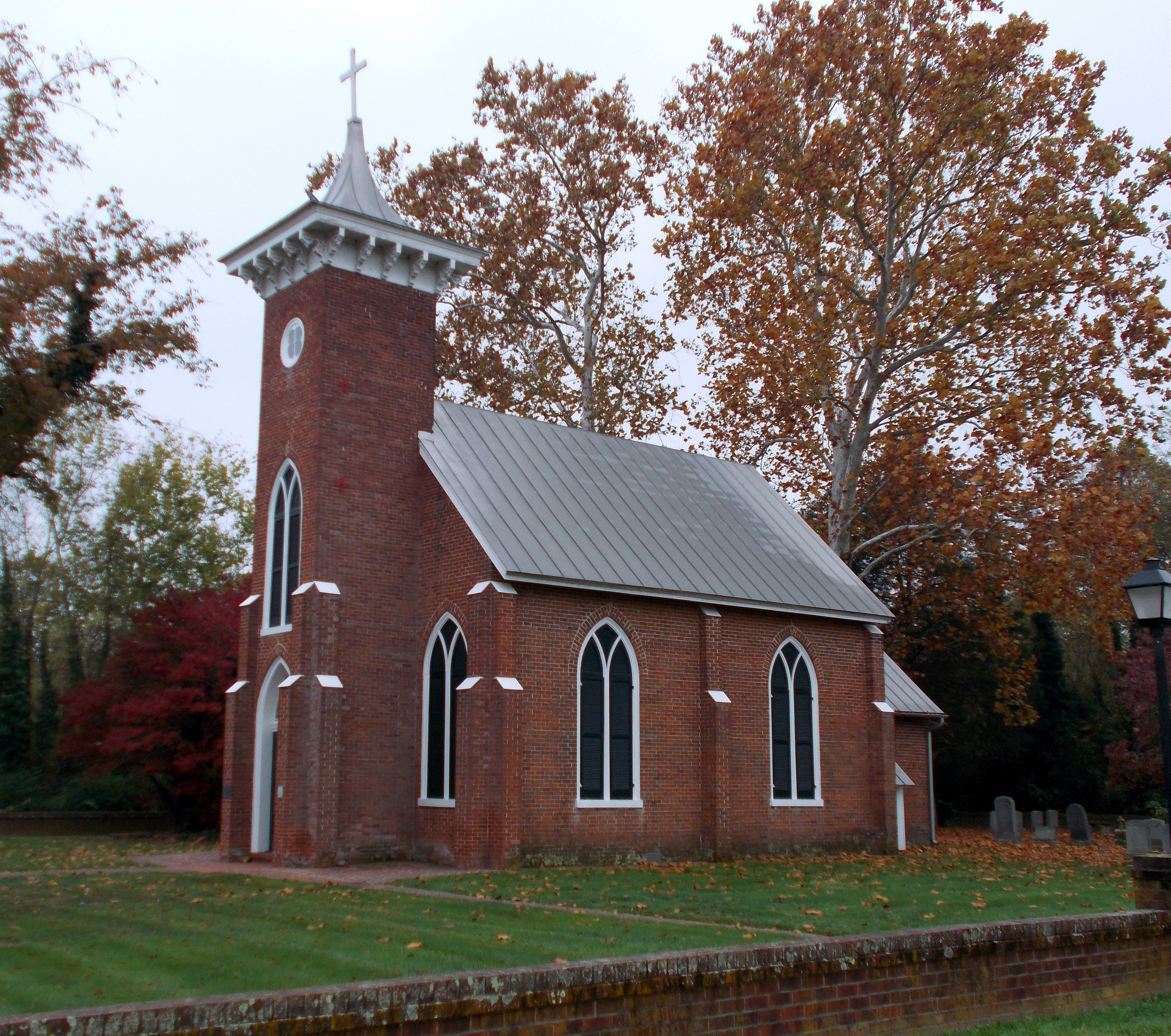
- Emmanuel Episcopal Church, October 2012

- Location within Virginia Location within the United States
- Location: U.S. Route 301; Port Conway, Virginia
- Nearest city: Port Royal, Virginia
- Coordinates: 38°10′46″N 77°11′10″W
- Area: 1 acre (0.40 ha)
- Built: 1860
- Architect: Niernsee & Neilson
- Architectural style: Gothic Revival
- NRHP reference No.: 86003593
- VLR No.: 048-0007

Significant dates
- Added to NRHP: January 7, 1987
- Designated VLR: October 14, 1986

Emmanuel Episcopal Church is an historic Episcopal church located on the west side of U.S. Route 301, just north of the Rappahannock River in Port Conway, Virginia, in the United States. Emmanuel Church and its historic graveyard are located in front of Belle Grove. In 1751, future President James Madison was born at Belle Grove, the childhood home of his mother, Eleanor Rose "Nelly" Conway. On January 7, 1987, Emmanuel Church was added to the National Register of Historic Places. The pipe organ, built by Henry Erben, is original to the building and is in continual use during services.

== National Register listing ==
- Emmanuel Church ** (added 1987 - Building - #86003593)
- Also known as Emmanuel Episcopal Church
- US 301, Port Conway
- Historic Significance: Architecture/Engineering
- Architect, builder, or engineer: Niernsee & Neilson
- Architectural Style: Gothic Revival
- Area of Significance: Architecture
- Period of Significance: 1850-1874
- Owner: Private
- Historic Function: Religion
- Historic Sub-function: Religious Structure
- Current Function: Religion
- Current Sub-function: Religious Structure

== Current usage ==
Emmanuel Church is still in use and is one of three churches that form the Hanover-with-Brunswick Parish of the Episcopal Diocese of Virginia. The rector of the parish is the Rev. Richard E. Fichter, Jr. Services are held twice a month at Emmanuel.

== See also ==
- Emmanuel Episcopal Church (disambiguation)
- National Register of Historic Places listings in King George County, Virginia

== Gallery ==
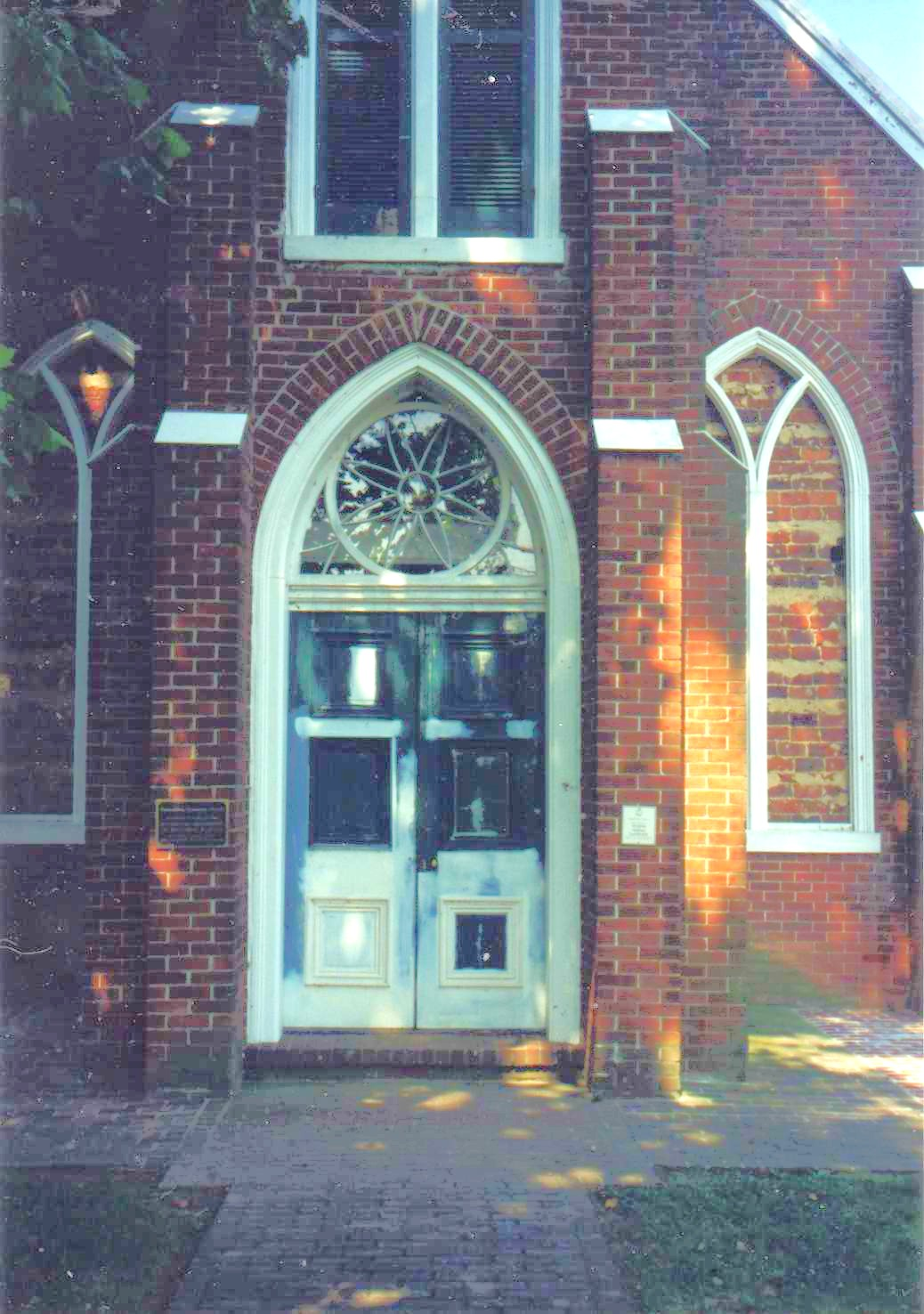
Entrance to Emmanuel Episcopal Church, 1995

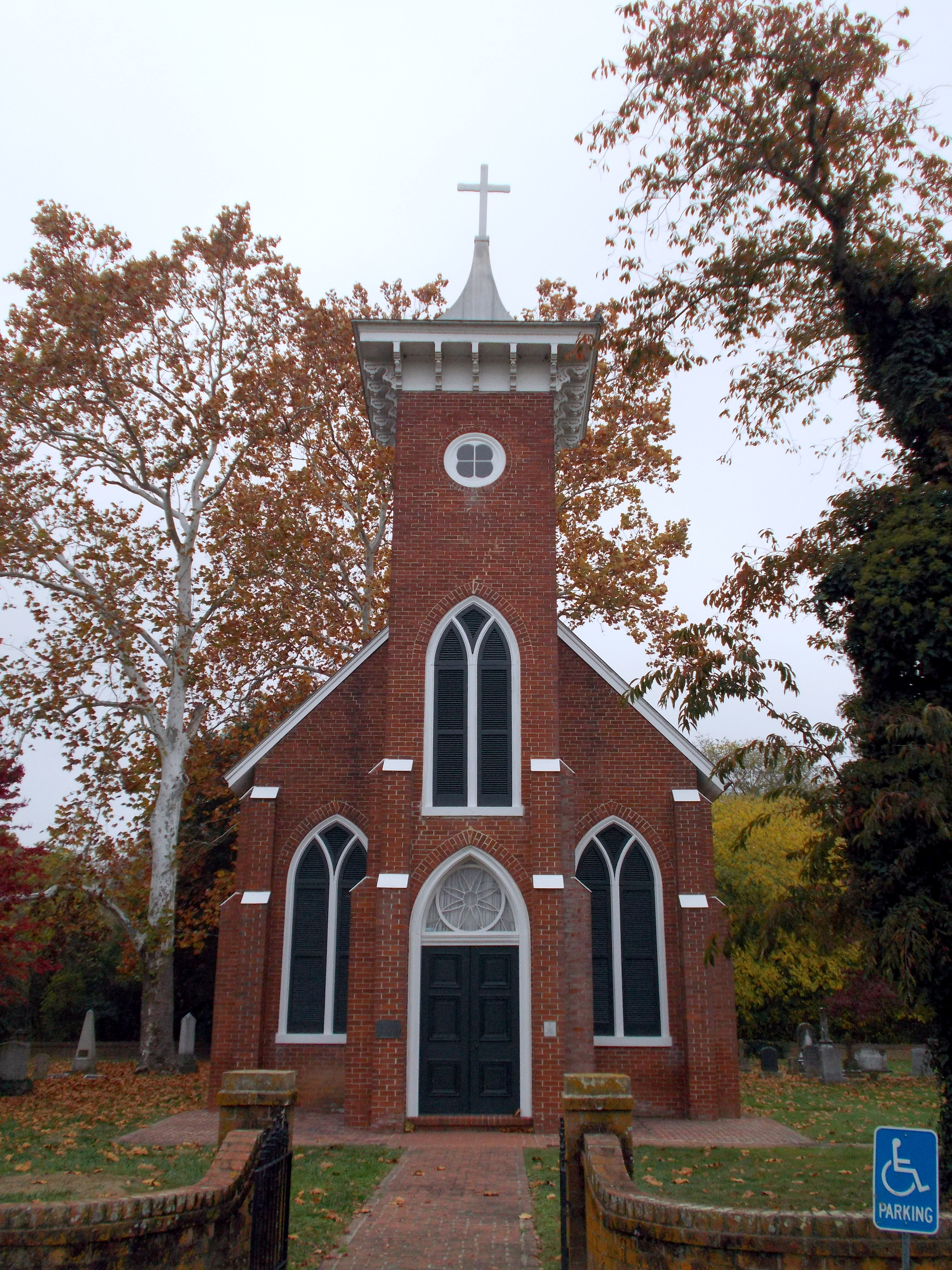
Emmanuel Episcopal Church Front Shot, Port Conway, Virginia, October 2012
