= Belle Grove (Port Conway, Virginia) =

Historic house in Virginia, US

- U.S. National Register of Historic Places
- Virginia Landmarks Register
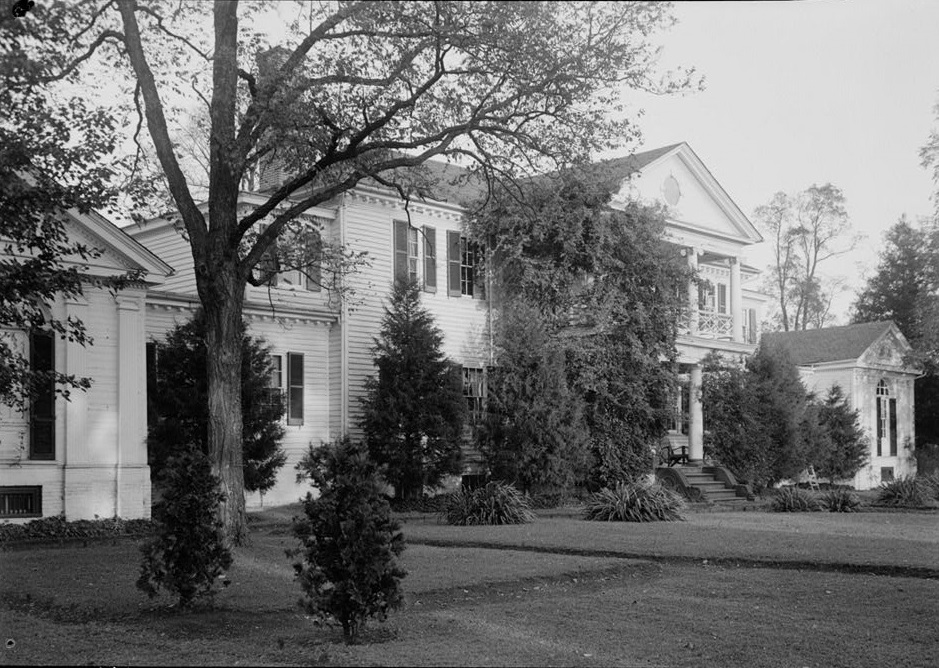
- Historic American Buildings Survey, 1941

- Location within Northern Virginia Location within Virginia Location within the United States
- Location: Port Conway, Virginia
- Coordinates: 38.1793°N 77.1885°W
- Area: 380 acres (150 ha)
- Built: 1790
- NRHP reference No.: 73002029
- VLR No.: 048-0027

Significant dates
- Added to NRHP: April 11, 1973
- Designated VLR: September 19, 1972

Belle Grove is a historic plantation located on U.S. Route 301 in Port Conway, Virginia. The present plantation house was built in 1790.

James Madison, a Founding Father and the fourth President of the United States, was born on March 16, 1751, at Belle Grove plantation in an earlier house which no longer stands. Belle Grove plantation was also the childhood home of his mother, Eleanor Rose "Nelly" Conway. Her father Francis Conway was the namesake for Port Conway.

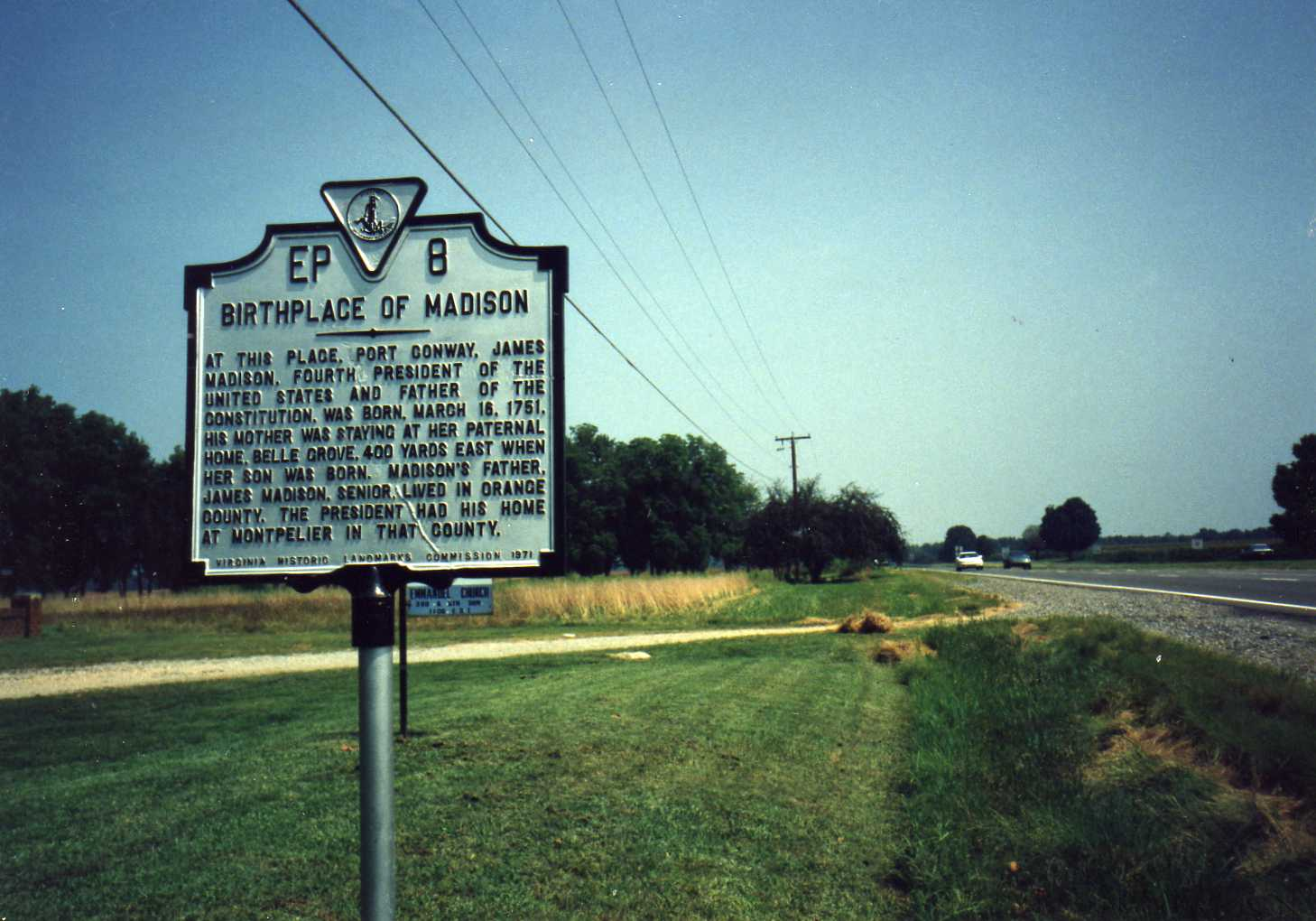
Birthplace of Madison historical marker (erected 1971) on US 301 in front of Emmanuel Episcopal Church. His birthplace was 400 yards (370 m) away in a house that no longer stands.

On April 11, 1973, Belle Grove was added to the National Register of Historic Places.

== See also ==
- List of residences of presidents of the United States
