= Nanzatico (King George, Virginia) =

Historic house in Virginia, United States

- U.S. National Register of Historic Places
- Virginia Landmarks Register
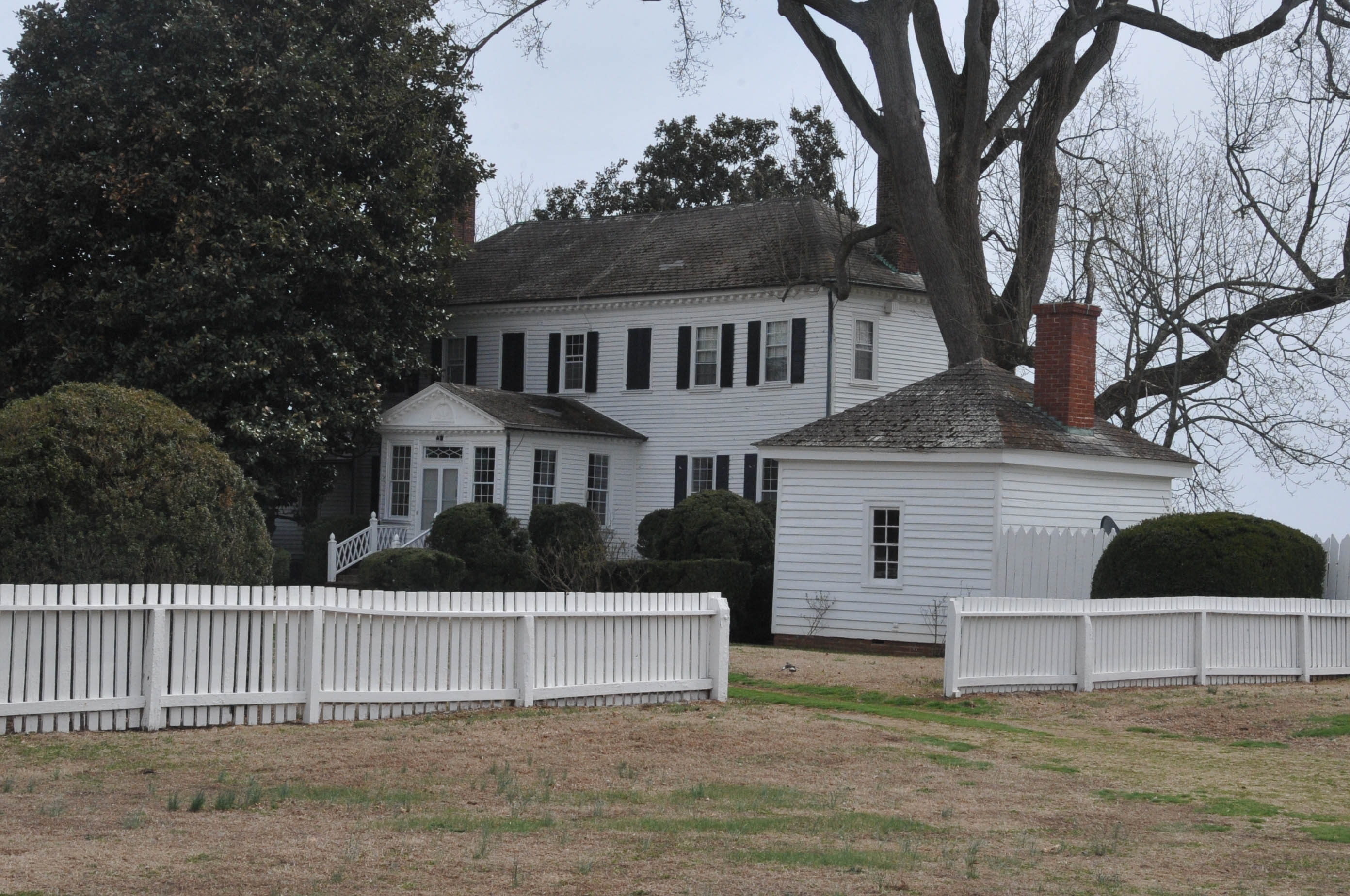

- Location within Virginia Location within the United States
- Location: S of jct. of SR 650 and 625, King George Court House, Virginia
- Coordinates: 38°10′11″N 77°07′34″W
- Area: 340 acres (140 ha)
- Built: c. 1770
- Architectural style: Colonial
- NRHP reference No.: 69000250
- VLR No.: 048-0015

Significant dates
- Added to NRHP: November 12, 1969
- Designated VLR: May 13, 1969

Nanzatico is a historic plantation house located at King George Court House, King George County, Virginia. It was built about 1770, and is a frame, two-story structure, seven-bays wide, with a hipped roof, and two interior end chimneys. The front facade features an engaged portico consisting of heroic pilasters, entablature, and bulls-eye pediment. Also on the property are the contributing square frame smokehouse, a frame summer kitchen, and a frame schoolhouse or office. Next to Mount Vernon, Nanzatico is probably the most formal frame colonial mansion in Virginia.

It was listed on the National Register of Historic Places in 1969.
