= Westmoreland County, Virginia =

County in Virginia, United States

- County
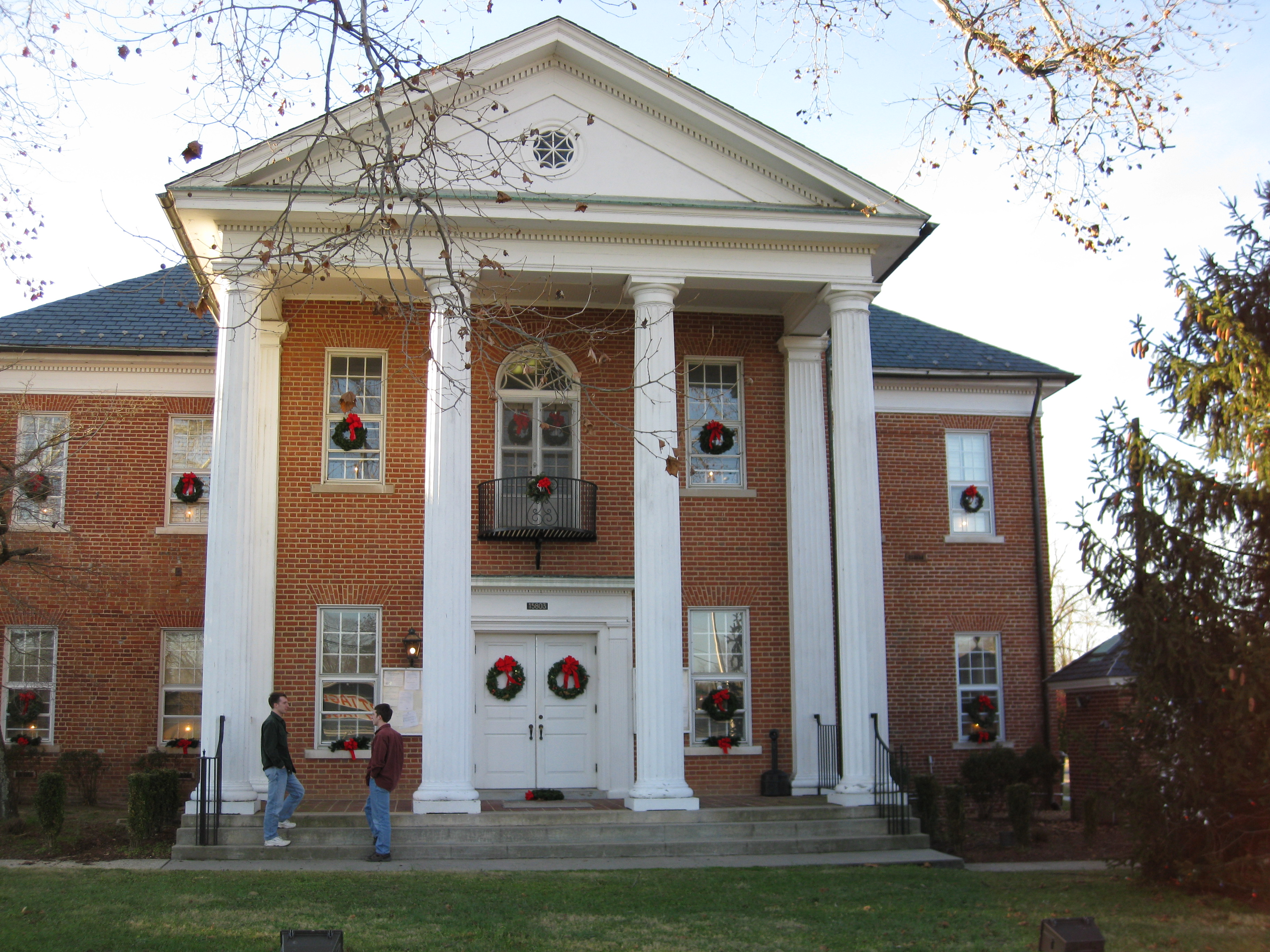
- Old Westmoreland County Courthouse in Montross

- Seal

- Location within the U.S. state of Virginia
- Coordinates: 38°07′N 76°48′W
- Country: United States
- State: Virginia
- Founded: 1653
- Named for: Westmorland
- Seat: Montross
- Largest town: Colonial Beach

Area
  - Total: 253 sq mi (660 km^{2})
  - Land: 229 sq mi (590 km^{2})
  - Water: 24 sq mi (62 km^{2}) 9.3%

Population (2020)
  - Total: 18,477
  - Estimate (2025): 19,715 ▲
  - Density: 80.7/sq mi (31.2/km^{2})
- Time zone: UTC−5 (Eastern)
  - Summer (DST): UTC−4 (EDT)
- Congressional district: 1st
- Website: www.westmoreland-county.org

Westmoreland County is located in the Northern Neck of the Commonwealth of Virginia. As of the 2020 United States census, the population sits at 18,477. Its county seat is Montross.

== History ==
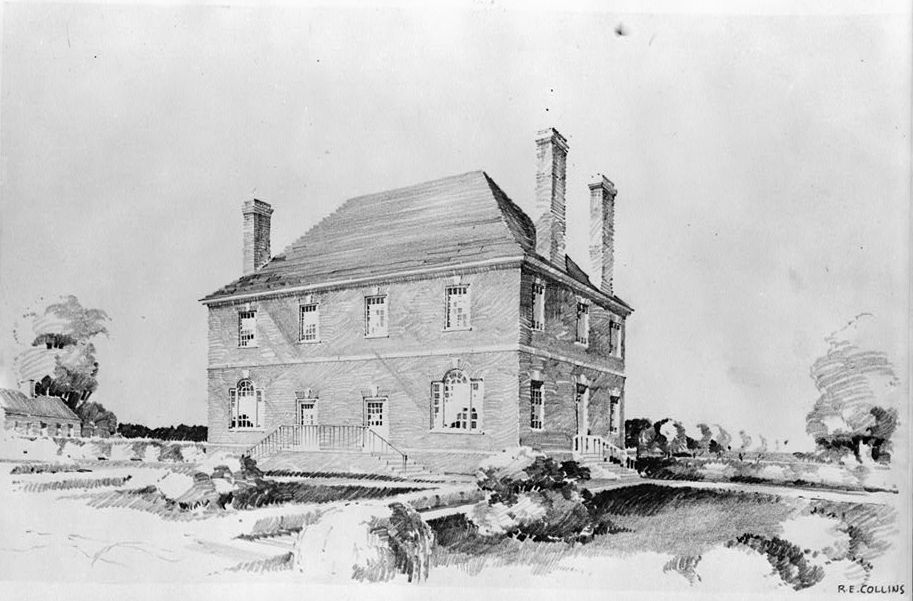
Nomini Hall, the Carter family plantation in Westmoreland County, was built in 1730 on land purchased from heirs of Nicholas Spencer by Robert "King" Carter

As originally established by the Virginia colony's House of Burgesses, this area was separated from Northumberland County in 1653 and named for the English county of Westmorland; both counties are coastal. The territory of Westmoreland County encompassed much of what later became the various counties and cities of Northern Virginia, including the city of Alexandria, Arlington County, Fairfax County, and Prince William County. These areas comprised part of Westmoreland until the formation of Stafford County in 1664.

Westmoreland County on Northern Neck was the birthplace of George Washington, who later became the first President of the United States (born at the former settlement of Bridges Creek, Virginia); of James Monroe, the fifth President; and of Robert E. Lee, general and commander of the Confederate armies during the American Civil War of 1861–1865.

Colonel Nicholas Spencer (1633-1689) resided in this county. He patented the land at Mount Vernon in 1674 with his friend Lt. Col. John Washington, ancestor of George Washington. Spencer, who served as President of the Council and acting Governor (in office: 1683–1684) of the Colony of Virginia, was the cousin of, and agent for, the Barons Colepeper, proprietors of the Northern Neck. Spencer lived at his plantation, Nomini, which his descendants later sold to Robert Carter I (1662/63 – 1732) .

Robert Carter's grandson, Robert Carter III, is known for voluntarily freeing almost 500 slaves from Nomini Hall, beginning in 1791. He also provided for their settlement on land that he bought for them in Ohio Country. This manumission was the largest known release of slaves in North America prior to the American Civil War and involved the largest number ever manumitted by an individual in the U.S.

== Geography ==
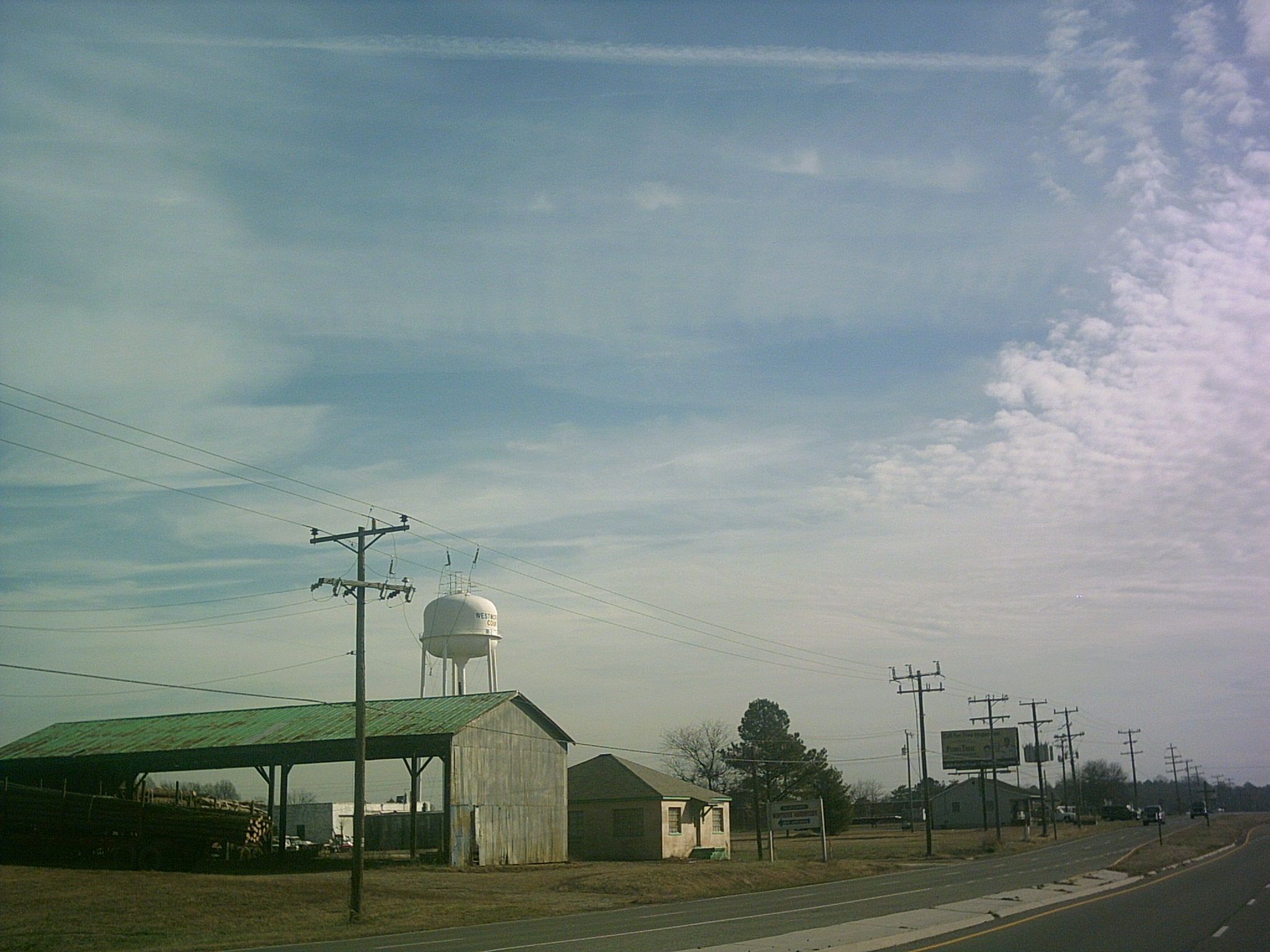
Rural Westmoreland County

According to the U.S. Census Bureau, the county has a total area of 253 square miles (660 km^{2}), of which 229 square miles (590 km^{2}) is land and 24 square miles (62 km^{2}) (9.3%) is water. Located on the Northern Neck, the county is within the Northern Neck George Washington Birthplace AVA winemaking appellation.

=== Adjacent counties ===
- Charles County, Maryland - north
- St. Mary's County, Maryland - northeast
- Northumberland County - southeast
- Richmond County - south
- Essex County - southwest
- King George County - northwest

=== National protected areas ===
- George Washington Birthplace National Monument
- Rappahannock River Valley National Wildlife Refuge (part) Mothershead unit

=== Major highways ===
- SR 3
- SR 202
- SR 203
- SR 205

== Demographics ==
Historical population
Census	Pop.	Note	%±
1820	6,901		—
1830	8,396		21.7%
1840	8,019		−4.5%
1850	8,080		0.8%
1860	8,282		2.5%
1870	7,682		−7.2%
1880	8,846		15.2%
1890	8,399		−5.1%
1900	9,243		10.0%
1910	9,313		0.8%
1920	10,240		10.0%
1930	8,497		−17.0%
1940	9,512		11.9%
1950	10,148		6.7%
1960	11,042		8.8%
1970	12,142		10.0%
1980	14,041		15.6%
1990	15,480		10.2%
2000	16,718		8.0%
2010	17,454		4.4%
2020	18,477		5.9%
2025 (est.)	19,715	▲	6.7%
U.S. Decennial Census; 1790-1960 1900-1990; 1990-2000 2010 2020

=== Racial and ethnic composition ===
Westmoreland County, Virginia – Racial and ethnic composition Note: the US Census treats Hispanic/Latino as an ethnic category. This table excludes Latinos from the racial categories and assigns them to a separate category. Hispanics/Latinos may be of any race.
Race / Ethnicity (NH = Non-Hispanic)	Pop 1980	Pop 1990	Pop 2000	Pop 2010	Pop 2020	% 1980	% 1990	% 2000	% 2010	% 2020
White alone (NH)	8,624	10,187	10,720	11,087	11,758	61.42%	65.81%	64.12%	63.52%	63.64%
Black or African American alone (NH)	5,242	5,093	5,139	4,855	4,470	37.33%	32.90%	30.74%	27.82%	24.19%
Native American or Alaska Native alone (NH)	14	30	39	64	67	0.10%	0.19%	0.23%	0.37%	0.36%
Asian alone (NH)	36	66	61	91	146	0.26%	0.43%	0.36%	0.52%	0.79%
Native Hawaiian or Pacific Islander alone (NH)	x	x	2	3	11	x	x	0.01%	0.02%	0.06%
Other race alone (NH)	7	4	17	14	68	0.05%	0.03%	0.10%	0.08%	0.37%
Mixed race or Multiracial (NH)	x	x	161	338	908	x	x	0.96%	1.94%	4.91%
Hispanic or Latino (any race)	118	100	579	1,002	1,049	0.84%	0.65%	3.46%	5.74%	5.68%
Total	14,041	15,480	16,718	17,454	18,477	100.00%	100.00%	100.00%	100.00%	100.00%

=== 2020 census ===
As of the 2020 census, the county had a population of 18,477. The median age was 49.9 years. 18.5% of residents were under the age of 18 and 26.2% of residents were 65 years of age or older. For every 100 females there were 94.0 males, and for every 100 females age 18 and over there were 91.9 males age 18 and over.

The racial makeup of the county was 64.6% White, 24.3% Black or African American, 0.4% American Indian and Alaska Native, 0.8% Asian, 0.1% Native Hawaiian and Pacific Islander, 3.2% from some other race, and 6.6% from two or more races. Hispanic or Latino residents of any race comprised 5.7% of the population.

21.5% of residents lived in urban areas, while 78.5% lived in rural areas.

There were 8,037 households in the county, of which 22.4% had children under the age of 18 living with them and 29.9% had a female householder with no spouse or partner present. About 31.7% of all households were made up of individuals and 16.8% had someone living alone who was 65 years of age or older.

There were 11,129 housing units, of which 27.8% were vacant. Among occupied housing units, 75.0% were owner-occupied and 25.0% were renter-occupied. The homeowner vacancy rate was 2.6% and the rental vacancy rate was 7.3%.

=== 2000 census ===
At the 2000 census, there were 16,718 people, 6,846 households and 4,689 families residing in the county. The population density was 73/sq mi (28/km^{2}). There were 9,286 housing units at an average density of 40/sq mi (15/km^{2}). The racial makeup of the county was 65.41% White, 30.89% Black or African American, 0.28% Native American, 0.36% Asian, 0.01% Pacific Islander, 1.75% from other races, and 1.29% from two or more races. 3.46% of the population were Hispanic or Latino of any race.

There were 6,846 households, of which 25.70% had children under the age of 18 living with them, 50.70% were married couples living together, 13.50% had a female householder with no husband present, and 31.50% were non-families. 26.90% of all households were made up of individuals, and 13.60% had someone living alone who was 65 years of age or older. The average household size was 2.43 and the average family size was 2.91.

23.00% of the population were under the age of 18, 6.30% from 18 to 24, 23.90% from 25 to 44, 27.80% from 45 to 64, and 19.00% who were 65 years of age or older. The median age was 43 years. For every 100 females, there were 92.30 males. For every 100 females age 18 and over, there were 88.90 males age 18 and over.

The median household income was $35,797 and the median family income was $41,357. Males had a median income of $31,333 and females $22,221. The per capita income was $19,473. About 11.20% of families and 14.70% of the population were below the poverty line, including 21.10% of those under age 18 and 12.50% of those age 65 or over.

== Economy ==
The county's economy is largely based on agriculture. Tourism is another significant economic driver, related to historical sites such as George Washington Birthplace National Monument and Robert E. Lee's birthplace, Stratford Hall Plantation, and the Westmoreland County Museum as well as gambling activities available in Colonial Beach. The county is also an extended exurb of Washington, D.C.

Northern Neck Coca-Cola Bottling Inc. (makers of Northern Neck Ginger Ale) and the weekly Westmoreland News are located in Montross.

== Notable people ==
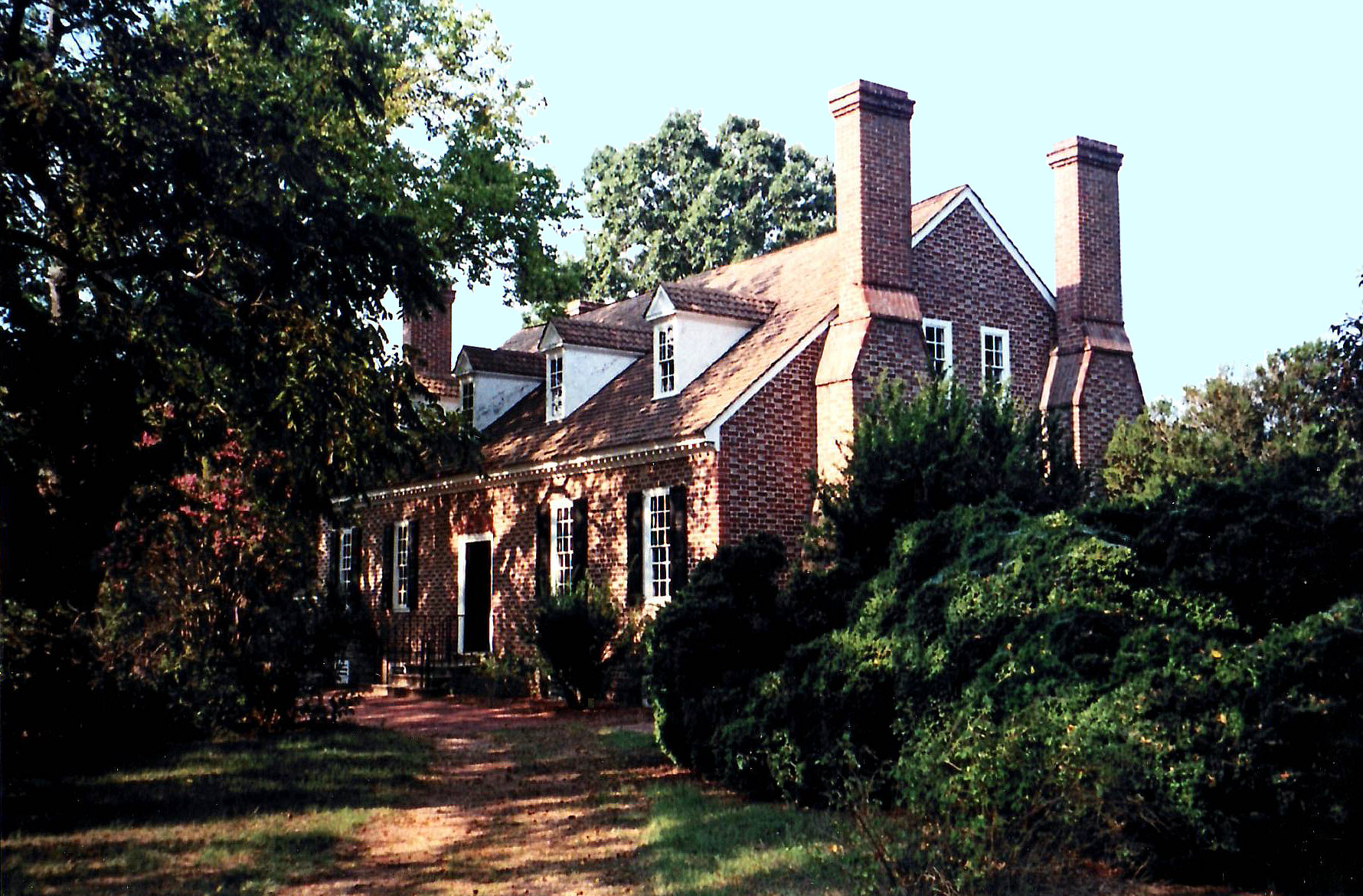
George Washington Birthplace National Monument

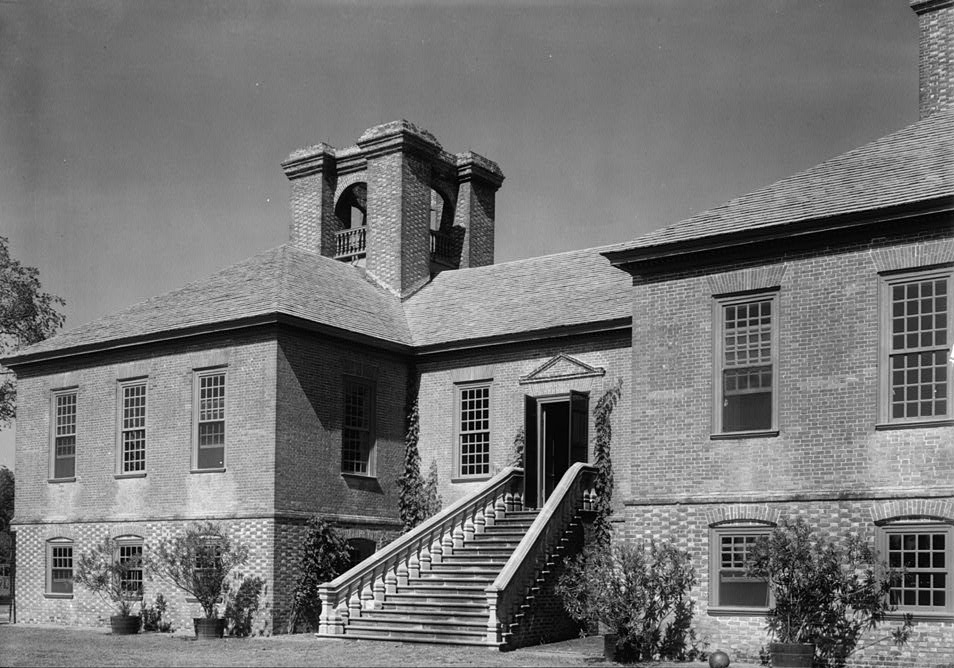
View of the main facade of Stratford Hall, the ancestral home of the Lee family of Westmoreland County

- Eliza Allen, African American activist, clubwoman, and banker
- Walter Balderson (1926–2023), Emmy Award-winning video engineer
- Thomas Brown, second governor of Florida
- Francis Lightfoot Lee, U.S. Founding Father and signer of the U.S. Declaration of Independence
- Laetitia Corbin Lee (1657–1706), American colonist
- Richard Henry Lee, a signatory of the United States Declaration of Independence, U.S. Senator, and sixth president of the United States in Congress Assembled under the Articles of Confederation
- Richard "Squire" Lee, prominent Virginian colonist and American politician
- Robert E. Lee (1807-1870), Confederate Army general in the American Civil War
- Thomas Lee, leading political figure in colonial Virginia
- Mike ter Maat, economist and 2024 Libertarian Party vice presidential nominee
- Joseph Alexander Mabry (1796–1837), Tennessee state politician
- Thomas Marshall, father of former U.S. Supreme Court chief justice John Marshall
- James Monroe (1758-1831), fifth president of the United States
- John dos Passos, author of the U.S.A. trilogy and other works
- Nicholas Spencer, acting governor of Virginia, co-patentee of Mount Vernon estate
- Nathaniel Rochester, founder of Rochester, New York
- Thomas Sandford, American Revolutionary War soldier, Kentucky legislator, Member of the Eighth and Ninth U.S. Congress
- Bushrod Washington (1762-1829), Associate Justice of the Supreme Court, founder and first president of the American Colonization Society, nephew of George Washington and inheritor of Mount Vernon
- George Washington (1732-1799), the first president of the United States
- John Washington (1631-1677), great-grandfather of George Washington
- Sloan Wilson, author of The Man in the Gray Flannel Suit
- Rob Wittman, U.S. Congressman

== Communities ==
=== Towns ===
- Colonial Beach
- Montross

== Politics ==
Westmoreland County is a notable bellwether for U.S. presidential politics, having voted for the winner in every election since 1928 except 1948, 1960, and 2020.

United States presidential election results for Westmoreland County, Virginia
Year	Republican		Democratic		Third party(ies)	
Year	No.	%	No.	%	No.	%
1912	69	15.16%	341	74.95%	45	9.89%
1916	126	27.10%	338	72.69%	1	0.22%
1920	133	25.09%	396	74.72%	1	0.19%
1924	157	23.97%	484	73.89%	14	2.14%
1928	554	58.50%	393	41.50%	0	0.00%
1932	212	24.74%	641	74.80%	4	0.47%
1936	296	25.36%	871	74.64%	0	0.00%
1940	357	29.68%	845	70.24%	1	0.08%
1944	532	39.58%	808	60.12%	4	0.30%
1948	568	44.51%	503	39.42%	205	16.07%
1952	1,117	59.51%	754	40.17%	6	0.32%
1956	1,033	54.45%	695	36.64%	169	8.91%
1960	1,176	53.00%	1,034	46.60%	9	0.41%
1964	1,181	47.26%	1,312	52.50%	6	0.24%
1968	1,402	39.99%	1,156	32.97%	948	27.04%
1972	2,331	66.00%	1,113	31.51%	88	2.49%
1976	1,909	41.79%	2,355	51.55%	304	6.65%
1980	2,510	50.31%	2,271	45.52%	208	4.17%
1984	3,219	56.84%	2,363	41.73%	81	1.43%
1988	2,974	55.38%	2,311	43.04%	85	1.58%
1992	2,554	41.04%	2,758	44.32%	911	14.64%
1996	2,333	40.31%	2,949	50.95%	506	8.74%
2000	2,932	48.66%	2,922	48.49%	172	2.85%
2004	3,433	50.13%	3,370	49.21%	45	0.66%
2008	3,719	44.40%	4,577	54.64%	81	0.97%
2012	3,731	45.95%	4,295	52.89%	94	1.16%
2016	4,448	51.88%	3,836	44.74%	290	3.38%
2020	5,318	53.54%	4,501	45.31%	114	1.15%
2024	6,003	56.59%	4,491	42.34%	113	1.07%

== Education ==
There are two school districts: Westmoreland County Public Schools has the majority of the county, while Colonial Beach Town Public Schools has residential areas in the town limits of Colonial Beach.

== See also ==
- George Washington Birthplace National Monument
- History of Popes Creek, Virginia
- National Register of Historic Places listings in Westmoreland County, Virginia
- Stratford Hall Plantation
- Central Rappahannock Regional Library
- Westmoreland State Park
