= King George, Virginia =

- Census-designated place
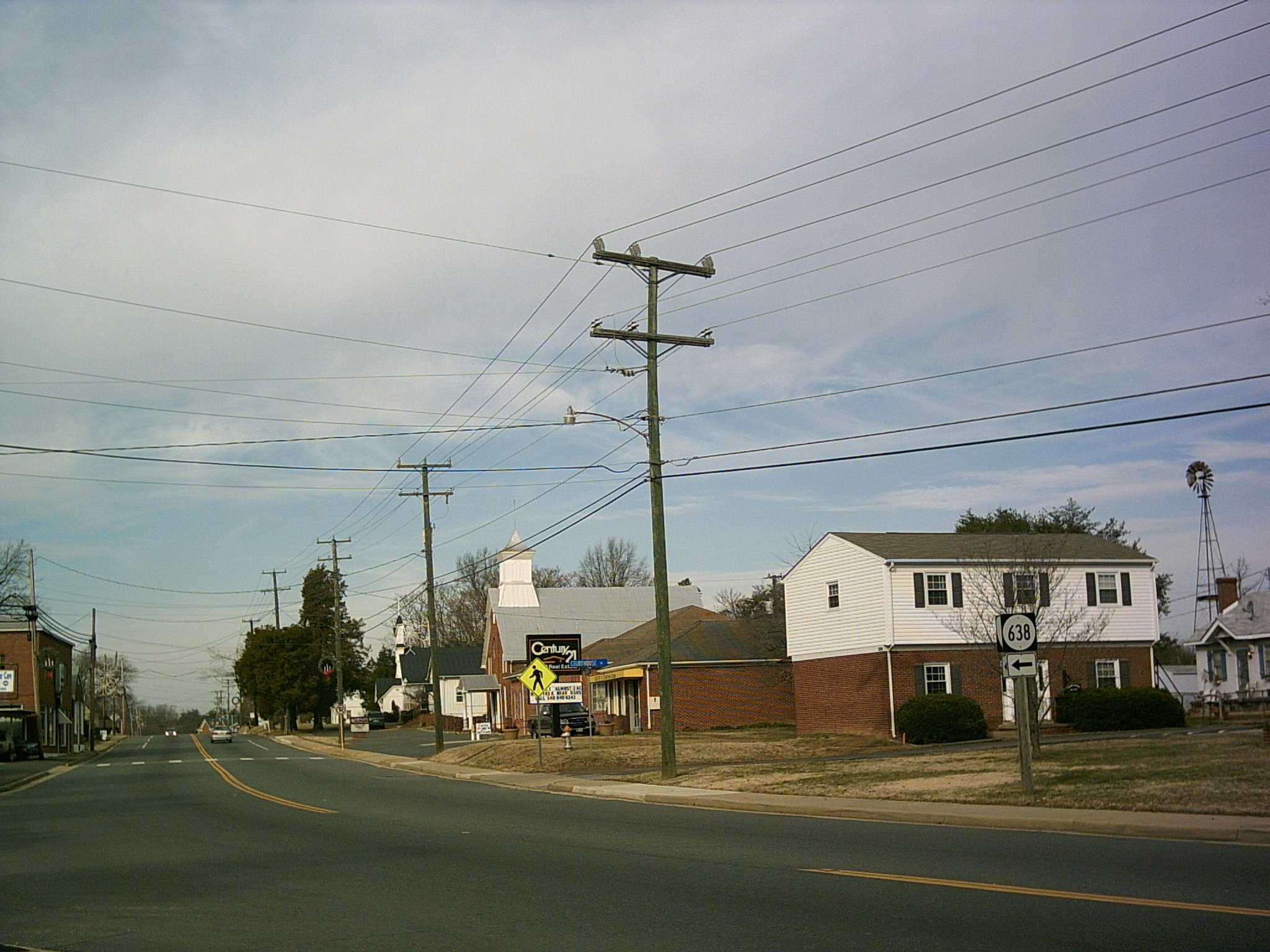
- Main business district of King George

- Location in King George County and the state of Virginia
- Coordinates: 38°16′5″N 77°11′4″W
- Country: United States
- State: Virginia
- County: King George

Area
  - Total: 10.8 sq mi (28.0 km^{2})
  - Land: 10.8 sq mi (27.9 km^{2})
  - Water: 0.039 sq mi (0.1 km^{2})
- Elevation: 210 ft (64 m)

Population (2020)
  - Total: 4,970
  - Density: 460/sq mi (177.5/km^{2})
- Time zone: UTC−5 (Eastern (EST))
  - Summer (DST): UTC−4 (EDT)
- ZIP code: 22485
- Area code: 540
- FIPS code: 51-42568
- GNIS feature ID: 2629028

King George is a census-designated place (CDP) in and the county seat of King George County, Virginia, United States. It is sometimes referred to as King George Courthouse, because it is the location of the King George County Courthouse. The population as of the 2020 census was 4,970. The Journal Press was a local weekly newspaper published in King George and serving local areas until its final issue was published on Jan 11th, 2017.

== Geography ==
The community is in central King George County along Virginia State Route 3, which leads west 18 miles (29 km) to Fredericksburg and southeast 38 miles (61 km) to Warsaw.

According to the U.S. Census Bureau, the King George CDP has a total area of 10.8 square miles (28.0 km^{2}), of which 0.04 square miles (0.1 km^{2}), or 0.43%, are water.

== Demographics ==
Historical population
Census	Pop.	Note	%±
2020	4,970		—
U.S. Decennial Census; 2010 2020

=== 2020 census ===
As of the 2020 census, King George had a population of 4,970. The median age was 36.9 years. 27.8% of residents were under the age of 18 and 12.8% of residents were 65 years of age or older. For every 100 females there were 97.3 males, and for every 100 females age 18 and over there were 92.3 males age 18 and over.

0.0% of residents lived in urban areas, while 100.0% lived in rural areas.

There were 1,685 households in King George, of which 38.8% had children under the age of 18 living in them. Of all households, 55.5% were married-couple households, 13.6% were households with a male householder and no spouse or partner present, and 23.4% were households with a female householder and no spouse or partner present. About 22.0% of all households were made up of individuals and 8.1% had someone living alone who was 65 years of age or older.

There were 1,786 housing units, of which 5.7% were vacant. The homeowner vacancy rate was 1.3% and the rental vacancy rate was 3.2%.

Racial composition as of the 2020 census
Race	Number	Percent
White	3,467	69.8%
Black or African American	818	16.5%
American Indian and Alaska Native	25	0.5%
Asian	70	1.4%
Native Hawaiian and Other Pacific Islander	6	0.1%
Some other race	113	2.3%
Two or more races	471	9.5%
Hispanic or Latino (of any race)	303	6.1%

=== 2010 census ===
King George was first listed as a census designated place in the 2010 U.S. census.

== Attractions ==
The King George Fall Festival, begun in 1959, is held annually the second weekend of October, to benefit the fire and rescue squad. It includes a parade through town, a carnival, a craft fair, a car show, a dance, a 5-K run, and the Fall Festival Queen Pageant. The town has a YMCA recreational facility. Also, every Saturday morning, the King George middle school hosts a farmer's market. The King George high school is the largest building in the town.

The Ralph Bunche High School, Powhatan Rural Historic District, Rokeby, Nanzatico, Office Hall and Millbank are listed on the National Register of Historic Places.
