= Madison (surname) =

Madison is a surname, and may refer to:

== A ==
- Ambrose Madison (1696–1732), American planter and politician in colonial Virginia
- Anthony Madison (born 1981), American football player
- Art Madison (1871–1933), American baseball player
- Ashley Madison (drag queen) (born 1997), Australian drag performer
- Austin Madison (born 1984), American animator and voice actor

== B ==
- Bailee Madison (born 1999), American-Canadian actress and singer
- Bennett Madison (born 1981), American author
- Bingie Madison (1901–1978), American jazz clarinetist and tenor saxophonist
- Bob Madison (baseball) (1911–1973), American baseball league pitcher

== C ==
- Carl Madison (1931–2024), American football coach
- C. C. Madison (Charles Clarence Madison) (1878–1957), American lawyer and baseball team owner
- Cleo Madison (1883–1964), American actress, screenwriter, producer and director
- Cole Madison (born 1994), American football player
- Colin Madison (born 1989), American football player

== D ==
- Darius Madison (born 1994), American soccer player
- Darrin Madison (born 1997), American politician from Wisconsin and justice activist
- Dave Madison (1921–1985), American baseball pitcher
- Deborah Madison, American chef and food writer
- Dolley Madison (1768–1849), wife of James Madison

== E ==
- Edmond H. Madison (1865–1911), American politician from Kansas
- Eleanor Madison (1731–1829), American planter in Virginia and mother of James Madison
- Elina Madison, American actress, writer and producer

== G ==
- Garrett Madison (born 1978), American mountaineer, guide and expedition leader
- George Madison (1763–1816), Governor of Kentucky
- George T. Madison (c.1830–1868), American army officer
- Guy Madison (1922–1996), American actor

== H ==
- Harry Madison (1909–1995), Canadian wrestler
- Helene Madison (1913–1970), American swimmer
- Henry Green Madison (1843–1912), American civic leader from Texas
- Holly Madison (born 1979), American model

== I ==
- Ira Madison III (born 1986), American television writer and podcaster

== J ==
- Jaak Madison (born 1991), Estonian politician
- James Madison (1751–1836), fourth President of the United States
- James Madison Sr. (1723–1801), father of James Madison
- James Madison (bishop) (1749–1812), first Bishop of the Episcopal Diocese of Virginia, cousin of James Madison
- James Madison (Medal of Honor) (1842–1926), American Union Army sergeant and Medal of Honor recipient
- James Madison (musician) (1935–2008), American blues guitar player
- James Madison (writer) (1872–1943), American writer and publisher of Madison's Budget
- James G. Madison, known as the Mad Hatter (born 1956/57), convicted bank robber in New Jersey
- James Jonas Madison (1884–1922), U.S. Navy commander
- James H. Madison, American writer and academic
- James S. Madison (1846–1892), American planter and politician from Mississippi
- Jimmy Madison (musician) (1947–2026), American jazz drummer
- Joe Madison (1949–2024), American political activist and radio host

== K ==
- Kate Madison (born 1978) is a British actor and independent filmmaker
- Keith Madison (born 1951), American baseball player and coach
- Kellie Madison, American screenwriter and film producer, director and actress
- Kid Shots Madison (1899–1948), American jazz cornetist
- Kirsten Madison (born 1968), American government official

== L ==
- Linda Coleman-Madison, American politician from Alabama
- Louise Madison (1911–1970), American tap dancer
- Lucy Foster Madison (1865–1932), American novelist

== M ==
- Mae Madison (1915–2004), American film actress
- Martha Madison (born 1977), American actress
- Martin Madison (born 1854), American politician in South Dakota
- Mary Madison (born 1950), American politician
- Maud Madison (1870–1953), American actress and dancer
- Michael Madison (born 1977), American serial killer
- Mikey Madison (born 1999), American actress
- Mystique Summers Madison (born 1984/5), American drag performer

== N ==
- Nellie Madison (1895–1953), American woman convicted of murdering her husband who had a death sentence commuted
- Noel Madison (1897–1975), American character actor

== P ==
- Paula Williams Madison (born 1953), American journalist and media executive
- Piper Madison (born 2002), American singer

== R ==
- Rebecca Madyson (born 1979), Maltese sport shooter
- Robert P. Madison (born 1923), American architect

== S ==
- Sam Madison (born 1974), American football player
- Sarah Danielle Madison (1974–2014), American actress
- Scotti Madison (born 1959), American baseball player
- Steve Madison (born 1983), American professional wrestler

== T ==
- Talia Madison, ring name of American professional wrestler Jamie Szantyr (born 1981), best known as Velvet Sky
- Thomas Madison (politician) (1746–1798), American soldier, planter and politician from Virginia
- Thomas Madison (settler), American settler in Illinois
- Thomas J. Madison Jr. (born 1966), American Federal Highway Administration head
- Tianna Madison (born 1985), American athlete
- Tim Madison (born 1967), American drummer
- Tobias Madison (born 1985), Swiss artist
- Tony Madison (born 1971), American basketball player
- Ts Madison (born 1977) American entertainer, entrepreneur and LGBT activist

== W ==
- William Madison (1762–1843), American general, brother of James Madison

== See also ==
- Maddison (surname)
