= Mobcap =

Type of headwear

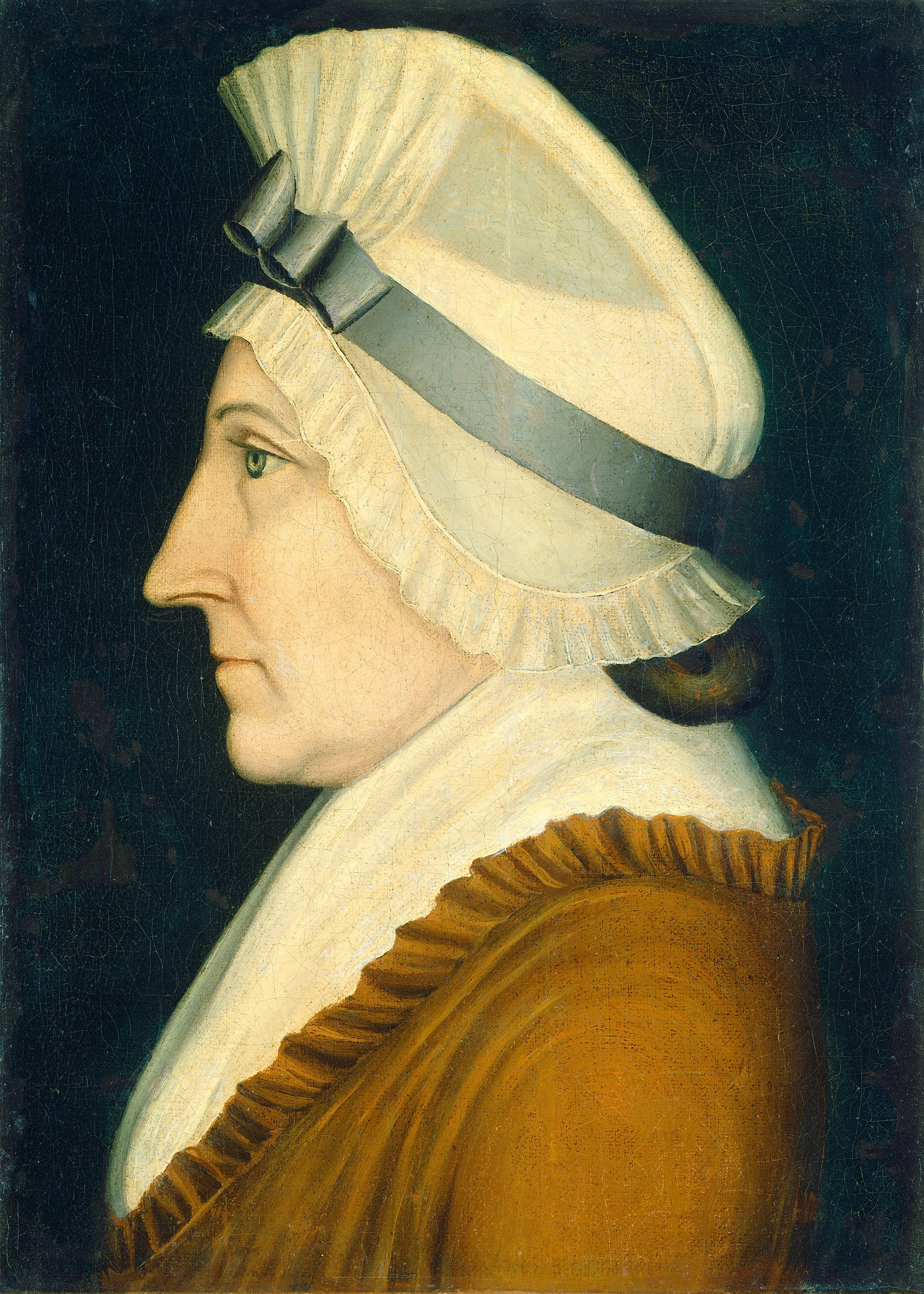
Simple American bonnet or mobcap, in a portrait by Benjamin Greenleaf, 1805

A mobcap (or mob cap or mob-cap) is a round, gathered or pleated cloth (usually linen) bonnet consisting of a caul to cover the hair, a frilled or ruffled brim, and (often) a ribbon band, worn by married women in the 18th and early 19th centuries, when it was called a "bonnet". These caps were always gathered to a flat, often curved, brim. The caul had a flat bottom and curved top. The bottom was typically gathered to fit the back neck with a drawstring, while the curved sides and top were tightly gathered and stitched to the brim, which typically had some curves, too. Originally an informal style, the bonnet became a high-fashion item as part of the adoption of simple "country" clothing in the later 18th century. It was an indoor fashion, and was worn under a hat for outdoor wear.

== Etymology ==
The origin of the term mobcap is a compound of mob "dishabille, casually dressed" + cap. It may be modeled on Dutch mop (muts) "woman's cap."

From at least 1730 to at least 1750, a single mob cap could be referred to as "a suit of mobs" or 'a suit of mobbs', while the plural mob caps could be described as 'suits of mobs' or 'suits of mobbs'.

== Variations ==
The one piece, ruffled, gathered circle mobcap often seen worn with historical costumes is a simplified, modern interpretation, rather than a copy of a period cap.

By the Victorian period, mobcaps lingered as the head covering of servants and nurses, and small mobcaps, not covering the hair, remained part of these uniforms into the early 20th century.

Modern versions of mobcaps are still worn in the pharmaceutical industry, in clean-rooms, and in other sectors where the hair has to be contained. These mobcaps are usually a simple circle shape with an elastic band and may be made of disposable materials such as spun-bound polypropylene so they are like a shower cap. They can also be made of nylon netting.

== Gallery ==
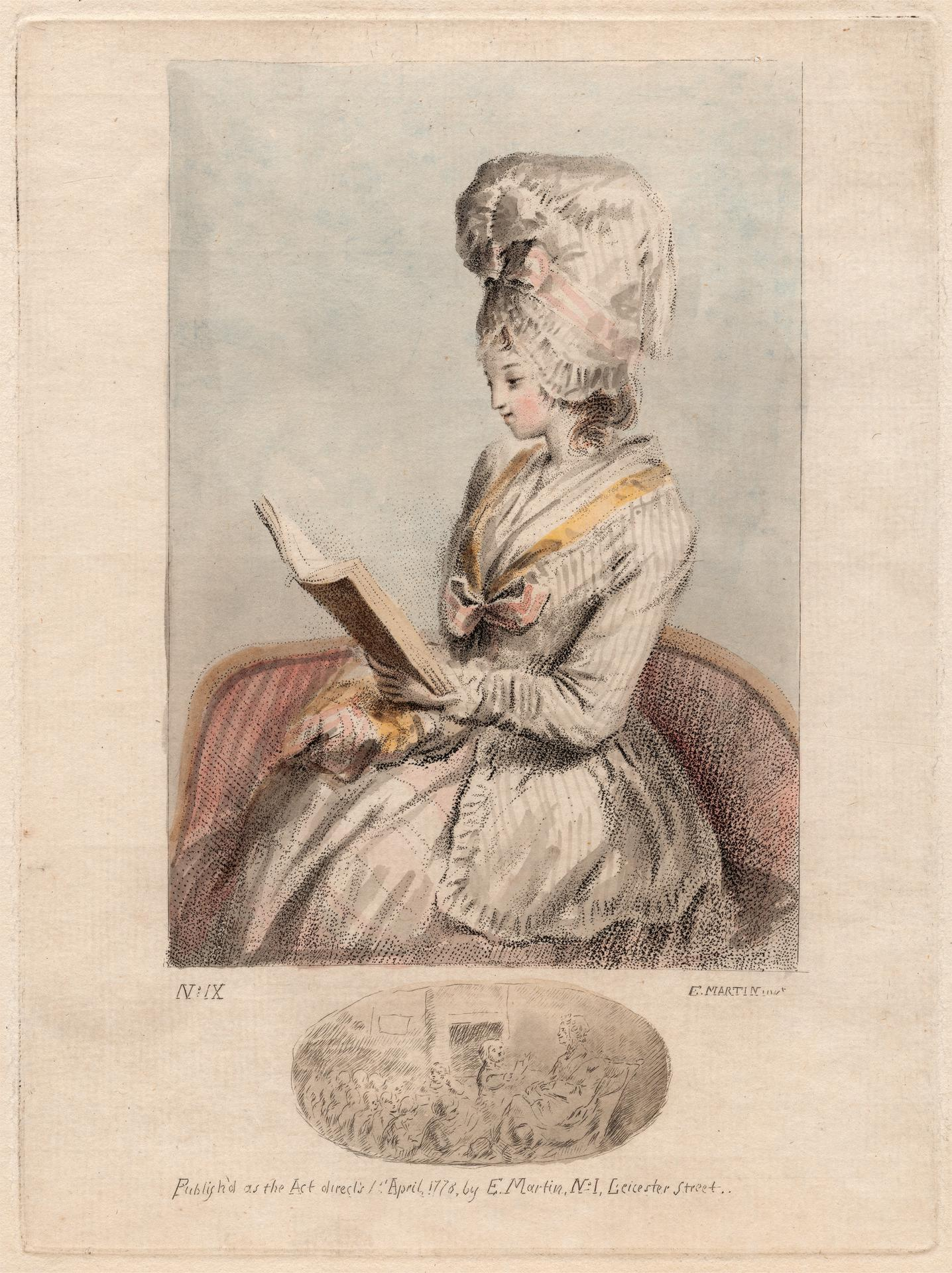
1778

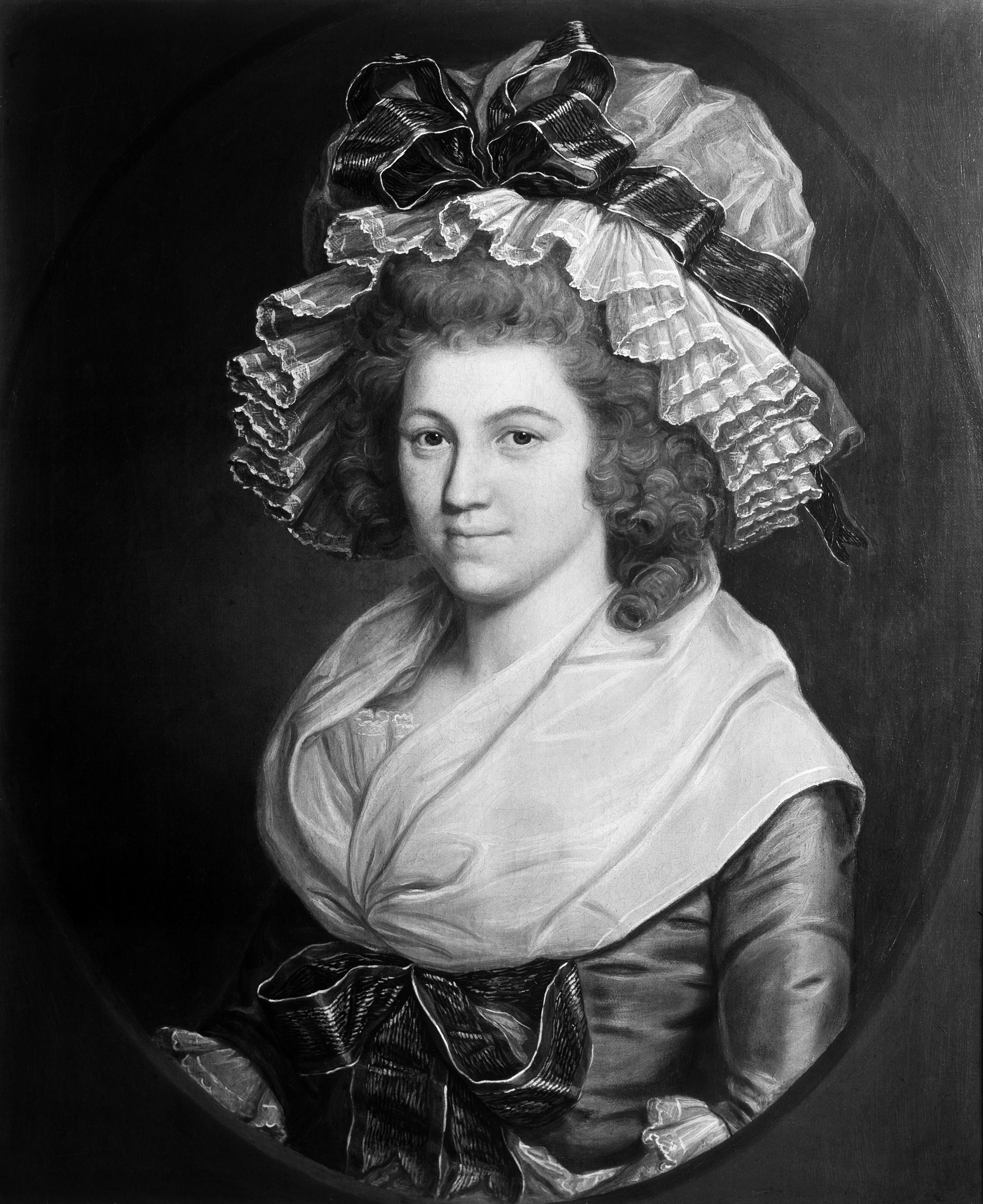
A portrait by English landscape and portrait painter, Joseph Wright of Derby, of an unidentified woman sporting a large mobcap

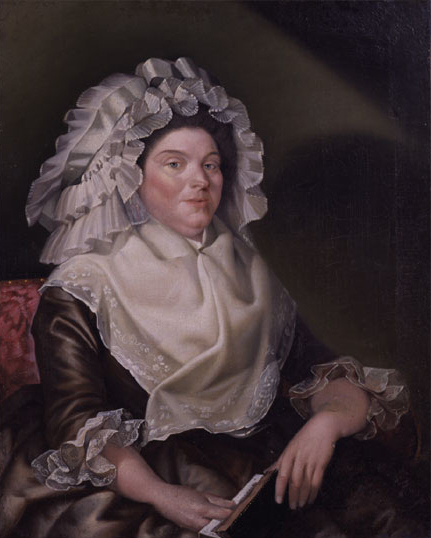
1789

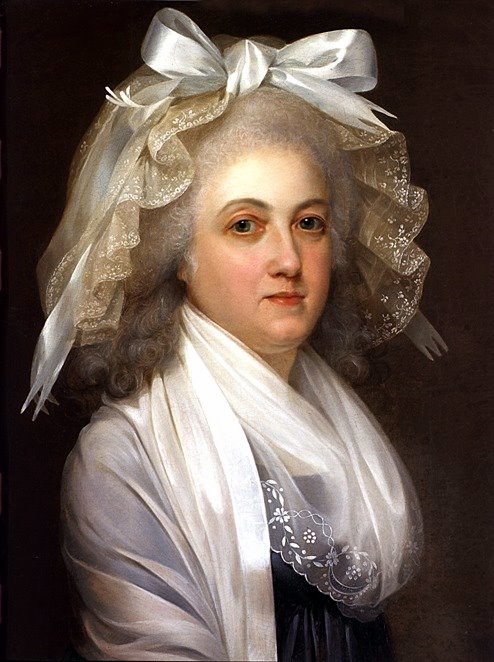
Marie Antoinette c. 1792

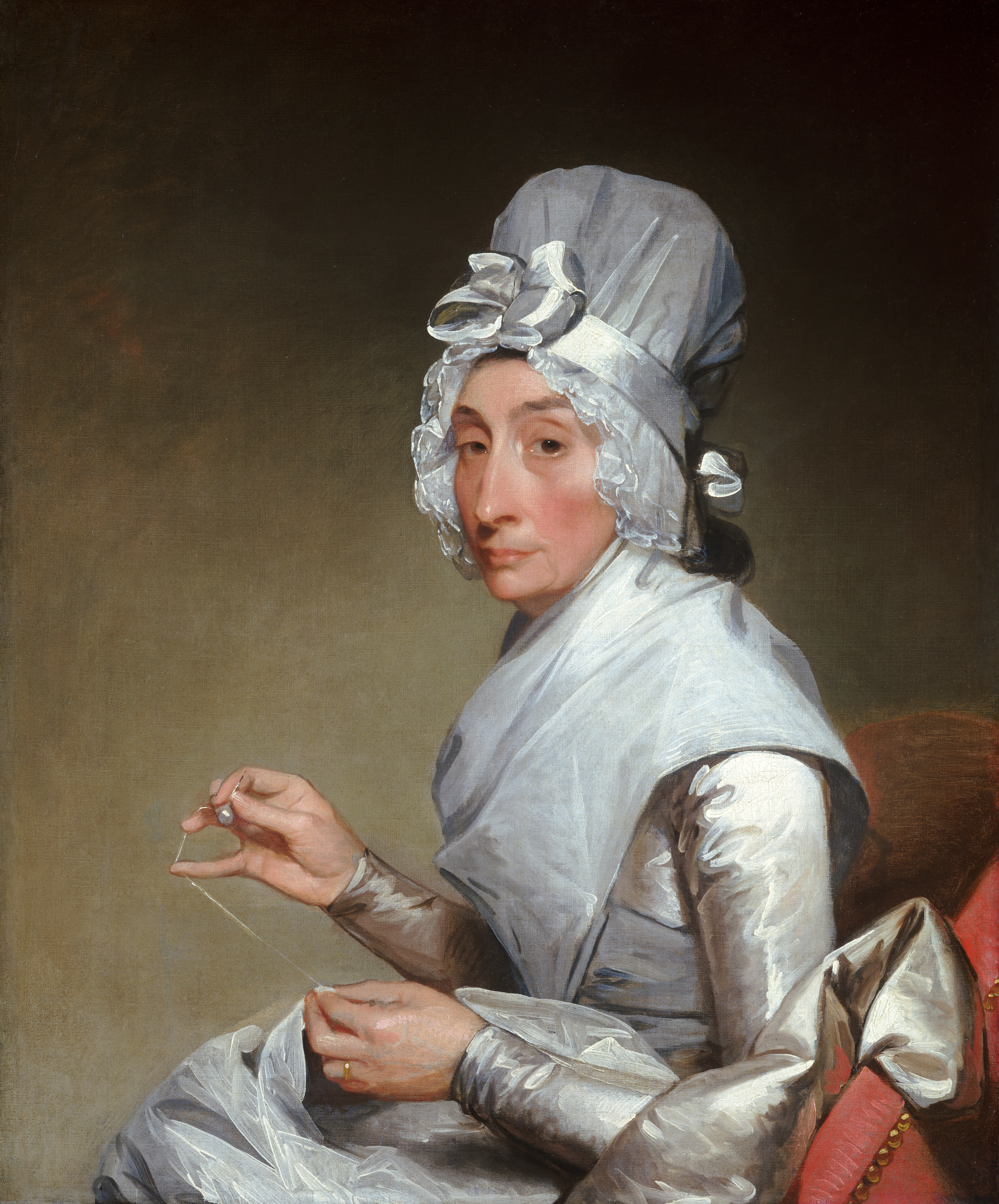
1793

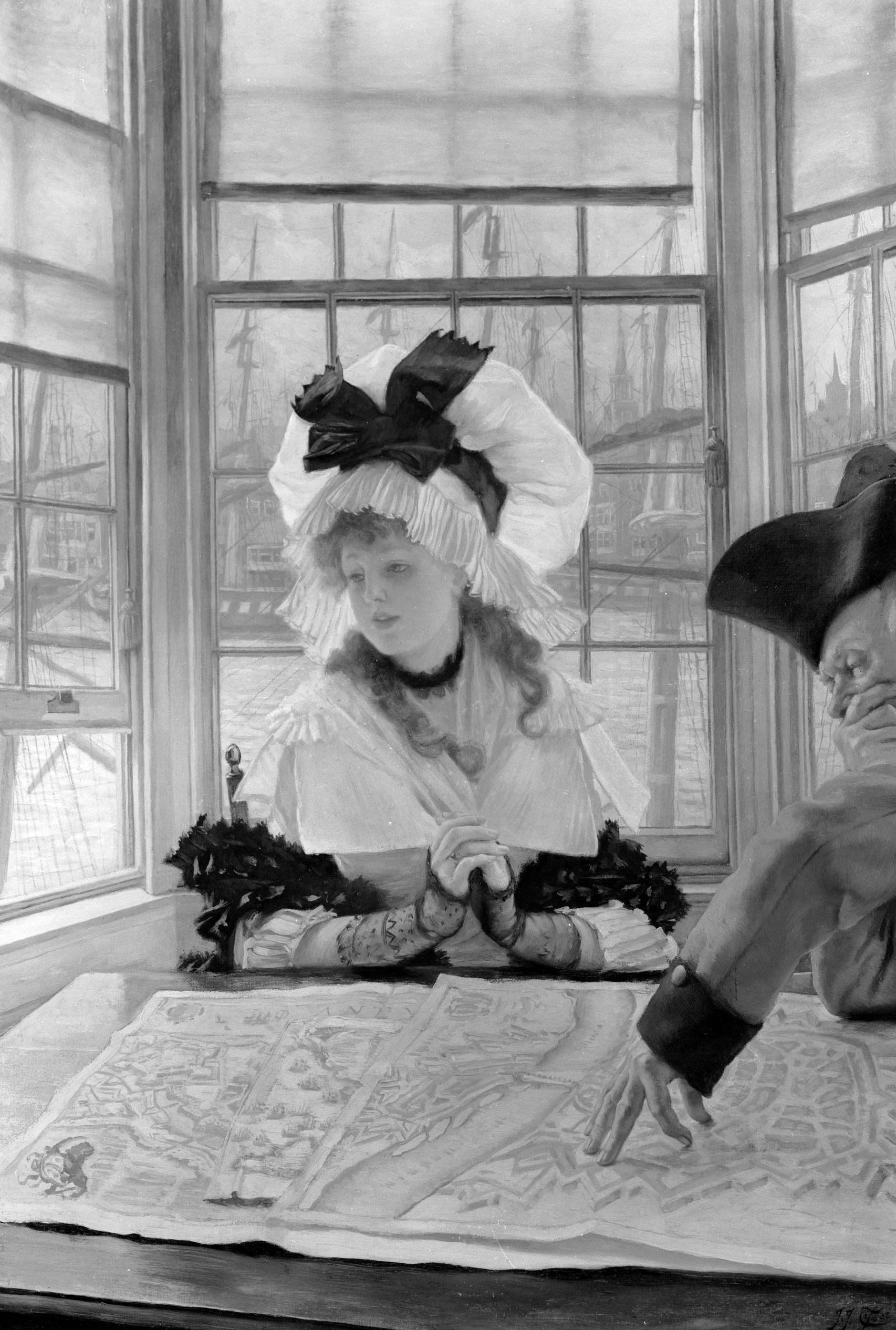
James Jacques Joseph Tissot's Man, Woman, and Map, which features a mobcap

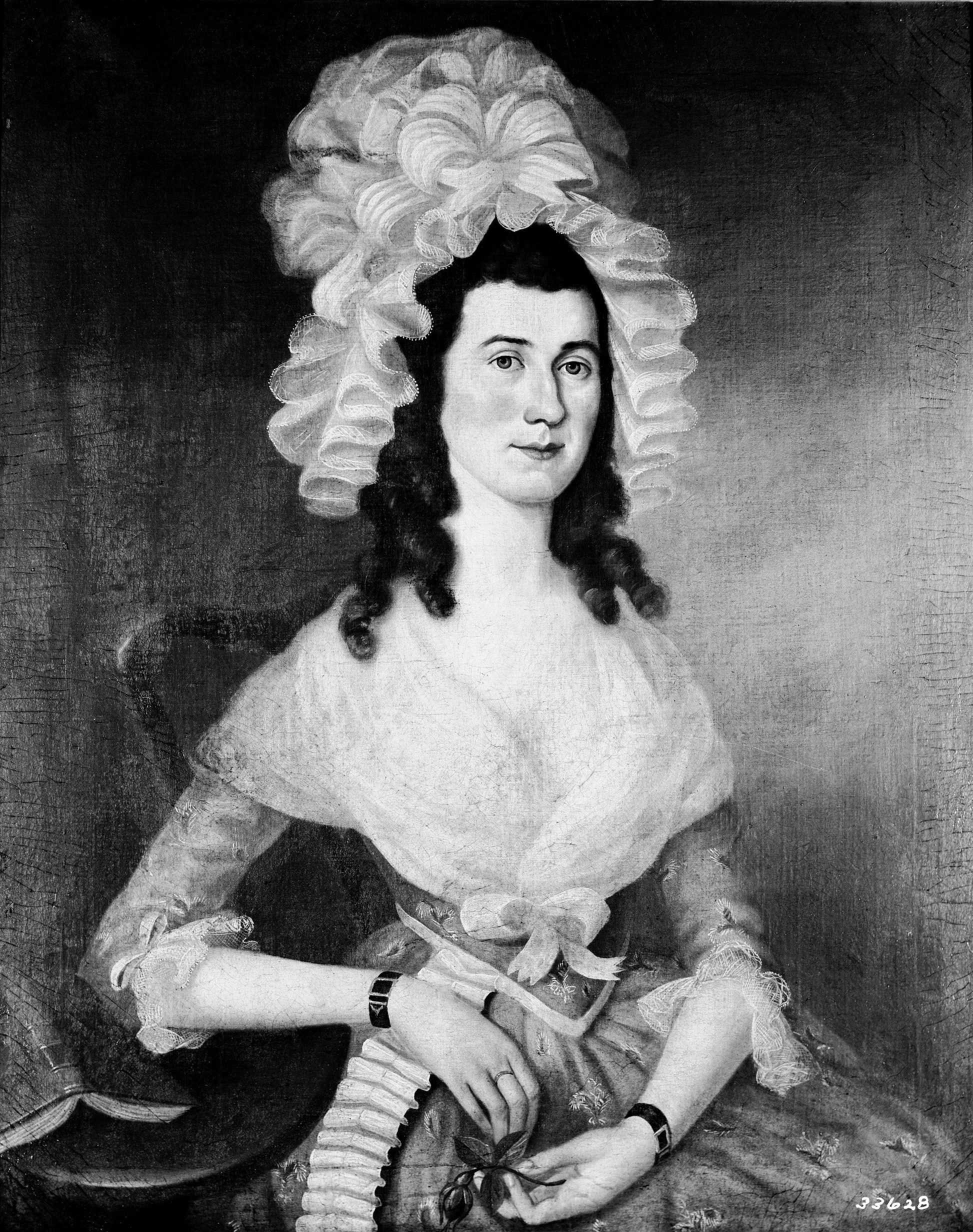
A portrait of Mrs. Herman Henry Schroeder (the former Suzannah Schwartz) by Charles Peale Polk, which was completed in about 1794

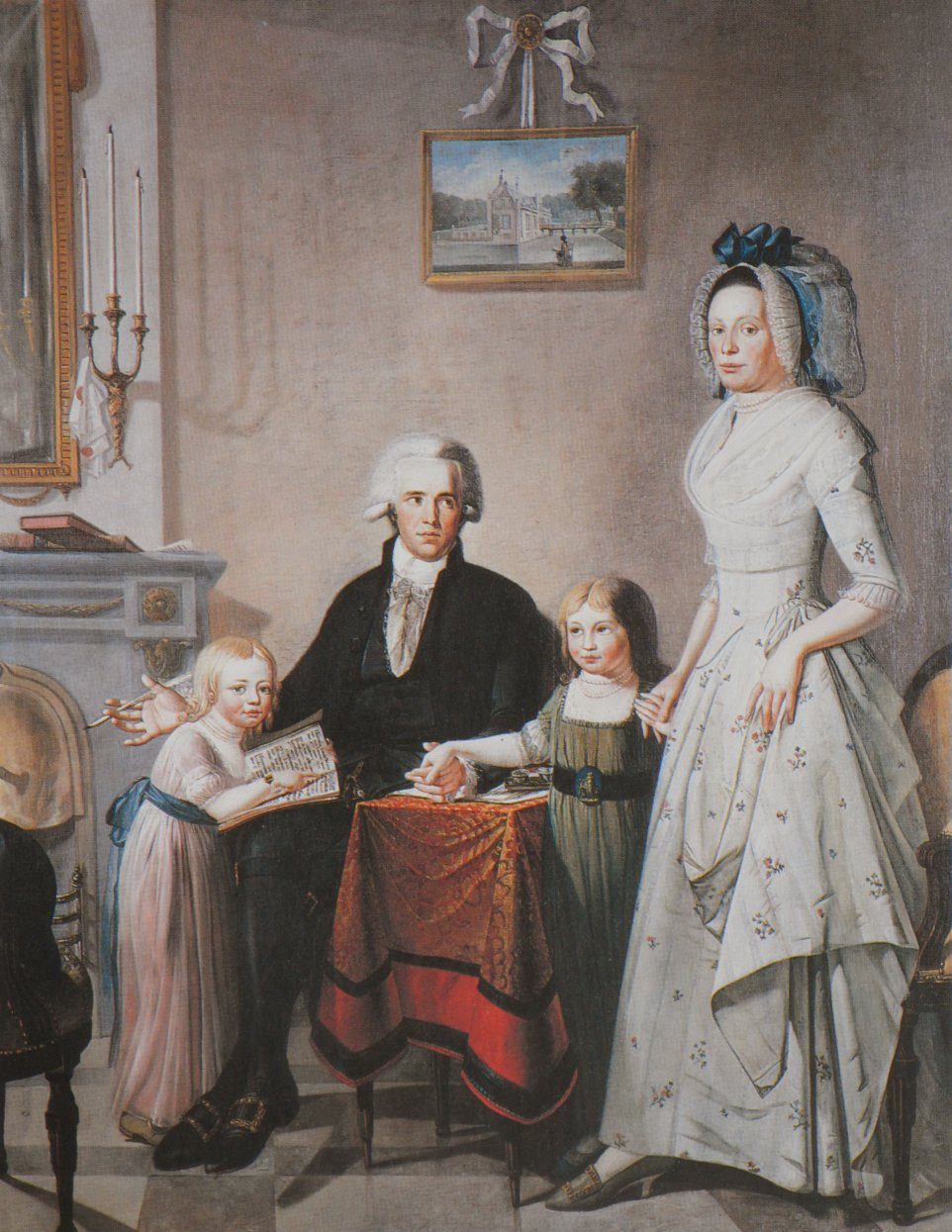
1796

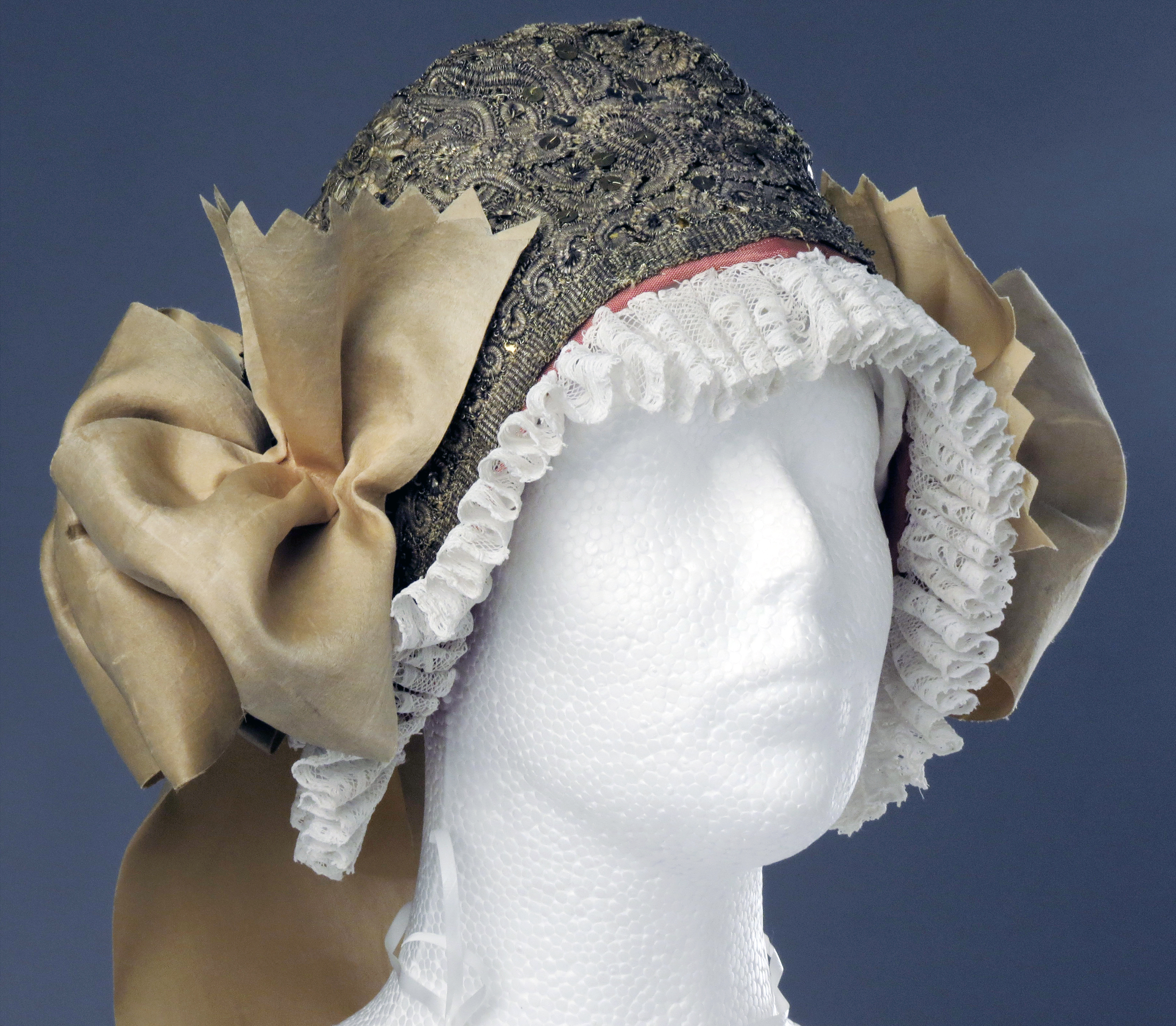
Mobcap with gold brocade, gold lace and sequins worn by wealthy ladies in Żywiec, Poland

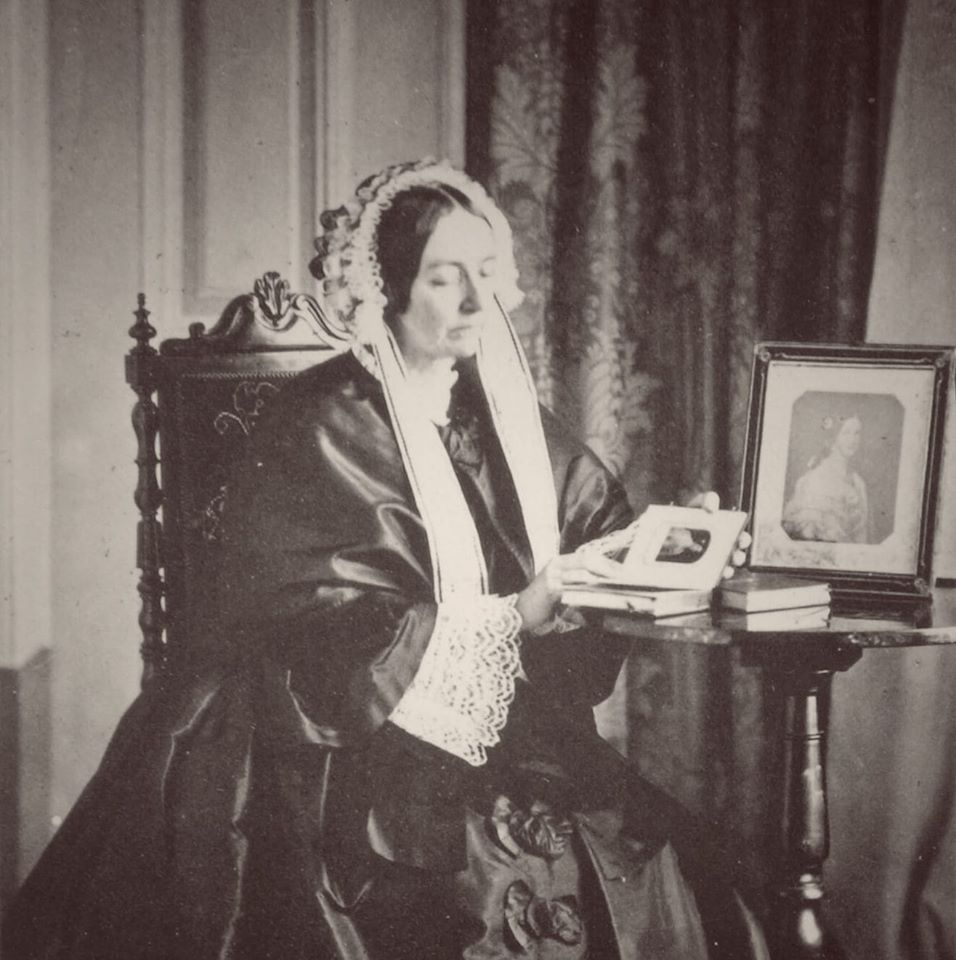
Empress Amélie of Brazil wearing a mobcap with lappets hanging down on each side of her neck

== See also ==
- List of hat styles
