= Charles Polk =

Charles Polk may refer to:

- Charles Peale Polk (1767–1822), American portrait painter
- Charles Polk Jr. (1788–1857), American politician in Delaware
