= Reverse glass painting =

Art form and painting technique

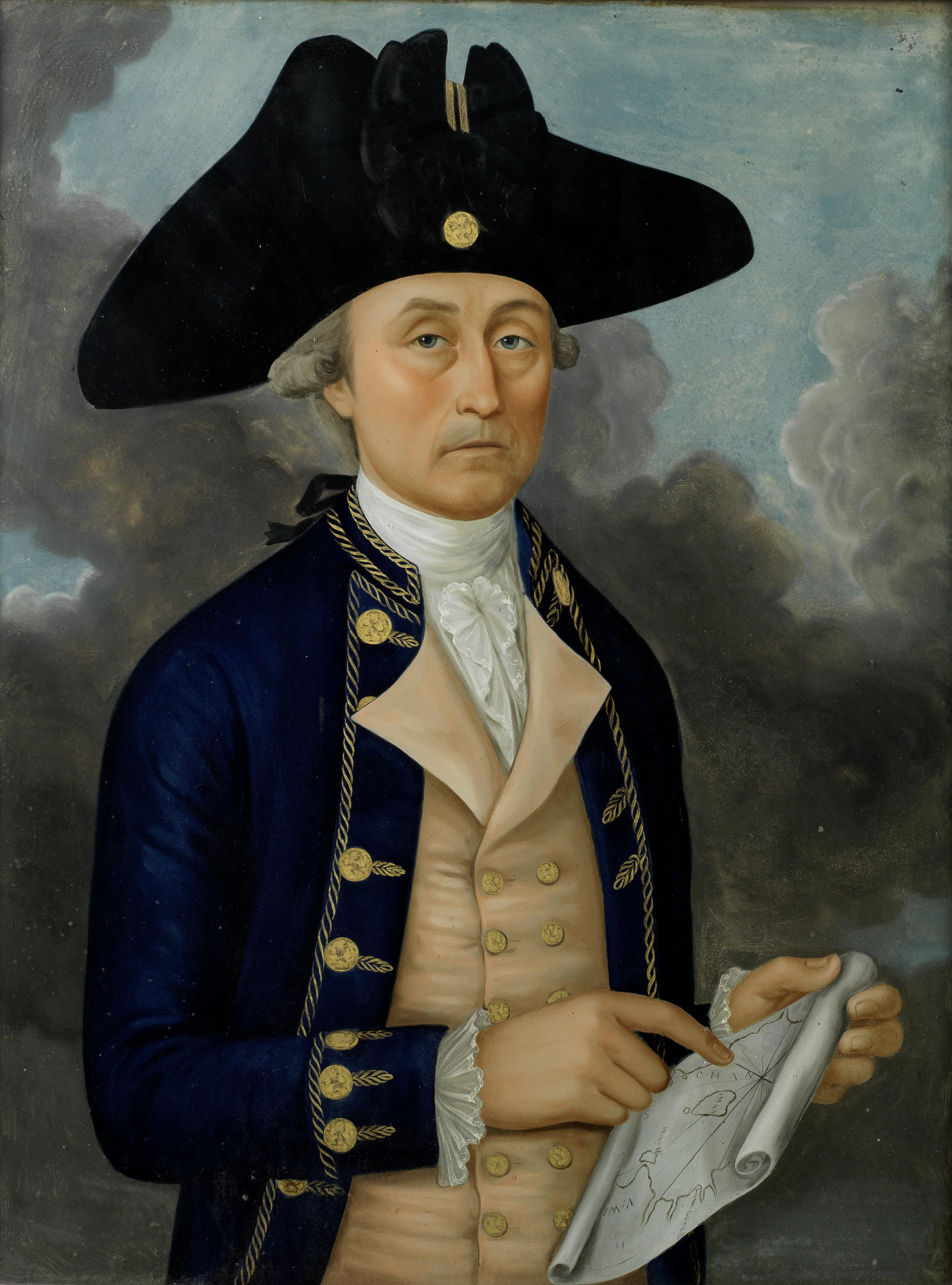
Captain Joseph Huddart – Chinese reverse glass painting from c. 1785 – 1789.

Reverse painting on glass is an art form consisting of applying paint to a piece of glass and then viewing the image by turning the glass over and looking through the glass at the image. Another term used to refer to the art of cold painting and gilding on the back of glass is verre églomisé, named after the French decorator Jean-Baptiste Glomy (1711–86), who framed prints using glass that had been reverse-painted. In German it is known as Hinterglasmalerei.

This art form has been around for many years. It was widely used for sacral paintings since the Middle Ages. The most famous was the art of icons in the Byzantine Empire. Later the painting on glass spread to Italy, where in Venice it influenced its Renaissance art. Since the middle of the 18th century, painting on glass became favored by the Church and the nobility throughout Central Europe. A number of clock faces were created using this technique in the early-to-mid-19th century. Throughout the 19th century painting on glass was widely popular as folk art in Austria, Bavaria, Moravia, Bohemia and Slovakia. Unfortunately, during the inter-war period (1914–1945) this traditional "naive" technique fell nearly to a complete oblivion and its methods of paint composition and structural layout had to be re-invented by combining acrylic and oil paints. A new method of reverse painting emerged using polymer glazing methods that permitted the artworks to be painted direct to an acrylic UV coating on the glass. The unique under glass effect retains a curious depth even though the layered painting on the glass was bonded to a final linen support and now stretcher bar mounted after being carefully removed from the original 'glass easel'. Current glass painting may disappear with the advent of using aerospace mylar as a preliminary support.

This style of painting is found in traditional Romanian icons originating from Transylvania. Jesuit missionaries brought it to China, and it spread to Japan from China during the Edo period. Japanese artists took up the technique during the nineteenth century. Reverse glass painting was also popular in India and Senegal in the nineteenth century.

== Technique ==
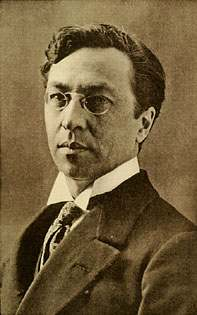
Vassily Kandinsky

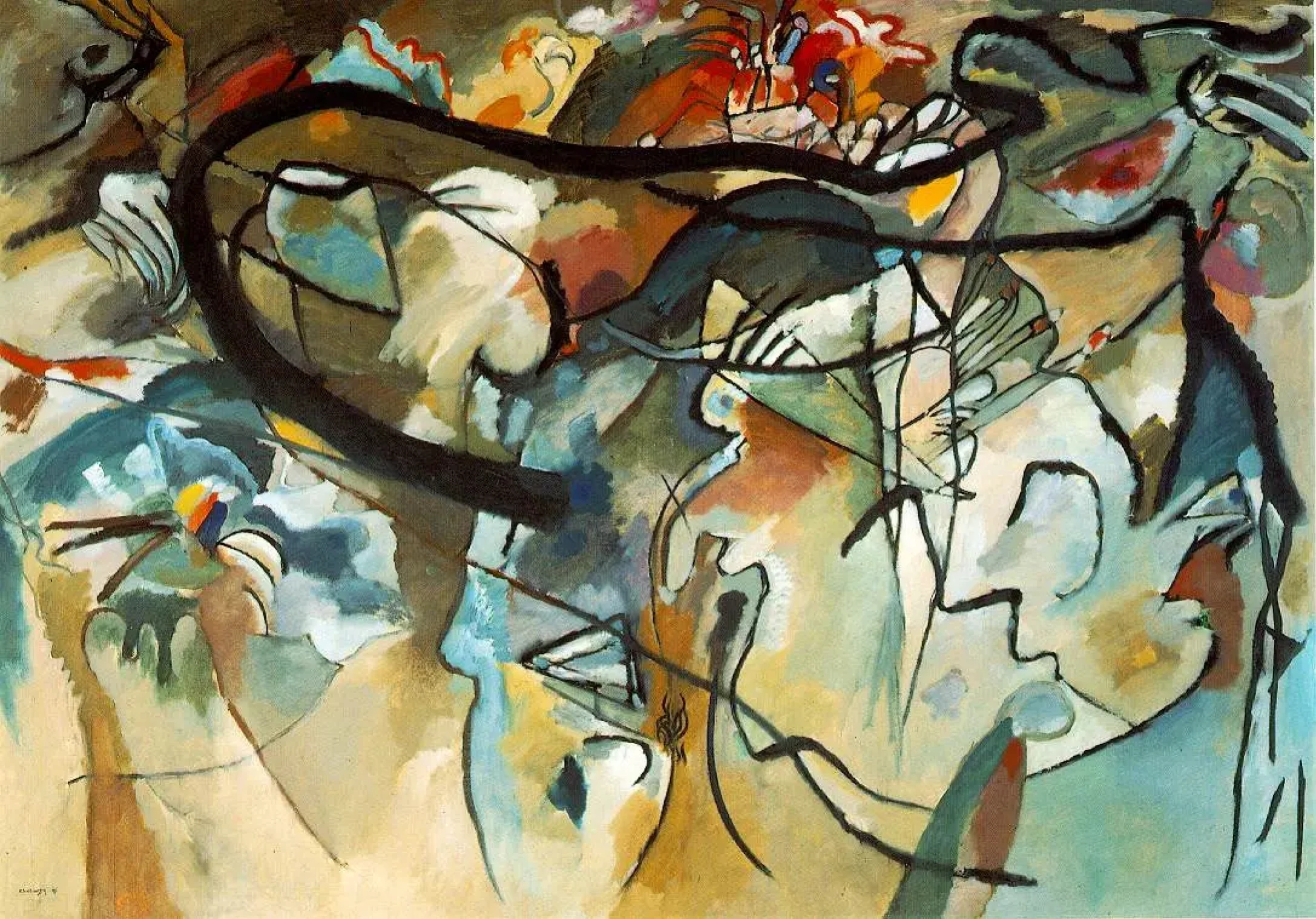
Vassily Kandinsky, Komposition V, 1911

One of the main challenges of creating a reverse glass painting is how layers are applied when painting. An illustration of this type is usually painted on the opposite side of the glass (the one not presented to the audience), following an opposite succession of layers of paint, applying the front most layer first and the background layer last. In these artworks, the final result must be well thought out before starting the piece and must be taken into account with each layer applied. In realism, for example, pupils and eyebrows are painted first, before applying color to the skin or the eye’s sclera.

=== Process ===
A reverse glass painting has three fundamental steps, line art, painting of internal areas, and background.

==== Line art ====
The first step in a reverse glass painting, (identified in paintings such as those of Vassily Kandinsky, a Russian painter who created more than 70 reverse paintings on glass) is line art, with black lines that show the primary idea of the painting. In Kandinsky's illustrations, thick and defined lines are applied at the beginning of each reverse glass painting.

==== Internal areas ====
Four of Kandinsky's works of art investigated in-depth show more than two layers of applied paint that vary in thickness. The technique varies, but Kandinsky's paintings show internal layers with rapid sweeping brush strokes in large regions and stippling of color in other areas. To create depth, he paints wet-on-wet and sometimes on top but slightly off to the side to blend the colors.

==== Background ====
In reverse glass paintings, details and shadows usually are painted first, while backgrounds are painted last. Different colors can be applied one after the other after each layer has dried or a thin layer of paint before drying. In paintings like those of Kandinsky, black cardboards were used as background to intensify the depth of colors. In others, black backgrounds of paper or wood were necessary since reverse glass paintings are viewed using reflected light rather than traditional transmitted light.

== Materials and methods ==
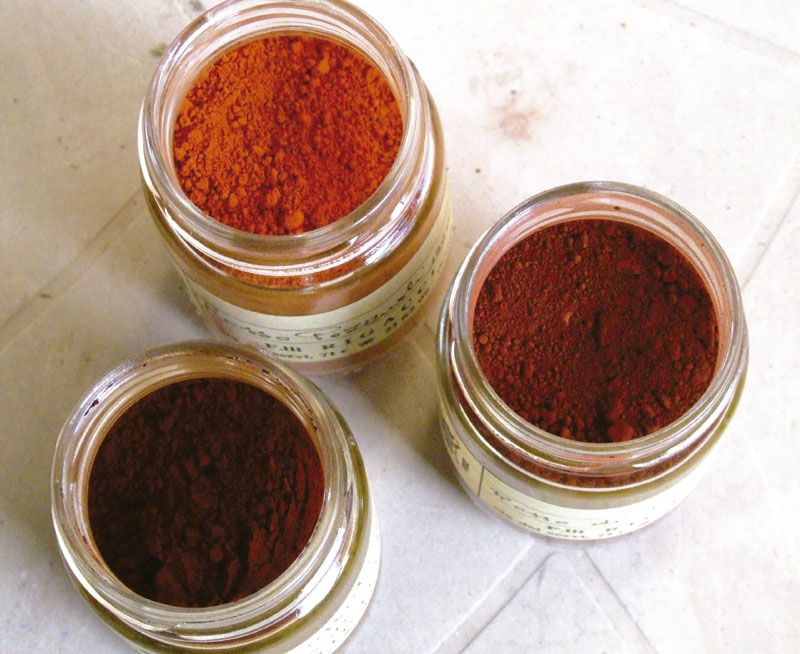
Natural Pigments

=== Glass ===
As its name suggests, a reverse glass painting utilizes glass instead of a canvas. One of the most distinctive aspects of this type of painting is the glass that works as a paint holder for the piece. The glass used to create these pictures is usually very resistant. It was used in reverse paintings during the 16th and 18th centuries in Europe and China as a protective layer for pieces to last longer and preserve over the years.

Because of the reverse order of the application of pigment, starting a painting on the back side of the glass can be complicated. At the same time, its crystal-clear structure makes it possible to copy an image or idea from a paper template. Since ancient times, glass has been created by melting a mixture of silica with alkaline and a stabilizer. Unlike wood or canvas, glass requires preparation before applying color for long-lasting adhesion. Since Roman times, cold painting on glass has been practiced by applying oil paint and lacquer onto a glass area. But due to the speed of deterioration, the technique of reverse glass was developed for the glass to work as a protective varnish.

=== Pigments ===
The pigments' size affects the paint's cohesion and the adhesive characteristics. A study in which nine pigments were tested implemented different shapes and sizes to observe the influence of adhesion of the pigments on the glass. Of all pigments studied, Vermilion was the easiest to observe. It had a more considerable hardening, especially with the addition of adhesive. Pigments were more adherent on homogeneous layers of adhesive, which explains the need for a well-applied adhesive layer to achieve better preservation and application of color.

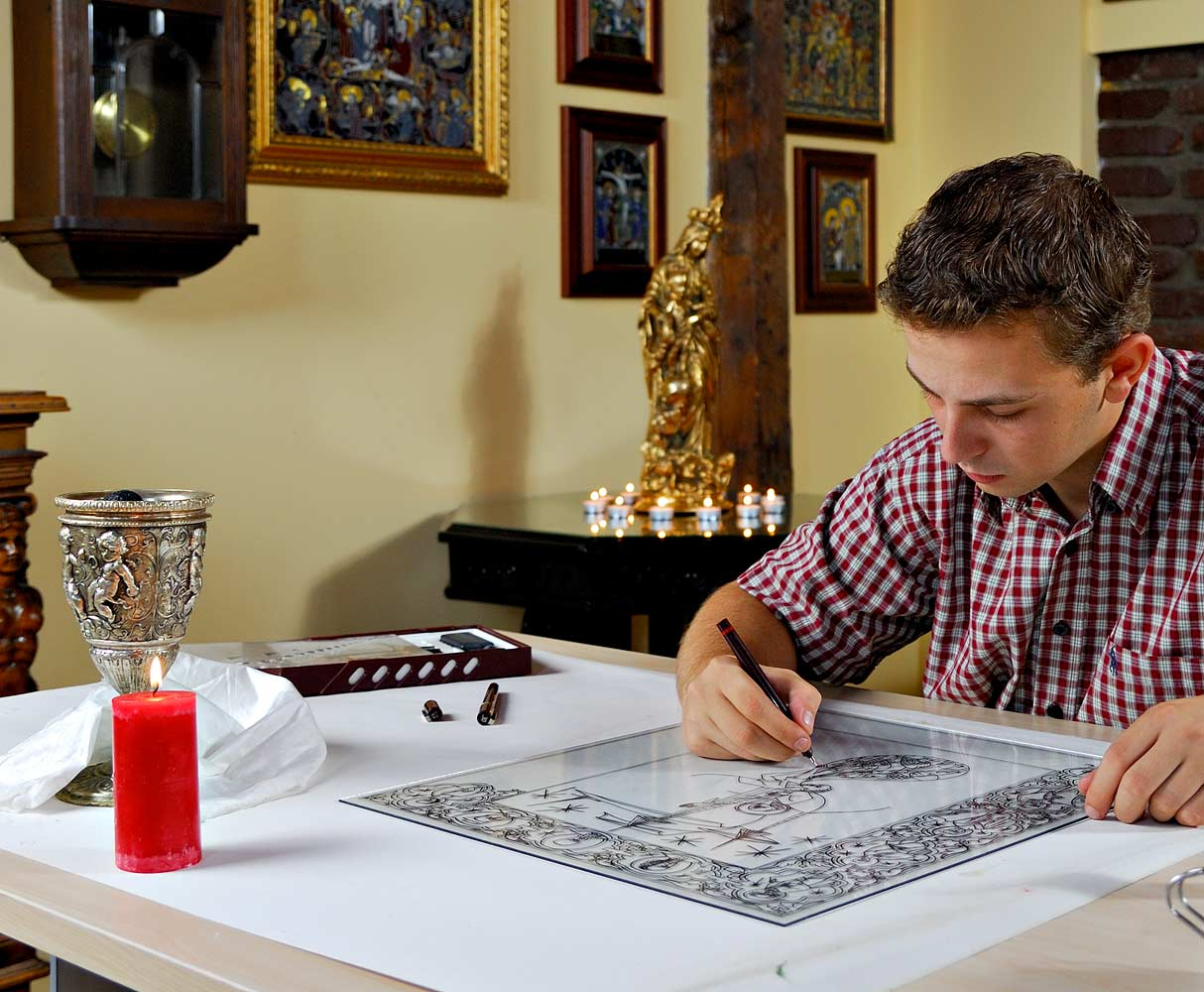
George Huszar creating an Icon

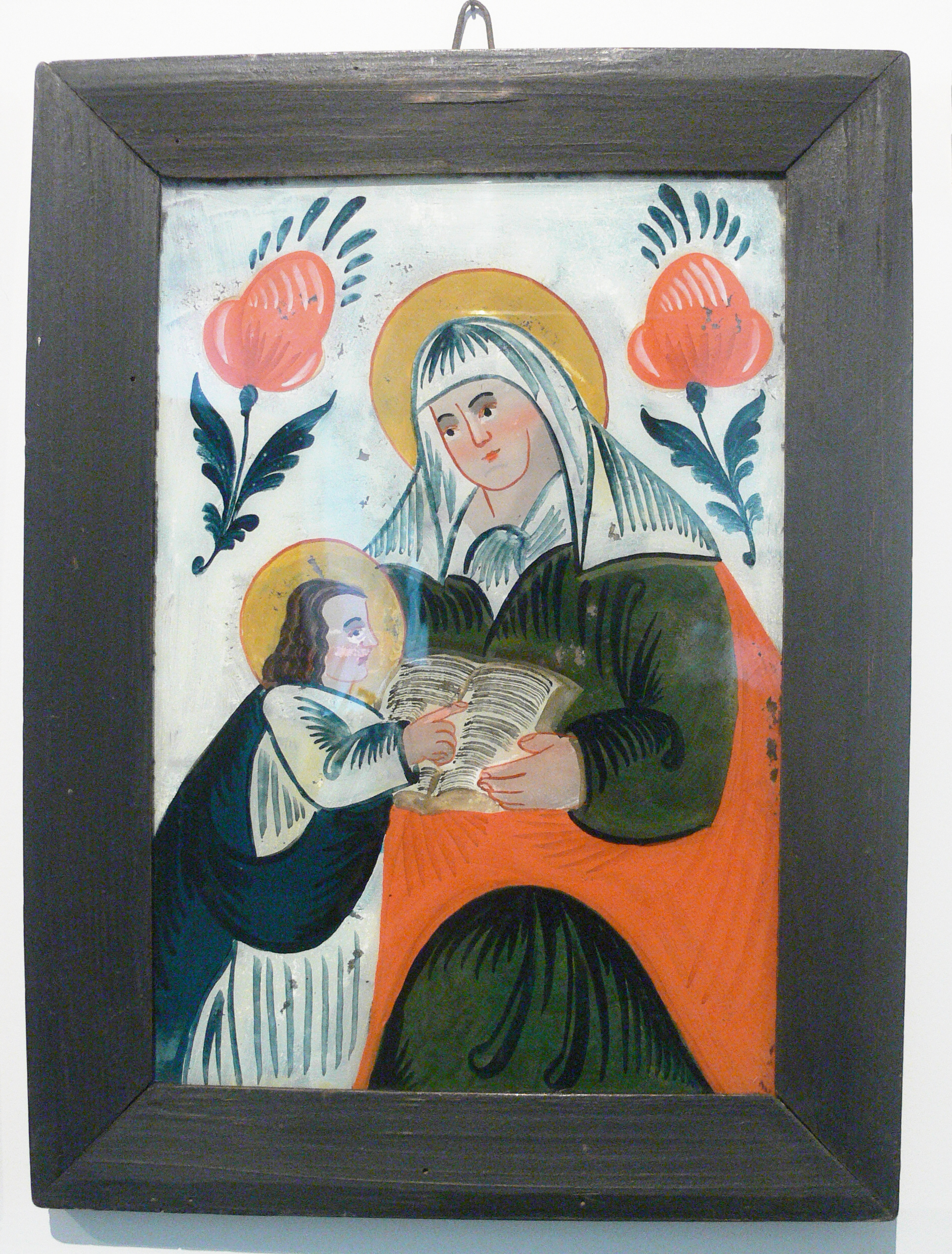
"Saint Anne teaches Mary", Austrian folk painting, early 19th century

== In the United States ==
Two American artists, Marsden Hartley and Rebecca Salsbury James, made artworks using reverse glass painting. Both were inspired by American folk art that included painting on glass, for instance, tinsel painting.

Hartley's work in this medium began in 1917. He painted about a dozen still lifes of curvilinear vessels with flowers using this method, but after his initial enthusiasm, he gave up reverse glass painting in less than a year.

James began reverse painting in 1928, after Hartley introduced her to the technique. Over the next three decades, she created some 200 floral still lifes, desert landscapes, and non-objective portraits in this medium.

Other American artists working in the medium of reverse glass painting include Benjamin Greenleaf.

== In China ==
China, Beijing palace workshops, Qing Dynasty (1644-1911), Qianlong reign - Screen with European Figures (obverse) and Landscape (reverse) with Stand - 1964.243 - Cleveland Museum of Art

=== Chinese influence ===
During the 19th and 20th centuries, China had one of the most significant influences on art. Chinese reverse glass painting greatly influenced artists like Gabriel Münter, Wassily Kandinsky, Franz Marc, and Heinrich Campendonk.

- Franz Marc owned a section of Chinese pith paper paintings from the nineteenth century.
- Marc and Kandinsky shared letters that mentioned Chinese and Japanese artworks.
- Qing Dynasty Artist, Large Party at Throne, circa 1800.
  Historical analysis also showed an apparent Asian influence of several Blave Raiter reverse glass paintings.

Chinese paintings

In Chinese reverse glass paintings, human figures are usually outlined first with thin black lines, in contrast to those of Kandinsky’s, which generally were outlined with thick black lines. After the line art, Chinese reverse glass paintings are filled with different colors applied to various areas to create the details. After the colors, a thin white layer of paint is applied as background to the reverse side of the painting, differently from non-Chinese reverse glass paintings that use black to intensify the colors on the back side of the glass.

Color palette

A traditional Chinese color palette for reverse glass paintings includes the following colors:

Orpiment	Cinnabar	Lead white	Iron oxide earths	Azurite	Malachite	Ultramarine blue	Calm shell white	Lead red	Natural dyes

Chinese reverse glass paintings also show a significant orientation toward the colors of the rainbow.

== In Iran ==
Reverse glass painting (Persian: pošt-e šišeh) was first seen in Iran during the 15th century, but the art flourished starting in the 19th century. One of the earliest surviving examples of this art in Iran is from the Qajar dynasty, during the reign of Fath Ali Shah (from c. 1797–1834). During the Qajar-era, many large reverse glass portraiture paintings were made, however few survived breakage due to their size and the thinness of the glass used.
