= Eleanor Madison =

Mother of James Madison (1731–1829)

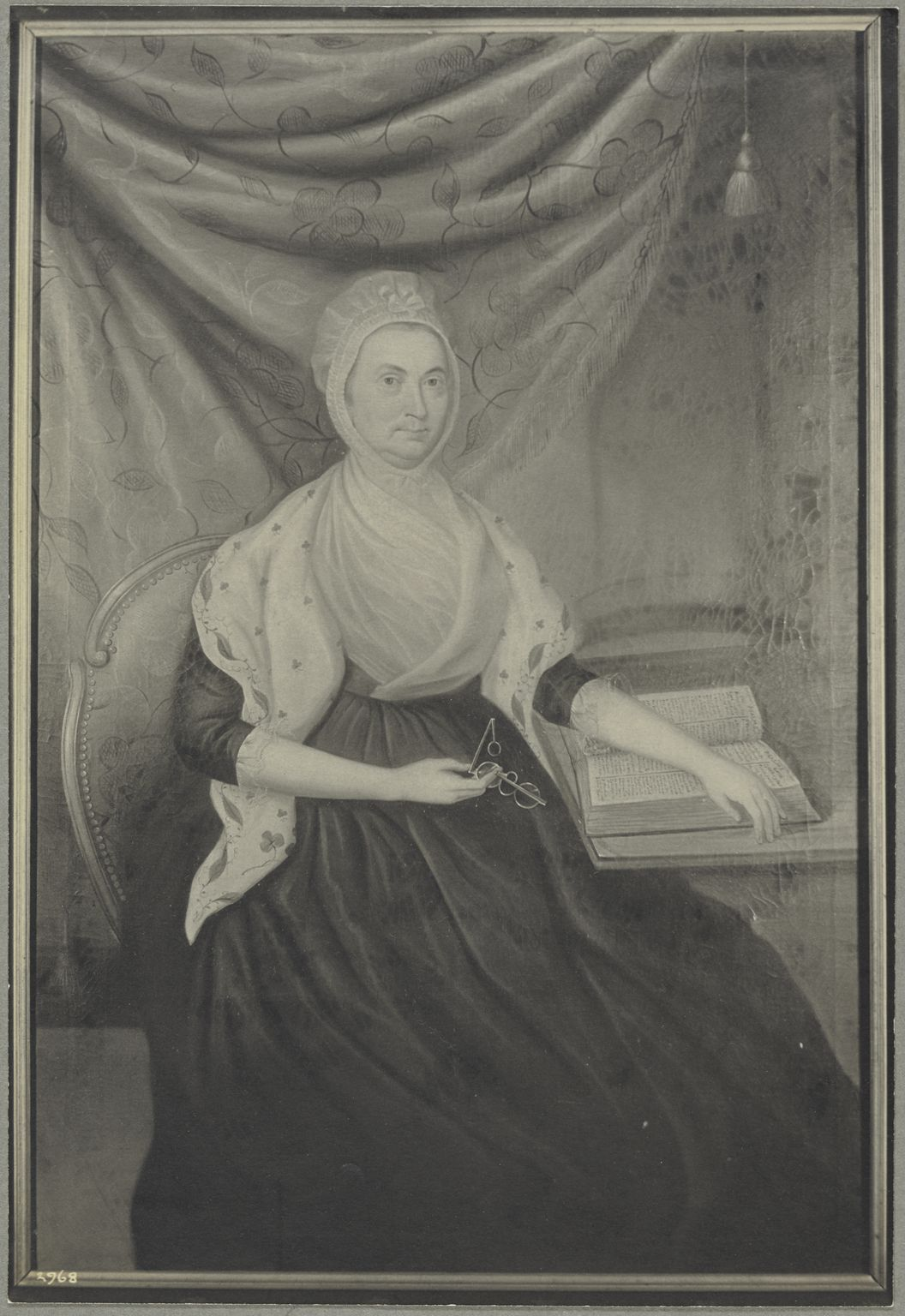
- Portrait by Charles Peale Polk, c. 1799
- Born: Eleanor Rose Conway; January 9, 1731; Port Conway, Virginia, British America
- Died: February 11, 1829 (aged 98); Montpelier, Virginia, U.S.
- Resting place: Madison Family Cemetery
- Occupation: Planter
- Spouse: James Madison Sr.
- Children: 12, including James Madison and William Madison
- Parent(s): Francis Conway (father); Rebecca Catlett Conway (mother)

Eleanor Rose Madison (née Conway; January 9, 1731 – February 11, 1829) was a Virginia socialite and planter who was the mother of James Madison Jr., the Founding Father and 4th president of the United States, and Lieutenant General William Madison. She has been described as one of the strongest influences in the life of her eldest son, James Madison Jr., and has been credited for her efforts to preserve the Montpelier estate.

== Early life and family ==
Nelly Conway was born on January 9, 1731, in Port Conway, Virginia, the daughter of Francis Conway, Sr., a wealthy planter and tobacco merchant (the area's namesake) and Rebecca Catlett Conway. She grew up on the Belle Grove plantation and estate.

She married James Madison Sr. on September 13, 1749, at the age of 18. They had 12 children:

- James Madison Jr. (March 16, 1751 – June 28, 1836)
- Francis Madison (June 18, 1753 – April 5, 1800)
- Ambrose Madison (January 27, 1755 – October 3, 1793)
- Catlett Madison (February 10, 1758 – March 18, 1758)
- Eleanor Conway Madison (February 14, 1760 – December 24, 1802)
- William Madison (May 5, 1762 – July 20, 1843)
- Sarah Catlett Madison (August 17, 1764 – October 17, 1843)
- Unnamed son (1766–1766), died one day after birth
- Elizabeth Madison (February 6, 1768 – May 17, 1775)
- unnamed stillborn son (July 12, 1770)
- Reuben Madison (September 19, 1771 – June 5, 1775)
- Frances Taylor Madison (October 4, 1774 – October 4, 1823)

== Married life ==
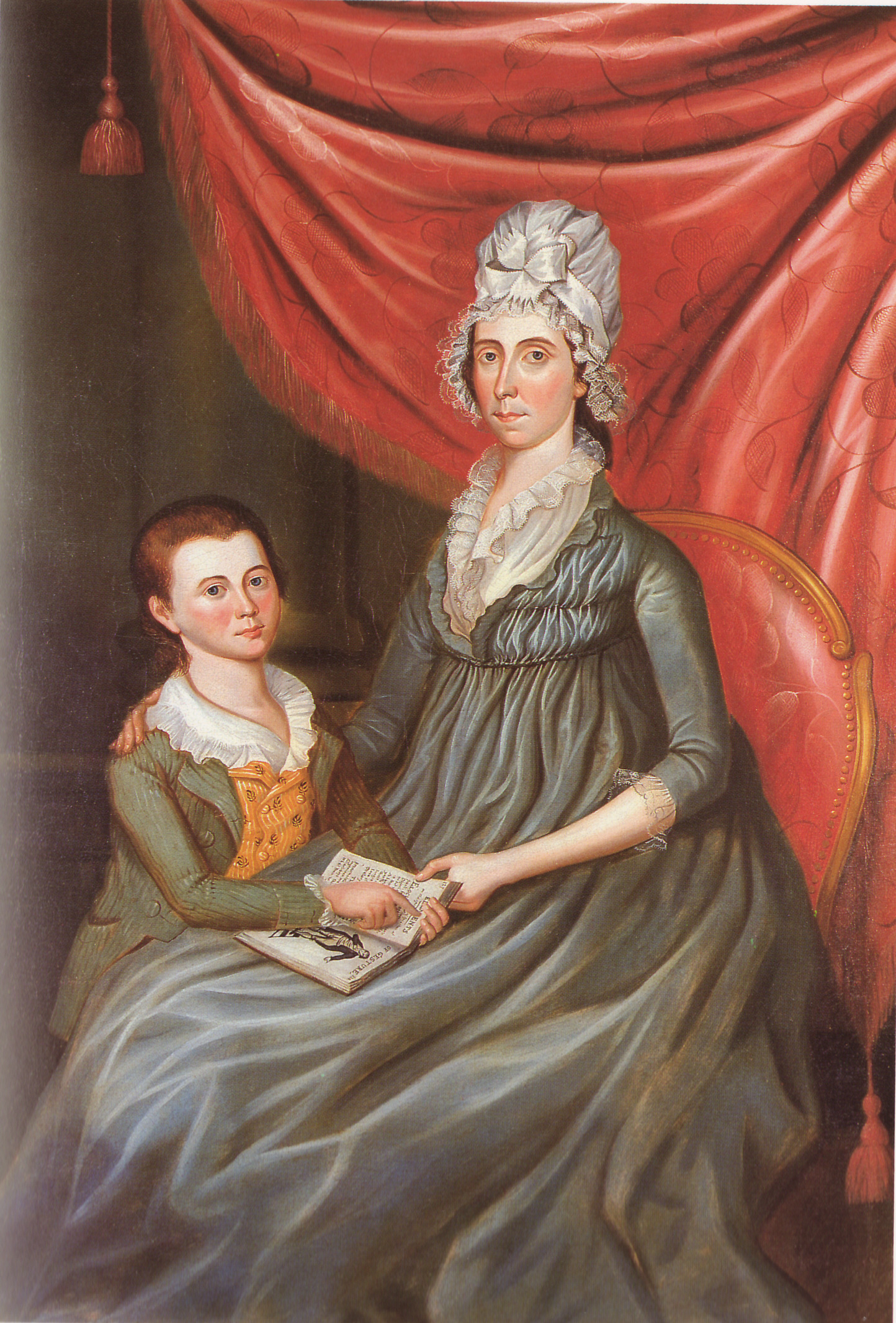
Portrait of Nelly Madison's daughter Eleanor Hite and her son, James Madison Hite, by Charles Peale Polk

As an adult, Madison took charge of the early education of her children, educating them in reading, writing, and arithmetic.

As the Madison children grew up, she played the role of active caregiver, often traveling to the homes of her family members who were sick or in need of support. She was actively involved in the running of the Montpelier household and 2,650 acre estate, and her family owned over 100 enslaved persons and several indentured servants.

During the American Revolution, while her husband served as chairman of the Orange County Committee of Safety and as a colonel in the Virginia militia, Nelly Madison supported a drive among the women of Virginia to raise funds and supplies for the Continental Army. She corresponded with Martha Jefferson during this period. Nationally, the Ladies Association raised $300,000 to buy linen shirts for Washington's army.

Madison was an avid reader and highly informed in public affairs and current events, and was described by Mary Cutts as a "lady of excellent education, strong mind, and good judgement." During her son's presidency (1809 to 1817), Nelly received stipend for her healths, and her son and his wife Dolley both wrote to her. Madison was an active Episcopalian and admirer of preacher James Waddel.

Following the death of her husband in 1801, Madison continued to reside in her own wing of Montpelier and maintained a close relationship with her son James and daughter-in-law Dolley. She would often receive visitors in her semi-private wing on the south end of the residence and had her own household.

== Death ==
Madison died on February 11, 1829, at the age of 98, and is buried at Montpelier.

Historians have regarded Madison as one of the strongest female influences in the life of President James Madison, and she has been credited for her efforts to preserve and enhance the Montpelier estate through various renovations.

== Legacy ==
Her descendants include Confederate Brigadier General James Edwin Slaughter (her great-grandson).

Montpelier, the Madison family's estate, has been designated a National Historic Landmark. Archeologists have restored her traditional sitting room in the house.

Her will is in the permanent collection of the Library of Congress, and a portrait of her is owned by the Maryland Historical Society. The two portraits of Madison by Charles Peale Polk have been regarded as "masterpieces."

Author William Judson Hampton wrote that her son James inherited his mother's "deep studious nature" and that she influenced his religious convictions and interest in religious liberty.
