= James Madison Sr. =

American planter and politician (1723-1801); father of James Madison

Colonel James Madison Sr.
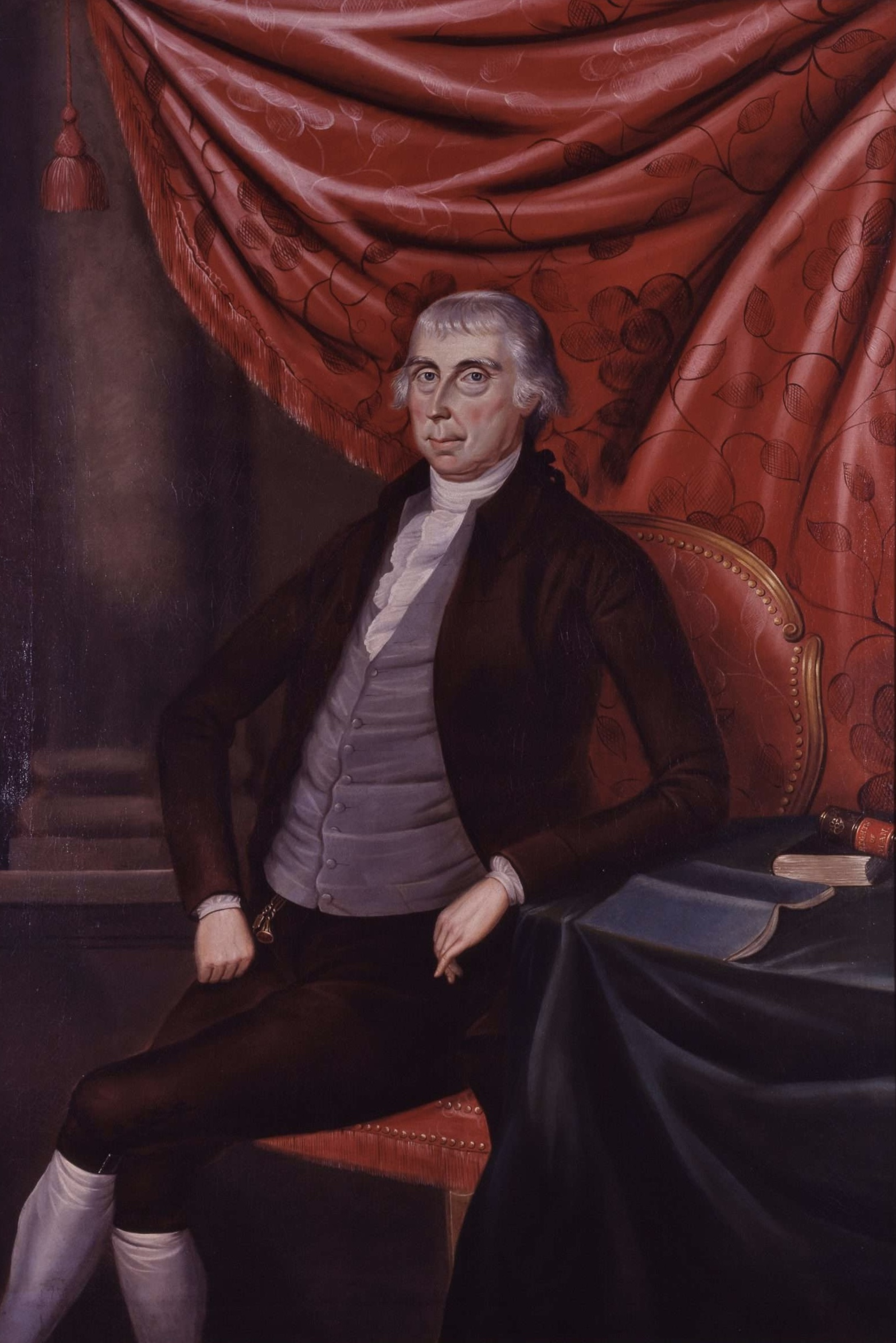
- Portrait by Charles Peale Polk, 1799
- Born: James Madison; March 27, 1723; Orange County, Virginia, British America
- Died: February 27, 1801 (aged 77); Montpelier, Orange County, Virginia, U.S.
- Resting place: Madison Family Cemetery
- Occupations: Tobacco planter and politician
- Spouse: Eleanor Rose Conway
- Children: 12, including James Madison and William Madison
- Parent(s): Ambrose Madison (father); Frances Taylor (mother)
- Relatives: John Madison Jr. (grandfather); Lt. Col. John Madison Sr. (great-grandfather); James Taylor (grandfather); Richard Taylor (first cousin); Zachary Taylor (first cousin, once removed)
- Military career
- Allegiance: Virginia
- Branch: Virginia Militia
- Rank: Colonel

Col. James Madison Sr. (March 27, 1723 – February 27, 1801) was a prominent Virginia planter and politician who served as a colonel in the Virginia militia during the American Revolutionary War. He inherited Mount Pleasant, later known as Montpelier, a large tobacco plantation in Orange County, Virginia and, with the acquisition of more property, had 5,000 acres and became the largest landowner in the county. He was the father of James Madison Jr., the Founding Father and 4th president of the United States, who inherited what he called Montpelier, and Lieutenant General William Madison, and great-grandfather of Confederate Brigadier General James Edwin Slaughter.

== Early life ==
Madison's parents were planter and politician Ambrose Madison and his wife Frances Taylor (daughter of James Taylor and aunt of Richard Taylor). and was born in 1723 in Orange County, Virginia. When he was nine, his family moved to their new plantation of Mount Pleasant in 1732. His father had hired slaves and an overseer to clear it, work that had been going on for five years to establish cultivation. That summer (1732) his father died at age 36 in August after a short illness.

The family or the sheriff believed he was poisoned by slaves, and three were charged in the case and convicted by justices of the Commission of Peace. Unusually, only one slave was executed; Dido and Turk, owned by the widow Frances Taylor Madison, were returned to her to serve as laborers after being punished by whipping.

James was tutored and trained to be a planter and slaveholder, and member of the landed gentry. His widowed mother never remarried, which was unusual at that time for a woman her age; she had extensive Taylor family in the county. As the eldest son, James Madison Sr. inherited Mount Pleasant when he came of age in 1744. He called the plantation Home House. Acquiring more land, he eventually owned 5,000 acres, making him the largest landowner in Orange County. By the time of his death, he owned 108 slaves.

== Marriage and family ==
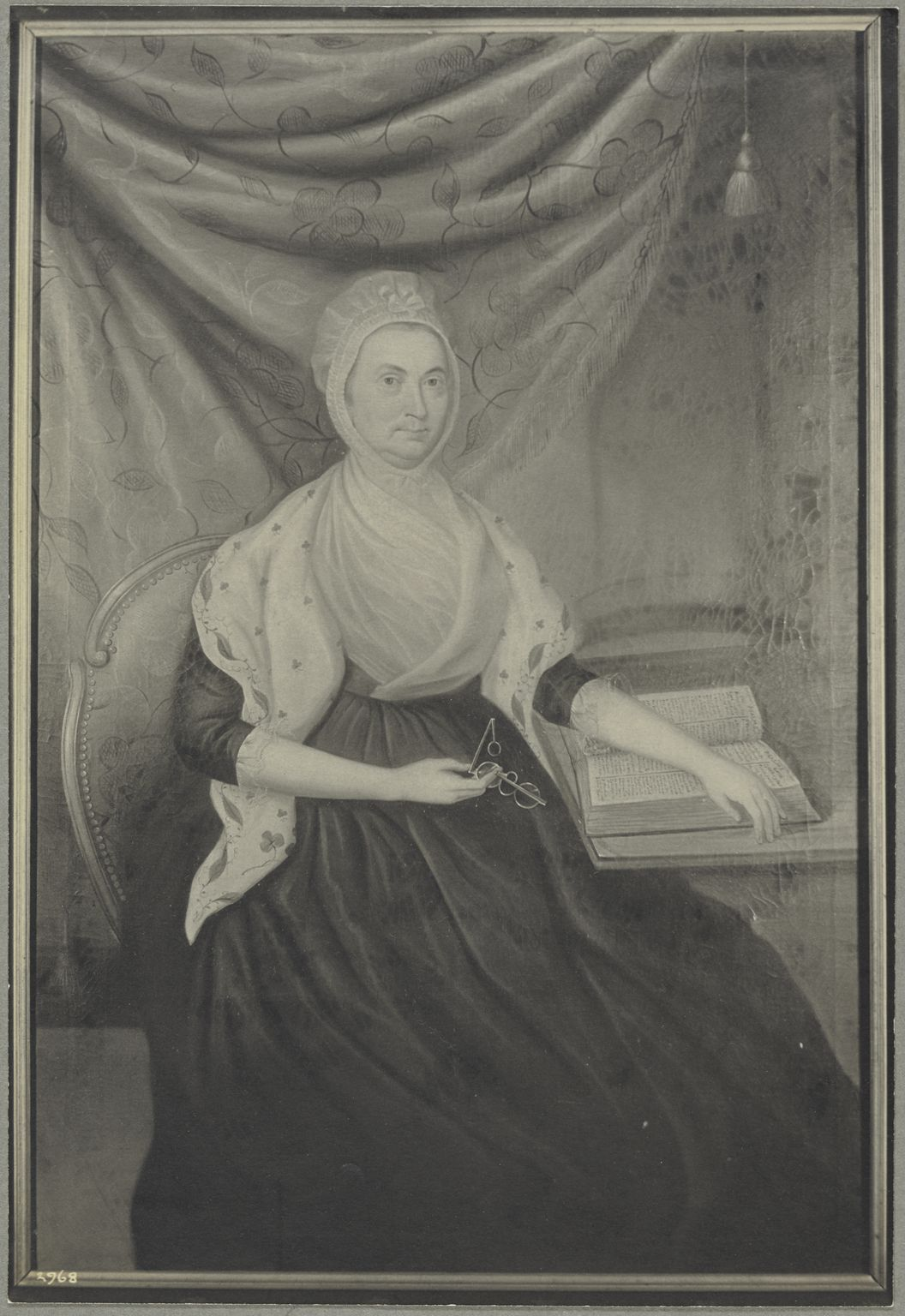
Eleanor Rose "Nelly" Conway

Madison married Eleanor Rose "Nelly" Conway (Port Conway, King George, Virginia), Virginia, January 9, 1731 – Montpelier, Orange County, Virginia, February 11, 1829), also of the planter class (her birthplace was named after her family). They had twelve children:

- James Madison (March 16, 1751 – June 28, 1836)
- Francis Madison (June 18, 1753 – April 5, 1800)
- Ambrose Madison (January 27, 1755 – October 3, 1793); married Mary Willis Lee (27 May 1755 – 14 March 1798), daughter of Hancock Lee II & Mary Willis
- Catlett Madison (February 10, 1758 – March 18, 1758)
- Eleanor Conway Madison (February 14, 1760 – December 24, 1802)
- William Madison (May 5, 1762 – July 20, 1843)
- Sarah Catlett Madison (August 17, 1764 – October 17, 1843)
- unnamed son (1766–1766), died one day after birth
- Elizabeth Madison (February 6, 1768 – May 17, 1775)
- unnamed stillborn son (July 12, 1770 – July 12, 1770)
- Reuben Madison (September 19, 1771 – June 5, 1775)
- Frances Taylor Madison (October 4, 1774 – October 4, 1823)

== American Revolutionary War ==
During the American Revolution, Madison served as chairman of the Orange County Committee of Safety. He was commissioned as a colonel in the Virginia militia.
