= Montpelier (Orange, Virginia) =

Historic house in Virginia, United States

- Montpelier (James Madison House)
- U.S. National Register of Historic Places
- U.S. National Historic Landmark District – Contributing property
- Virginia Landmarks Register
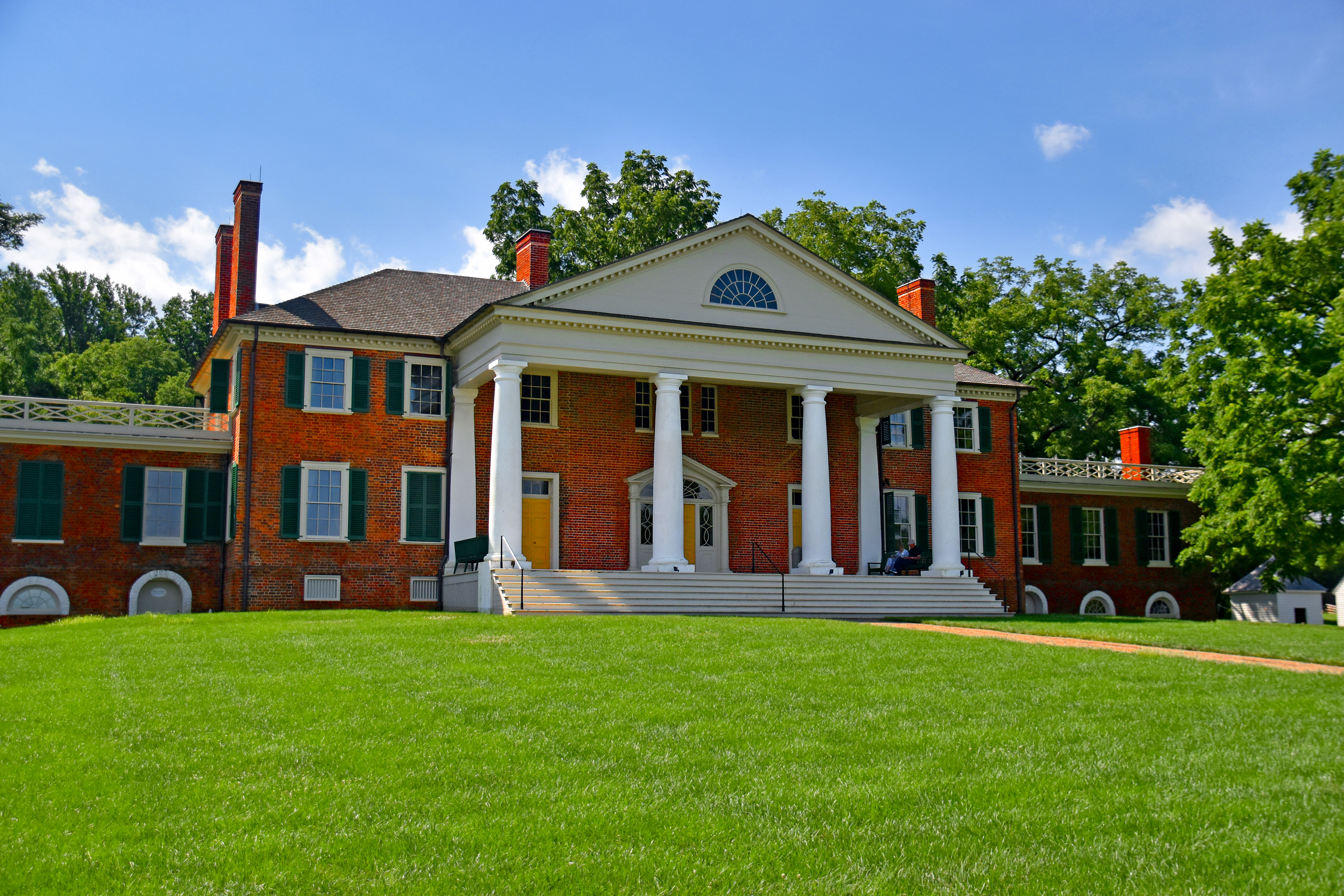
- Interactive map showing Montpelier's location
- Location: Orange County, Virginia
- Nearest city: Orange, Virginia
- Coordinates: 38°13′11″N 78°10′10″W
- Area: 2,650 acres (1,070 ha)
- Built: c. 1764
- Website: montpelier.org
- NRHP reference No.: 66000843
- VLR No.: 068-0030

Significant dates
- Added to NRHP: October 15, 1966
- Designated NHLDCP: December 19, 1960
- Designated VLR: September 9, 1969

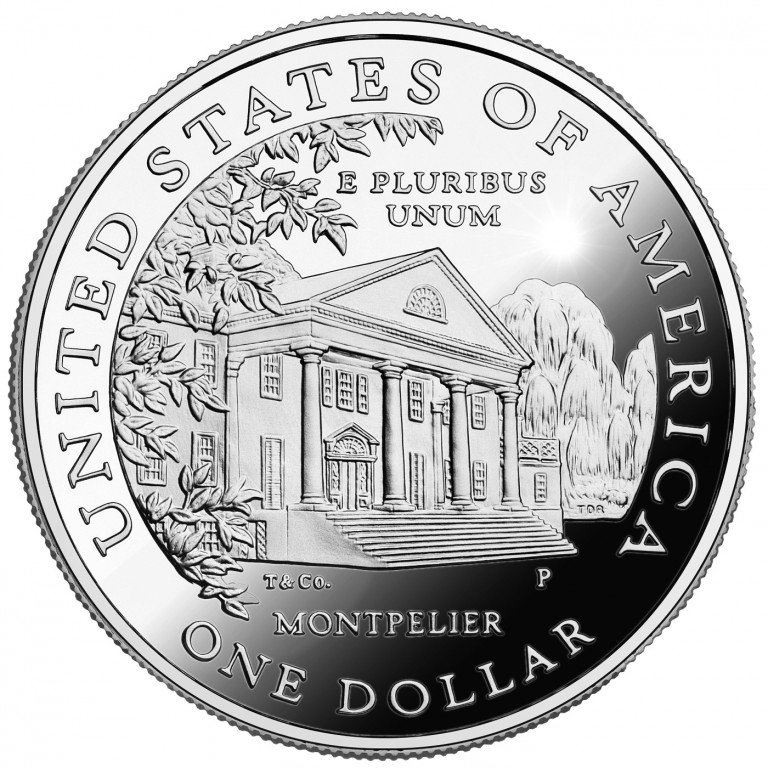
Montpelier is featured on the reverse of the 1999 Dolley Madison silver dollar.

James Madison's Montpelier, located in Orange County, Virginia, was the plantation house of the Madison family, including Founding Father and fourth president of the United States James Madison and his wife, Dolley. The 2,650-acre (1,070 ha) property is open seven days a week.

Montpelier was declared a National Historic Landmark and listed on the National Register of Historic Places in 1966. It was included in the Madison-Barbour Rural Historic District in 1991. In 1983, the last private owner of Montpelier, Marion duPont Scott, bequeathed the estate to the National Trust for Historic Preservation.

The National Trust for Historic Preservation (NTHP) has owned and operated the estate since 1984. In 2000, The Montpelier Foundation formed with the goal of transforming James Madison's historic estate into a dynamic cultural institution. From 2003 to 2008 the NTHP carried out a major restoration, in part to return the mansion to its original size of 22 rooms as it was during the years when it was occupied by James and Dolley Madison. Extensive interior and exterior work was done during the restoration.

Archeological investigations in the 21st century revealed new information about African-American life at the plantation, and a gift from philanthropist David Rubenstein enabled the National Trust to restore the slave quarters in the South Yard and open a slavery exhibition, The Mere Distinction of Colour, in 2017. In June 2021, the Montpelier Foundation approved bylaws to share in governance of the estate with the Montpelier Descendants Committee, composed of descendants of those enslaved at the estate. After some controversy, the Montpelier Descendants Committee achieved parity within the Foundation, holding 14 of 25 seats on the board as of May 2022, including the chair.

== History ==
=== The family of Madison ===
In 1723, James Madison's grandfather, Ambrose Madison, and his brother-in-law, Thomas Chew, received a patent for 4,675 acres (1,892 ha) of land in the Piedmont of Virginia. Ambrose, his wife Frances Madison, and their three children moved to the plantation in 1732, naming it Mount Pleasant. (Archaeologists have located this first site near the Madison Family Cemetery.) Ambrose died six months later; according to court records, he was poisoned by three enslaved Africans. At the time, Ambrose Madison held 29 slaves and close to 4,000 acres (1,600 ha). After his death, Frances managed the estate with the help of their son, Colonel James Madison Sr.

Madison Sr. expanded the plantation to include building services and blacksmithing in the 1740s, and bought additional slaves to cultivate tobacco and other crops. He married Nelly Conway Madison (1731–1829) and had 12 children.

James Madison Sr.'s first-born son, also named James, was born on March 16, 1751, at Belle Grove, his mother's family estate in Port Conway, where she had returned for his birth. James Madison spent his early years at Mount Pleasant.

In the early 1760s, Madison Sr. built a new house half a mile away, which structure forms the heart of the main house at Montpelier today. Built around 1764, it has two stories of brick laid in a Flemish bond pattern, and a low, hipped roof with chimney stacks at both ends. His son James Madison later stated that he remembered helping move furniture to the new home. The building of Montpelier represents Phase 1 (1764–1797) of the construction. Upon completion, the Madisons owned one of the largest brick dwellings in Orange County.

Phase 2 (1797–1800) of construction began in 1797, after son James returned to Montpelier with his new wife Dolley Madison. He was then 39 and she was a young widow with a child. At this time Madison added a thirty-foot extension and a Tuscan portico to the house. Madison's widowed mother, Nelly, still resided in the house following the death of her husband, James Sr., in 1801.

In the last period of construction, Phase 3 (1809–1812), Madison had a large drawing room added, as well as one-story wings at each end of the house; these provided space for the separate household of the newlyweds James and Dolley Madison. After his second term as president, in 1817 Madison retired there full-time with his wife Dolley.

James Madison died in 1836 and is buried in the family cemetery at Montpelier. His widow Dolley Madison moved back to Washington, D.C., in 1837 after his death. In 1844 she sold the plantation to Henry W. Moncure. After Dolley Madison died in 1849, she was buried in Washington, D.C., and later re-interred at Montpelier near her husband James.

After Dolley Madison sold the estate to Henry W. Moncure in 1844, the property was held by six successive owners before the du Ponts bought Montpelier in 1901. The various owners and the dates associated with the site include: Benjamin Thornton (1848–1854), William H. Macfarland (1854–1855), Alfred V. Scott (1855–1857), Thomas J. Carson and Frank Carson (1857–1881), Louis F. Detrick and William L. Bradley (1881–1900) and Charles King Lennig (1900).

=== The name Montpelier ===
The origins of the name Montpelier are uncertain, but the first recorded use of the name comes from a 1781 James Madison letter. Madison personally liked the French spelling of the name Montpellier. The city of Montpellier, France, was a famous resort. Clues from letters and visitor descriptions suggest these origins of the plantation's name.

=== Slavery at Montpelier ===
The work of Montpelier was done primarily by its about 100 enslaved African people during James Madison's tenure as owner. Slaves served in a variety of roles: field workers, domestic servants in charge of cleaning, cooking, and care of clothing; and as artisans for the mill, forge, wheelwright, and other carpentry and woodworking. During the time that the Madisons owned the estate, "five, six, and possibly seven generations of African Americans were born into slavery at Montpelier."

The most well-known slave from Montpelier was Paul Jennings (1799-1874), Madison's body servant from 1817 to 1835. When Jennings went to the White House at age 10, he served at table and did other work. Senator Daniel Webster purchased Jennings from the widowed Dolley Madison in 1845, and gave him his freedom. Jennings continued to live in Washington, DC, where he worked as a laborer at the federal Pension Bureau and became a homeowner.

In 1848, Jennings helped plan the largest slave escape in United States history, as 77 slaves from the Washington, DC area took to The Pearl, a schooner, intending to sail up the Chesapeake Bay to a free state. They were captured and most were sold to the Deep South. Jennings was noted for his reminiscences of Madison, A Colored Man's Reminiscences of James Madison (1865), which is considered the first White House memoir.

Archaeological research and documentary analysis has revealed much about the life of Montpelier-born slave, Catherine Taylor (ca. 1820 – after 1889). Catherine married Ralph Taylor, a house slave, and had four children with him. When Dolley Madison moved to Washington, D.C., in the years after James Madison's death, Ralph was chosen to accompany her to serve her in the capital. Dolley kept Catherine at Montpelier for several months after she brought Ralph to D.C., and then brought Catherine to D.C. later

Dolley Madison transferred (or deeded), most of the enslaved people to her son, John Payne Todd. He stipulated in his will that upon his death, the slaves would be manumitted. However, due to legal and financial complications after Todd's death, the slaves were not manumitted. The Taylors petitioned James C. Maguire, the administrator of the estate, for their freedom. After being officially freed in 1853, they chose to live in Washington, which had a large free black community and opportunities for varied work.

The Montpelier staff continues to research the enslaved community by a variety of methods: studying historical documents such as court records and autobiographies, conducting archaeological excavations, contacting current descendants, and document the contributions and sacrifices of the enslaved community.

=== The duPont family ===
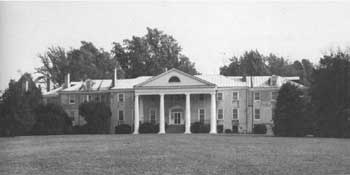
Montpelier in 1975, during Marion duPont Scott's ownership of the property.

After some renovations in the later 19th century (c. 1855 and c. 1880), the house was acquired in 1901 by William and Annie Rogers duPont, of the duPont family. A horse enthusiast, William duPont built barns, stables, and other buildings for equestrian use. The duPonts were among several wealthy families in the Upper South who were influential in the development of Thoroughbred horse racing in the United States. The duPont family also added a Hodgson House to the property. These were known as "America's First Organized Prefabricated House Manufacturer before Aladdin, Sears, and Montgomery Ward", emphasizing that the homes could technically be built in a day. Still located on Montpelier's property, it is now known as the "Bassett House."

William and Annie had a daughter, Marion duPont, and a son William duPont Jr. Upon William duPont Sr.'s death in 1928, William duPont Jr. inherited the family's Bellevue estate in Delaware, whereupon he had the estate's mansion converted into a replica of Montpelier (now preserved as a state park), and Marion inherited the Montpelier estate. Marion preserved much of the core of the Madison home, gardens, and grounds as a legacy for all Americans. After her father's death, Marion made only one change to the house; she remodeled her parents' music room in the latest Art Deco style, using modern and innovative materials such as laminated plywood, chrome, glass block, and plate glass mirrors. A weather vane was installed on the ceiling, which allowed wind direction to direct the hounds for fox hunting. An exact replica of the Art Deco room can be seen in the DuPont Gallery, in the Visitors' Center at Montpelier. Prior to her parents moving into the property, they enlarged the house considerably, adding wings that more than doubled the number of rooms to 55. Her parents also had the brick covered with a stucco exterior for a lighter look.

Hunt Races

In 1934, Marion and her brother William founded the Montpelier Hunt Races, to be held on the grounds. Natural hedges were used as jumps for the steeplechase. The races continue to be held annually, the first Saturday each November.

Marion duPont Scott died in 1983 and bequeathed the property to the National Trust for Historic Preservation, with $10 million (~$26.4 million in 2024) as an endowment to buy and maintain it. Her father's will had stated that if she died childless, the property would go to her brother William duPont Jr. and his children. As he had died in 1965, his five children legally inherited the property. In 1984, the heirs of Marion duPont Scott, in accordance with her wishes, transferred ownership of Montpelier to the National Trust for Historic Preservation.

== National Trust Property ==
Since the National Trust for Historic Preservation took ownership in 1984, the organization has worked to restore Montpelier to the Madison era. It has paid tribute to Marion duPont Scott's influence by retaining one of her favorite rooms in the newly renovated and expanded Visitor Center, along with the annual Montpelier Hunt Races.

In 2000, the National Trust established Montpelier as a co-stewardship property, administered by The Montpelier Foundation.

The Robert H. Smith Center for the Constitution provided an Education Center for students and teachers. It sponsors the "We the People" program to promote the understanding of civics for upper elementary and secondary students, along with national and state programs for teachers, such as the National Advanced Content Seminars, which focuses on historical content and teaching methods.

In conjunction with the James Madison University Field School, Montpelier has been the site of annual, seasonal archeological excavations from April to November. Under a four-year collaborative research grant from the National Endowment for the Humanities, four quarters have been excavated related to the lives of enslaved African Americans: including the Stable Quarter (2009), South and Kitchen Yards (2011), Tobacco Barn Quarter (2012), and Field Quarter (2013). The excavations have revealed early structures in those areas, including possible slave quarters, as well as a variety of artifacts dating to the Madison residency and their slaves. The artifacts are helping researchers form a much broader and deeper picture of the lives of the slaves at Montpelier. "The four residential locations provide a unique opportunity to compare and contrast the conditions of chattel slavery of the period. Differences and similarities between these locations – particularly architectural styles and household goods such as ceramics, glassware, and clothing items – reflect the relationship of individual households to each other, the community to which they belong, their relationship to the overarching plantation complex, and regional patterns of both market access and cultural traditions.

From 2003 to 2008 the National Trust carried out a $25 million restoration to return the mansion to its 1820 state; it is again less than half the size of the expanded residence created by the DuPont family. The National Trust is conducting a search for furnishings either original to the property or of its era.

=== Restoration ===
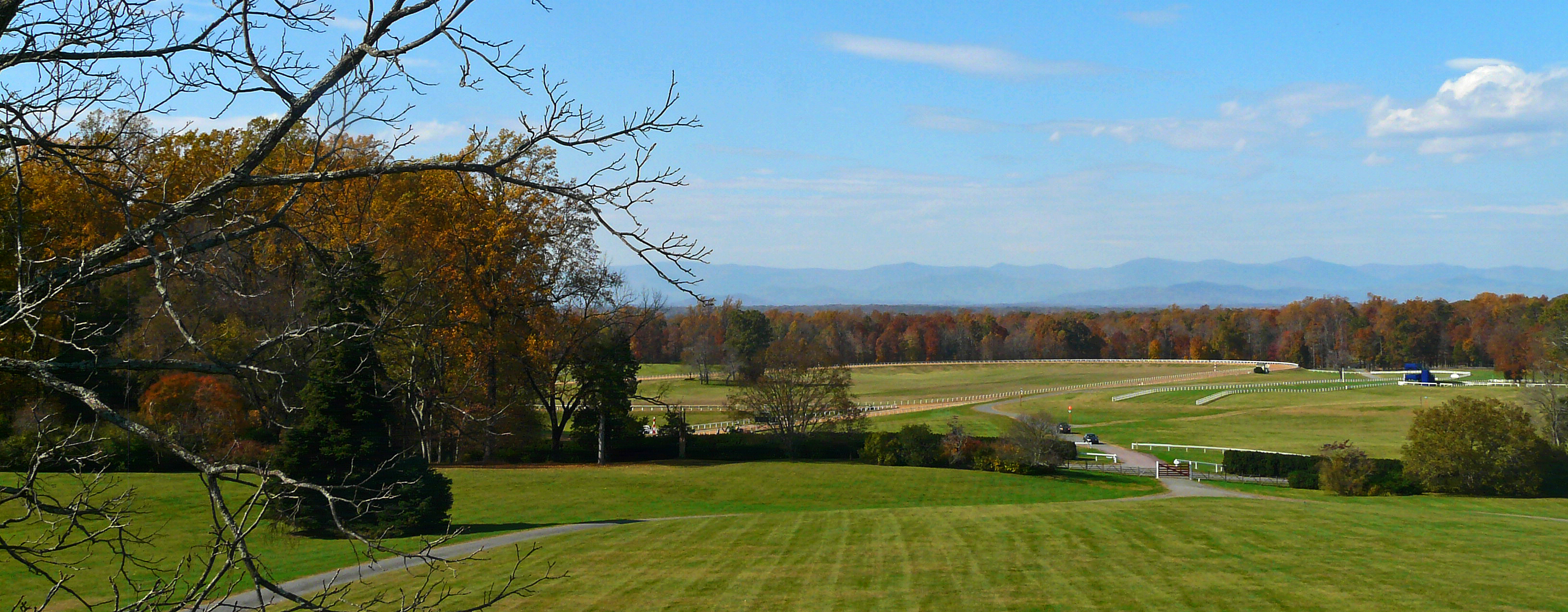
View of the Blue Ridge Mountains from the second floor of the front of James Madison's Montpelier, Orange County, VA.

A $25 million restoration project launched in October 2003 was completed on Constitution Day, September 17, 2008. A Restoration Celebration was held with major funding by National Trust Community Investment Corporation. The restoration returned Montpelier to its 1820 appearance: it demolished additions made to the house by the duPont family, removed the stucco exterior to reveal the original brick, restored the original brick exterior, and reconstructed the house's interior as it appeared during Madison's tenure as owner. Authentic materials were used in the restoration, including horsehair plaster, and paint containing linseed oil and chalk. The Collections staff and archaeologists are working to understand the decorations of each room and recreate room settings as closely as possible to what the Madisons knew.

A wing in the visitors' center has been dedicated to the duPont family. It includes a restored art deco Red Room from the Marion duPont Scott era, moved from the mansion and permanently installed here.

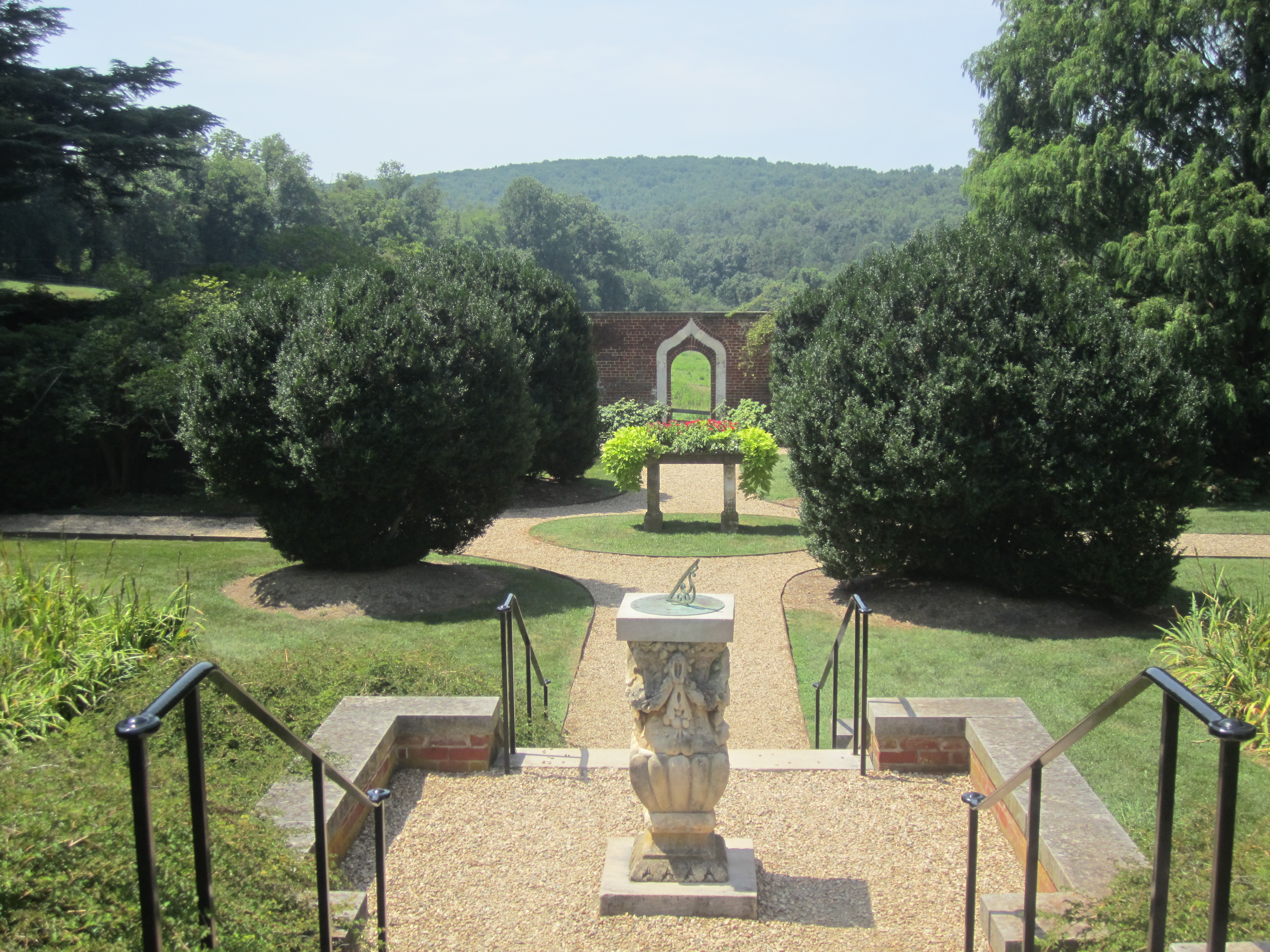
Entrance to the gardens at Montpelier

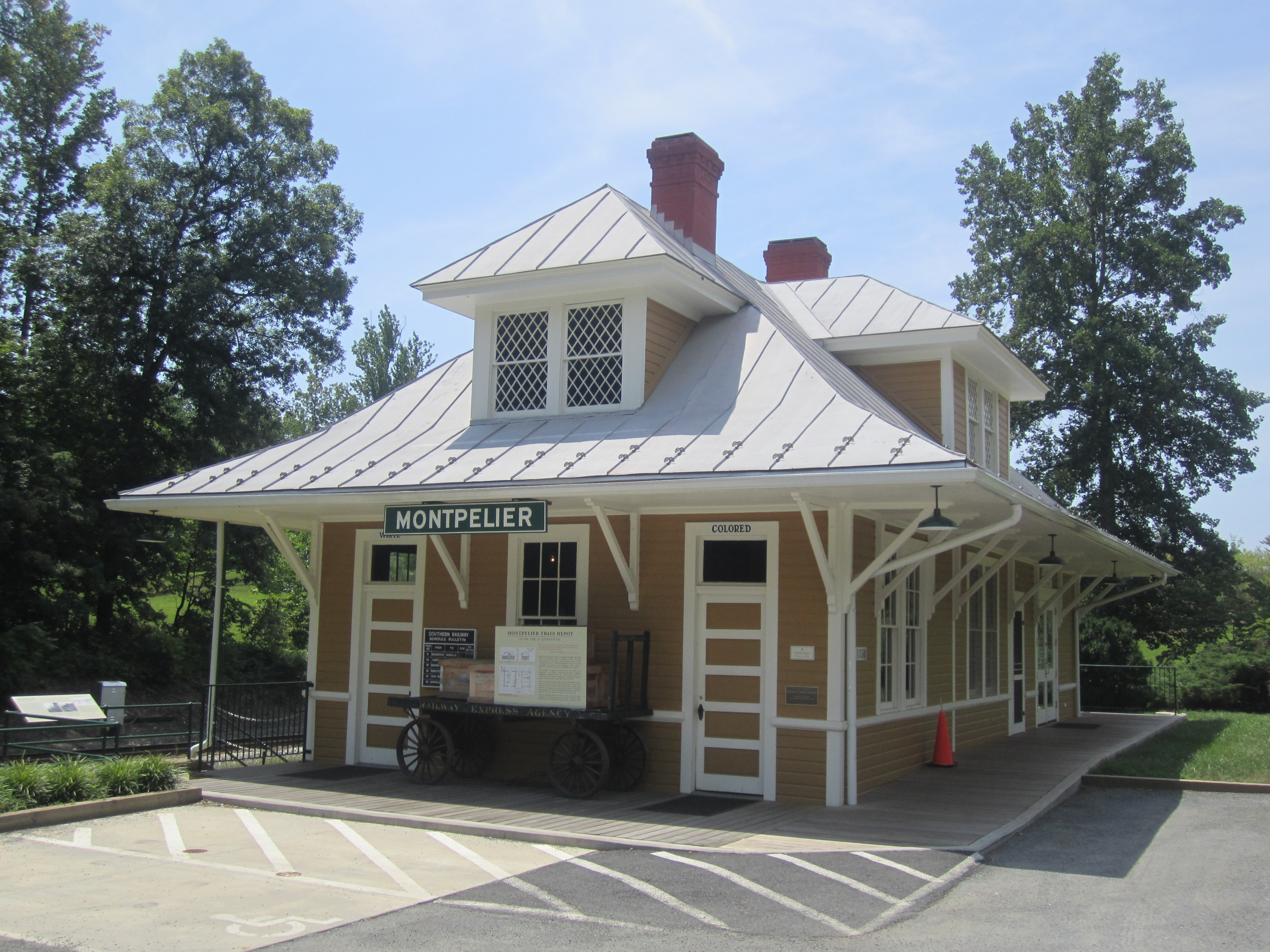
Restored Montpelier train depot is now a civil rights museum

=== The Mere Distinction of Colour ===
In 2017, Montpelier added to its existing interpretations of slavery – including the Gilmore Cabin and the Jim Crow–era Train Station, both of which are permanent installations – with the opening of the exhibition, The Mere Distinction of Colour. This exhibition, funded by a donation from philanthropist David Rubenstein, explores the history and legacies of American slavery both at Montpelier and nationwide. The Mere Distinction of Colour spans the cellars of the Madison house, the south cellar exploring the Montpelier slavery story, and the north cellar analyzing the economics and legacies of slavery. The exhibition is the culmination of decades of archaeological and documentary research conducted by Montpelier staff and advisors.

One of the unique features of this exhibition is that it was guided by living descendants of the slaves who once inhabited Montpelier and the surrounding area. Montpelier has an active descendant community, some of whom have genealogical proof of their ancestry, and others who are connected through oral histories that have been passed down through generations.

The South Cellar details the Montpelier story of slavery, complete with the voices of descendants and the names of everyone known to be enslaved on the property throughout the Madison ownership. The North Cellar analyses the national slave narrative, talking about how slavery become institutionalized in American society and how profitable the slave trade was for all of the colonies, not exclusively the south.

The unguided Mere Distinction of Colour installation is free with the purchase of any tour ticket, and is open to the public Thursday to Monday.

=== Today ===
Montpelier is open to visitors Thursday to Monday except Thanksgiving and Christmas, with the following hours: January – March: 9:00 a.m. to 4:00 p.m, April – October: 9:00 a.m. to 4:00 p.m., November – December: 9:00 a.m. to 4:00 p.m.

Montpelier includes the a Hands-on-Restoration-Tent open from April–October; Hands-on-Archaeology Lab open daily Monday-Friday; Hands-on-Cooking offered April–October; Civil War and Gilmore Farm Trail open daily; and, the Archaeology Dig open April–October.

Visitors can also explore over eight miles of walking trails that wind through horse pastures, wildflower meadows, and forests, including the 197-acre (80 ha) old-growth Montpelier Forest.

== Annual events ==
Montpelier is the site of many annual events. Three particularly draw large crowds: the Montpelier Hunt Races, Wine Festival, and the Fiber Festival.

The annual Montpelier Hunt Races, an autumn steeplechase event, were started by Marion duPont Scott and her brother William duPont Jr. in 1934. The races are held the first Saturday in November. Montpelier has one of the few steeplechase tracks in the country that use traditional hedgerows for jumps. Montpelier hosts seven races at this event. Guests may watch the races directly at the rail for a close experience.

The Montpelier Wine Festival showcases distinctive arts and crafts, specialty food vendors, local agricultural products, and Virginia wine from approximately 25 different wineries in the state.

The Fall Fiber Festival is held each October and is a popular regional event. The event showcases every aspect of textile manufacturing, from the production of wool to the finished product. Events include sheep shearing, craft demos, and a host of other activities. The most popular feature of the Fall Fiber Festival is the Sheep Dog Trials.

Other events include: summer programs for children, such as the "Mud Camp," a barbecue held in the summer with local barbecue cuisine, Archaeology Expeditions, civil war demonstrations, and, in December, a candlelight tour of Montpelier in the evening.

== Montpelier Forest ==
A 197-acre (80 ha) forest on the property known as the Montpelier Forest (also known as the Landmark Forest) was designated as a National Natural Landmark by the National Park Service in 1987. The forest was recognized as being one of the best examples of a mature Piedmont forest dominated by tulip poplar and spicebush; various species of oak and hickory are also common in the forest. The relatively undisturbed forest contains several trees up to 300 years old. Ideal growing conditions at the site, including fertile soils, allow for the trees to attain great size; tulip poplars attain heights of up to 120 feet (37 m) by the time they reach 50 years of age, and some trees have been measured to have diameters of up to five feet (60 in; 150 cm).

== In literature ==
This property is the subject of Lydia Sigourney's poem "Montpelier", published in her Scenes in my Native Land, 1845, with accompanying descriptive text.

== See also ==
- List of National Historic Landmarks in Virginia
- List of National Natural Landmarks in Virginia
- List of residences of presidents of the United States
- List of burial places of presidents and vice presidents of the United States
- National Register of Historic Places listings in Orange County, Virginia
- Presidential memorials in the United States
