= Piper Madison =

American singer-songwriter, multi-instrumentalist and actress

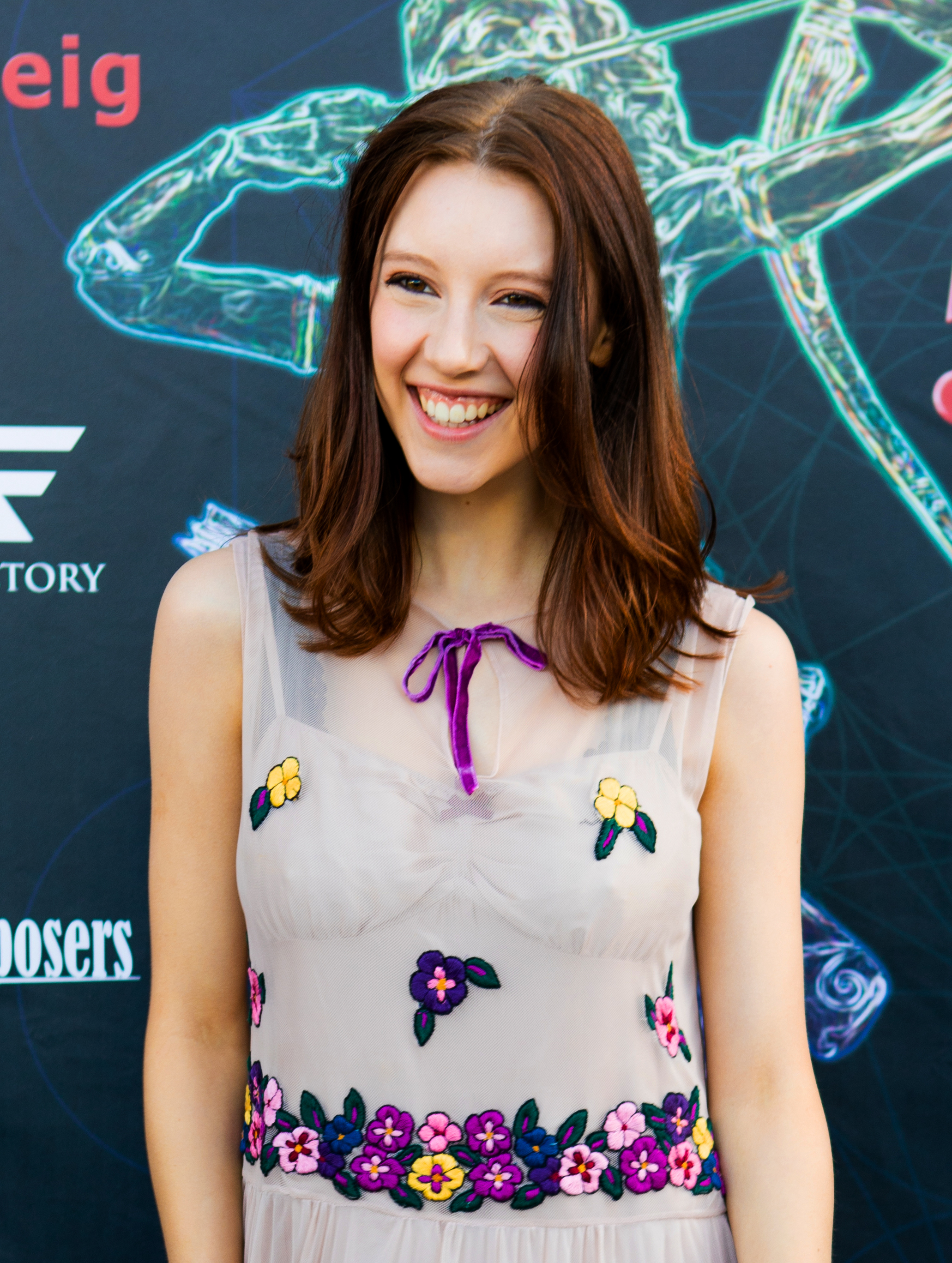
- Piper Madison in 2019

Background information
- Born: March 10, 2002 (age 24); Louisville, Kentucky, United States
- Genres: Rock; pop
- Occupations: Singer-songwriter; multi-instrumentalist; actress
- Instruments: Vocals; piano; banjo; guitar
- Years active: 2002–present
- Label: Bug on the Camel
- Website: pipermadison.com

Piper Madison (born March 10, 2002) is an American Billboard top 40 recording artist and songwriter, multi-instrumentalist and actress.

== Television ==
Madison appeared as Zelphaba in the Nickelodeon television series 100 Things to Do Before High School and won a Young Artist Award for her role in 2016.

== Discography ==
On July 1, 2019, Madison released her debut album, Who's Running Your Mind. Her single "Little Bit of Rain", remixed by Chris Cox and Jared Lee Gosselin, debuted on the Billboard Dance Club Songs at No. 46 on September 14, 2019, and reached its peak at No. 14 on October 26, 2019. Madison performed at SXSW music festival in 2019. Madison released her holiday EP, Snowfall, on November 15, 2019.

=== Albums ===
| Year | Album details | Tracks | Peak chart positions | | | |
| Year | Album details | Tracks | US | US Rock | US Heat | US Digital |
|---|---|---|---|---|---|---|
| 2019 | Who's Running Your Mind?: Released: July 1, 2019; Label: Bug On The Camel; Formats: CD, digital download, Vinyl; Produced by Patrick Keesee | No. / Title / Length; 1. / ""Little Bit of Rain"" / 4:19; 2. / ""Take Your Time"" / 4:19; 3. / ""No Hard Feelings"" / 2:57; 4. / ""Suicide Angel"" / 4:34; 5. / ""Love (What an Angry Word)"" / 4:56; 6. / ""Give Me a Break (Interlude)"" / 2:10; 7. / ""Welcome Back, Mr. Jimmy"" / 2:49; 8. / ""Good Gone Bad"" / 3:34; 9. / ""I Used to Care"" / 3:30; 10. / ""I Miss You"" / 3:54; 11. / ""Phonograph"" / 2:39; Total length: / / 39:41 | — | — | — | — |
| 2019 | Snowfall: Released: November 15, 2019; Label: Bug On The Camel; Formats: CD, digital download; Produced by Patrick Keesee | No. / Title / Length; 1. / ""River"" / 4:05; 2. / ""Below 32"" / 3:24; 3. / ""December Love"" / 4:27; Total length: / / 11:56 | — | — | — | — |
"—" denotes releases that did not chart

=== Singles ===
| Year | Single | Peak chart positions | | | | Album |
| Year | Single | US | US Adult Pop | US AAA | US Dance | Album |
|---|---|---|---|---|---|---|
| 2018 | "Pumpkin Pie" | — | — | — | — | |
| 2018 | "Shots Fired" | — | — | — | — | |
| 2019 | "I Used to Care" | — | — | — | — | Who's Running Your Mind? |
| 2019 | "Little Bit of Rain" | — | — | — | 14 | Who's Running Your Mind? |
"—" denotes releases that did not chart
