= William Madison =

American military officer

- Born: May 5, 1762; King George, Virginia, British America
- Died: July 20, 1843 (aged 81); Woodberry Forest, Virginia, U.S.
- Military career
- Rank: Lieutenant general
- Conflicts: American Revolutionary War; War of 1812

William Madison (May 5, 1762 – July 20, 1843) was an American general. He attended Hampden–Sydney College and served in the American Revolutionary War and War of 1812. A son of James Madison Sr. and Eleanor Rose Conway, he was the younger brother of James Madison, the fourth president of the United States. Madison married Frances Throckmorton and had eleven children. He was the grandfather of Confederate brigadier general James E. Slaughter.
