= Martin Madison =

American politician

Martin Madison (born in Winnebago County, Wisconsin in 1854) was an American politician. He was a member of the South Dakota House of Representatives from 1903 to 1906. He was a Republican.
