= Ambrose Madison =

American planter and politician (1696–1732); grandfather of James Madison

- Born: January 17, 1696; Orange County, Colony of Virginia
- Died: August 27, 1732 (aged 36); Orange County, Colony of Virginia
- Cause of death: Murder by poison
- Occupations: Planter and politician
- Spouse: Frances Taylor (m. 1721–1732; his death)
- Children: James Madison Sr.
- Parent(s): John Madison; Isabella Avarilla Minor Todd
- Relatives: Lt. Col. John Madison Sr. (grandfather)

Ambrose Madison (January 17, 1696 – August 27, 1732) was an American planter and politician in the Piedmont of Virginia Colony. He married Frances Taylor in 1721, daughter of James Taylor, a member of the Knights of the Golden Horseshoe Expedition across the Blue Ridge Mountains from the Tidewater. Through her father, Madison and his brother-in-law Thomas Chew were aided in acquiring 4,675 acres in 1723, in what became Orange County. There he developed his tobacco plantation known as Mount Pleasant (and later as Montpelier.) The Madisons were parents of James Madison Sr. and paternal grandparents of President James Madison.

After Madison died of a short illness in August 1732, three slaves were convicted of poisoning him, and one was executed for the crime. It was the first time in Virginia that slaves were convicted of killing a planter.

== Early life and education ==
Ambrose Madison was born in 1696 in Virginia, He was the son of sheriff, planter, politician and major landowner John Madison and Isabella Minor Todd. He was tutored and trained by his father to be a planter. He had an older sister, Elizabeth Ann Madison born in 1687. She was married to George Penn, the great-uncle of Admiral Sir William Penn. Madison's great-grandfather Isaac Madison was born in London in 1590 to John Isaac Madison of Aycliffe and Rebecca St. Leger Horsmanden of Lenham, and had moved to Jamestown in 1608, a year after its founding.

== Marriage and family ==
In 1721, Madison married Frances Taylor, daughter of James Taylor and aunt of Richard Taylor, a wealthy and influential man in the colony. As a member of the Knights of the Golden Horseshoe Expedition across the Blue Ridge Mountains, Taylor later acquired 8,000 acres of land in the Piedmont. With his help, in 1723 Madison and his brother-in-law Thomas Chew acquired 4,657 acres of land in present-day Orange County, Virginia, where planters from the Tidewater were moving for new land to support tobacco cultivation.

== Development of Mount Pleasant and murder ==
Frances and Ambrose Madison's share of land was the basis of their plantation, which they called Mount Pleasant (later to be known as Montpelier (Orange, Virginia). To clear the land to secure title, Madison bought 29 African slaves, likely Igbo, who worked under white overseers for five years before the Madisons moved to the property. The Madison family moved to the plantation in 1732 after a house had been built and tobacco cultivation had started. They had several children, and their oldest son was James Madison Sr., the future father of U.S. President James Madison.

Ambrose Madison died that summer at age 36 after a short illness, on August 27, 1732. The family or the sheriff believed he was poisoned by slaves, and three were charged in the case. As the historian Douglas B. Chambers notes in his 2005 book on the Igbo in Virginia, historic evidence was severely limited. There is no way for historians to assess what the charges were based on, and if they arose more out of planter fears of slaves than slave actions.

According to the brief court records, three African slaves were charged and convicted by the justices of the Commission of Peace of poisoning the planter. The justices apparently believed Dido and Turk, owned by the widow Frances Taylor Madison, had lesser roles and, after punishing them by whipping, returned the slaves to her for continued labor. Pompey, owned by a neighboring planter, was believed the ringleader and was executed. As Chambers notes, they were the first slaves convicted in Virginia of a planter's murder.

Unusually, the widow Frances Taylor Madison never remarried; the tobacco plantation yielded revenue and she may have received support from her extensive Taylor family, who were also in Orange County. Her eldest son James Madison, Sr. inherited the plantation when he came of age at 21 in 1744. By the 1750s, the Madison plantation was referred to as "Home House." During his tenure, Madison acquired more land, so that he eventually owned 5,000 acres.

By 1780, James Madison, Jr., had become steward of Home House and called it Montpelier. It became famous after he was elected to two terms as president.
