= Benjamin Greenleaf =

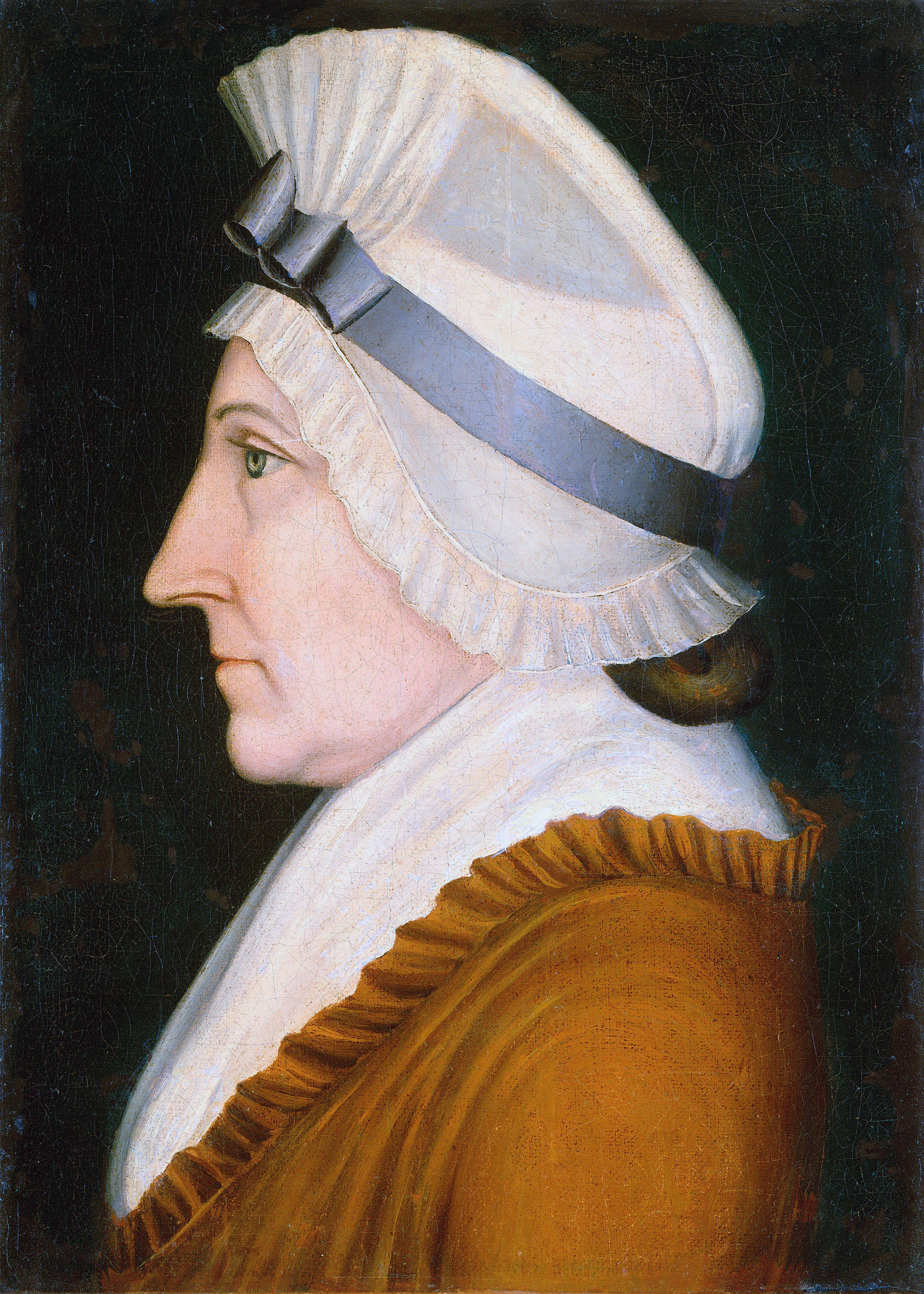
Lady in a White Mob Cap, c. 1805, oil on canvas, in the collection of the National Gallery of Art

Benjamin Greenleaf (January 13, 1769 - January 10, 1821) was an American portraitist, active throughout New England during his career.

Greenleaf was born in Hull, Massachusetts, son of Mary and John Greenleaf; long identified with the educator of the same name, he was established as a different individual in 1981. On November 20, 1799, he married Abigail Greenleaf Rhoades (sometimes given as Rhodes) of Dorchester in that state. Four years later he produced his earliest known portrait, that of his great-uncle Jacob Goold, a resident of Weymouth. This work is in oil on canvas mounted on board, the medium in which his earliest paintings were created. He was active at least until 1818, and is known to have traveled extensively throughout New England, particularly the vicinity of Boston; he is also traced in New Hampshire, in the communities of Hanover and Hopkinton, and in the Maine towns of Bath, Phippsburg, Paris, and Portland. A diary entry from Samuel Adams of Bath, dated 1816, suggests that he might have received lodging in at least partial exchange for his painting, and he is known to have been active there the following year as well. Little is known about his business transactions; his career has been documented mainly using the paper labels affixed to the backs of his portraits. Greenleaf died of apoplexy in Weymouth in 1821.

Besides oil on canvas, Greenleaf favored the technique of reverse glass painting, and the majority of his fifty-six documented works are in this medium. Frequently he depicted his sitters in profile, but occasionally he used three-quarter view in his works. Many of his subjects were related through marriage or otherwise acquainted, and he appears to have worked mainly within a small circle. Two portraits, one each on canvas and on glass, are owned by the National Gallery of Art. A pair of portraits attributed to him are held by the American Folk Art Museum. An 1820 likeness of Joseph Wiggins is in the collection of the Minneapolis Institute of Arts. The Boston Medical Library owns a portrait of Cotton Tufts. A self-portrait is also recorded, in a private collection.
