= Charles Peale Polk =

American painter

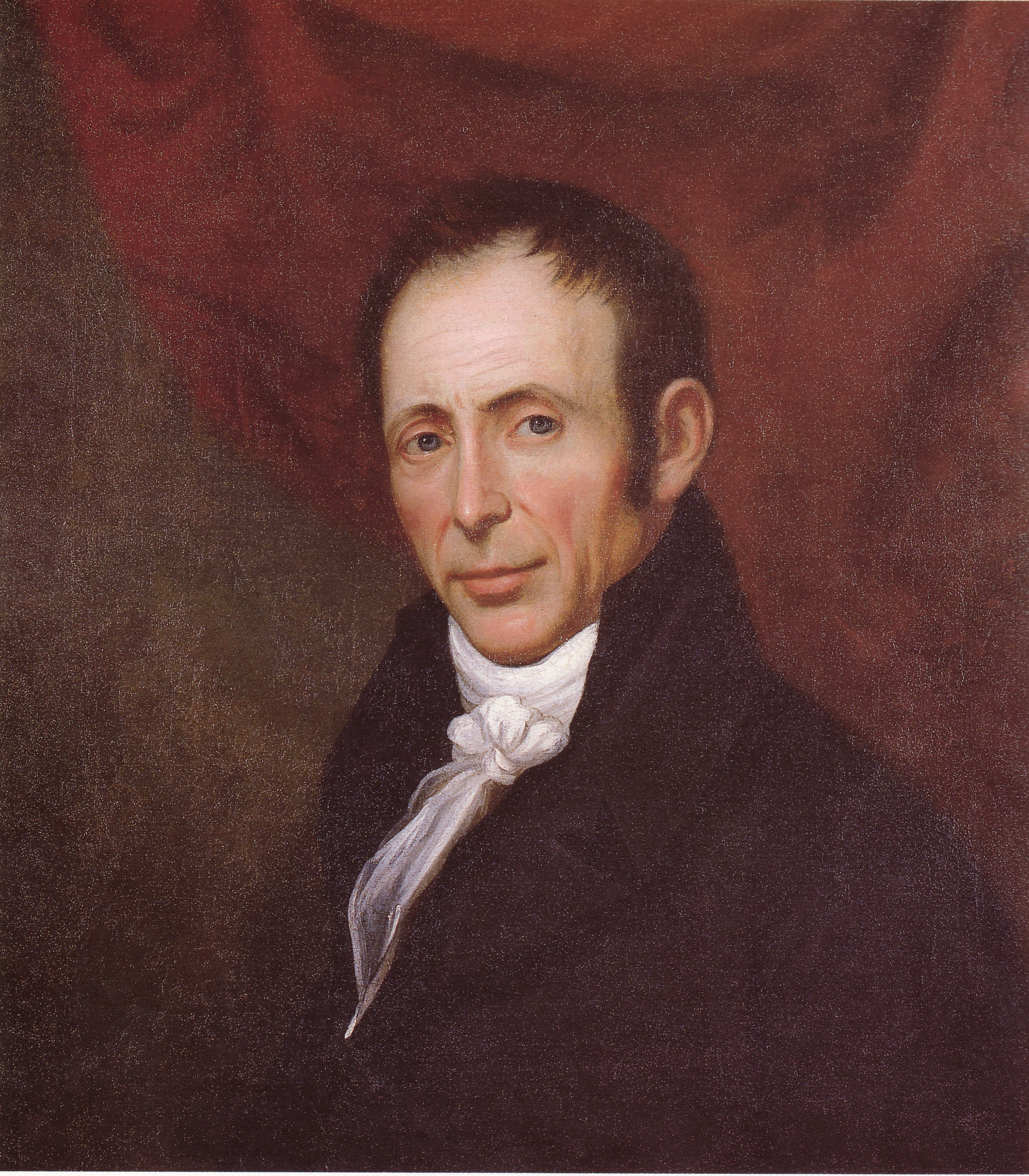
Polk's Self-Portrait, c. 1816–1820, currently housed in the Virginia Historical Society in Richmond, Virginia

Charles Peale Polk (March 17, 1767 – May 6, 1822) was an American portrait painter and the nephew of artist Charles Willson Peale.

== Biography ==
Polk was born in Annapolis, Maryland, to Elizabeth Digby Peale and Robert Polk. At age eight or ten (sources vary), after being orphaned, he was sent to Philadelphia to live with his uncle and study art.

He was married by the time he was eighteen, and Philadelphia was his permanent residence.

By the time he was in his twenties, Polk was advertising himself as a portrait artist in Baltimore newspapers. He was apparently not at successful since he returned to Philadelphia within a few years, advertising his services as a house and sign painter. He continued his artistic pursuits, and by 1800 he had opened exhibitions in Baltimore. In 1800, he held government office in Washington, D.C. at the National Gallery of Art.

== Career as an artist ==
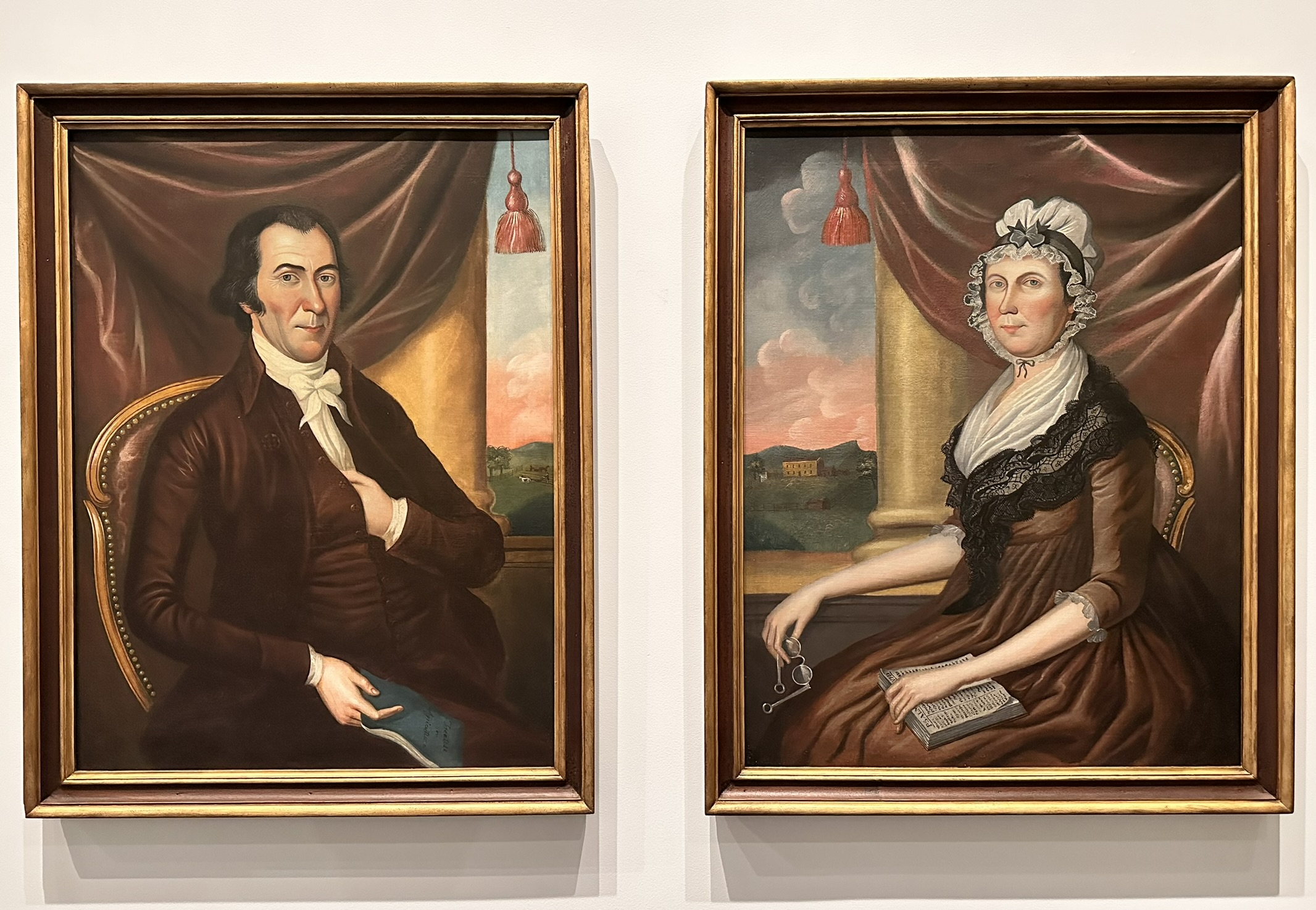
Polk's 1799 portraits of Colonel Gerard Briscoe and his wife, Margaret, displayed in the Museum of the Shenandoah Valley

Polk’s earliest paintings were copies of his uncle's originals, and he was highly dependent on his uncle's training and guidance. He continued to make copies of many paintings, including his own. It is said that he produced fifty-seven reproductions of his George Washington portrait. He was commissioned to do thirty-five paintings, which was his largest group of works from any period.

He eventually opened a drawing school and a dry-goods business. Both ventures failed, and he moved to Frederick County, Maryland. During his period as a politician, he produced few oil paintings. However, he did produce "verre églomisé" miniatures, which were made by scratching a gold leaf profile into a glass plate and painting black in the surrounding areas. Ultimately, he took up life as a farmer in Virginia two years before his death.
