= List of ship commissionings in 1907 =

The list of ship commissionings in 1907 includes a chronological list of all ships commissioned in 1907.

Date	Operator	Ship	Flag	Class and type	Pennant	Other notes
2 January	Royal Navy	Hibernia'		King Edward VII-class battleship		
12 January	French Navy	République		République-class battleship		
4 March	United States Navy	Vermont		Connecticut-class battleship	BB-20	
9 March	United States Navy	Minnesota		Connecticut-class battleship	BB-22	
3 April	Swedish Navy	Oscar II		Coastal defence ship		
6 April	Imperial German Navy	Königsberg		Königsberg-class cruiser		
18 April	United States Navy	Kansas		Connecticut-class battleship	BB-21	
1 July	United States Navy	Nebraska		Virginia-class battleship	BB-14	
1 July	French Navy	Patrie		République-class battleship		
6 August	Imperial German Navy	Pommern		Deutschland-class battleship		
1 October	Imperial German Navy	Hannover		Deutschland-class battleship		
24 October	Imperial German Navy	Scharnhorst		Scharnhorst-class cruiser		
29 October	Imperial German Navy	Stettin		Königsberg-class cruiser		
1 December	Imperial German Navy	Danzig		Bremen-class cruiser		
