= USS New Hampshire =

USS New Hampshire may refer to one of a number of United States Navy ships named in honor of the state of New Hampshire:

- USS New Hampshire (1864) was authorized as the USS Alabama in 1816, one of a group of nine ships of the line, but not launched until 1864 as a storeship and destroyed by fire in 1921
- USS New Hampshire (BB-25) was a Connecticut-class battleship commissioned in 1908 and sold for scrapping in 1923
- USS New Hampshire (BB-70) was a Montana-class battleship authorized in 1940 but cancelled in 1943 before her keel was laid
- USS New Hampshire (SSN-778) is a Virginia-class nuclear-powered attack submarine, commissioned in 2008 and currently in active service
