= USS Louisiana (BB-19) =

Pre-dreadnought battleship of the United States Navy

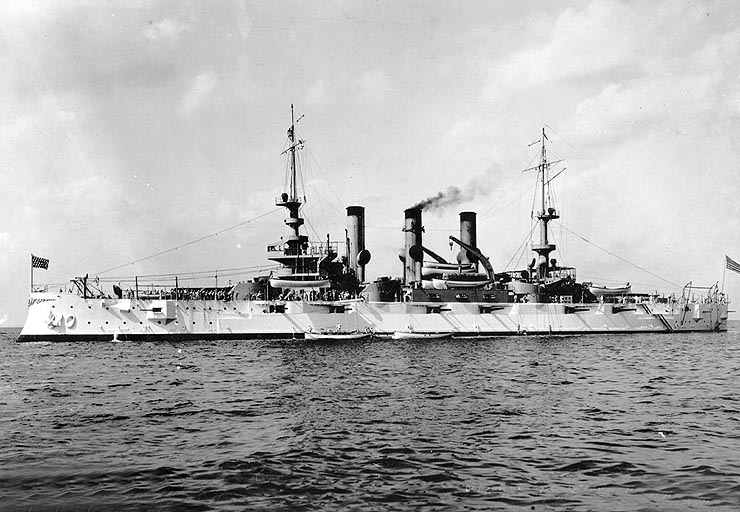
- Louisiana

History

United States
- Name: Louisiana
- Namesake: Louisiana
- Builder: Newport News Shipbuilding Company
- Laid down: 7 February 1903
- Launched: 27 August 1904
- Commissioned: 2 June 1906
- Decommissioned: 20 October 1920
- Stricken: 10 November 1923
- Fate: Sold 1 November 1923 and broken up for scrap.

General characteristics
- Class & type: Connecticut-class battleship
- Displacement: Normal: 16,000 long tons (16,000 t); Full load: 17,666 long tons (17,949 t)
- Length: 456 ft 4 in (139.09 m)
- Beam: 76 ft 10 in (23.42 m)
- Draft: 24 ft 6 in (7.47 m)
- Installed power: 12 Babcock & Wilcox boilers; 16,500 ihp (12,300 kW)
- Propulsion: 2 × triple-expansion steam engines; 2 × screw propellers
- Speed: 18 kn (21 mph; 33 km/h)
- Complement: 827 officers and men
- Armament: 4 × 12 in (305 mm)/45 caliber Mark 5 guns; 8 × 8 in (203 mm)/45 caliber guns; 12 × 7 in (178 mm)/45 caliber guns; 20 × 3 in (76 mm)/50 caliber guns; 12 × 3-pounder guns; 4 × 1-pounder guns; 4 × 21 inch (533 mm) torpedo tubes
- Armor: Belt: 6–11 in (152–279 mm); Barbettes: 6–10 in (152–254 mm); Turret Main: 8–12 in (203–305 mm); Turret secondary: 7 in (178 mm); Conning tower: 9 in (229 mm)

USS Louisiana (hull number: BB-19) was a Connecticut-class battleship of the United States Navy. She was the second member of the class of six pre-dreadnought battleships, and the third ship to carry her name. Louisiana was laid down in February 1903, launched in August 1904, and commissioned in June 1906. She was a 16,000-long-ton (16,000 t) battleship capable of 19 knots (35 km/h; 22 mph). Her main armament consisted of four 12-inch (305 mm) guns supported by a mixed secondary battery of 7 in (178 mm) and 8 in (203 mm) guns.

Louisiana primarily operated along the east coast of the United States and in the Caribbean during her career. In 1908–1909, she took part in the world cruise of the Great White Fleet. A pair of trips to European waters took place in 1910 and 1911. From 1913, she began to become involved in the Mexican Revolution, as the US Navy began to send ships to protect American interests in the country. This activity culminated in the US occupation of Veracruz in April 1914. During World War I, Louisiana was employed as a training ship before serving as a convoy escort in late 1918. After the war ended that year, she was used to ferry American soldiers back from France. With this work completed, she was decommissioned in October 1920 and broken up for scrap at the Philadelphia Navy Yard in 1923.

== Design ==
The Connecticut class followed the Virginia-class battleships, but corrected some of the most significant deficiencies in the earlier design, most notably the superposed arrangement of the main and some of the secondary guns. A heavier tertiary battery of 7 in (178 mm) guns replaced the 6 in (152 mm) guns that had been used on all previous US designs. Despite the improvements, the ships were rendered obsolescent by the revolutionary British battleship HMS Dreadnought, completed before most of the members of the Connecticut class.

Line-drawing of the Connecticut class

Louisiana was 456.3 ft (139.1 m) long overall and had a beam of 76.9 ft (23.4 m) and a draft of 24.5 ft (7.5 m). She displaced 16,000 long tons (16,260 t) as designed and up to 17,666 long tons (17,949 t) at full load. The ship was powered by two-shaft triple-expansion steam engines rated at 16,500 indicated horsepower (12,300 kW), with steam provided by twelve coal-fired Babcock & Wilcox boilers ducted into three funnels. The propulsion system generated a top speed of 18 knots (33 km/h; 21 mph). As built, she was fitted with heavy military masts, but these were quickly replaced by lattice masts in 1909. She had a crew of 827 officers and enlisted men, though this increased to 881 and later to 896.

The ship was armed with a main battery of four 12 inch /45 Mark 5 (Note: /45 refers to the length of the gun in terms of calibers. A /45 gun is 45 times long as it is in bore diameter.) guns in two twin gun turrets on the centerline, one forward and aft. The secondary battery consisted of eight 8-inch (203 mm) /45 guns and twelve 7-inch (178 mm) /45 guns. The 8-inch guns were mounted in four twin turrets amidships and the 7-inch guns were placed in casemates in the hull. For close-range defense against torpedo boats, she carried twenty 3-inch (76 mm) /50 guns mounted in casemates along the side of the hull and twelve 3-pounder guns. She also carried four 37 mm (1.5 in) 1-pounder guns. As was standard for capital ships of the period, Louisiana carried four 21 inch (533 mm) torpedo tubes, submerged in her hull on the broadside.

Louisiana's main armored belt was 11 in (279 mm) thick over the magazines and the propulsion machinery spaces and 6 in (152 mm) elsewhere. The main battery gun turrets had 12-inch (305 mm) thick faces, and the supporting barbettes had 10 in (254 mm) of armor plating. The secondary turrets had 7 in (178 mm) of frontal armor. The conning tower had 9 in (229 mm) thick sides.

== Service history ==
=== Early career and the Great White Fleet ===
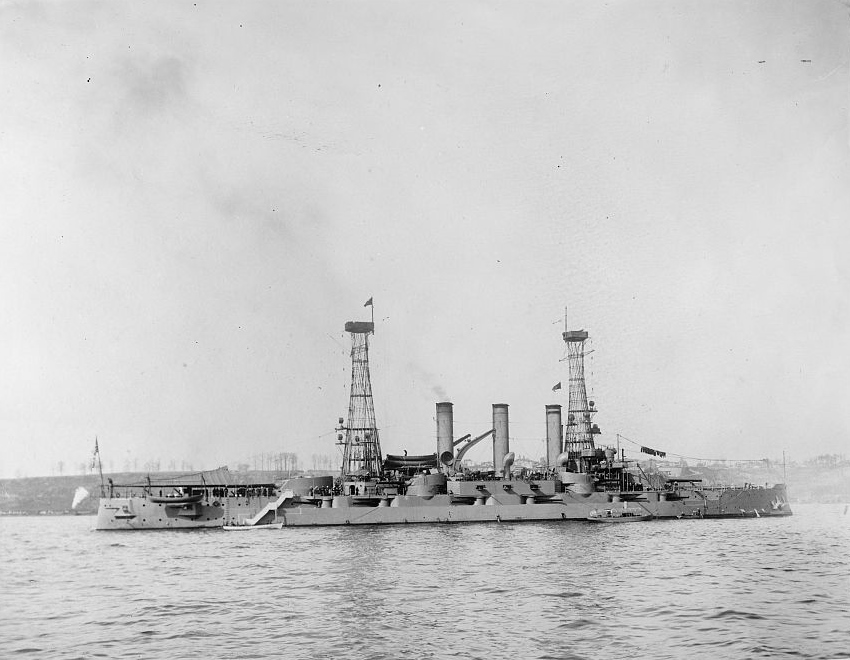
Louisiana in New York City during a Naval Review in 1911

The keel for Louisiana was laid down at the Newport News Shipbuilding & Dry Dock Company in Newport News, Virginia on 7 February 1903. Her completed hull was launched on 27 August 1904, and she was commissioned into the fleet on 2 June 1906. The ship then conducted a shakedown cruise off the coast of New England before being ordered to Cuba. She left the United States on 15 September with Secretary of War William Howard Taft and Assistant Secretary of State Robert Bacon aboard; they were requested as a peace commission by Cuban President Tomás Estrada Palma to suppress an insurrection in the country. Taft and Bacon helped to create a provisional government, during which time Louisiana remained in Cuba. After their work was completed, Taft and Bacon returned to the ship, which took them back to Fortress Monroe, Virginia.

On 8 November, Louisiana carried President Theodore Roosevelt from Piney Point, Maryland to Panama, where the Panama Canal was being built. After inspecting the progress of construction, Roosevelt boarded Louisiana and made a visit to Puerto Rico to examine the new government building there before continuing on to Piney Point, arriving on 26 November. Over the course of the following year, the ship made a series of cruises to American ports, including New Orleans and Norfolk, and visits to Havana and Guantánamo Bay in Cuba. During this period, she also took part in training exercises off New England.

Louisiana joined the Great White Fleet on 16 December 1907, when they departed Hampton Roads to begin their circumnavigation of the globe. The cruise of the Great White Fleet was conceived as a way to demonstrate American military power, particularly to Japan. Tensions had begun to rise between the United States and Japan after the latter's victory in the Russo-Japanese War in 1905, particularly over racist opposition to Japanese immigration to the United States. The press in both countries began to call for war, and Roosevelt hoped to use the demonstration of naval might to deter Japanese aggression. The fleet cruised south to the Caribbean and then to South America, making stops in Port of Spain, Rio de Janeiro, Punta Arenas, and Valparaíso, among other cities. After arriving in Mexico in March 1908, the fleet spent three weeks conducting gunnery practice. The fleet then resumed its voyage up the Pacific coast of the Americas, stopping in San Francisco and Seattle before crossing the Pacific to Australia, stopping in Hawaii on the way. Stops in the South Pacific included Melbourne, Sydney, and Auckland.

After leaving Australia, the fleet turned north for the Philippines, stopping in Manila, before continuing on to Japan where a welcoming ceremony was held in Yokohama. Three weeks of exercises followed in Subic Bay in the Philippines in November. The ships passed Singapore on 6 December and entered the Indian Ocean; they coaled in Colombo before proceeding to the Suez Canal and coaling again at Port Said, Egypt. The fleet called in several Mediterranean ports before stopping in Gibraltar, where an international fleet of British, Russian, French, and Dutch warships greeted the Americans. The ships then crossed the Atlantic to return to Hampton Roads on 22 February 1909, having traveled 46,729 nautical miles (86,542 km; 53,775 mi). There, they conducted a naval review for Theodore Roosevelt.

=== 1910–1923 ===
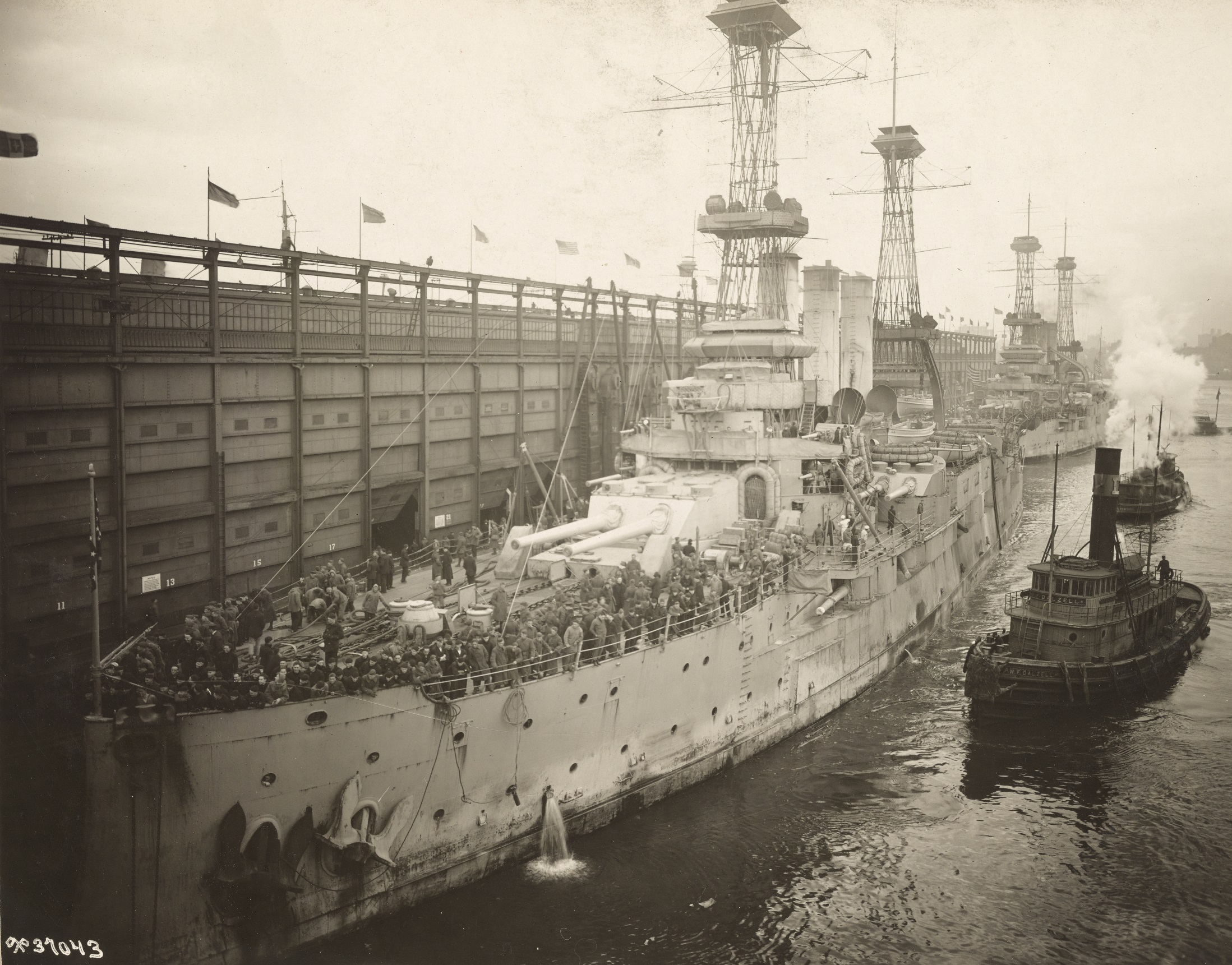
Louisiana and New Hampshire returning US troops in 1919, Pier 4, Hoboken, NJ

Louisiana underwent an extensive overhaul after returning from the voyage, after which she conducted training maneuvers in the Atlantic. Captain Washington Irving Chambers took command of the ship on 1 June. On 1 November 1910, she was assigned to the 2nd Division of the Atlantic Fleet, which crossed the Atlantic to visit British and French cities. A second trip to Europe followed in 1911, this time to the Baltic Sea. There, the ships stopped in Copenhagen, Denmark, Trälhavet, Sweden, Kronstadt, Russia, and Kiel, Germany. They were inspected by the monarchs of each country. The worsening unrest of the Mexican Revolution led the United States to begin intervening in the conflict to protect American interests; in support of these interventions, Louisiana made three trips to Mexico between July 1913 and September 1915. The first lasted from 6 July to 29 December 1913. The second, from 14 April to 8 August 1914, supported the United States occupation of Veracruz. The third deployment lasted from 17 August to 24 September 1915.

After returning from the last operation, Louisiana was reduced to reserve status at Norfolk and employed as a training ship for midshipmen and naval militia units. Following the United States' declaration of war on Germany on 6 April 1917, Louisiana was used to train gunners and engine room personnel. During this period, she was involved in a gunnery accident. During training on 1 June 1918, the crews for three of the 7-inch guns aboard the battleship New Hampshire accidentally began firing at one of the submarine chasers present; they fired several salvos before they received the order to cease fire. One of the shells struck Louisiana, killing one man and wounding several more. The ship was thereafter used to examine one of Arthur Pollen's Argo Clocks, a fire control system that incorporated the first mechanical analog computer. The system was installed starting on 19 June, with work being completed by 1 July.

In September 1918, she was reassigned as a convoy escort; her first operation covered a convoy to Halifax on the 25th of the month. This duty did not last long, as the Germans signed the Armistice that ended the war on 11 November. Louisiana was then used to transport American soldiers back from France, starting on 24 December. The first trip was made in company with New Hampshire, and arrived in Brest, France on 5 January 1919. Between the two of them, they carried 2,169 men back to the United States. She made three additional trips to Brest in this role. After this task ended, she was transferred to the Philadelphia Navy Yard, where she was decommissioned on 20 October 1920. The ship was eventually sold for scrap on 1 November 1923.
