= USS Vermont (BB-20) =

Pre-dreadnought battleship of the United States Navy

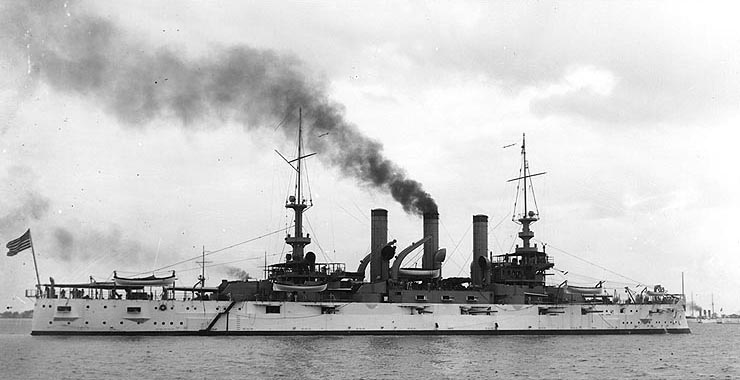
- USS Vermont (BB-20)

History

United States
- Name: Vermont
- Namesake: Vermont
- Builder: Fore River Shipyard
- Laid down: 21 May 1904
- Launched: 31 August 1905
- Commissioned: 4 March 1907
- Decommissioned: 30 June 1920
- Stricken: 10 November 1923
- Fate: Sold for scrap, 30 November 1923

General characteristics
- Class & type: Connecticut-class battleship
- Displacement: Normal: 16,000 long tons (16,000 t); Full load: 17,666 long tons (17,949 t)
- Length: 456 ft 4 in (139.09 m)
- Beam: 76 ft 10 in (23.42 m)
- Draft: 24 ft 6 in (7.47 m)
- Installed power: 12 Babcock & Wilcox boilers; 16,500 ihp (12,300 kW)
- Propulsion: 2 × triple-expansion steam engines; 2 × screw propellers
- Speed: 18 kn (21 mph; 33 km/h)
- Complement: 827 officers and men
- Armament: 4 × 12 in (305 mm)/45 caliber Mark 5 guns; 8 × 8 in (203 mm)/45 caliber guns; 12 × 7 in (178 mm)/45 caliber guns; 20 × 3 in (76 mm)/50 caliber guns; 10 × 3-pounder guns; 4 × 1-pounder guns; 4 × 21 inch (533 mm) torpedo tubes
- Armor: Belt: 6–11 in (152–279 mm); Barbettes: 6–10 in (152–254 mm); Turret Main: 8–12 in (203–305 mm); Turret secondary: 7 in (178 mm); Conning tower: 9 in (229 mm)

USS Vermont (hull number BB-20), a Connecticut-class battleship, was the second ship of the United States Navy named after the 14th state. She was the third member of the class, which included five other ships. The Connecticut-class ships were armed with a main battery of four 12-inch (305 mm) guns and had a top speed of 19 knots (35 km/h; 22 mph). Vermont was laid down in May 1904 at the Fore River shipyard and launched in August 1905. The ship entered service with the Atlantic Fleet in March 1907.

Shortly after she entered service, Vermont joined the Great White Fleet for its circumnavigation of the globe in 1908–1909. She took part in the international Hudson–Fulton Celebration in New York in 1909 and made trips to Europe in 1910 and 1913. Thereafter, the ship became involved in interventions in several Central American countries, including the United States occupation of Veracruz during the Mexican Revolution, where two of her crew earned the Medal of Honor. During the United States' participation in World War I from April 1917 to November 1918, Vermont served as a training ship for engine room personnel. From November 1918 to June 1919, she made a series of trips to return American soldiers from Europe before being decommissioned in June 1920. She was sold for scrap in November 1923 according to the terms of the Washington Naval Treaty.

== Design ==
The Connecticut class followed the Virginia-class battleships, but corrected some of the most significant deficiencies in the earlier design, most notably the superposed arrangement of the main and some of the secondary guns. A heavier tertiary battery of 7 in (178 mm) guns replaced the 6 in (152 mm) guns that had been used on all previous US designs. Despite the improvements, the ships were rendered obsolescent by the revolutionary British battleship HMS Dreadnought, completed before most of the members of the Connecticut class.

Line-drawing of the Connecticut class

Vermont was 456.3 ft (139.1 m) long overall and had a beam of 76.9 ft (23.4 m) and a draft of 24.5 ft (7.5 m). She displaced 16,000 long tons (16,260 t) as designed and up to 17,666 long tons (17,949 t) at full load. The ship was powered by two-shaft triple-expansion steam engines rated at 16,500 indicated horsepower (12,300 kW), with steam provided by twelve coal-fired Babcock & Wilcox boilers ducted into three funnels. The propulsion system generated a top speed of 18 knots (33 km/h; 21 mph). As built, she was fitted with heavy military masts, but these were quickly replaced by lattice masts in 1909. She had a crew of 827 officers and men, though this increased to 881 and later to 896.

The ship was armed with a main battery of four 12 inch /45 Mark 5 (Note: /45 refers to the length of the gun in terms of calibers. A /45 gun is 45 times long as it is in bore diameter.) guns in two twin gun turrets on the centerline, one forward and aft. The secondary battery consisted of eight 8-inch (203 mm) /45 guns and twelve 7-inch (178 mm) /45 guns. The 8-inch guns were mounted in four twin turrets amidships and the 7-inch guns were placed in casemates in the hull. For close-range defense against torpedo boats, she carried twenty 3-inch (76 mm) /50 guns mounted in casemates along the side of the hull and ten 3-pounder guns. She also carried four 37 mm (1.5 in) 1-pounder guns. As was standard for capital ships of the period, Vermont carried four 21 inch (533 mm) torpedo tubes, submerged in her hull on the broadside.

Vermont's main armored belt was 11 in (279 mm) thick over the magazines and the propulsion machinery spaces and 6 in (152 mm) elsewhere. The main battery gun turrets had 12-inch (305 mm) thick faces, and the supporting barbettes had 10 in (254 mm) of armor plating. The secondary turrets had 7 in (178 mm) of frontal armor. The conning tower had 9 in (229 mm) thick sides.

== Service history ==
=== Construction and the Great White Fleet ===
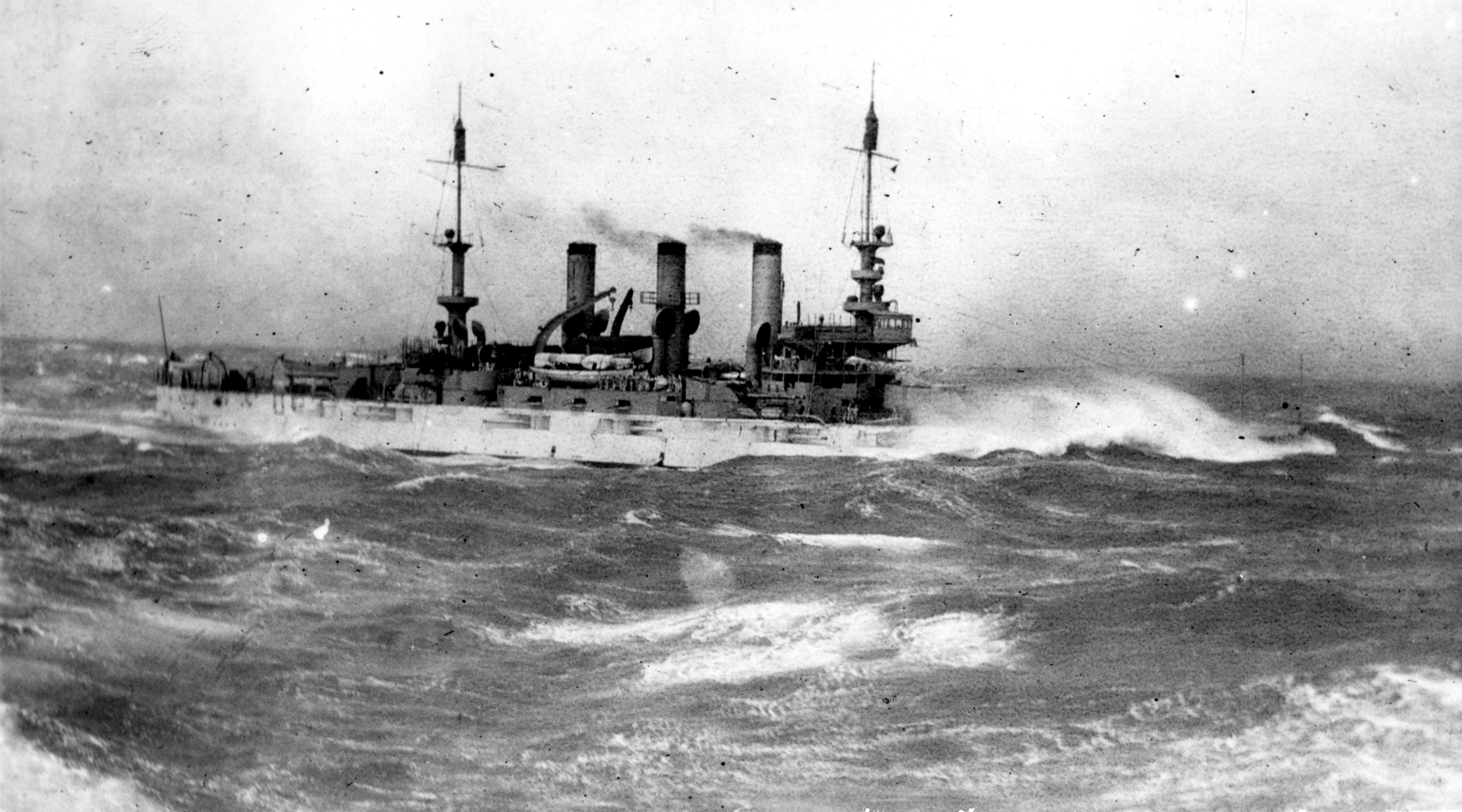
Vermont in heavy seas, probably during the cruise of the Great White Fleet

The keel for Vermont was laid down on 21 May 1904 at the Fore River Shipyard in Quincy, Massachusetts. The completed hull was launched on 31 August 1905, with the christening performed by Jennie Bell, the daughter of Charles J. Bell, the governor of the ship's namesake state. On 4 March 1907, Vermont was commissioned into the US Navy at the Boston Navy Yard, with Captain William P. Potter as her first commanding officer. The ship then embarked on a shakedown cruise from Boston to Hampton Roads, Virginia. She then joined the 1st Division of the Atlantic Fleet for training exercises. Vermont left Hampton Roads on 30 August, bound for Provincetown. She stayed there until 5 September before returning to the Boston Navy Yard two days later for repairs that lasted until November.

On 30 November, the ship left Boston to begin preparations to join the world cruise of the Great White Fleet. The cruise of the Great White Fleet was conceived as a way to demonstrate American military power, particularly to Japan. Tensions had begun to rise between the United States and Japan after the latter's victory in the Russo-Japanese War in 1905, particularly over racist opposition to Japanese immigration to the United States. The press in both countries began to call for war, and Roosevelt hoped to use the demonstration of naval might to deter Japanese aggression.

Her first two stops were in Rhode Island; she took on coal in Bradford before moving to Newport, where she loaded stores. She then steamed to Tompkinsville, New York, to receive her full stock of ammunition. The ship arrived in Hampton Roads on 8 December, where she joined the rest of the Great White Fleet, which was commanded by Rear Admiral Robley D. Evans. Vermont and fifteen other battleships began their voyage on 16 December. The fleet cruised south to the Caribbean and then to South America, making stops in Port of Spain, Rio de Janeiro, Punta Arenas, and Valparaíso, among other cities. After arriving in Mexico in March 1908, the fleet spent three weeks conducting gunnery practice. The fleet then resumed its voyage up the Pacific coast of the Americas, stopping in San Francisco and Seattle before crossing the Pacific to Australia, stopping in Hawaii on the way. Stops in the South Pacific included Melbourne, Sydney, and Auckland.

After leaving Australia, the fleet turned north for the Philippines, stopping in Manila, before continuing on to Japan where a welcoming ceremony was held in Yokohama. Three weeks of exercises followed in Subic Bay in the Philippines in November. The ships passed Singapore on 6 December and entered the Indian Ocean; they coaled in Colombo before proceeding to the Suez Canal and coaling again at Port Said, Egypt. The fleet called in several Mediterranean ports before stopping in Gibraltar, where an international fleet of British, Russian, French, and Dutch warships greeted the Americans. The ships then crossed the Atlantic to return to Hampton Roads on 22 February 1909, having traveled 46,729 nautical miles (86,542 km; 53,775 mi). There, they conducted a naval review for President Theodore Roosevelt. During the cruise, Captain Potter was promoted to rear admiral and advanced to the 1st Division commander; his place as Vermont's commander was taken by Captain Frank Friday Fletcher.

=== Peacetime service, 1909–1913 ===
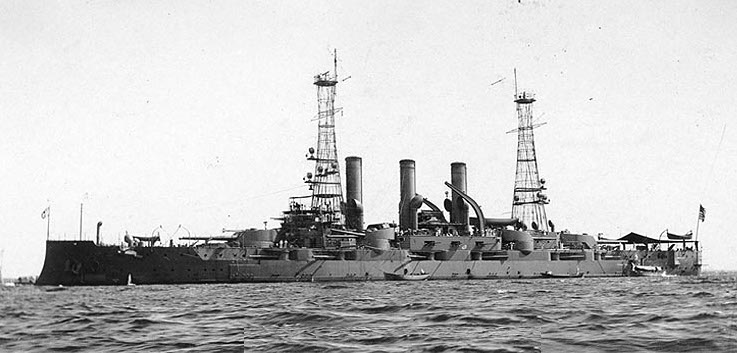
Vermont following her modernization in 1909

Vermont returned to the Boston Navy Yard for repairs after the ceremonies at Hampton Roads concluded; the work lasted from 9 March to 23 June. She then rejoined the fleet off Provincetown; the 1st Division made a trip to Boston for the 4th of July celebration there. Starting on 7 July, the Atlantic Fleet conducted extensive maneuvers until 4 August. Vermont then took part in gunnery training off the Virginia Capes. Additional training exercises followed through the end of the year, interrupted only by visits to New York City and to Stamford, Connecticut, for the Hudson–Fulton Celebration and Columbus Day, respectively. In late December, she was back in New York City. Vermont then steamed south to Guantanamo Bay, Cuba, which she reached on 12 January 1910. Two months of exercises there followed before gunnery training off the Virginia Capes. The ship was back in Boston on 29 April for repairs that lasted until mid-July. After returning to service, she took on a contingent of Naval Militia at Boston for a cruise to Provincetown from 22 to 31 July.

Vermont then steamed to Newport before proceeding to Hampton Roads no 22 August where more target practice followed from 25 to 27 September. She and several other ships from the Atlantic Fleet then visited New York before some minor repairs were effected at the Philadelphia Navy Yard. By this time, the ship had been transferred to the 3rd Division. On 1 November, Vermont and several other ships of the Atlantic Fleet crossed the Atlantic for a visit of several western European ports, including Gravesend from 16 November to 7 December and Brest. The ships left Brest on 30 December to recross the Atlantic, bound for Cuban waters. From 13 January 1911 to 13 March, Vermont and the rest of the ships conducted maneuvers off Cuba. Further exercises followed off the Virginia Capes and in the Chesapeake Bay. A brief stop at Hampton Roads, where she carried target materials, followed on 8 April, though she left later that day for another period in the Philadelphia Navy Yard for repairs.

In mid-1911, Vermont cruised south the Gulf of Mexico, stopping first in Pensacola, Florida. She then continued to Galveston, Texas, stopping there from 7 to 12 June, before returning to Pensacola the following day. The ship returned to the Atlantic and steamed north to Bar Harbor, Maine; she was present there for the 4th of July celebrations, after which the typical routine of training with the Atlantic Fleet off Provincetown and in Cape Cod Bay followed. She remained off New England through mid-August. During this period, she visited Salem, Massachusetts, and underwent repairs at the Boston Navy Yard. Later in the year, she moved south to Tangier Sound and the Virginia Capes for gunnery experiments and target practice. From 12 September to 9 October, Vermont was in the Norfolk Navy Yard for repairs, after which she steamed to Hampton Roads before proceeding with the fleet to New York City for a Naval Review that lasted from 24 October to 2 November. After the conclusion of the review, she joined the 1st Squadron for maneuvers and then returned to Hampton Roads.

Vermont stopped in Tompkinsville on 7–8 December before continuing to the New York Navy Yard later on the 8th for periodic maintenance. On 2 January 1912, she steamed south to the Caribbean for the annual maneuvers off Cuba. She remained in Cuban waters until 9 March, when she returned to the Norfolk Navy Yard. She underwent a major overhaul there that lasted until October. On the 8th, she steamed to New York City, arriving two days later. A Naval Review followed there from 10 to 15 October, followed by maneuvers and gunnery training off the Virginia Capes through December. On 2 November, she joined the search effort for the stranded steamer Noruega, and on 13–15 December she assisted the submarine B-2. Vermont was back in the Norfolk Navy Yard on 25 December, after which she departed for the normal winter training period in Cuban waters. While on the way, she stopped in Colón, Panama, at the entrance to the Panama Canal, which was nearing completion. She arrived in Guantanamo Bay on 19 January 1913 and remained in the area for nearly a month.

=== Interventions in Central America and World War I ===
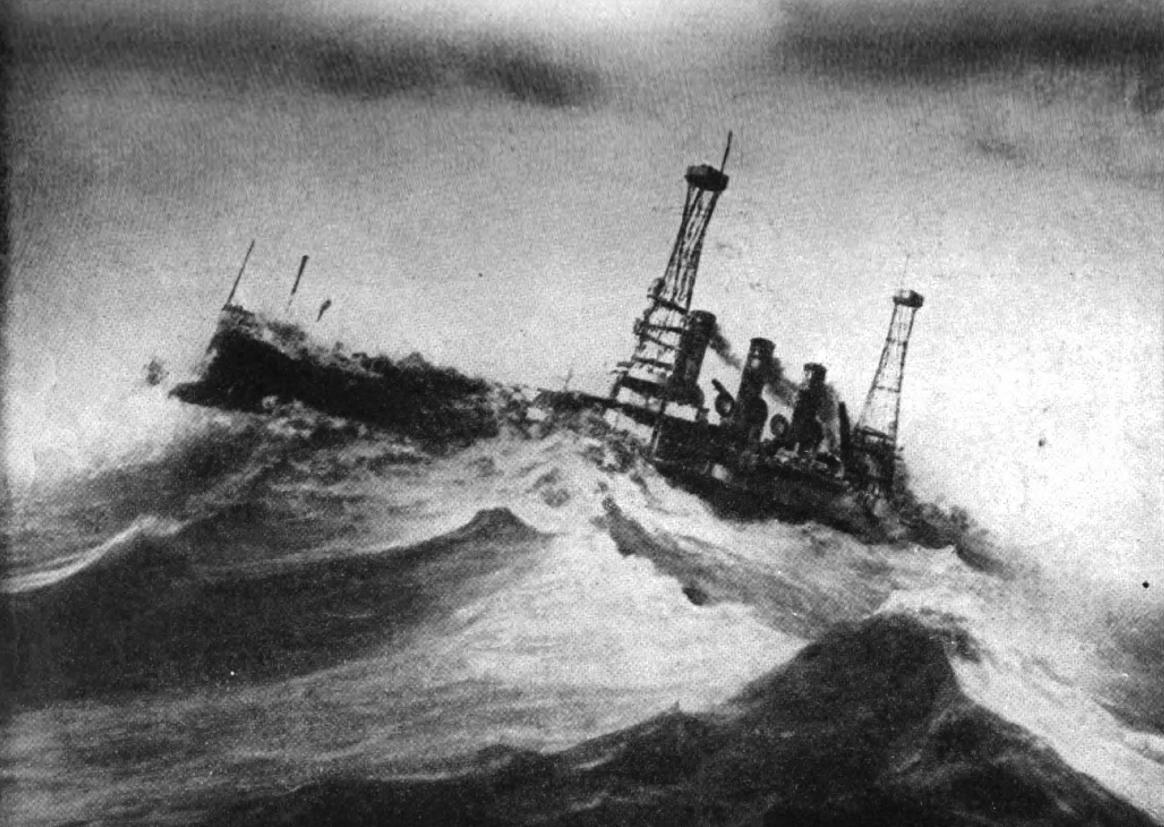
Vermont returning home from Mediterranean cruise hit a gale which resulted in damage to her propeller

On 12 February, the ship departed for Mexico, as the country was in the midst of the Mexican Revolution; Vermont was tasked with protecting American interests in Veracruz. She arrived in the port on 17 February and remained there until 29 April, when she returned to the United States. She rejoined the fleet in Hampton Roads before beginning a training cruise for midshipmen at the US Naval Academy at Annapolis on 6 June. Following the conclusion of the cruise, she operated in Block Island Sound and stopped in Newport. Starting in July, the ship's normal overhaul at Norfolk began, with the work lasting until October. She then took part in gunnery training off the Virginia Capes. Vermont made a second trip to Europe on 25 October, this time to French Mediterranean waters. She stopped in Marseille from 8 November to 1 December and then recrossed the Atlantic. While on the voyage back, a severe storm damaged one of her propellers, which necessitated a tow back to Norfolk, where she arrived on 20 December. Repairs were effected there, which were followed by a short period of sea trials to test the propulsion system.

After their ship returned to service, Vermont's crew began preparations to perform the normal spring target practice off the Virginia Capes, but the exercises were cancelled when the situation in Mexico worsened. Vermont steamed out of Hampton Roads on 15 April, bound for Veracruz. There, she joined her sister New Hampshire, the pre-dreadnought New Jersey, and the dreadnoughts South Carolina and Arkansas. Vermont contributed twelve officers and 308 men to a landing force that occupied the city to prevent an arms shipment—aboard the steamship Ypiranga—from reaching the dictator Victoriano Huerta. One man from Vermont was killed and two earned the Medal of Honor: Lieutenant Julius C. Townsend, the commander of Vermont's contingent, and Surgeon Cary DeVall Langhorne, the regimental surgeon of the Second Seaman Regiment. The ship remained in Veracruz through October, apart from a visit to Tampico from 21 September to 10 October.

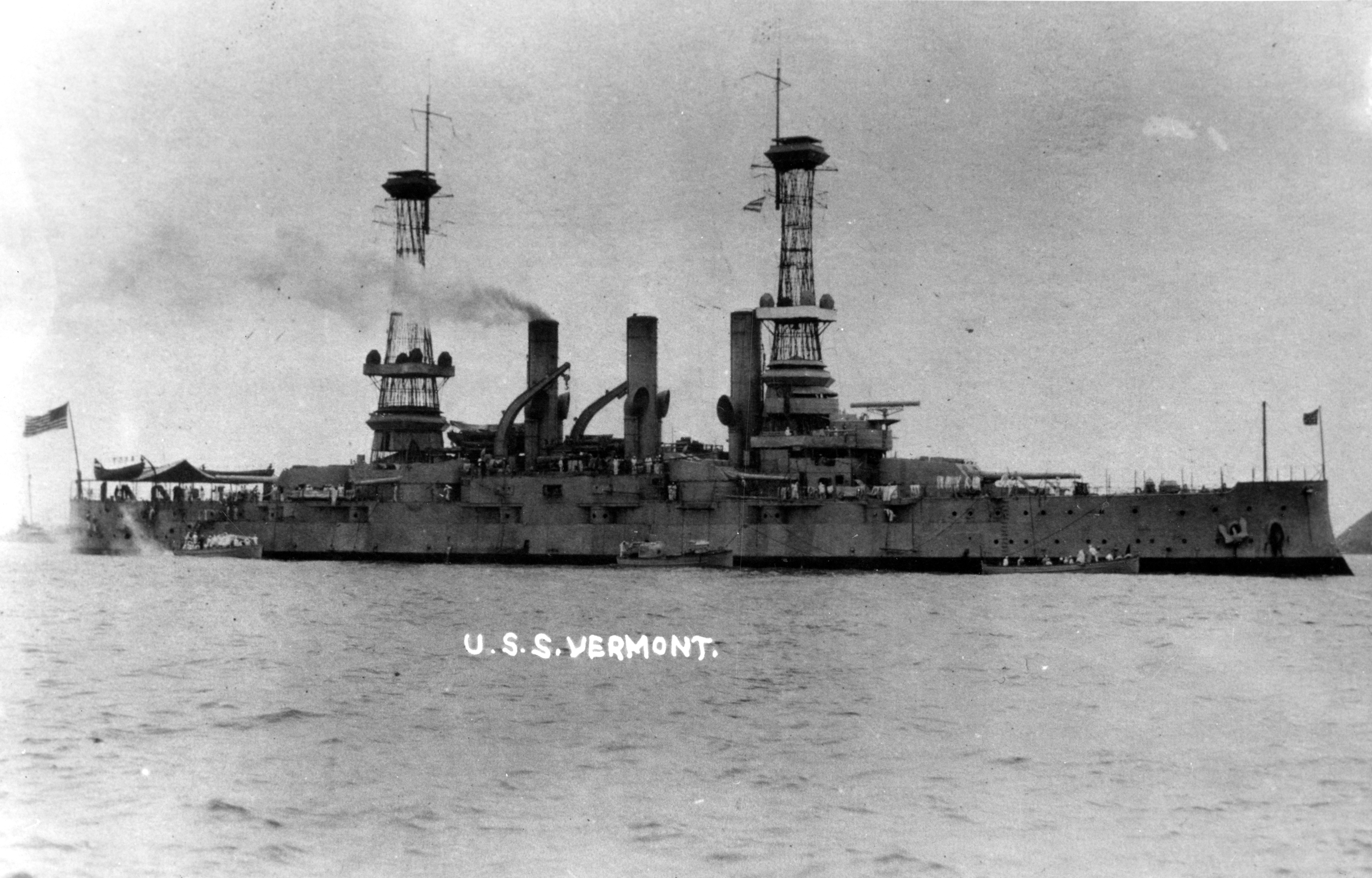
Vermont c. 1919–1920

After returning to the east coast of the United States in late 1914, Vermont resumed her normal routine of training cruises and exercises. The ship was temporarily placed in reserve from 1 October to 21 November 1916, though after returning to service she supported a Marine expeditionary force sent to Haiti. This duty lasted from 29 November to 5 February 1917, after which she took part in battle training in Cuban waters. Vermont arrived back in Norfolk on 29 March before proceeding to Philadelphia for maintenance on 4 April. While she was in dry dock, the United States entered World War I by declaring war on Germany. Vermont's overhaul was completed on 26 August, and she was assigned as a training ship for engine room personnel, based at Hampton Roads. On 28 May 1918, the remains of the Chilean ambassador to the United States were brought aboard the ship. The US ambassador to Chile, Joseph Hooker Shea, came aboard the ship on 3 June, and Vermont departed Norfolk that day. She transited the Panama Canal on 10 June, stopped briefly in Tongoy, Chile, on the 24th, and arrived in Valparaíso three days later. Admiral William B. Caperton and Ambassador Shea escorted the Chilean ambassadors remains ashore.

Vermont left Valparaíso on 2 July, stopping in Callao, Peru, on the way back to the Panama Canal. After returning to the United States, she resumed her training ship duties, which lasted almost to the end of the war. On 5 November, less than a week before the Armistice with Germany ended the fighting in Europe, Vermont was sent to the Philadelphia Navy Yard for conversion into a troop transport. She began her first transport mission on 9 January 1919; she made another three trips to return American soldiers from France, with the last concluding on 20 June 1919. In the course of these voyages, she carried some 5,000 men back to the United States. On 18 July, she steamed out of Norfolk for the last time, bound for the west coast of the United States. She visited San Diego, San Pedro, Monterey, San Francisco, and Long Beach in California, and Astoria, Oregon. Her final destination was the Mare Island Navy Yard at Vallejo, California, where she arrived on 18 September. She was decommissioned there on 30 June 1920 and reclassified as BB-20 on 17 July. She remained there until 10 November 1923, when she was struck from the Naval Vessel Registry. On 30 November, she was sold for scrap and broken up under the terms of the Washington Naval Treaty.
