= Cary DeVall Langhorne =

US Navy officer and Medal of Honor recipient

Cary D. Langhorne
- Born: May 14, 1873; Lynchburg, Virginia, US
- Died: April 25, 1948 (aged 74); Fauquier County, Virginia, US
- Burial place: Arlington National Cemetery, Arlington, Virginia
- Military career
- Allegiance: United States of America
- Branch: United States Navy
- Service years: 1898–1919
- Rank: Commander
- Unit: USS Vermont
- Conflicts: Philippine Insurrection; United States occupation of Veracruz; World War I
- Awards: Medal of Honor

Cary DeVall Langhorne (May 14, 1873 – April 25, 1948) was a Commander in the United States Navy Medical Corps and a Medal of Honor recipient for his role in the United States occupation of Veracruz.

== Biography ==
Langhorne graduated from the Virginia Military Institute in 1894, and received his medical degree from the University of Virginia in 1897.

Langhorne joined the Navy as an assistant surgeon in 1898. Sent to the Philippines, he was wounded at Noveleta in October 1899 during the Philippine Insurrection when a battalion of Marines led by Lt. Col. George F. Elliott was sent to capture the town. Langhorne was subsequently mentioned in dispatches for his gallantry in action. He was promoted to surgeon in 1903.

After his Medal of Honor action, Langhorne resigned from the regular Navy in 1916 and served as a Naval Reserve Force officer during World War I. He served as senior surgeon with the rank of lieutenant commander aboard the troop transport USS President Grant. After the war, Langhorne left military service on May 26, 1919 and was promoted to commander on the reserve retired list.

In 1913, Langhorne purchased St. Brides Farm near Delaplane and Upperville in Fauquier County, Virginia. In 1916–1917, he had a 12,500 square foot Georgian manor house built for himself using noted Oval Office architect Nathan C. Wyeth. Langhorne died April 25, 1948, at St. Brides and is buried in Arlington National Cemetery, Arlington, Virginia. His grave can be found in section 11, grave 868.

== Medal of Honor citation ==
Rank and organization: Surgeon, U.S. Navy. Born: 14 May 1873, Lynchburg, Va. Accredited to: Virginia. G.O. No.: 177, 4 December 1915.

Citation:

For extraordinary heroism in battle, engagement of Vera Cruz, 22 April 1914. Surg. Langhorne carried a wounded man from the front of the Naval Academy while under heavy fire.

== See also ==
- List of Medal of Honor recipients (Veracruz)
