= USS Kansas (BB-21) =

United States Navy battleship

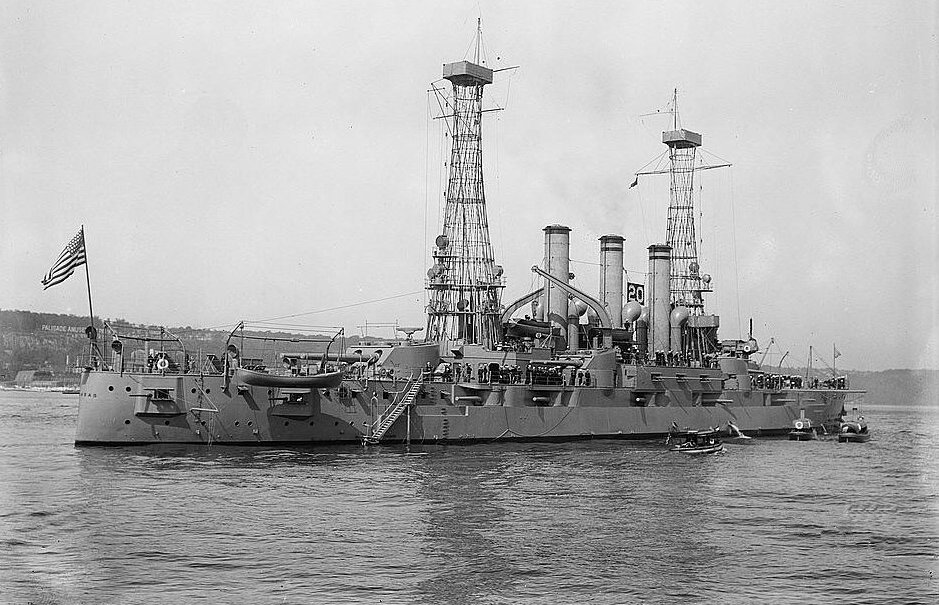
- USS Kansas (BB-21) c. 1910–1915

History

United States
- Name: Kansas
- Namesake: State of Kansas
- Ordered: 3 March 1903
- Builder: New York Shipbuilding Company
- Laid down: 10 February 1904
- Launched: 12 August 1905
- Commissioned: 18 April 1907
- Decommissioned: 16 December 1921
- Stricken: 10 November 1923
- Fate: Broken up, 1924

General characteristics
- Class & type: Connecticut-class battleship
- Displacement: Normal: 16,000 long tons (16,000 t); Full load: 17,666 long tons (17,949 t)
- Length: 456 ft 4 in (139.09 m)
- Beam: 76 ft 10 in (23.42 m)
- Draft: 24 ft 6 in (7.47 m)
- Installed power: 12 Babcock & Wilcox boilers; 16,500 ihp (12,300 kW)
- Propulsion: 2 × triple-expansion steam engines; 2 × screw propellers
- Speed: 18 kn (21 mph; 33 km/h)
- Complement: 827 officers and men
- Armament: 4 × 12 in (305 mm)/45 caliber Mark 5 guns; 8 × 8 in (203 mm)/45 caliber guns; 12 × 7 in (178 mm)/45 caliber guns; 20 × 3 in (76 mm)/50 caliber guns; 12 × 3-pounder guns; 4 × 1-pounder guns; 4 × 21 inch (533 mm) torpedo tubes
- Armor: Belt: 6–11 in (152–279 mm); Barbettes: 6–10 in (152–254 mm); Turret Main: 8–12 in (203–305 mm); Turret secondary: 7 in (178 mm); Conning tower: 9 in (229 mm)

USS Kansas (hull number BB-21) was a US Connecticut-class pre-dreadnought battleship, the fourth of six ships in the class. She was the second ship of the United States Navy named Kansas, but the only one named in honor of the state of Kansas. (Note: The Civil War era gunboat Kansas was named for the Kansas River.) The ship was launched in August 1905 and commissioned into the fleet in April 1907. Kansas was armed with a main battery of four 12-inch (305 mm) guns and was capable of a top speed of 18 kn (33 km/h; 21 mph).

Shortly after she entered service, Kansas joined the Great White Fleet for its circumnavigation of the globe in 1908–1909. She made trips to Europe in 1910 and 1911 and after 1912, became involved in suppressing unrest in several Central American countries, including the United States occupation of Veracruz during the Mexican Revolution. After the United States entered World War I in April 1917, Kansas was employed as a training ship for new personnel. In September 1918, she began escorting convoys to Europe. After the war ended in November, she then began a series of trips to France to bring American soldiers home.

The ship's postwar career was short. She conducted training cruises for US Naval Academy cadets in 1920 and 1921, the first to the Pacific and the second to Europe. During this period she served briefly as the flagship of the 4th Battleship Division. After returning from the second cruise, Kansas was decommissioned and sold for scrap in August 1923 according to the terms of the Washington Naval Treaty.

== Design ==
The Connecticut class followed the Virginia-class battleships, but corrected some of the most significant deficiencies in the earlier design, most notably the superposed arrangement of the main and some of the secondary guns. A heavier tertiary battery of 7 in (178 mm) guns replaced the 6 in (152 mm) guns that had been used on all previous US designs. Despite the improvements, the ships were rendered obsolescent by the revolutionary British battleship HMS Dreadnought, completed before most of the members of the Connecticut class.

Line-drawing of the Connecticut class

Kansas was 456.3 ft (139.1 m) long overall and had a beam of 76.9 ft (23.4 m) and a draft of 24.5 ft (7.5 m). She displaced 16,000 long tons (16,260 t) as designed and up to 17,666 long tons (17,949 t) at full load. The ship was powered by two-shaft triple-expansion steam engines rated at 16,500 indicated horsepower (12,300 kW), with steam provided by twelve coal-fired Babcock & Wilcox boilers ducted into three funnels. The propulsion system generated a top speed of 18 knots (33 km/h; 21 mph). As built, she was fitted with heavy military masts, but these were quickly replaced by lattice masts in 1909. As completed, she had a crew of 827 officers and men, though this increased to 881 and later to 896.

The ship was armed with a main battery of four 12 inch/45 Mark 5 (Note: /45 refers to the length of the gun in terms of calibers. A /45 gun is 45 times long as it is in bore diameter.) guns in two twin gun turrets on the centerline, one forward and aft. The secondary battery consisted of eight 8-inch (203 mm)/45 guns and twelve 7-inch (178 mm)/45 guns. The 8-inch guns were mounted in four twin turrets amidships and the 7-inch guns were placed in casemates in the hull. For close-range defense against torpedo boats, she carried twenty 3-inch (76 mm)/50 guns mounted in casemates along the side of the hull and twelve 3-pounder guns. She also carried four 37 mm (1.5 in) 1-pounder guns. As was standard for capital ships of the period, Kansas carried four 21 inch (533 mm) torpedo tubes, submerged in her hull on the broadside.

Kansas's main armored belt was 11 in (279 mm) thick over the magazines and the propulsion machinery spaces and 6 in (152 mm) elsewhere. The main battery gun turrets had 12-inch (305 mm) thick faces, and the supporting barbettes had 10 in (254 mm) of armor plating. The secondary turrets had 7 in (178 mm) of frontal armor. The conning tower had 9 in (229 mm) thick sides.

== Service history ==
=== Construction and the Great White Fleet ===
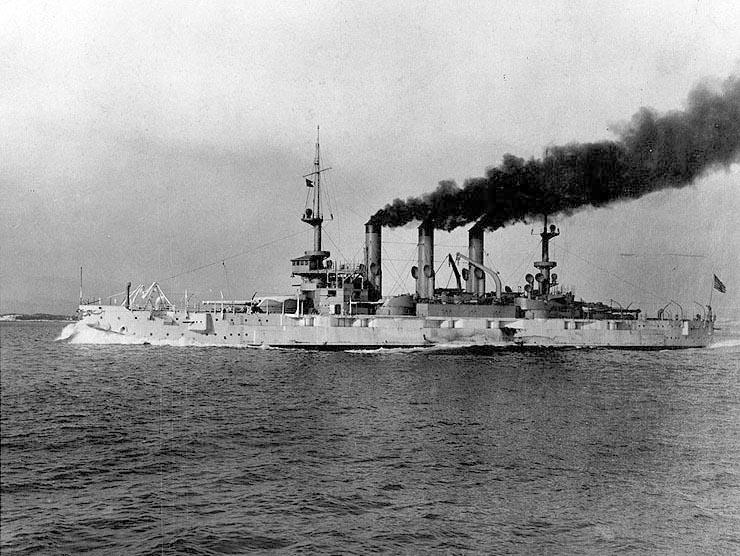
Kansas on trials in 1906; note the 7-inch guns have not been installed

The keel for Kansas was laid down at the New York Shipbuilding Corporation of Camden, New Jersey. She was launched on 12 August 1905. After completing fitting-out work, the ship was commissioned into the fleet on 18 April 1907 in Philadelphia. Captain Charles E. Vreeland was the ship's first commanding officer. She began a shakedown cruise on 17 August off Provincetown, Massachusetts, that revealed the need for modifications, which began at Philadelphia on 24 September. On 9 December, she joined the ships that would be assigned to the Great White Fleet in Hampton Roads.

On 16 December, Kansas steamed out of Hampton Roads with the Great White Fleet for a circumnavigation of the globe. The cruise of the Great White Fleet was conceived as a way to demonstrate American military power, particularly to Japan. Tensions had begun to rise between the United States and Japan after the latter's victory in the Russo-Japanese War in 1905, particularly over racist opposition to Japanese immigration to the United States. The press in both countries began to call for war, and Roosevelt hoped to use the demonstration of naval might to deter Japanese aggression. The cruise was also intended to assert the United States' status as a global naval power and to convince Congress of the need to support increased naval expenditures. The fleet cruised south to the Caribbean and then to South America, making stops in Port of Spain, Rio de Janeiro, Punta Arenas, and Valparaíso, among other cities. After arriving in Mexico in March 1908, the fleet spent three weeks conducting gunnery practice The fleet then resumed its voyage up the Pacific coast of the Americas, stopping in San Francisco and Seattle before crossing the Pacific to Australia, stopping in Hawaii on the way. Stops in the South Pacific included Melbourne, Sydney, and Auckland.

The fleet then turned north for the Philippines, stopping in Manila, before continuing on to Japan where a welcoming ceremony was held in Yokohama. Three weeks of exercises followed in Subic Bay in the Philippines in November. The ships passed Singapore on 6 December and entered the Indian Ocean; they coaled in Colombo before proceeding to the Suez Canal and coaling again at Port Said, Egypt. The fleet called in several Mediterranean ports before stopping in Gibraltar, where an international fleet of British, Russian, French, and Dutch warships greeted the Americans. The ships then crossed the Atlantic to return to Hampton Roads on 22 February 1909, having traveled 46,729 nautical miles (86,542 km; 53,775 mi). There, they conducted a naval review for President Theodore Roosevelt.

=== Peacetime activities ===
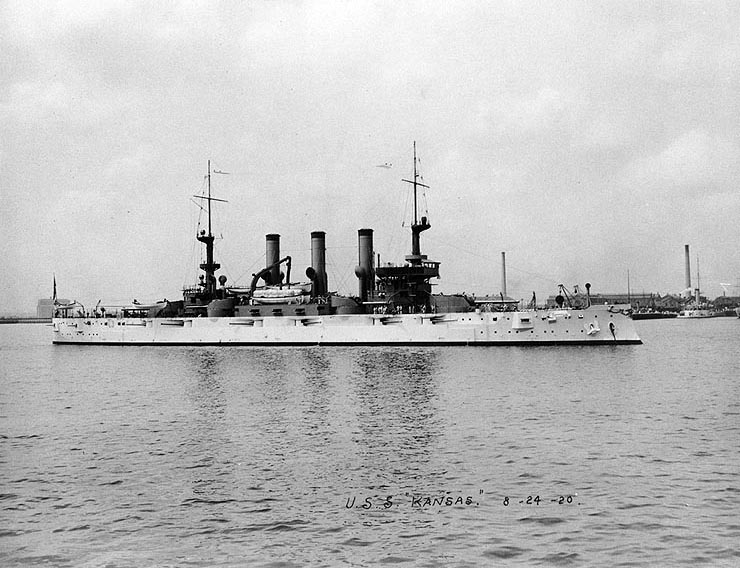
Kansas c. 1907

A week after returning from the voyage, Kansas steamed to the Philadelphia Naval Shipyard for an overhaul after the lengthy period at sea. The work was completed on 17 June, and Kansas thereafter began a peacetime routine of maneuvers and various training exercises that continued throughout the following year. On 15 November 1910, she joined the 2nd Battleship Division for a cruise to Europe, stopping in Cherbourg, France, and Portland, England. The ships then recrossed the Atlantic, stopping in Santo Domingo and Cuba before continuing on to Hampton Roads. A second trip to Europe took place in mid-1911; this time, the division steamed into the Baltic Sea, visiting several ports in the region, including Copenhagen, Denmark, Stockholm, Sweden, Kronstadt, Russia, and Kiel, Germany. The ships arrived back in Provincetown on 13 July and thereafter joined fleet training exercises off the Virginia Capes. Kansas steamed to the Norfolk Navy Yard on 3 November for another overhaul.

Kansas began a series of extensive maneuvers in early 1912, based out of Guantánamo Bay, Cuba. She returned to Hampton Roads to greet a squadron of German warships—the battlecruiser SMS Moltke and the light cruisers Bremen and Stettin—that visited the port from 28 May to 8 June. Kansas then embarked on a training cruise along the east coast of the United States for midshipmen from the US Naval Academy on 21 June. She returned the midshipmen to Annapolis on 30 August. On 15 November, she began a training cruise to the Gulf of Mexico, arriving back in Philadelphia for an overhaul on 21 December. She returned to duty on 5 May 1913 and cruised the east coast for the next several months. On 25 October, she crossed the Atlantic and cruised the Mediterranean Sea, which included a stop in Genoa, Italy. After returning to Guantánamo Bay, she was sent to the coast of Mexico to protect US interests during the Mexican Revolution. The ship was back in Norfolk on 14 March 1914, and another overhaul at Philadelphia followed on 11 April. On 1 July, Kansas steamed out of Norfolk to carry the remains of the recently deceased Venezuelan ambassador to the United States back to his home country. She arrived in La Guaira on 14 July before returning to the Mexican coast to support the forces occupying Veracruz. She left the area on 29 October to respond to unrest in Port au Prince, Haiti, arriving on 3 November. She remained there for a month before departing on 1 December for Philadelphia. The ship then resumed the normal peacetime routine of training exercises off the east coast and off Cuba until 30 September 1916, when she underwent another overhaul in Philadelphia.

=== World War I ===
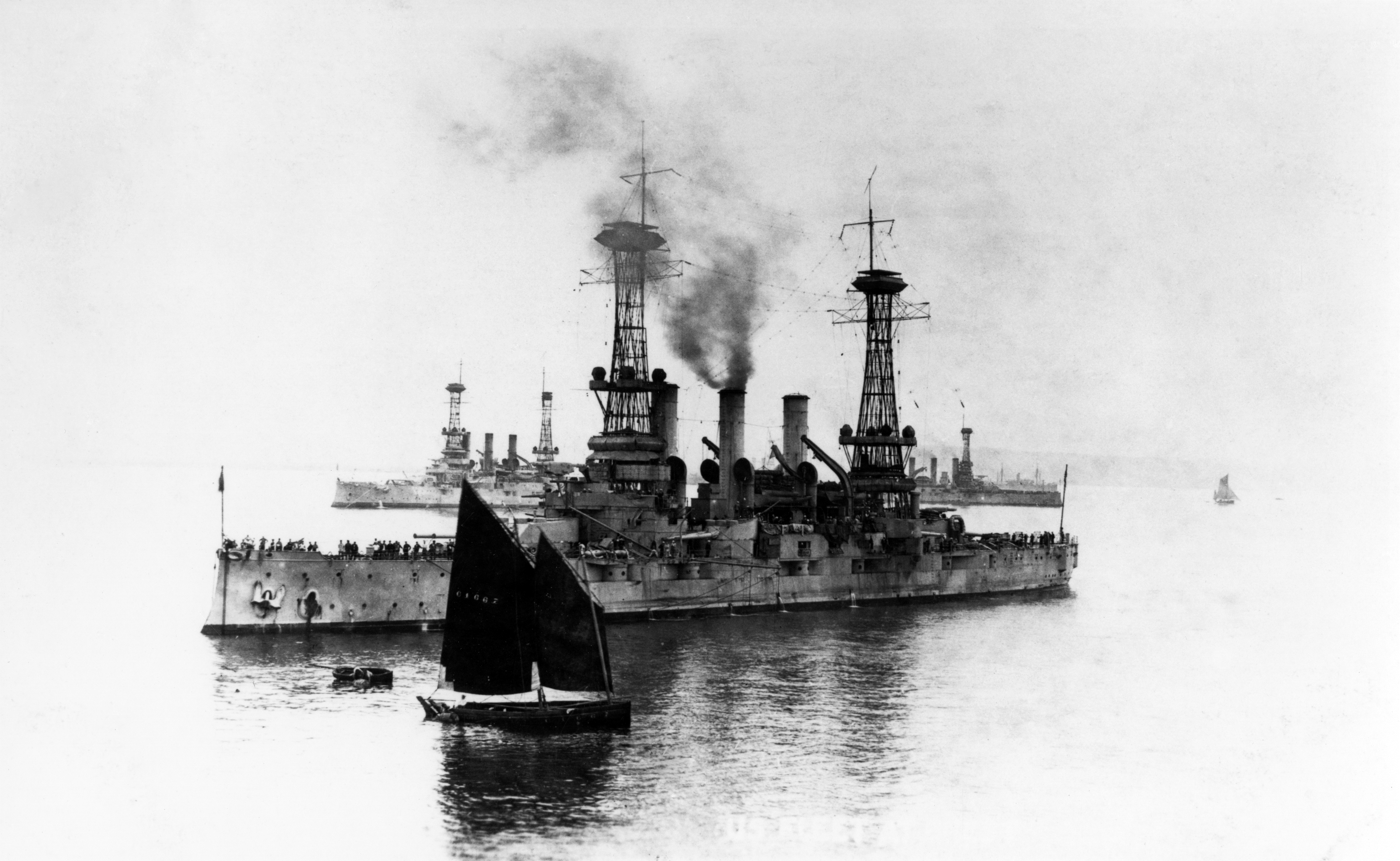
Kansas in Brest, France, in 1919; New Hampshire (left) and Connecticut (right) are visible in the distance

She was still in dry dock when the United States declared war on Germany on 6 April 1917. On 10 July, she was assigned to the 4th Battleship Division (4th BatDiv) and was tasked primarily with training naval personnel in the Chesapeake Bay. In September 1918, she was assigned to convoy escort duty, with the first such mission on 6 September. The ship departed with her sister ship USS New Hampshire and the dreadnought USS South Carolina to protect a fast HX troopship convoy. On 16 September, the three battleships left the convoy in the Atlantic and steamed back to the United States, while other escorts brought the convoy into port. On the 17th, South Carolina slipped her starboard propeller, which forced her to reduce speed to 11 knots (20 km/h; 13 mph) using only the port shaft. Kansas and New Hampshire remained with South Carolina to escort her back to port. Convoy duty did not last long, as the Germans signed the Armistice that ended the war on 11 November.

Following the end of the war in November 1918, she joined the effort to return American soldiers from France, making five trips to Brest, France. The first of these took place in December; Kansas and the battleship Georgia departed on 10 December and arrived in Brest on the 22nd. The two ships embarked a total of 2,732 soldiers between them over the course of four days before departing for the return trip. A major overhaul at Philadelphia followed from 29 June 1919 to 17 May 1920. She then proceeded to Annapolis, arriving on the 20th and embarking midshipmen for another training cruise, this time to the Pacific Ocean. She passed through the Panama Canal and visited a number of ports on the west coast, including Honolulu, Seattle, San Francisco, and San Pedro. She left San Pedro on 11 August bound for the Panama Canal and crossed into the Caribbean for a stop at Guantánamo Bay. Kansas arrived back in Annapolis on 2 September, where she disembarked the midshipmen. Rear Admiral Charles Frederick Hughes raised his flag aboard Kansas in Philadelphia as the flagship of the 4th BatDiv.

The ship departed on 27 September for a cruise to the Caribbean. While in Grassey Bay, Bermuda on 2 October, Edward, Prince of Wales, visited the ship. On the 4th, she passed through the Panama Canal and steamed to American Samoa, stopping in Pago Pago, Samoa on 11 November. Kansas then visited Hawaii before crossing back through the Panama Canal and eventually returning to Philadelphia on 7 March 1921. Another midshipmen training cruise followed on 4 June; three other battleships joined her for a visit to European waters. Stops included Oslo, Norway, Lisbon, Portugal, and Gibraltar. They passed through Guantánamo Bay before returning to Annapolis on 28 August. A visit to New York followed from 3 to 19 September. She arrived back at Philadelphia the following day, where she was decommissioned on 16 December. Kansas was stricken from the Naval Vessel Register on 24 August 1923 in accordance with the terms of the Washington Naval Treaty and was subsequently broken up for scrap.
