= USS Minnesota (BB-22) =

Pre-dreadnought battleship of the United States Navy

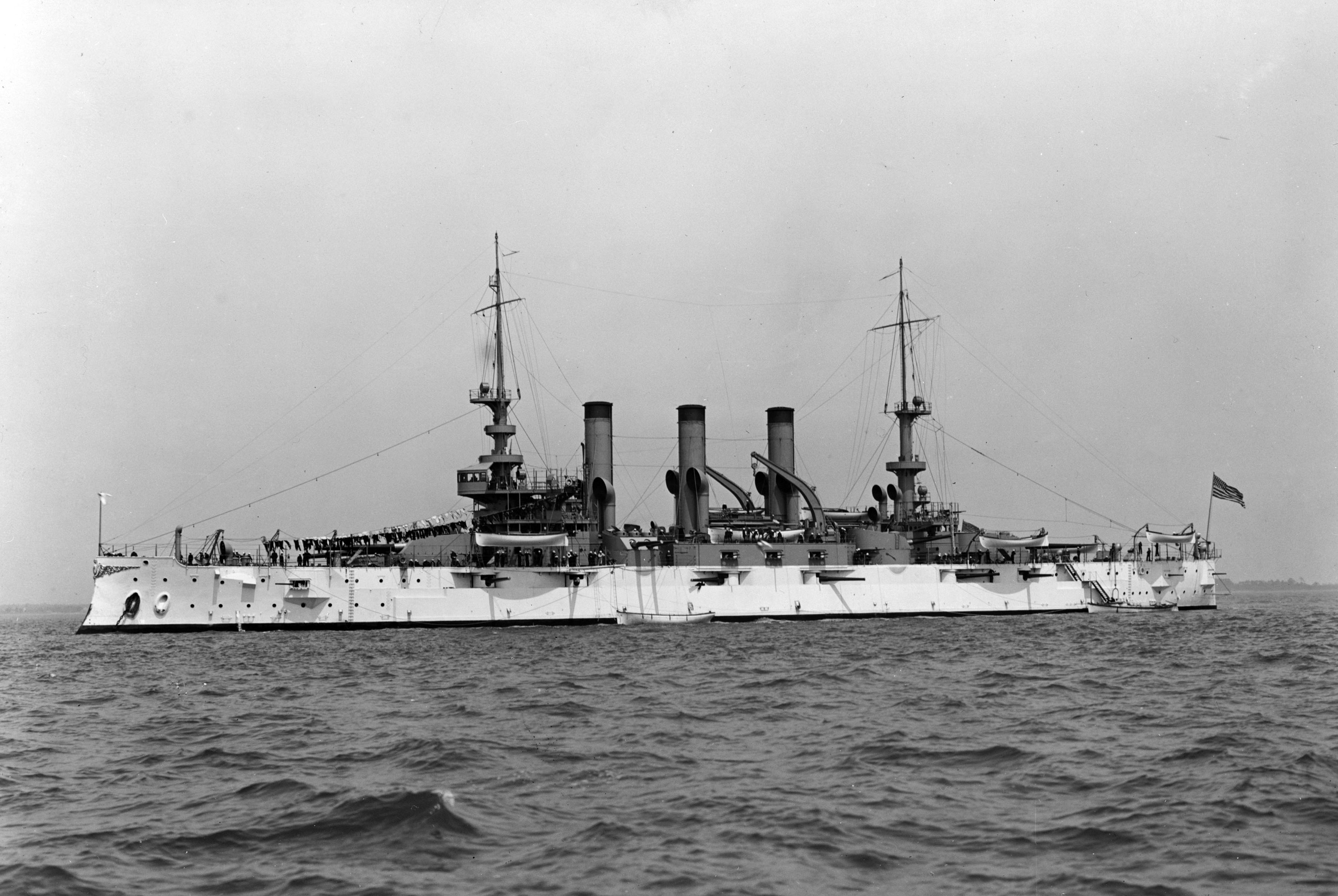
- USS Minnesota (BB-22) in 1907

History

United States
- Name: Minnesota
- Namesake: Minnesota
- Builder: Newport News Shipbuilding Company
- Laid down: 27 October 1903
- Launched: 8 April 1905
- Commissioned: 9 March 1907
- Decommissioned: 1 December 1921
- Stricken: 10 November 1923
- Fate: Broken up, 1924

General characteristics
- Class & type: Connecticut-class battleship
- Displacement: Normal: 16,000 long tons (16,000 t); Full load: 17,666 long tons (17,949 t)
- Length: 456 ft 4 in (139.09 m)
- Beam: 76 ft 10 in (23.42 m)
- Draft: 24 ft 6 in (7.47 m)
- Installed power: 12 Babcock & Wilcox boilers; 16,500 ihp (12,300 kW)
- Propulsion: 2 × triple-expansion steam engines; 2 × screw propellers
- Speed: 18 kn (21 mph; 33 km/h)
- Complement: 827 officers and men
- Armament: 4 × 12 in (305 mm)/45 caliber Mark 5 guns; 8 × 8 in (203 mm)/45 caliber guns; 12 × 7 in (178 mm)/45 caliber guns; 20 × 3 in (76 mm)/50 caliber guns; 12 × 3-pounder guns; 2 × 1-pounder guns; 4 × 21 inch (533 mm) torpedo tubes
- Armor: Belt: 6–9 in (152–229 mm); Barbettes: 6–10 in (152–254 mm); Turret Main: 8–12 in (203–305 mm); Turret secondary: 7 in (178 mm); Conning tower: 9 in (229 mm)

USS Minnesota (hull number: BB-22), the fifth of six Connecticut-class pre-dreadnought battleships, was the first ship of the United States Navy named in honor of the 32nd state. She was laid down at the Newport News Shipbuilding Company of Newport News, Virginia in October 1903, launched in April 1905, and commissioned into the US fleet in March 1907, just four months after the revolutionary British battleship HMS Dreadnought entered service. Minnesota was armed with a main battery of four 12-inch (305 mm) guns and a secondary battery of twenty 7 and 8 in (178 and 203 mm) guns, unlike Dreadnought, which carried an all-big-gun armament that rendered ships like Minnesota obsolescent.

Shortly after she entered service, Minnesota joined the Great White Fleet for its circumnavigation of the globe in 1908–1909. The years from 1909 to 1912 were uneventful, but thereafter the ship began to become involved in conflicts in the Caribbean. She supported efforts to put down an insurrection in Cuba in 1912 and patrolled the coast of Mexico in 1913–1914 during the Mexican Revolution. In 1916, the ship was placed in reserve, though she quickly returned to service when the United States entered World War I in April 1917. During the war, she trained naval personnel; while cruising off the eastern coast of the United States in September 1918, she struck a naval mine laid by a German U-boat. The extensive damage required lengthy repairs that kept her out of service for the rest of the war. She helped to return American soldiers from Europe in 1919 before resuming her training ship duties in 1920–1921, before being decommissioned in December 1921 and broken up for scrap at the Philadelphia Navy Yard in 1924.

== Design ==
The Connecticut class followed the Virginia-class battleships, but corrected some of the most significant deficiencies in the earlier design, most notably the superposed arrangement of the main and some of the secondary guns. A heavier tertiary battery of 7 in (178 mm) guns replaced the 6 in (152 mm) guns that had been used on all previous US designs. Despite the improvements, the ships were rendered obsolescent by the revolutionary British battleship HMS Dreadnought, completed before most of the members of the Connecticut class.

Line-drawing of the Connecticut class

Minnesota was 456.3 ft (139.1 m) long overall and had a beam of 76.9 ft (23.4 m) and a draft of 24.5 ft (7.5 m). She displaced 16,000 long tons (16,260 t) as designed and up to 17,666 long tons (17,949 t) at full load. The ship was powered by two-shaft triple-expansion steam engines rated at 16,500 indicated horsepower (12,300 kW), with steam provided by twelve coal-fired Babcock & Wilcox boilers ducted into three funnels. The propulsion system generated a top speed of 18 knots (33 km/h; 21 mph). As built, she was fitted with heavy military masts, but these were quickly replaced by lattice masts in 1909. She had a crew of 827 officers and men, though this increased to 881 and later to 896.

The ship was armed with a main battery of four 12 inch /45 Mark 5 (Note: /45 refers to the length of the gun in terms of calibers. A /45 gun is 45 times long as it is in bore diameter.) guns in two twin gun turrets on the centerline, one forward and aft. The secondary battery consisted of eight 8-inch (203 mm) /45 guns and twelve 7-inch (178 mm) /45 guns. The 8-inch guns were mounted in four twin turrets amidships and the 7-inch guns were placed in casemates in the hull. For close-range defense against torpedo boats, she carried twenty 3-inch (76 mm) /50 guns mounted in casemates along the side of the hull and twelve 3-pounder guns. She also carried two 37 mm (1.5 in) 1-pounder guns. As was standard for capital ships of the period, Minnesota carried four 21 inch (533 mm) torpedo tubes, submerged in her hull on the broadside.

Minnesota's main armored belt was 9 in (229 mm) thick over the magazines and the propulsion machinery spaces and 6 in (152 mm) elsewhere. The main battery gun turrets had 12-inch (305 mm) thick faces, and the supporting barbettes had 10 in (254 mm) of armor plating. The secondary turrets had 7 in (178 mm) of frontal armor. The conning tower had 9 in (229 mm) thick sides.

== Service history ==
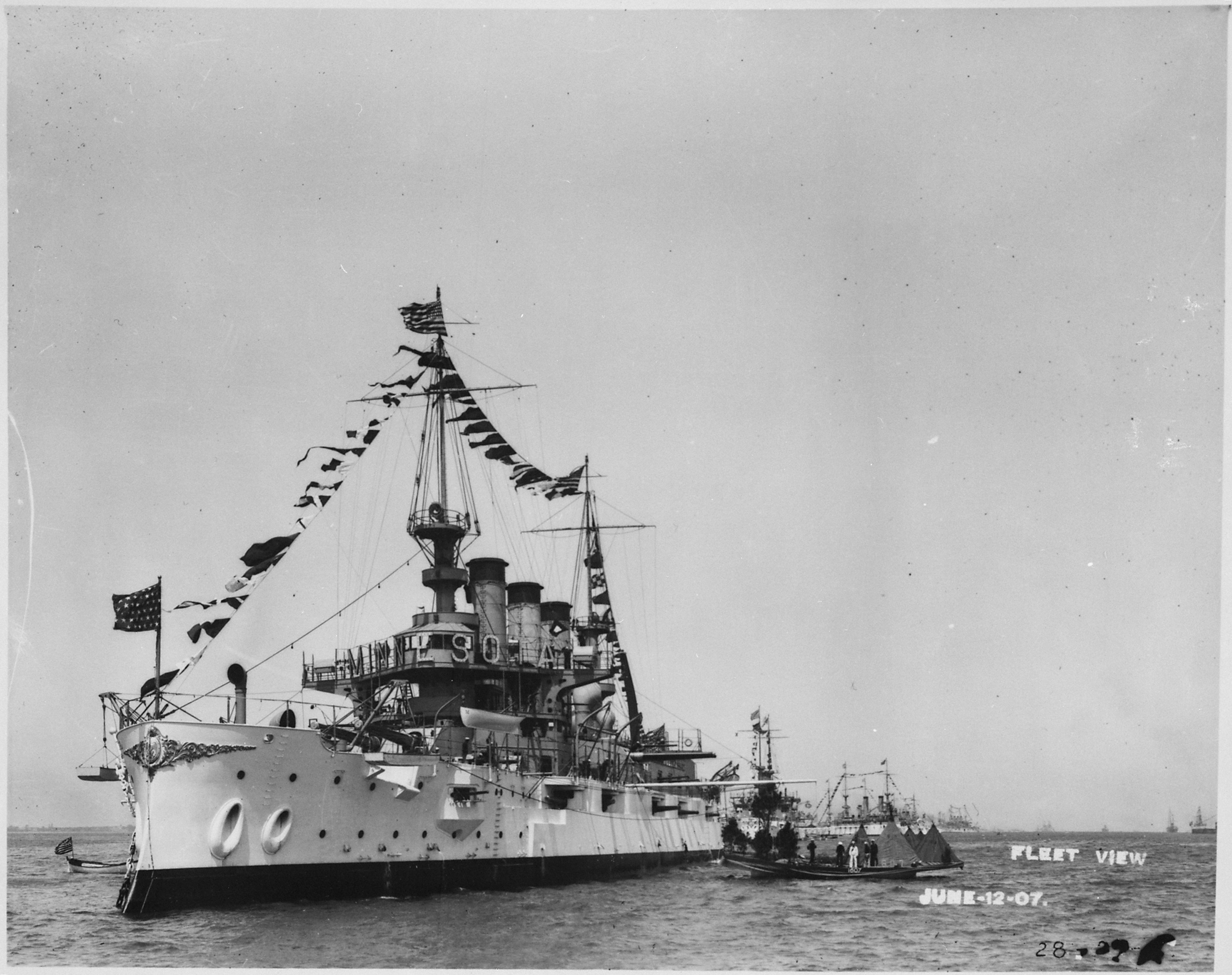
Minnesota in June 1907

The keel for Minnesota was laid down at the Newport News Shipbuilding Company of Newport News, Virginia on 27 October 1903. The completed hull was launched on 8 April 1905. The ship was commissioned into the US Navy on 9 March 1907, with Captain John Hubbard as her first commanding officer. The ship then conducted a shakedown cruise off the coast of New England before attending the Jamestown Exposition, the commemoration of the 300th anniversary of the Jamestown colony, the first permanent English settlement in the Americas. She was present at the ceremony from 22 April to 3 September.

On 16 December, Minnesota steamed out of Hampton Roads with the Great White Fleet for a circumnavigation of the globe. The cruise of the Great White Fleet was conceived as a way to demonstrate American military power, particularly to Japan. Tensions had begun to rise between the United States and Japan after the latter's victory in the Russo-Japanese War in 1905, particularly over racist opposition to Japanese immigration to the United States. The press in both countries began to call for war, and Roosevelt hoped to use the demonstration of naval might to deter Japanese aggression. The cruise was also intended to assert the United States' status as a global naval power and to convince Congress of the need to support increased naval expenditures. The fleet cruised south to the Caribbean and then to South America, making stops in Port of Spain, Rio de Janeiro, Punta Arenas, and Valparaíso, among other cities. After arriving in Mexico in March 1908, the fleet spent three weeks conducting gunnery practice. The fleet then resumed its voyage up the Pacific coast of the Americas, stopping in San Francisco and Seattle before crossing the Pacific to Australia, stopping in Hawaii on the way. Stops in the South Pacific included Melbourne, Sydney, and Auckland.

The fleet then turned north for the Philippines, stopping in Manila, before continuing on to Japan where a welcoming ceremony was held in Yokohama. Three weeks of exercises followed in Subic Bay in the Philippines in November. The ships passed Singapore on 6 December and entered the Indian Ocean; they coaled in Colombo before proceeding to the Suez Canal and coaling again at Port Said, Egypt. The fleet called in several Mediterranean ports before stopping in Gibraltar, where an international fleet of British, Russian, French, and Dutch warships greeted the Americans. The ships then crossed the Atlantic to return to Hampton Roads on 22 February 1909, having traveled 46,729 nautical miles (86,542 km; 53,775 mi). There, they conducted a naval review for President Theodore Roosevelt.

Upon her return, Minnesota was assigned to the Atlantic Fleet. She spent the following three years on the eastern coast of the United States conducting a peacetime routine of training cruises, apart from one voyage to the English Channel in 1910. Starting in 1912, the ship began to operate in the Caribbean, particularly after unrest began to break out in several countries in the region. For the first six months of 1912, she patrolled Cuban waters; she went to the US base at Guantanmo Bay to support the suppression of an insurrection on the island from 7 to 22 June. In mid-1913, she patrolled the eastern coast of Mexico during the Mexican Revolution. She returned in 1914, with stints there from 26 January to 7 August and 11 October to 19 December. During the first period, the United States occupied Veracruz to protect US interests. In 1915, Minnesota returned to the United States and resumed her previous routine of training exercises with occasional cruises to the Caribbean. In November 1916, she was placed in reserve as the flagship of the Reserve Force, Atlantic Fleet.

=== World War I ===
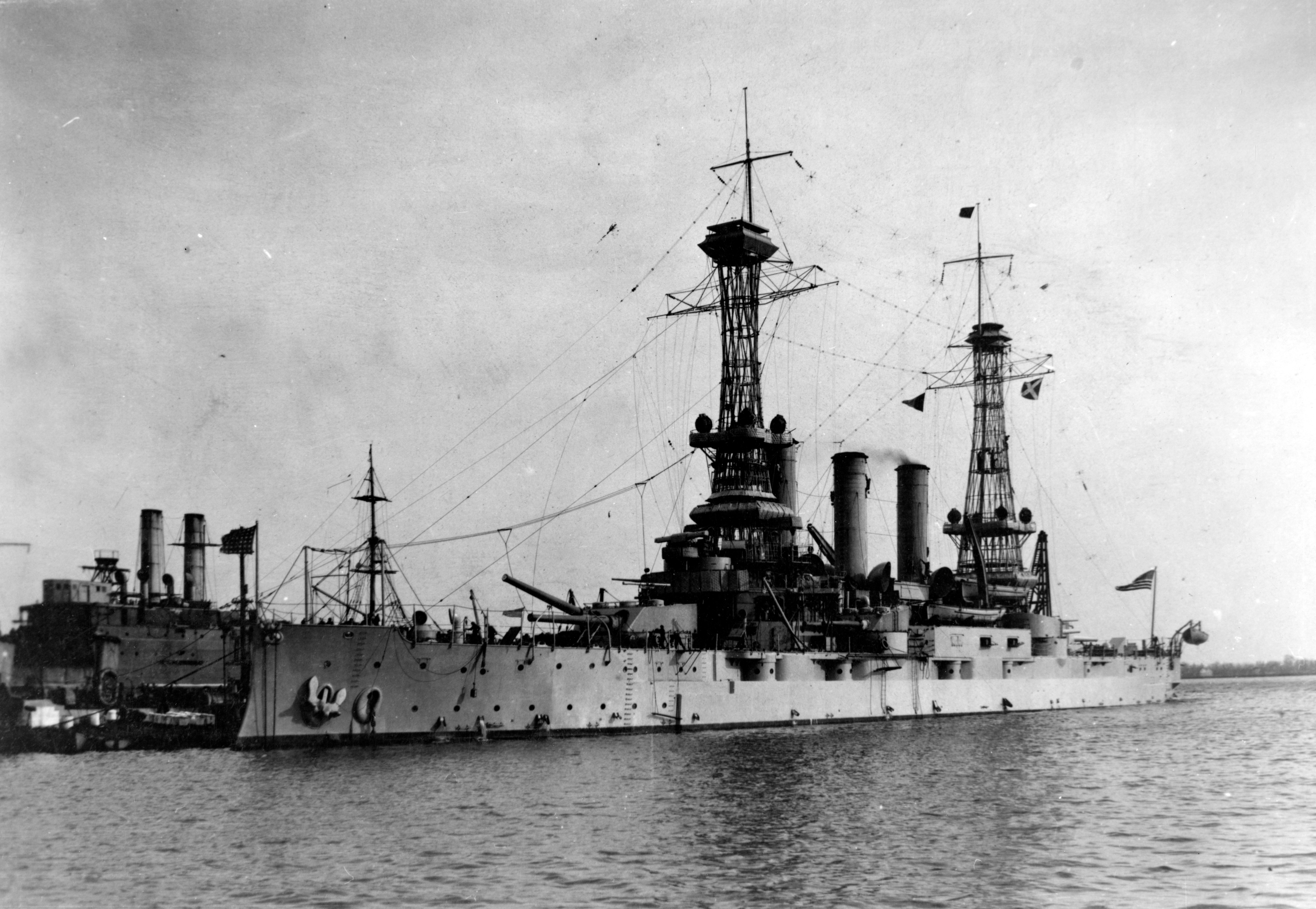
Minnesota at the Philadelphia Navy Yard, c. 1919

Minnesota returned to active service after the United States declared war on Germany on 6 April 1917, entering World War I. She was assigned to Division 4 of the Battleship Force, based at Tangier Sound in Chesapeake Bay. She spent the war as a training ship for gunners and engine room personnel. During this time, Vice Admiral Albert W. Grant, the commander of Battleship Force 1, instituted a program to reinforce the bulkheads of the ships under his command. This improved their ability to absorb underwater damage and remain afloat. On 29 September 1918, while cruising off Fenwick Island with the destroyer USS Israel, she struck a naval mine that had been laid by the U-boat U-117, which inflicted serious damage but caused no casualties. The explosion tore a gaping hole in the hull from frame 5 to frame 16, and from the keel to the bottom edge of the armor belt. The bow flooded, but the repaired bulkheads prevented the flooding from spreading. Reduced to a speed of 10 knots (19 km/h; 12 mph), Minnesota made it back to the Philadelphia Navy Yard where repairs were effected. The work lasted for five months, by which time Germany had signed the Armistice that ended the war.

On 11 March 1919, Minnesota returned to service with the Cruiser and Transport Force, making three trips to Brest, France to bring American soldiers back from the battlefields of Europe. In the course of the voyages, she brought back over 3,000 men; this duty ended on 23 July. The ship spent the next two years as a training ship for midshipmen from the US Naval Academy. She conducted two summer cruises in 1920 and 1921 before being decommissioned on 1 December 1921. She was stricken from the Naval Vessel Register the same day and was sold for scrap on 23 January 1924. Minnesota was thereafter broken up for scrap at the Philadelphia Navy Yard.

== See also ==
- List of naval ships named for Minnesota
