= Connecticut-class battleship =

Pre-dreadnought battleship class of the United States Navy

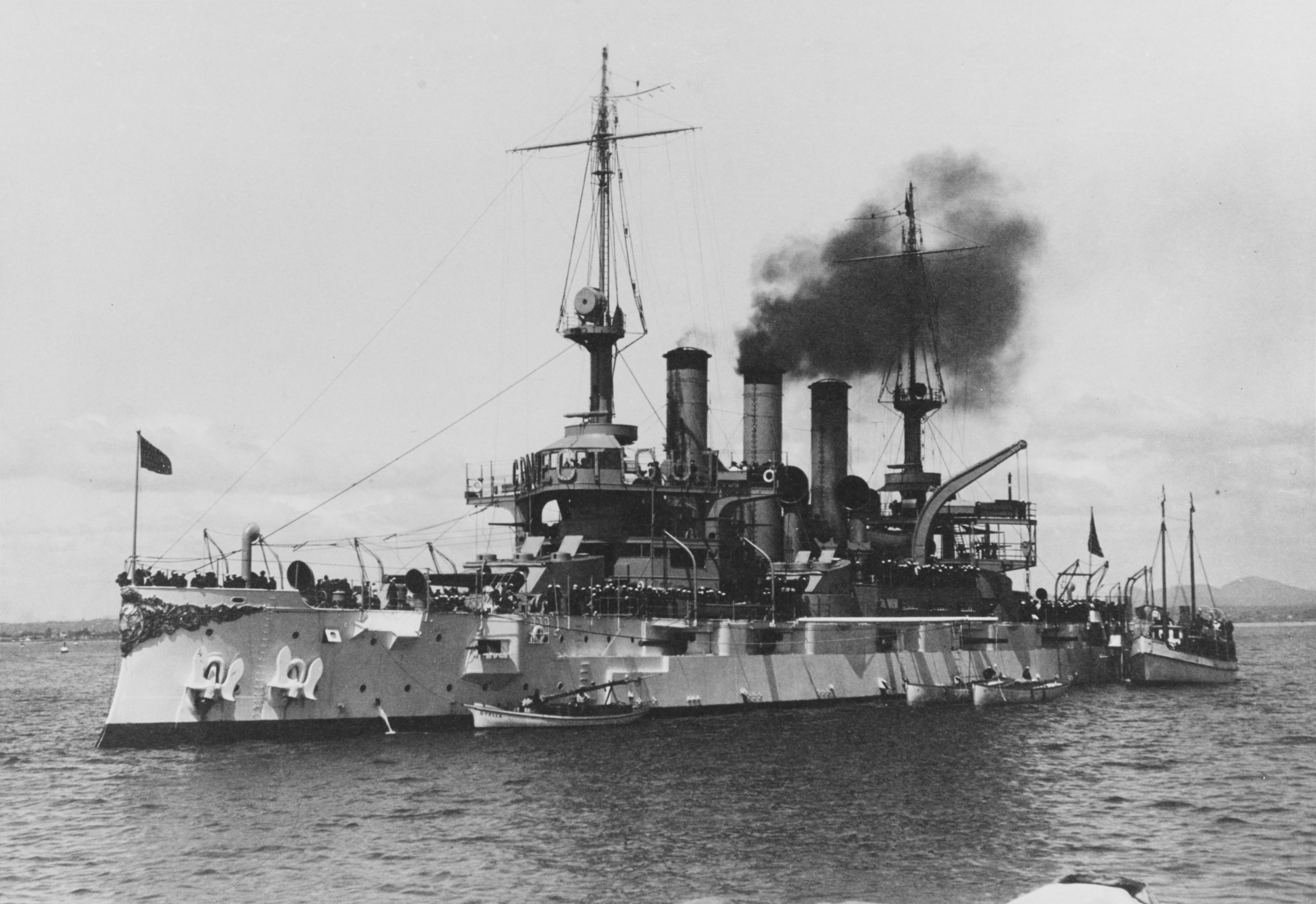
- USS Connecticut (BB-18)

Class overview
- Name: Connecticut-class battleship
- Builders: Newport News Shipbuilding, VA (2); New York Ship, NJ (2); Brooklyn Navy Yard, NY (1); Fore River Shipyard, MA (1)
- Operators: United States Navy
- Preceded by: Virginia class
- Succeeded by: Mississippi class
- Built: 1903–1908
- In commission: 1906–1923
- Completed: 6
- Retired: 6

General characteristics
- Type: Pre-dreadnought battleship
- Displacement: Normal: 16,000 long tons (16,257 t); Full load: 17,666 long tons (17,949 t)
- Length: 456 ft 4 in (139.09 m)
- Beam: 76 ft 10 in (23.42 m)
- Draft: 24 ft 6 in (7.47 m)
- Installed power: 12 Babcock & Wilcox boilers; 16,500 ihp (12,300 kW)
- Propulsion: 2 × triple-expansion steam engines; 2 × screw propellers
- Speed: 18 kn (21 mph; 33 km/h)
- Complement: 827 officers and men
- Armament: 4 × 12 in (305 mm)/45 cal Mark 5 guns; 8 × 8 in (203 mm)/45 caliber guns; 12 × 7 in (178 mm)/45 caliber guns; 20 × 3 in (76 mm)/50 caliber guns; 12 × 3-pounder (47 mm (1.9 in)) guns; 4 × 1-pounder (37 mm (1.5 in)) guns; 4 × 21 in (533 mm) torpedo tubes
- Armor: Belt: 6–11 in (152–279 mm); Barbettes: 6–10 in (152–254 mm); Casemates: 8–10 in (203–254 mm); Deck: 1.5–3 in (38–76 mm); Turret Main: 8–12 in (203–305 mm); Turret secondary: 7 in (178 mm); Conning tower: 9 in (229 mm)

The Connecticut class of pre-dreadnought battleships were the penultimate class of the type built for the United States Navy. The class comprised six ships: Connecticut, Louisiana, Vermont, Kansas, Minnesota, and New Hampshire, which were built between 1903 and 1908. The ships were armed with a mixed offensive battery of 12-inch (305 mm), 8-inch (203 mm), and 7-inch (178 mm) guns. This arrangement was rendered obsolete by the advent of all-big-gun battleships like the British HMS Dreadnought, which was completed before most of the Connecticuts entered service.

Nevertheless, the ships had active careers. The first five ships took part in the cruise of the Great White Fleet in 1907–1909—New Hampshire had not entered service. From 1909 onward, they served as the workhorses of the US Atlantic Fleet, conducting training exercises and showing the flag in Europe and Central America. As unrest broke out in several Central American countries in the 1910s, the ships became involved in police actions in the region. The most significant was the American intervention in the Mexican Revolution during the occupation of Veracruz in April 1914.

During the American participation in World War I, the Connecticut-class ships were used to train sailors for an expanding wartime fleet. In late 1918, they began to escort convoys to Europe, and in September that year, Minnesota was badly damaged by a mine laid by the German U-boat SM U-117. After the war, they were used to bring American soldiers back from France and later as training ships. The 1922 Washington Naval Treaty, which mandated major reductions in naval weapons, cut the ships' careers short. Within two years, all six ships had been sold for scrap.

== Design ==
The United States' victory in the Spanish–American War in 1898 had a dramatic impact on battleship design, as the question of the role of the fleet—namely, whether it should be focused on coastal defense or high seas operations—had been solved. The fleet's ability to conduct offensive operations overseas showed the necessity of a powerful fleet of battleships. As a result, the US Congress was willing to authorize much larger ships. Design work on what would become the Connecticut class began in 1901. The Secretary of the Navy submitted a request for a new battleship design on 6 March to the Board on Construction. Among the issues considered was the composition and placement of the secondary battery. The preceding design, the Virginia class, placed some of its secondary guns in fixed turrets atop the main battery turrets as a way to save weight. The Board disliked the arrangement, as some members argued that guns in casemates could be fired faster. Additionally, the Virginias had mounted a mixed secondary battery of 6-inch (152 mm) and 8-inch (203 mm) guns; the Bureau of Ordnance (BuOrd) had recently introduced a quick-firing 7-inch (178 mm) gun, which was more powerful than the 6-inch and fired faster than the 8-inch.

Line-drawing of the Connecticut class

The initial version of the Connecticut design, proposed by BuOrd, featured a secondary battery of twenty-four 7-inch guns with the same number of 3-inch (76 mm) guns for defense against torpedo boats. The armor layout was more comprehensive but thinner, and displacement rose to 15,560 long tons (15,810 t). BuOrd determined that a longer and finer hull shape, coupled with a small increase in engine power, would maintain the standard speed of 19 knots (35 km/h; 22 mph). The Bureau of Construction and Repair (C&R) proposed a ship more closely based on the Virginias, with the same two-story turrets and mixed 6- and 8-inch secondary battery, on a displacement of 15,860 long tons (16,110 t). This design featured only eight 3-inch guns, which was deemed wholly insufficient to defend the ship from small craft.

In November, the Board agreed to a compromise design that incorporated a secondary battery of eight 8-inch guns in four twin turrets amidships and twelve 7-inch guns in casemates. The decision to retain the 8 in guns was in large part due to American experiences in the Spanish–American War three years before. US Navy officers had been impressed with the performance of the gun at the Battle of Santiago de Cuba; despite scoring only 13 hits out of 309 shells fired, the gun had a flat trajectory and good range for its size. Armor protection was improved over the BuOrd design, with a thicker armored belt and casemate protection, albeit at the expense of thinner armor covering the barbettes that supported the gun turrets. The designers reasoned that since the barbettes were behind the belt and a transverse bulkhead, weight could be saved by reducing the level of direct protection.

The last four ships, starting with Vermont, received slightly improved armor protection, with the last vessel—New Hampshire—having further improvements. As a result, they are sometimes referred to as the Vermont class. The six Connecticut-class ships were the most powerful pre-dreadnought type battleship built by the US Navy, and they compared well with contemporary foreign designs. They were nevertheless rendered obsolescent almost immediately by the advent of the "all-big-gun" battleship epitomized by the British HMS Dreadnought. Two follow-on ships, the Mississippi class, were built at the same time to a design based on the Connecticuts but significantly reduced in size.

=== General characteristics and machinery ===
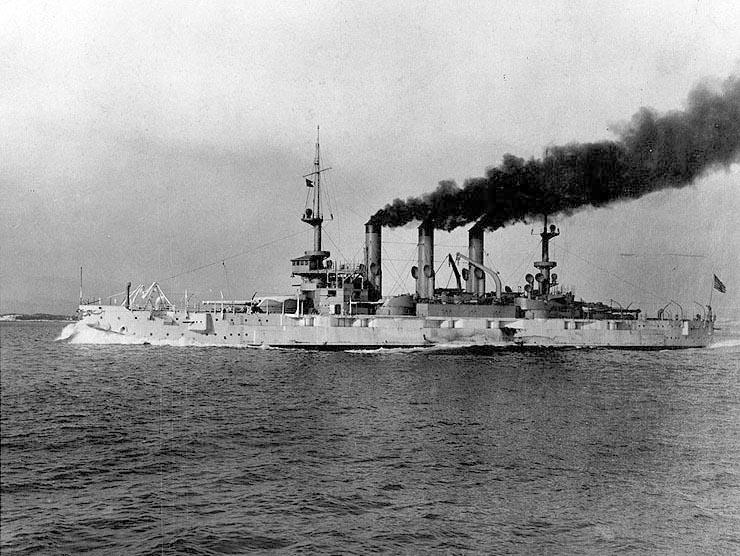
Kansas on speed trials

The Connecticut-class ships were 450 feet (140 m) long at the waterline and 456 ft 4 in (139.09 m) long overall. They had a beam of 76 ft 10 in (23.42 m) and a draft of 24 ft 6 in (7.47 m). Freeboard forward was 20 ft 6 in (6.25 m). They displaced 16,000 long tons (16,260 t) as designed and up to 17,666 long tons (17,949 t) at full load. The ships had a flush deck, and they were better sea boats than preceding designs, many of which had poor stability. The Connecticut class had a metacentric height of 4.62 feet (1.41 m). As built, the ships were fitted with two heavy military masts, but these were quickly replaced by lattice masts in 1909. They had a crew of 42 officers and 785 men.

The ships were powered by two-shaft triple-expansion steam engines, with steam provided by twelve coal-fired Babcock & Wilcox boilers. The engines were rated at 16,500 indicated horsepower (12,300 kW) and generated a top speed of 18 knots (33 km/h; 21 mph). The boilers were trunked into three closely spaced funnels amidships. The first five ships were equipped with eight 100-kilowatt (130 hp) electricity generators, while New Hampshire had four of these generators and two 200 kW (270 hp) units. All of the ships had a combined output of 800 kW (1,100 hp); this was the highest output in any American warship then built. Steering was controlled with a single rudder. The ships' turning radius was 620 yards (570 m) at a speed of 12 knots (22 km/h; 14 mph).

On trials, the ships exceeded their design speed slightly, with Minnesota being the fastest, at 18.85 knots (34.91 km/h; 21.69 mph). The ships carried 900 long tons (910 t) of coal normally, but additional spaces could be used for coal bunkers, with storage capacity ranging between 2,249 to 2,405 long tons (2,285 to 2,444 t) for each ship. At a cruising speed of 10 knots (19 km/h; 12 mph), the ships could steam for 6,620 nautical miles (12,260 km; 7,620 mi), though New Hampshire's engines were more efficient, allowing her to steam for 7,590 nautical miles (14,060 km; 8,730 mi) at the same speed.

=== Armament ===
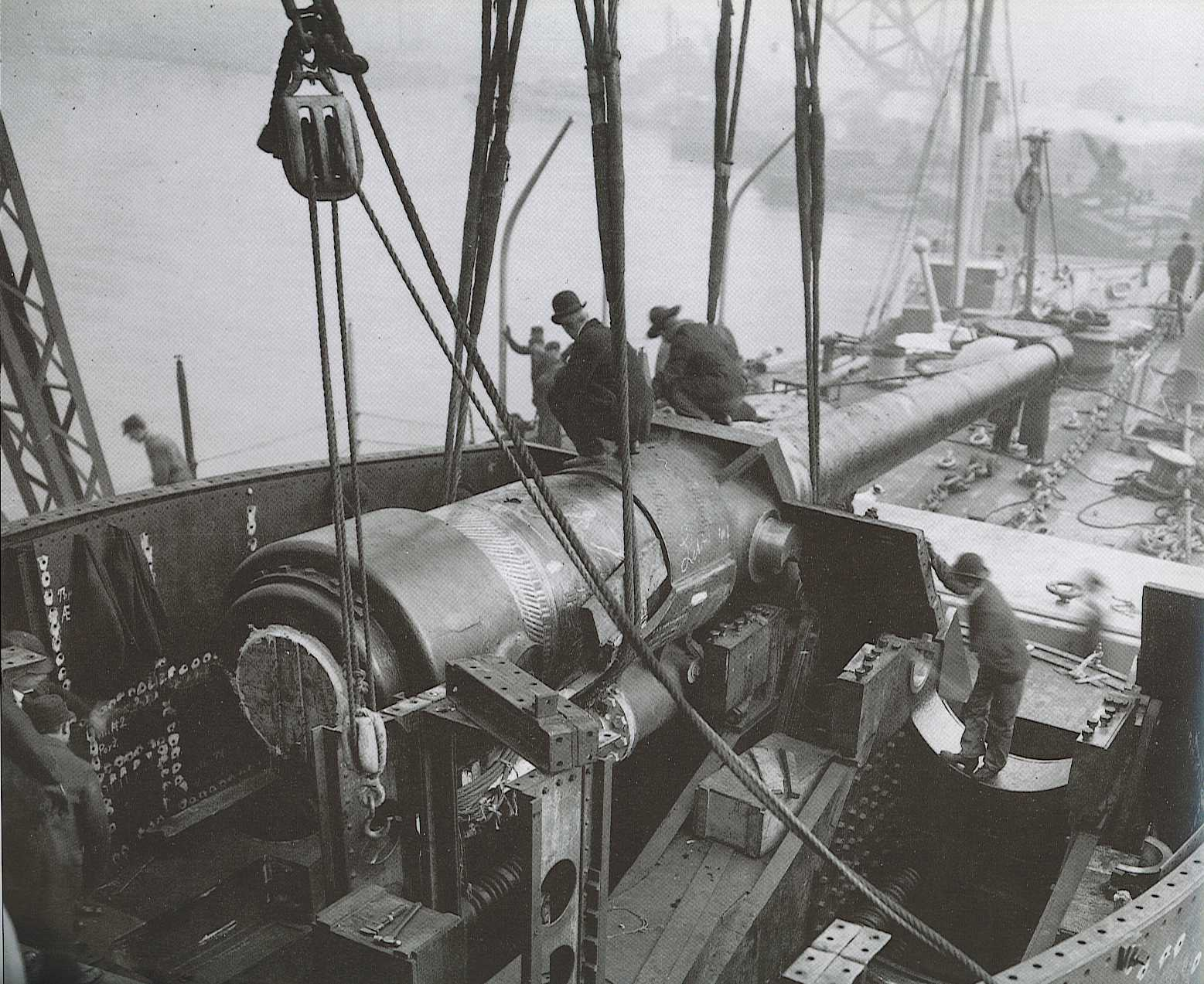
One of Connecticut's forward 12-inch guns being installed

The ship was armed with a main battery of four 12-inch (305 mm)/45 caliber Mark 5 (Note: /45 refers to the length of the gun in terms of calibers. A /45 gun is 45 times long as it is in bore diameter.) guns in two twin gun turrets on the centerline, one forward and aft, as was typical for battleships of the period. The guns fired a 870-pound (390 kg) shell at a muzzle velocity of 2,700 feet per second (820 m/s). The turrets were Mark VI mounts, which allowed for reloading at all angles of elevation. These mounts could elevate to 20 degrees and depress to -5 degrees. Each gun was supplied with sixty shells. New Hampshire's magazines were rearranged compared to her sisters, which allowed for her to carry 20 percent more 12- and 7-inch shells, though under normal conditions she carried the same load.

The secondary battery consisted of eight 8-inch (203 mm)/45 caliber guns and twelve 7-inch (178 mm)/45 caliber guns; this mixed battery proved to be problematic, as shell splashes from the two types could not be distinguished. The 8-inch guns were mounted in four twin Mark XII turrets amidships and the 7-inch guns were placed in casemates in the hull. The 8-inch guns were the Mark VI type, and they fired 260 lb (120 kg) shells at a muzzle velocity of 2,750 ft/s (840 m/s). The 7-inch Mark I guns fired a 165 lb (75 kg) shell at 2,700 ft/s. These guns were later removed during World War I and converted for use on tracked gun carriages in France. The outfit per gun was 100 shells for both types.

For close-range defense against torpedo boats, they carried twenty 3-inch (76 mm)/50 caliber guns mounted in casemates along the side of the hull and twelve 47 mm (1.9 in) 3-pounder guns. They also carried four 37 mm (1.5 in) 1-pounder guns. As was standard for capital ships of the period, the Connecticut class carried four 21-inch (533 mm) torpedo tubes, submerged in their hulls on the broadside. Each ship carried a total of 16 torpedoes. They were initially equipped with the Mark I Bliss-Leavitt design, but these were quickly replaced with Mark II, designed in 1905. The Mark II carried a 207-pound (94 kg) warhead and had a range of 3,500 yards (3,200 m) at a speed of 26 knots (48 km/h; 30 mph).

=== Armor ===
The first two ships' main armored belt was 11 in (279 mm) thick over the machinery spaces and reduced to 9 in (229 mm) abreast of the main battery turrets. This portion of the belt was 200 ft (61 m) long and 9 feet 3 inches (3 m) wide. On either end of the ship, the belt then thinned, first to 7 in (178 mm), then to 5 in (127 mm) and finally to 4 in (102 mm) at the bow and stern. The last four ships' belts were reduced to a uniform 9 in between the main battery, with no change to the ends. The armored deck was 1.5 in (38 mm) thick amidships, where it was partially protected by the belt and casemate armor. It had 3 in thick sloped sides, which connected to the bottom edge of the belt. The deck was increased to 3 in forward and aft, where it was directly exposed to shellfire, also with 3 in thick sloped sides. New Hampshire's belt was slightly shortened to permit a thicker deck over the magazines. Each ship's conning tower had 9 in thick sides and a 2 in (51 mm) thick roof.

The main battery gun turrets had 11 in thick faces, with 9 in thick sides and 2.5 in (64 mm) thick roofs. The supporting barbettes had the 10 in (254 mm) of armor plating, reduced to 6 in (152 mm). The secondary turrets had 6.5 in (165 mm) of frontal armor, with 6 in on the sides and 2 in on the roofs. Their barbettes were given 6 in of armor plating on the outboard sides and 4 in inboard. The casemates for the 7-inch guns were 7 in thick and below the gun ports, the casemates reduced slightly to 6 in. For the last four ships, the savings in weight gained by reducing the thickness of the belt were used to increase the lower casement armor to 7 in. Those for the 3-inch guns were 2 in thick. The 7-inch guns were divided by splinter bulkheads that were 1.5 to 2.5 inches (38 to 64 mm) thick to prevent one shell hit from disabling multiple guns.

== Construction ==
Construction data
Name	Builder	Laid down	Launched	Commissioned	Decommissioned (Note: See the Naval Vessel Register entries for New Hampshire, Vermont, Kansas, Minnesota, Louisiana, and Connecticut.)	Stricken
USS Connecticut (BB-18)	Brooklyn Navy Yard	10 March 1903	29 September 1904	29 September 1906	1 March 1923	10 November 1923
USS Louisiana (BB-19)	Newport News Shipbuilding Company	7 February 1903	27 August 1904	2 June 1906	10 October 1920	10 November 1923
USS Vermont (BB-20)	Fore River Shipyard	21 May 1904	31 August 1905	4 March 1907	30 June 1920	10 November 1923
USS Kansas (BB-21)	New York Shipbuilding Corporation	10 February 1904	12 August 1905	18 April 1907	16 December 1921	10 November 1923
USS Minnesota (BB-22)	Newport News Shipbuilding Company	27 October 1903	8 April 1905	9 March 1907	1 December 1921	10 November 1923
USS New Hampshire (BB-25)	New York Shipbuilding Corporation	1 May 1905	30 June 1906	19 March 1908	21 May 1921	10 November 1923

== Service history ==
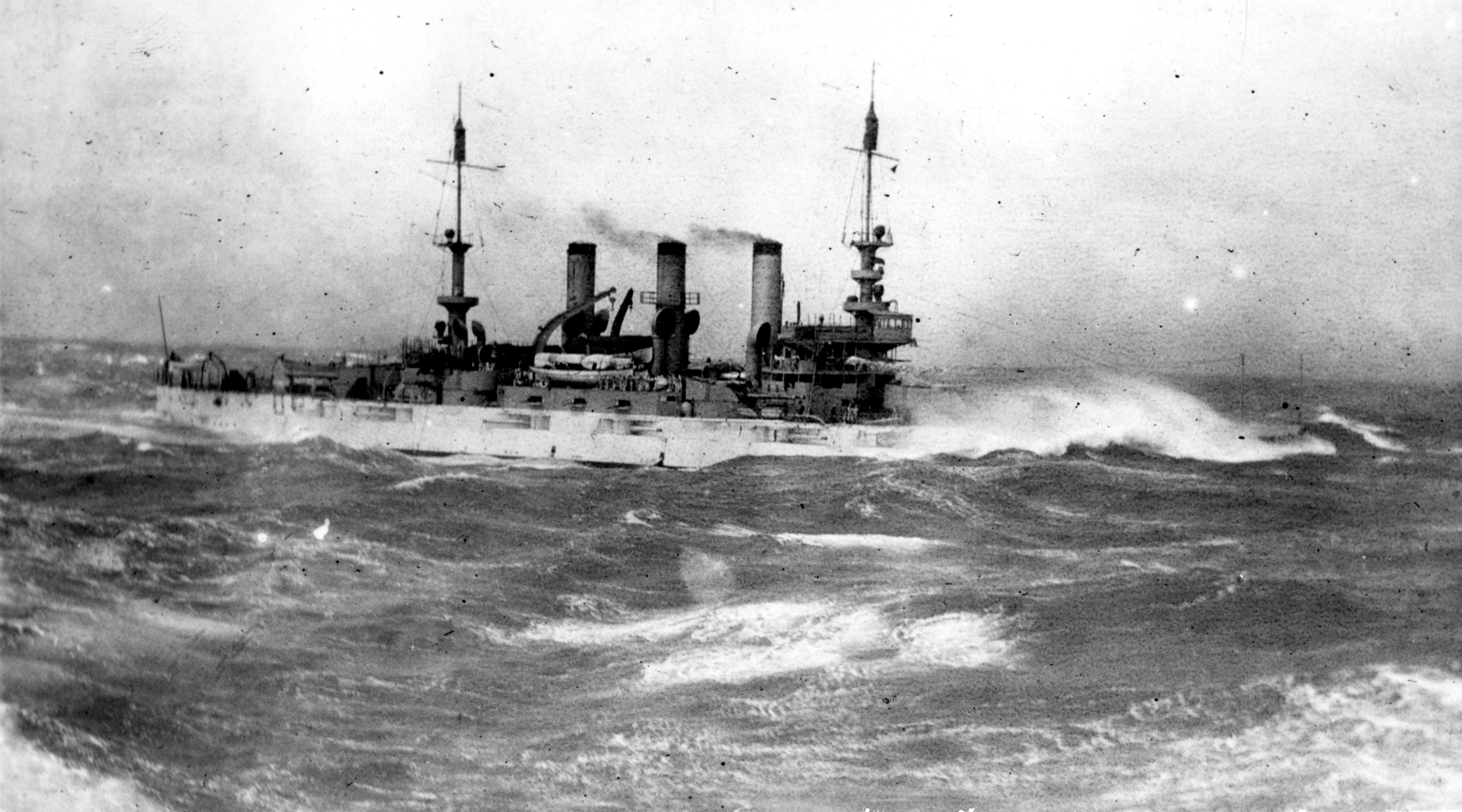
Vermont in heavy seas, probably during the cruise of the Great White Fleet

All six ships of the class served with the Atlantic Fleet for the duration of their careers. The first five ships took part in the cruise of the Great White Fleet in 1907–1909. The fleet left Hampton Roads on 16 December 1907 and steamed south, around South America and back north to the US west coast. The ships then crossed the Pacific and stopped in Australia, the Philippines, and Japan before continuing on through the Indian Ocean. They transited the Suez Canal and toured the Mediterranean before crossing the Atlantic, arriving bank in Hampton Roads on 22 February 1909. New Hampshire, which had not been completed in time to take part in the journey, met the fleet there during a naval review with President Theodore Roosevelt.

The ships then began a peacetime training routine off the east coast of the United States and the Caribbean, including gunnery training off the Virginia Capes, training cruises in the Atlantic, and winter exercises in Cuban waters. In late 1909, all six ships crossed the Atlantic to visit British and French ports. Louisiana and Kansas made another trip to Europe in early 1911. As political unrest began to erupt in several Central American countries in the 1910s, the ships became increasingly active in the region. All six ships became involved in the Mexican Revolution, including the occupation of Veracruz in April 1914; Vermont and New Hampshire were among the ships that contributed landing parties to the initial occupation of the city. Several men from the two ships were awarded the Medal of Honor during the action. (Note: See the Dictionary of American Naval Fighting Ships entries for New Hampshire, Vermont, Kansas, Minnesota, Louisiana, and Connecticut.)

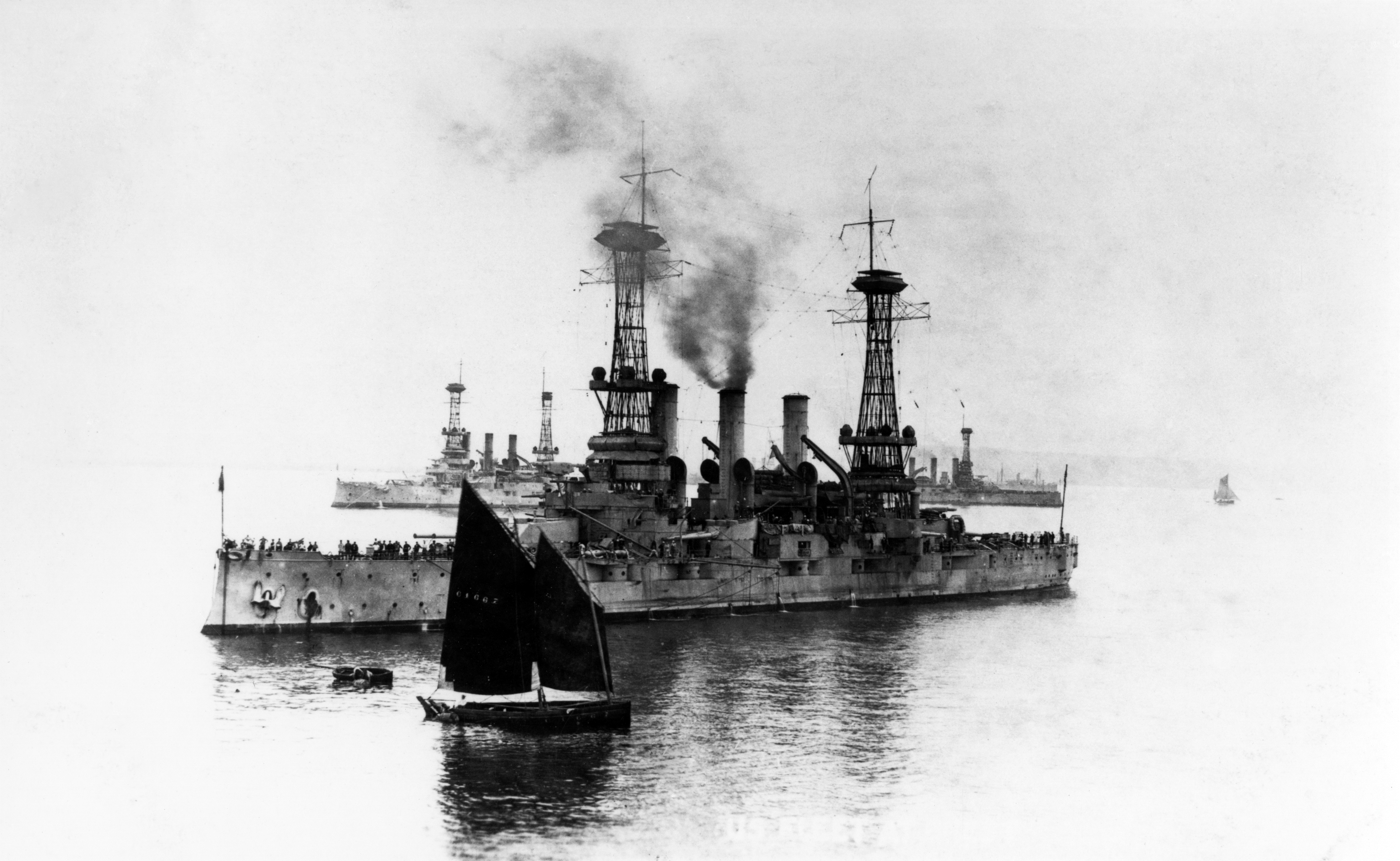
Kansas (center) in Brest, France in 1919; New Hampshire (left) and Connecticut (right) are visible in the distance

In July 1914, World War I broke out in Europe; the United States remained neutral for the first three years of the war. Tensions with Germany came to a head in early 1917 following the German unrestricted submarine warfare campaign, which sank several American merchant ships in European waters. On 6 April 1917, the United States declared war on Germany. The Connecticut-class ships initially were used for training gunners and engine room personnel that would be necessary for the rapidly expanding wartime fleet. In June 1918, New Hampshire and Louisiana were involved in a serious gunnery accident, where gunners aboard the former accidentally hit the latter, killing one and injuring several other men. The following month, Louisiana was used to test Arthur Pollen's Argo Clock, the first fire control system to use an analog computer to calculate firing solutions.

From late 1918, the ships were used to escort convoys part-way across the Atlantic. In late September, Minnesota struck a naval mine laid by the German U-boat U-117, causing serious damage that kept her out of service for five months. Convoy duty was cut short by the German surrender in November; thereafter, the Connecticuts were used to ferry American soldiers back from the battlefields of France. This work was completed by mid-1919. The ships briefly operated as training ships in the early 1920s, though under the terms of the Washington Naval Treaty, they were all sold for scrap by 1924 and broken up.
