= USS New Hampshire (BB-25) =

Pre-dreadnought battleship of the United States Navy

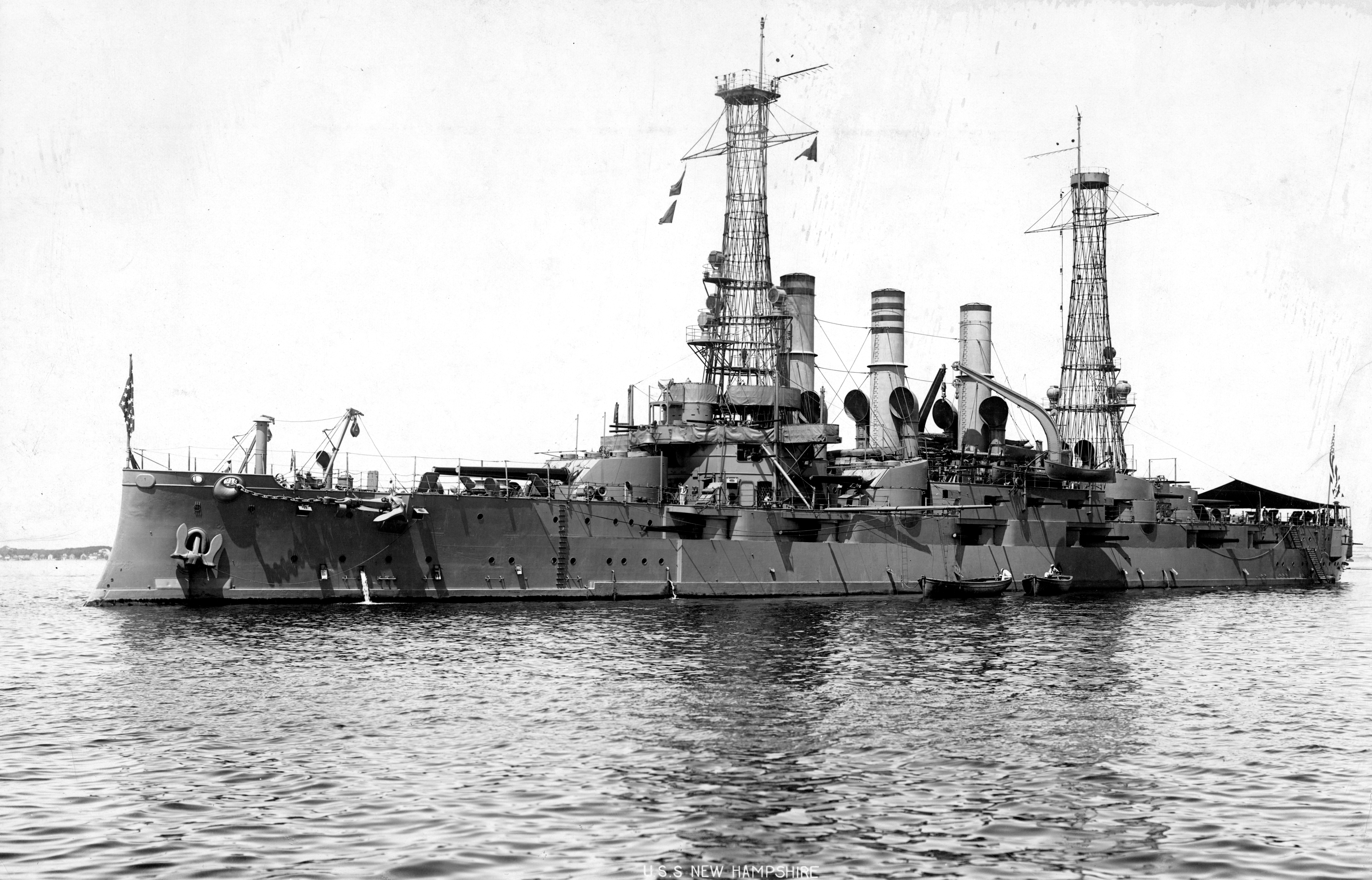
- USS New Hampshire in 1910

History

United States
- Name: New Hampshire
- Namesake: New Hampshire
- Ordered: 27 April 1904
- Builder: New York Shipbuilding Corporation
- Laid down: 1 May 1905
- Launched: 30 June 1906
- Commissioned: 19 March 1908
- Decommissioned: 21 May 1921
- Stricken: 10 November 1923
- Fate: Broken up, 1923

General characteristics
- Class & type: Connecticut-class battleship
- Displacement: Normal: 16,000 long tons (16,000 t); Full load: 17,666 long tons (17,949 t)
- Length: 456 ft 4 in (139.09 m)
- Beam: 76 ft 10 in (23.42 m)
- Draft: 24 ft 6 in (7.47 m)
- Installed power: 12 Babcock & Wilcox boilers; 16,500 ihp (12,300 kW)
- Propulsion: 2 × triple-expansion steam engines; 2 × screw propellers
- Speed: 18 kn (21 mph; 33 km/h)
- Complement: 827 officers and men
- Armament: 4 × 12 in (305 mm)/45 caliber Mark 5 guns; 8 × 8 in (203 mm)/45 caliber guns; 12 × 7 in (178 mm)/45 caliber guns; 20 × 3 in (76 mm)/50 caliber guns; 2 × 1-pounder guns; 4 × 21 inch (533 mm) torpedo tubes
- Armor: Belt: 7–9 in (178–229 mm); Barbettes: 6–11 in (152–279 mm); Turret Main: 8–12 in (203–305 mm); Turret secondary: 7 in (178 mm); Conning tower: 9 in (229 mm)

USS New Hampshire (hull number BB-25) was the sixth and final Connecticut-class pre-dreadnought battleship, the last vessel of that type built for the United States Navy. Like most contemporary battleships, she was armed with an offensive armament that consisted of four large-caliber 12-inch (305 mm) guns and several medium-caliber 7 and 8-inch (178 and 203 mm) guns. The ship was laid down in May 1905, launched in June 1906, and commissioned in March 1908, a little over a year after the revolutionary all-big-gun HMS Dreadnought rendered ships like New Hampshire obsolescent.

Despite being rapidly surpassed by new American dreadnoughts, New Hampshire had an active career. She made two trips to Europe in 1910 and 1911, and she sank the old battleship USS Texas, which had been converted into a target ship. New Hampshire was particularly active in the Caribbean during this period, as several countries, including Haiti, the Dominican Republic, and Mexico devolved into internal political conflicts. These actions included the United States occupation of Veracruz, during which the ship's commander was awarded the Medal of Honor.

After the United States entered World War I in April 1917, the ship was used primarily to train gunners and engine room personnel, as the US Navy had expanded significantly to combat the German U-boat campaign. She escorted convoys in late 1918, and after the war ended she took part in the effort to bring American soldiers back from France. New Hampshire remained in service for only a few years after the war, as the 1922 Washington Naval Treaty significantly reduced the navies of the signatories; as a result, the ship was sold for scrap in November 1923.

== Design ==
The Connecticut class followed the Virginia-class battleships, but corrected some of the most significant deficiencies in the earlier design, most notably the superposed arrangement of the main and some of the secondary guns. A heavier tertiary battery of 7 in (178 mm) guns replaced the 6 in (152 mm) guns that had been used on all previous US designs. Despite the improvements, the ships were rendered obsolescent by the revolutionary British battleship HMS Dreadnought, completed before most of the members of the Connecticut class.

Line-drawing of the Connecticut class

New Hampshire was 456 ft 4 in (139 m) long overall and had a beam of 76 ft 10 in (23 m) and a draft of 24 ft 6 in (7 m). She displaced 16,000 long tons (16,260 t) as designed and up to 17,666 long tons (17,949 t) at full load. The ship was powered by two-shaft triple-expansion steam engines rated at 16,500 indicated horsepower (12,300 kW), with steam provided by twelve coal-fired Babcock & Wilcox boilers ducted into three funnels. The propulsion system generated a top speed of 18 knots (33 km/h; 21 mph). As built, she was fitted with heavy military masts, but these were quickly replaced by lattice masts in 1909. She had a crew of 827 officers and men, though this increased to 881 and later to 896.

The ship was armed with a main battery of four 12 inch /45 Mark 5 (Note: /45 refers to the length of the gun in terms of calibers. A /45 gun is 45 times long as it is in bore diameter.) guns in two twin gun turrets on the centerline, one forward and aft. The secondary battery consisted of eight 8-inch (203 mm) /45 guns and twelve 7-inch (178 mm) /45 guns. The 8-inch guns were mounted in four twin turrets amidships and the 7-inch guns were placed in casemates in the hull. For close-range defense against torpedo boats, she carried twenty 3-inch (76 mm) /50 guns mounted in casemates along the side of the hull. She also carried two 37 mm (1.5 in) 1-pounder guns. As was standard for capital ships of the period, New Hampshire carried four 21 inch (533 mm) torpedo tubes, submerged in her hull on the broadside.

New Hampshire's main armored belt was 9 in (229 mm) thick over the magazines and the propulsion machinery spaces and 7 in (178 mm) elsewhere. The main battery gun turrets had 12-inch (305 mm) thick faces, and the supporting barbettes had 10 in (254 mm) of armor plating. The secondary turrets had 7 in of frontal armor. The conning tower had 9 in (229 mm) thick sides.

== Service history ==
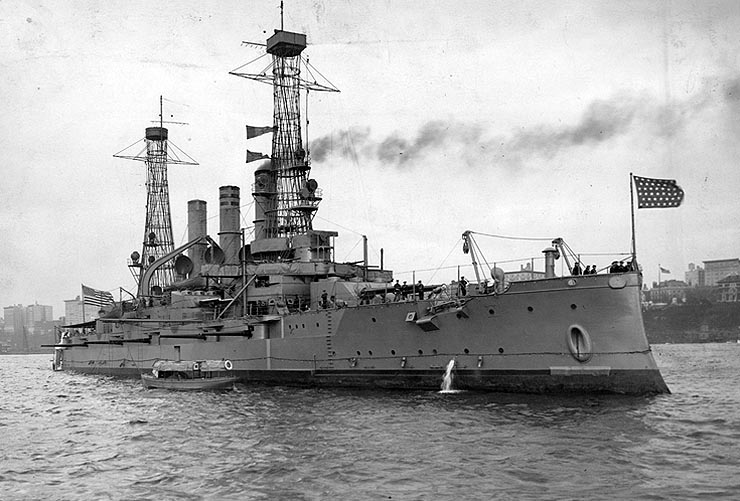
New Hampshire in New York c. 1911

New Hampshire was laid down on 1 May 1905 at the New York Shipbuilding Corporation in Camden, New Jersey. She was launched on 30 June 1906. The ship was commissioned into the US Navy on 19 March 1908; her first commander was Captain Cameron Winslow. After completing final fitting-out work, New Hampshire transported a Marine Expeditionary Regiment to Colón, Panama on 20 June, arriving six days later. She then made a series of visits to ports on the eastern coast of North America, including Portsmouth, New York, and Bridgeport, along with a stop in the Canadian province of Quebec. The ship was then overhauled in New York, followed by training exercises in the Caribbean Sea. On 22 February 1909, she participated in a Naval Review for President Theodore Roosevelt to greet the return of the Great White Fleet in Hampton Roads, Virginia. During this period, Ernest King, later the Chief of Naval Operations during World War II, served aboard the ship in the engine room.

New Hampshire conducted training exercises in the Atlantic and Caribbean through late 1910. On 1 November that year, she steamed out of Hampton Roads with the Second Battleship Division for a visit to Europe. There, the ships stopped in Cherbourg, France and Weymouth, the United Kingdom. The Division departed Weymouth on 30 December and returned to the Caribbean for training, before proceeding to Norfolk on 10 March 1911. On 21–22 March, New Hampshire conducted gunnery training with the target ship San Marcos—the old battleship Texas—in Tangier Sound in Chesapeake Bay. Over the course of the two days of firing, New Hampshire inflicted severe damage to the old ship, sinking her in shallow water. A cursory inspection of the wreck noted that the interior of the ship above the waterline was destroyed and that she had been holed multiple times below the waterline.

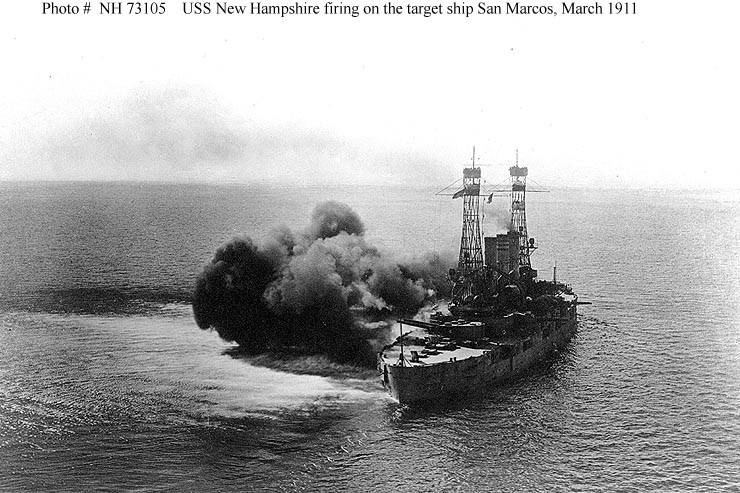
Firing a broadside at San Marcos in March 1911

She then prepared for another trip to Europe. This time the ships cruised into the Baltic Sea, stopping in several ports in Germany, Russia, and Scandinavia, before returning to New England on 13 July. New Hampshire spent the next three years training midshipmen on summer cruises and patrolling the Caribbean. In December 1912, she steamed off the island of Hispaniola during unrest in both Haiti and the Dominican Republic. From 14 June to 29 December 1913, she patrolled the Caribbean coast of Mexico during the Mexican Revolution. The following year, she took part in the occupation of Veracruz in Mexico, starting on 15 April. During the operations, the ship's commander, Edwin Anderson, Jr., led a landing party that came under fire from the Heroica Escuela Naval Militar academy (Heroic Naval Military School), though gunfire from cruisers in the harbor silenced the Mexican snipers. Anderson and several others were awarded the Medal of Honor for the action. New Hampshire departed the area on 21 April for an overhaul in Norfolk. Exercises off the east coast of the United States followed before the ship returned to Veracruz in August 1915.

=== World War I ===
The ship was back in Norfolk on 30 September and remained in American waters late 1916. On 2 December, she steamed to Santo Domingo, the capital of the Dominican Republic, where the United States had instituted a military government under Rear Admiral Harry Knapp in an attempt to put an end to the political instability there. New Hampshire's captain was involved in the government while the ship was in the country. In February 1917, she returned to Norfolk for an overhaul; this work was still ongoing when the United States declared war on Germany on 6 April. Over the course of the next eighteen months, the ship was occupied with training gunners and engine room personnel for the rapidly expanding wartime fleet. During training on 1 June 1918, the crews for three of the 7-inch guns aboard New Hampshire accidentally began firing at one of the submarine chasers present; they fired several salvos before they received the order to cease fire. One of the shells struck the nearby battleship USS Louisiana, killing one man and wounding several more. While the ships stopped to regain control of the situation, a lookout reported a periscope from a U-boat; New Hampshire and the battleship USS Ohio opened fire with their 6-inch guns to no effect. The submarine chasers could not find a U-boat in the area.

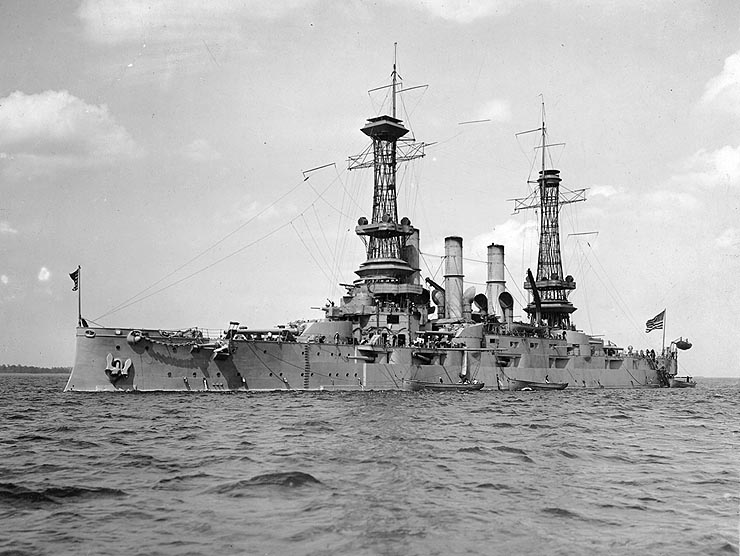
New Hampshire in the Hudson River in December 1918

In September 1918, she was assigned to convoy escort duty, with the first such mission on 6 September. The ship departed with the battleship USS Kansas and the dreadnought USS South Carolina to protect a fast HX troopship convoy. On 16 September, the three battleships left the convoy in the Atlantic and steamed back to the United States, while other escorts brought the convoy into port. On the 17th, South Carolina's starboard propeller fell off, which forced her to reduce speed to 11 knots (20 km/h; 13 mph) using only the port shaft. New Hampshire and Kansas remained with South Carolina to escort her back to port. This duty did not last long, as the Germans signed the Armistice that ended the war on 11 November. On 24 December, New Hampshire began the first of four trips to bring soldiers back from the battlefields of Europe. On the first trip, she steamed with Louisiana, the two ships arriving in Brest, France on 5 January 1919. Between the two of them, they returned 2,169 men, including eight civilians.

=== Postwar career ===
By 1919, the ship had had all of her 7-inch guns and eight of the 3-inch guns removed, and a pair of 3-inch anti-aircraft guns had been installed. On 22 June 1919, the ship went into drydock in Philadelphia for an overhaul. A year later, on 5 June 1920, she began a training cruise for midshipmen to the Pacific Ocean via the Panama Canal. The cruise took the ship to Hawaii and several cities on the western coast of the United States. She was back in Philadelphia by 11 September. From 18 October to 12 January 1921, New Hampshire served as the flagship for a mission to Haiti. On 25 January she crossed the Atlantic to Europe for the final time to carry the remains of August Ekengren, the Swedish envoy to the United States. She arrived in Stockholm on 14 February; on the return voyage, she also stopped in Kiel, Germany, and Gravesend, United Kingdom. The ship reached Philadelphia on 24 March, where she was decommissioned on 21 May. According to the terms of the Washington Naval Treaty, New Hampshire was sold on 1 November 1923 and subsequently broken up for scrap.

Two 7-inch guns from New Hampshire were later installed as coastal artillery guns on Oahu after the attack on Pearl Harbor during World War II. These guns are currently displayed at Battery Randolph in Honolulu.
