= Jersey (disambiguation) =

Jersey is an island in the English Channel.

Jersey may also refer to:

== Common meanings ==
- Jersey (knitted clothing), a garment
- Jersey (fabric), a knit
- Jersey cattle

== Places in the United States ==
=== Geography ===
- New Jersey, a state named after and sometimes referred to as Jersey
  - Jersey City, New Jersey, a city
  - Jersey Shore, a region of that state
- Jersey, Arkansas, an unincorporated community
- Jersey, Georgia, a town
- Jersey, Ohio, an unincorporated community
- Jersey Village, Texas, a city
- Jersey, Virginia, an unincorporated community
- Jersey County, Illinois, a county
- Jersey Island (California), an island
- Jersey Township, Jersey County, Illinois, a township
- Jersey Township, Licking County, Ohio, a township
- Jersey Shore, Pennsylvania, an inland borough

=== Bridges ===
- Jersey Bridge (Cherrytree Township, Pennsylvania), listed on the NRHP in Venango County (as "Bridge in Cherrytree Township")
- Jersey Bridge, in Downieville, California, listed on the National Register of Historic Places (NRHP) in Sierra County

== People ==
- Boston Jersey (born 1736 or 1737), enslaved Royal Navy sailor
- Paul de Jersey (born 1948), Governor of Queensland, Australia, jurist and former Chief Justice of the Supreme Court of Queensland
- Earl of Jersey, a title in the Peerage of England and a list of bearers of the title
- Lady Jersey (disambiguation), countesses of Jersey

== Arts, entertainment, and media ==
- Jersey (band), a musical group
- Jersey (EP), an EP by Bella Thorne
- The Jersey, a 1999 television series
- Jersey (2019 film), a Telugu film
- Jersey (2022 film), a Hindi film
- Jersey Shore (TV series), US comedy TV show
- Jersey Boys, a 2005 Broadway musical

== Military ==
- Battle of Jersey, a 1781 attempt to capture the island during the American Revolutionary War
- HMS Jersey, several Royal Navy ships

== Sports ==
- Jersey Open, a European Tour golf tournament from 1978 to 1995
- Jersey Stakes, Group 3 flat horse race in Great Britain
- Team jersey

== Other uses ==
- Jersey barrier, a traffic control device
- Project Jersey, a software framework for developing web services in Java
