= Hampstead, Virginia =

Hampstead, Virginia may refer to:

- Hampstead (Tunstall, Virginia), a historic plantation house located near Tunstall in New Kent County
  - Hampstead, New Kent County, Virginia, an unincorporated settlement named for the plantation house
- Hampstead, King George County, Virginia, an unincorporated settlement named after Hampstead in England
