= Ralph Bunche High School =

Historic high school in Virginia, US

- U.S. National Register of Historic Places
- Virginia Landmarks Register
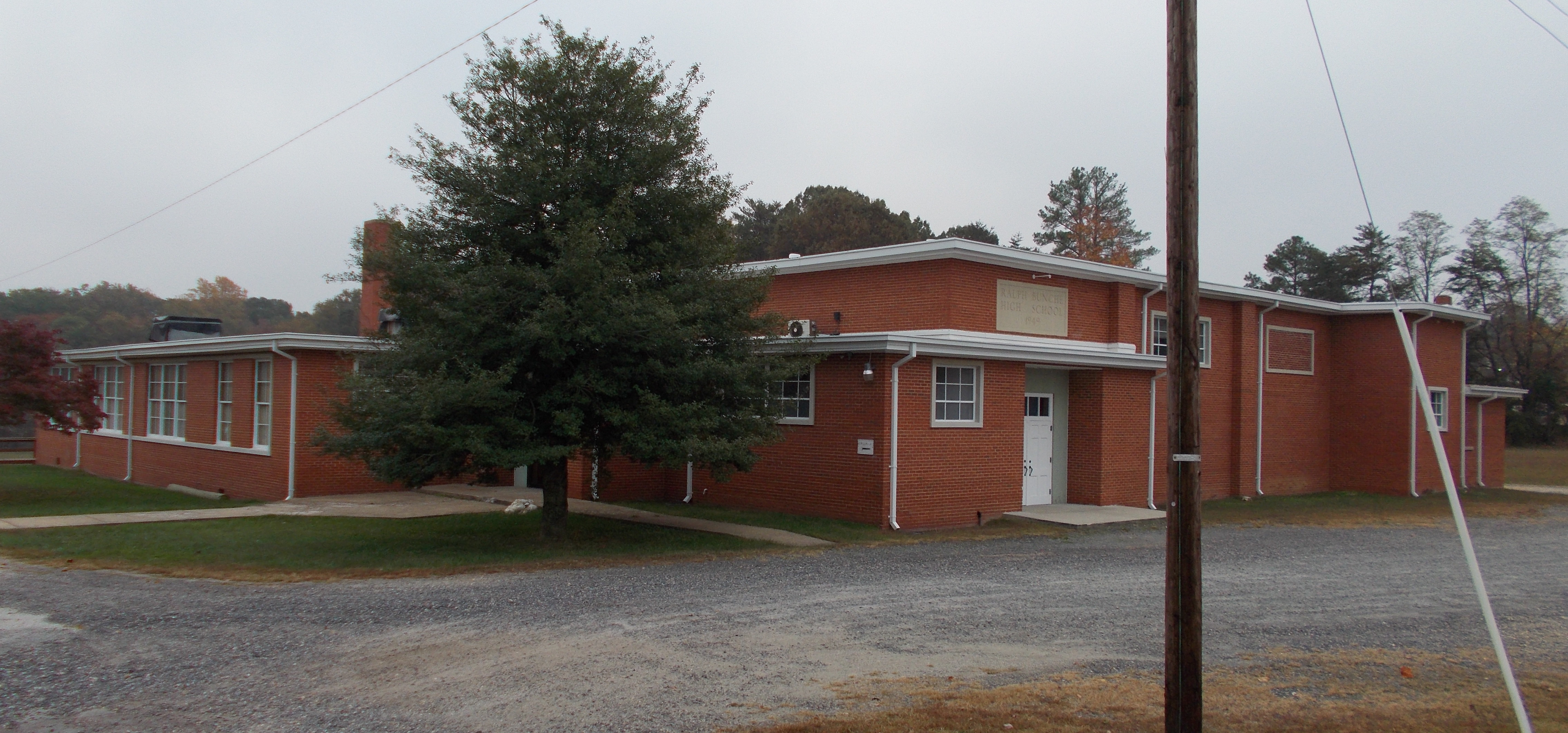
- Ralph Bunche High School, October 2012
- Location: 10139 James Madison Hwy., King George, Virginia
- Coordinates: 38°16′25″N 77°8′13″W
- Area: 7.8 acres (3.2 ha)
- Built: 1949
- Architect: Mayo, Samuel N.; Howard-Mitchell Construction Co.
- Architectural style: Modern Movement
- NRHP reference No.: 06000353
- VLR No.: 048-5007

Significant dates
- Added to NRHP: May 01, 2006
- Designated VLR: March 8, 2006

Ralph Bunche High School was a school constructed in 1949 as a result of Civil Action 631 to provide "separate but equal" education for African-American students in King George County, Virginia. The school operated until 1968 when King George High School was completed and the county's schools integrated. The school was named for Ralph Bunche, an African-American educator, diplomat and Nobel Prize winner.

== Architecture ==
The building continued to be used for various school uses until 1998, including at times as an elementary school, for several specialized programs, including secondary and pre-school, and for School Board administrative offices and some School Board meetings. Ralphe Bunche High School alumni formed a preservation committee in 1998 after plans to demolish the building were discussed. In August of that year, the King George County School Board approved a resolution to preserve the building allowing it to be registered as a historical site. In May 2007, the Ralph Bunche Alumni Association unveiled a commemorative plaque to be placed on the building.

The building is currently on the National Register of Historic Places. In 2016, efforts were underway to turn the old school building into the Ralph Bunche Museum and Cultural Centre.

== School ==
Ralph Bunche High School

Information
- Type: Public, segregated
- Opened: 1949
- Closed: 1968
- Last updated: 30 December 2017

=== Notable alumni ===
- Al Bumbry, former Major League Baseball outfielder who played for the Baltimore Orioles and San Diego Padres

== See also ==
- King George High School
