= Rollins Fork, Virginia =

Unincorporated community in Virginia, United States

- Unincorporated community
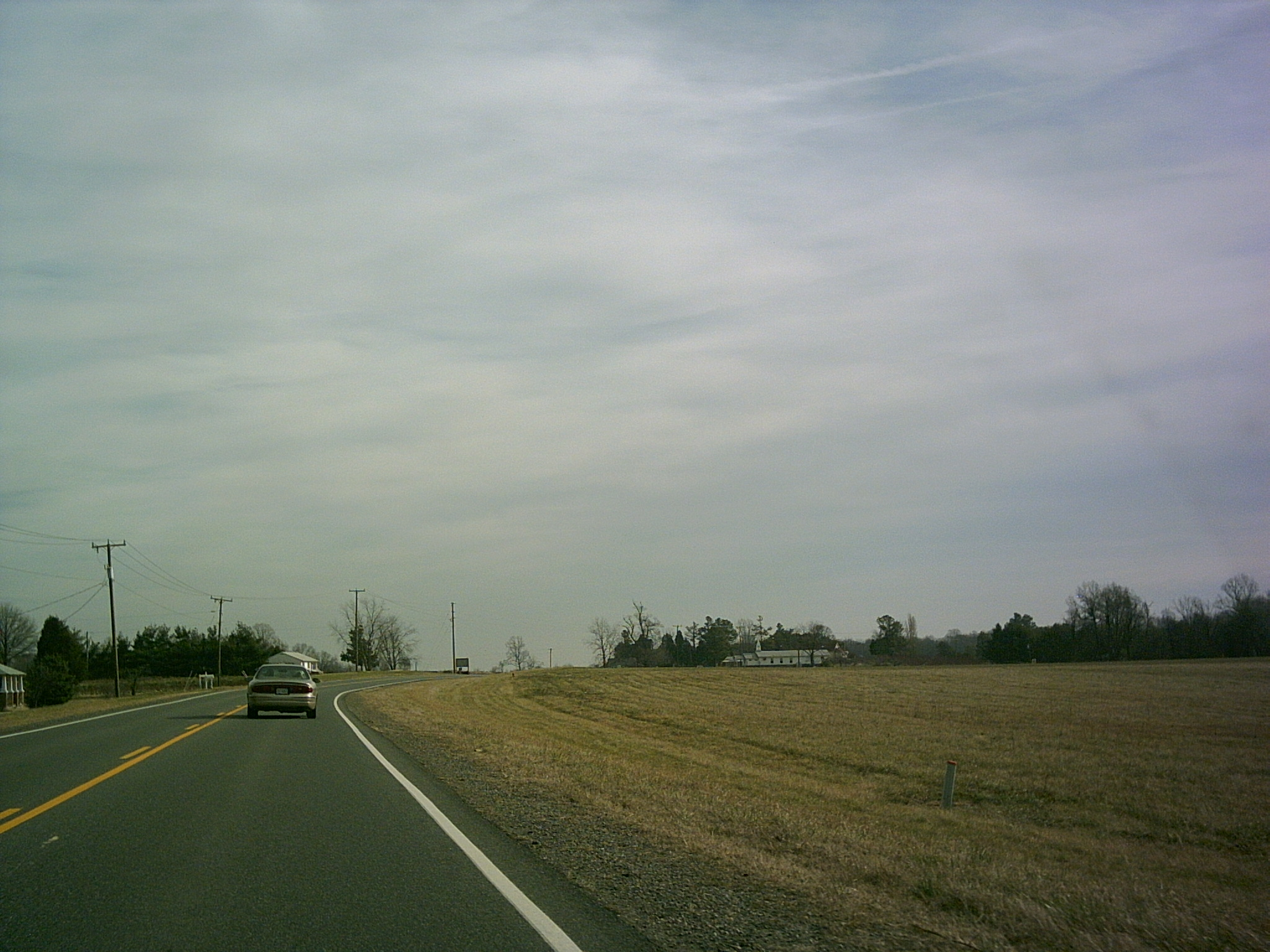
- Farmland at Rollins Fork

- Location within Virginia and the United States Rollins Fork (the United States)
- Coordinates: 38°11′05″N 77°03′44″W
- Country: United States
- State: Virginia
- County: King George
- Time zone: UTC−5 (Eastern (EST))
  - Summer (DST): UTC−4 (EDT)
- ZIP code: 22544

Rollins Fork is an unincorporated community in King George County, Virginia, United States. The community is located along Virginia State Route 3, east of Index.
