= Calvin T. Durgin =

U.S. Navy vice admiral

Calvin Thornton Durgin
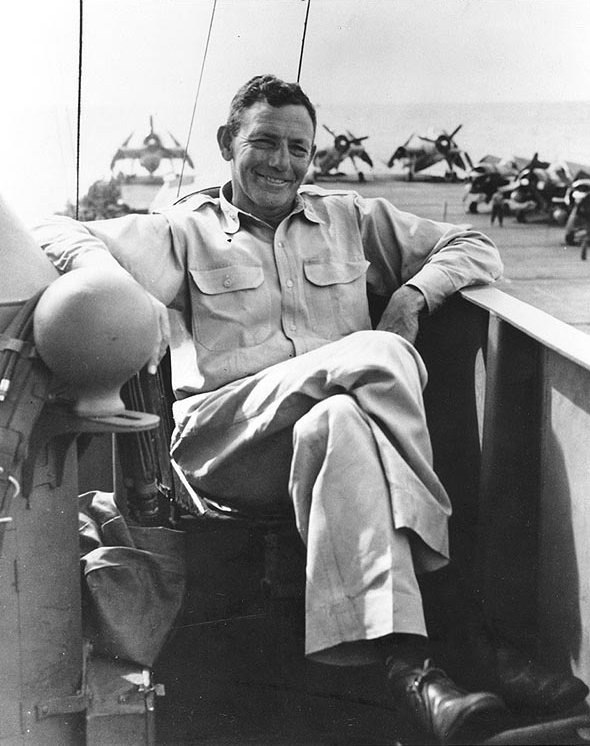
- Born: January 7, 1893; Palmyra, New Jersey, U.S.
- Died: March 25, 1965 (aged 72); New York City, New York, U.S.
- Military career
- Allegiance: United States of America
- Branch: United States Navy
- Service years: 1916–1951
- Rank: Vice Admiral
- Commands: USS Ranger (CV-4); First Fleet
- Conflicts: World War I World War II; Korean War
- Awards: Navy DSM; Legion of Merit (3)

Calvin Thornton Durgin (January 7, 1893 – March 25, 1965) was a vice admiral who served in the U.S. Navy from 1916 until 1951. He served as Deputy Chief of Naval Operations for Air in 1949.

== Biography ==
Calvin T. Durgin was born in Palmyra, New Jersey, on January 7, 1893. He graduated from the U.S. Naval Academy at Annapolis and was commissioned an ensign on June 3, 1916. As a young officer he served aboard destroyers and battleships in World War I.

In 1920, he became a naval aviator and did graduate work in aeronautical engineering at M.I.T. before receiving a master's degree there in 1924. Durgin became known as a naval expert in air combat and served in the Mediterranean, Atlantic and Pacific during World War II.

During the war, he commanded the aircraft carrier Ranger during an assault on Morocco and commanded a carrier group during the 1944 invasion of southern France.

In the Pacific, he commanded a fleet of escort carrier groups. These groups provided support for landings in the Philippines, Iwo Jima, and Okinawa.

In 1949, he became the Deputy Chief of Naval Operations for Air and in 1950 became the commander of the United States' First Pacific Fleet. His last assignment, on active duty, was as president of the Board of Inspection and Survey.

In 1951, Durgin retired from active service and upon retirement, was promoted to the rank of vice admiral. At this time, he took the position as president of SUNY Maritime College, where he served until 1959 when he retired to a farm at Dogue, Virginia.

Durgin died on March 25, 1965, of a heart attack while attending the Metropolitan Opera.

Durgin's papers are kept in the archives of the Washington Navy Yard, and the Stephen B. Luce Library of Maritime College.

== Sources ==
- "Calvin T. Durgin, Retired Admiral," New York Times, March 26, 1965.
- Papers of Vice Admiral Calvin T. Durgin, 1942–1951.
