= John J. Ballentine =

American Navy admiral

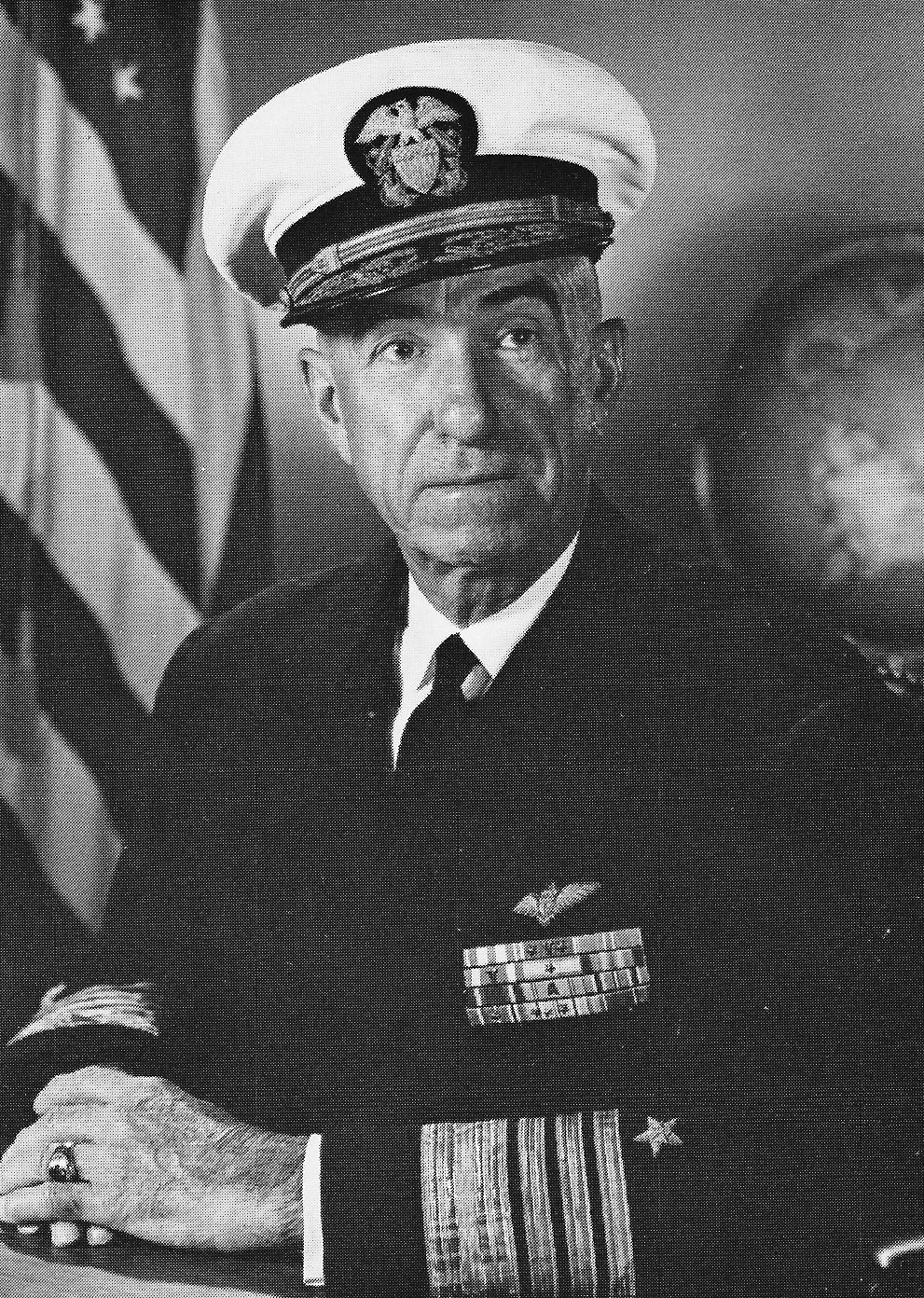
- Born: 4 October 1896; Hillsboro, Ohio, U.S.
- Died: 21 May 1970 (aged 73); Bethesda, Maryland, U.S.
- Military career
- Allegiance: United States
- Branch: United States Navy
- Service years: 1917–1954
- Rank: Admiral
- Commands: Naval Air Force Atlantic; Sixth Fleet; Carrier Division ONE; Carrier Division SEVEN; USS Bunker Hill; USS Long Island; VT-2B; VO-11; VT-20
- Conflicts: World War II
- Awards: Silver Star

John Jennings Ballentine (4 October 1896 – 21 May 1970) was an early United States Naval Aviator who commanded the escort carrier USS Long Island and the fleet carrier USS Bunker Hill during World War II. After the war, he commanded the United States Sixth Fleet and Naval Air Force Atlantic.

== Early life and education ==
John Ballentine was born and raised in Hillsboro, Ohio. He was the son of George McClelland Ballentine and Ora (Eakins) Ballentine. After attending Hillsboro High School, he was appointed to the United States Naval Academy in Annapolis, Maryland, graduating with the Class of 1918 in 1917.

== Career ==
Ballentine was assigned to the battleship USS Nebraska after being commissioned. From February 1919 to May 1920, he served on the battleship USS Arizona.

Ballentine was designated a Naval Aviator on 22 November 1920 after receiving flight training at Naval Air Station Pensacola. In 1923, he helped perform the first tests of Carl Norden's prototype bombsight at the Naval Proving Ground in Dahlgren, Virginia.

In April 1926, Ballentine assumed command of Torpedo Squadron TWENTY (VT-20) whose six seaplane torpedo bombers operated near the Philippines serviced by the fuel ship USS Jason. From May to August 1927, he served as the commanding officer of Observation Squadron ELEVEN (VO-11) whose six seaplanes were assigned to Light Cruiser Division THREE consisting of USS Cincinnati, Richmond and Marblehead operating near China under the command of Rear Admiral John Russell Young Blakely.

Promoted to lieutenant commander on 5 June 1930, Ballentine commanded Torpedo and Bombing Squadron TWO B (VT-2B) from July 1931 to December 1932. His squadron was based on USS Saratoga.

After the United States entered World War II, Ballentine served as the second commanding officer of the escort carrier USS Long Island from 26 December 1941 to 18 April 1942. He was promoted to captain on 30 June 1942. Ballentine served as chief of staff to Task Group 34.2 commander Rear Admiral Ernest D. McWhorter aboard USS Ranger during the Allied invasion of French North Africa in November 1942.

Ballentine served as the first commanding officer of the fleet carrier USS Bunker Hill from 25 May 1943 to 5 February 1944. He was awarded the Silver Star for his actions in November 1943 during the Gilbert Islands campaign. Promoted to rear admiral, Ballentine next served as chief of staff for Naval Air Force Pacific. He later assumed command of Carrier Division SEVEN on 27 June 1945. Based aboard USS Bon Homme Richard operating near Japan as part of Task Force 38, Ballentine continued in this role until 19 August 1945.

After the war, Ballentine commanded Carrier Division ONE in the Mediterranean from 1947 to 1949. His flagship was USS Midway from 1947 to 1948 and USS Franklin D. Roosevelt from 1948 to 1949. He was promoted to vice admiral on 1 November 1949. Ballentine then commanded the U.S. Sixth Fleet from 1949 to 1951 and Naval Air Force Atlantic from 1951 to 1954.

Ballentine was promoted to admiral at the time of his retirement from active duty in May 1954.

== Personal ==
In 1922, Ballentine married Catherine Howard Shield. Ballentine and his wife lived in Dogue, Virginia, after his retirement. He died at Bethesda Naval Hospital in 1970.
