= Ninde =

Ninde may be,

- Ninde language
- Ninde, Virginia
- William Xavier Ninde
- Barbara Ninde Byfield
- Ninde (TV series)
