= King George High School =

Location
- 10100 Foxes Way; King George, Virginia 22485; 38°16′29.3″N 77°11′48″W

Information
- School type: Public high school
- Founded: 1968
- School district: King George County Schools
- Superintendent: Dr. Jesse Boyd
- Principal: Dr. Travis Burns
- Teaching staff: 94.32 (FTE)
- Grades: 9–12
- Enrollment: 1,493 (2023-24)
- Student to teacher ratio: 15.83
- Language: English
- Campus: Rural
- Colors: Royal Blue and gold
- Athletics conference: Battlefield District
- Mascot: Fox
- Rivals: James Monroe High School, Chancellor High School, Courtland High School, Eastern View High School, Caroline High School
- Feeder schools: King George Elementary School, Potomac Elementary School, Sealston Elementary School, and King George Middle School
- Website: Official Site

King George High School is a high school in King George County, Virginia, United States. It has been the only high school in the county since 1968, when the county's schools were integrated and Ralph Bunche High School was closed. In 2006 ground was broken on a new 215,000-square-foot (20,000 m^{2}) high school building that opened in February 2009.

It is the school district for areas adjacent to Naval Surface Warfare Center Dahlgren Division.

== Athletics ==
The Men's Basketball team won the 1969-1970 state championship, the only team state championship for the school.

From the late 1990s until the early 2000s King George won 7 consecutive championships under the leadership of the legendary coach Jim Moyer.

King George High School has won six consecutive Men's district championships and 4 consecutive Women's district titles with the Men's team placing 3rd in the state of Virginia A/AA swimming and diving championships in 2005. The Women's swim team won the district title in 1997, 1998, 2005 and 2008-2011 while the Men's team has won in 2005 and 2008-2011.

King George High School won five consecutive district championships in football between 2020 and 2024.

== Notable alumni ==
- Krystal Ball, Democratic Party Congressional candidate for Virginia.
- Jermon Bushrod, left tackle for the Miami Dolphins
- Collette Wolfe, actress

== See also ==
- Ralph Bunche High School
