= 7-inch/44-caliber gun =

7"/44 caliber Mark 1 and 7"/45 caliber Mark 2 Naval Gun
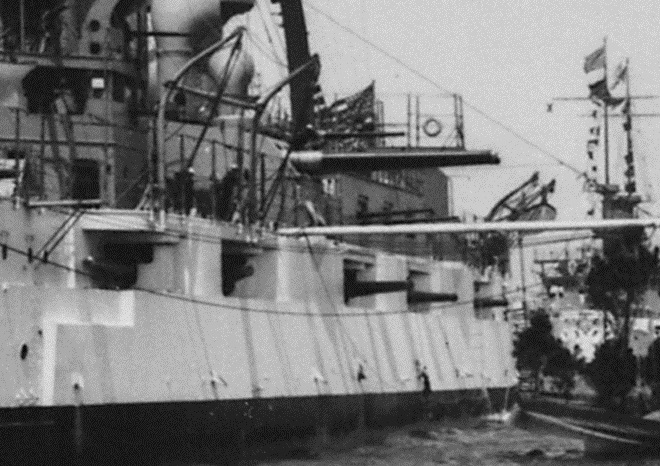
- USS Minnesota (BB-22), cropped photo showing close up of port side 7"/45 caliber guns.
- Type: Naval gun; Coastal artillery; Railway gun
- Place of origin: United States

Service history
- In service: 1906
- Used by: United States Navy; Hellenic Navy
- Wars: World War I; World War II

Production history
- Designer: Bureau of Ordnance
- Designed: 1900
- Manufacturer: Naval Gun Factory
- No. built: Mark 1: 1; Mark 2: 111
- Variants: Mark 1 and Mark 2

Specifications
- Mass: Mark 1: 29,621 lb (13,436 kg) (with breech); Mark 2: 28,700 lb (13,000 kg)
- Length: Mark 1: 316 in (8,000 mm); Mark 2: 323 in (8,200 mm)
- Barrel length: Mark 1: 308 in (7,800 mm) bore (44 calibers); Mark 2: 315 in (8,000 mm) bore (45 calibers)
- Shell: 165 lb (75 kg) armor-piercing (Naval shell); 152 lb (69 kg) armor-piercing (Army/Marine shell)
- Caliber: 7 in (178 mm)
- Breech: Mark 1: Welin breech block
- Recoil: 19 in (480 mm) (nominal); 21 in (530 mm) (maximum)
- Elevation: −7° to +15° (shipboard mount) +40° (tracked mount)
- Traverse: −150° to +150° (shipboard mount)
- Rate of fire: 4 rounds per minute
- Muzzle velocity: 2,700 ft/s (820 m/s)
- Effective firing range: 16,500 yd (15,100 m) at 15° elevation (shipboard mount); 24,000 yards (22,000 m) at 40° elevation (Army/Marine tracked mount)

The 7"/44 caliber gun Mark 1 (spoken "seven-inch-forty-four--caliber") and 7"/45 caliber gun Mark 2 (spoken "seven-inch-forty-five--caliber") were used for the secondary batteries of the United States Navy's last generation of pre-dreadnought battleships, the Connecticut-class and Mississippi-class. The 7-inch (178 mm) caliber was considered, at the time, to be the largest caliber weapon suitable as a rapid-fire secondary gun because its shells were the heaviest that one man could handle alone.

== Design ==
The 7-inch Mark 1 was built in a length of 44 calibers, had a nickel-steel liner, with a tube, jacket and three hoops with a locking ring, all made of gun steel, a screw box liner, and Welin breech block. The Mark 1 was hooped from the breech to 47.5 in (1,210 mm) from the muzzle. Only one Mark 1 was built, the prototype. The Mark 2 was the production version, it was of the same construction as the Mark 1 except that it was hooped all the way to the muzzle and had one caliber, or seven inches, added to its length. The Mark 2 Mod 1 was constructed with a conical nickel-steel liner. Two experimental Mark 2 guns, given serial numbers 2 and 3, were built with wider diameter breech ends, with gun No. 2 modified with a conical nickel-steel liner and modified breech, becoming Mark 2 Mod 2.

The two Mississippi-class battleships were transferred to Greece in 1914 with their 7-inch guns. They were sunk in 1941 during World War II.

Most of the 7-inch guns were removed from warships before World War I and some of the Mark II guns were mounted on Mark V tractor mounts that had been designed by the Navy's Bureau of Ordnance (BuOrd) and built in Philadelphia, by the Baldwin Locomotive Works. The mounts were not self-propelled; the tracked mounting was for cross-country mobility, and they would be towed by a Holt tractor or other vehicle. The Marines ordered 20 of these guns, with the Army later ordering 36; before the Armistice was signed all 20 were delivered to the Marines, while 18 were completed postwar for the Army. The tracked mounting allowed 40° of elevation, for a maximum range of 24,000 yards (22,000 m).

The Army had requested these guns because of their lack of heavy artillery in France. The 20 guns for the Marines were to go to the new 10th Marine Artillery Regiment that was training at Quantico, Virginia, in the fall of 1918. The Marines fired the first shot at Lower Station (Naval Support Facility Dahlgren today) 24,000 yd (22,000 m) down the Potomac River, on 16 October 1918. In common with most US-produced heavy artillery in that war, none of the 7-inch guns were shipped to France, or saw action. In 1920, the Army's Ordnance Department described the weapon as:

"the heaviest and hardest hitting gun for which a mobile field mount has been requested by our Army".

The gun and towed tractor mount are an ancestor of the self-propelled artillery that has played a major role in most wars since.

Also in World War I, twelve 7-inch guns were mounted as railway artillery for the Army. None were shipped overseas in that war. These appear to have been dismounted and used as coast artillery after the war. However, at least one was transferred to Brazil, as a railway gun in 1941.

Due to the emergency situation at the beginning of World War II, several of these guns were pressed into service as coastal defense batteries.

== Naval service ==
Ship	Gun Installed	Gun Mount
USS Connecticut (BB-18)	Mark 2: 7"/45 caliber	Mark 1 and Mark 2: 12 × single pedestal for casemates
USS Louisiana (BB-19)	Mark 2: 7"/45 caliber	Mark 1 and Mark 2: 12 × single pedestal for casemates
USS Vermont (BB-20)	Mark 2: 7"/45 caliber	Mark 1 and Mark 2: 12 × single pedestal for casemates
USS Kansas (BB-21)	Mark 2: 7"/45 caliber	Mark 1 and Mark 2: 12 × single pedestal for casemates
USS Minnesota (BB-22)	Mark 2: 7"/45 caliber	Mark 1 and Mark 2: 12 × single pedestal for casemates
USS New Hampshire (BB-25)	Mark 2: 7"/45 caliber	Mark 1 and Mark 2: 12 × single pedestal for casemates
USS Mississippi (BB-23)	Mark 2: 7"/45 caliber	Mark 1 and Mark 2: 8 × single pedestal for casemates
USS Idaho (BB-24)	Mark 2: 7"/45 caliber	Mark 1 and Mark 2: 8 × single pedestal for casemates

== Coast defense locations ==
7-inch guns were emplaced during World War II at numerous locations, operated by the United States Army Coast Artillery Corps. This list is not exhaustive. They were grouped into two-gun batteries unless otherwise noted.

- Two guns at Battery Zeilin, Fort Rosecrans, San Diego, CA
- Four guns in the Harbor Battery, Sand Island in Honolulu harbor, HI
- Two guns in the casemated "Hulu" battery, Pu'u O Hulu Military Reservation, Oahu, HI
- Three guns in the "Homestead" battery, Keaau Homesteads, Oahu, HI
- Four guns in two unnamed casemated batteries on Kauai at Ahukini and Monument.
- At least eight guns in Batteries North, East, West, and South at Bora Bora, French Polynesia
- An unknown number of railway guns were transferred to Brazil in 1941; one is preserved there
- Four guns were shipped to the Marine Defense Battalion at Midway Island in 1942, and were available for the Battle of Midway

== Survivors ==
At least thirteen guns are preserved, ten of them Mark 2 guns used for coast defense in World War II.

- Fort DeRussy, Honolulu, Hawaii
  - Two guns, Midvale Nos. 90 and 92, formerly on Sand Island in Honolulu harbor, also formerly on USS New Hampshire.
- Bora Bora, French Polynesia
  - Seven guns, Naval Gun Factory Nos. 81, 82, 96, 97, Watervliet Nos. 57 and 60, Midvale No. 89. The two Watervliet guns were formerly on USS Louisiana, the Midvale gun was on USS New Hampshire.
- Papeete, Tahiti, French Polynesia
  - One gun, Bethlehem No. 100, formerly at Bora Bora.
- Naval Surface Warfare Center Dahlgren, Dahlgren, Virginia – only surviving tractor-mounted gun, on loan from the National Museum of the Marine Corps.
- One gun, National Museum of the United States Navy, Washington Navy Yard, DC
- Museu Militar Conde de Linhares, Rio de Janeiro, Brazil – Only surviving 7-inch railway gun
7"/45-Caliber Guns
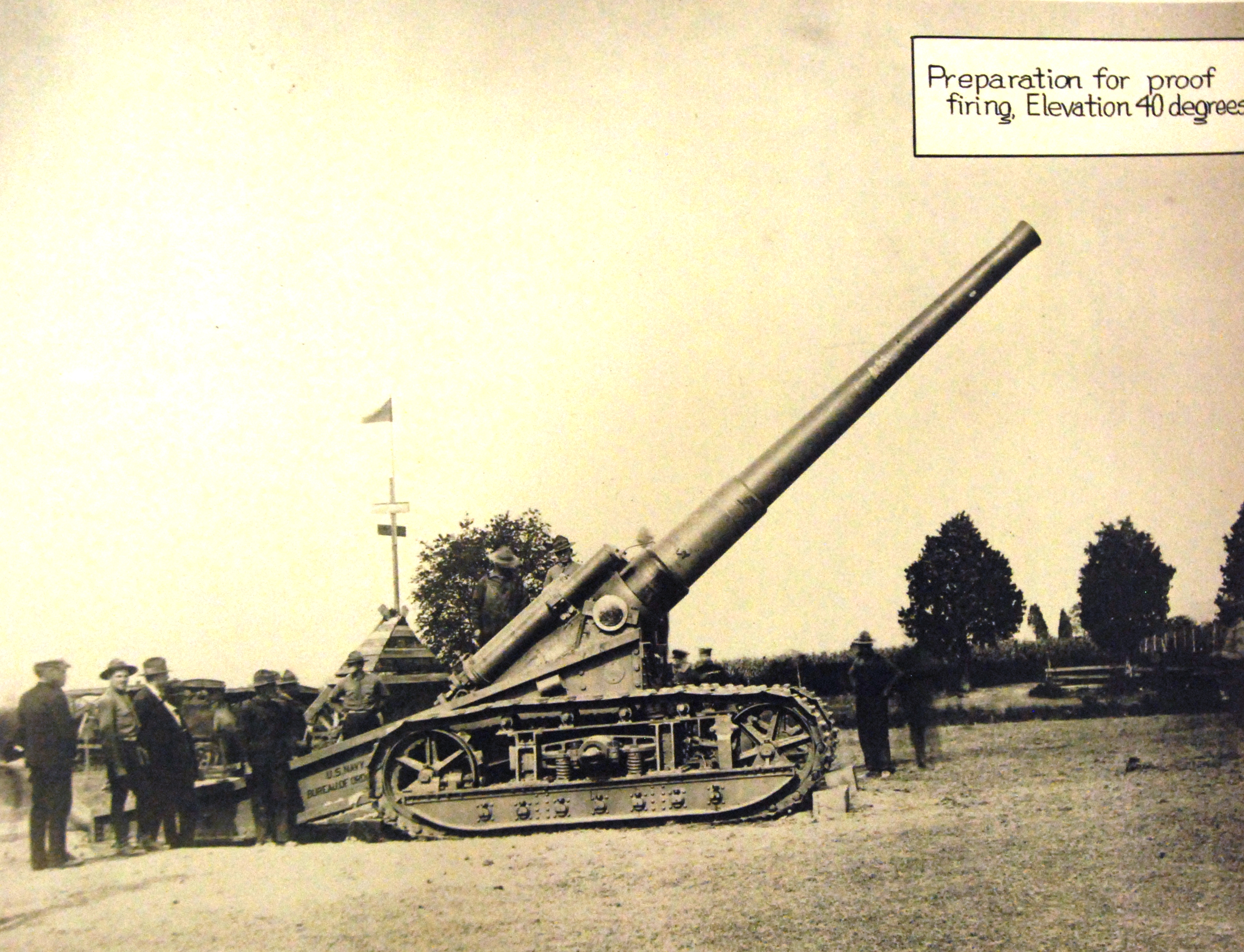
World War I-era 7" tractor mount gun used at Dahlgren Naval Proving Ground

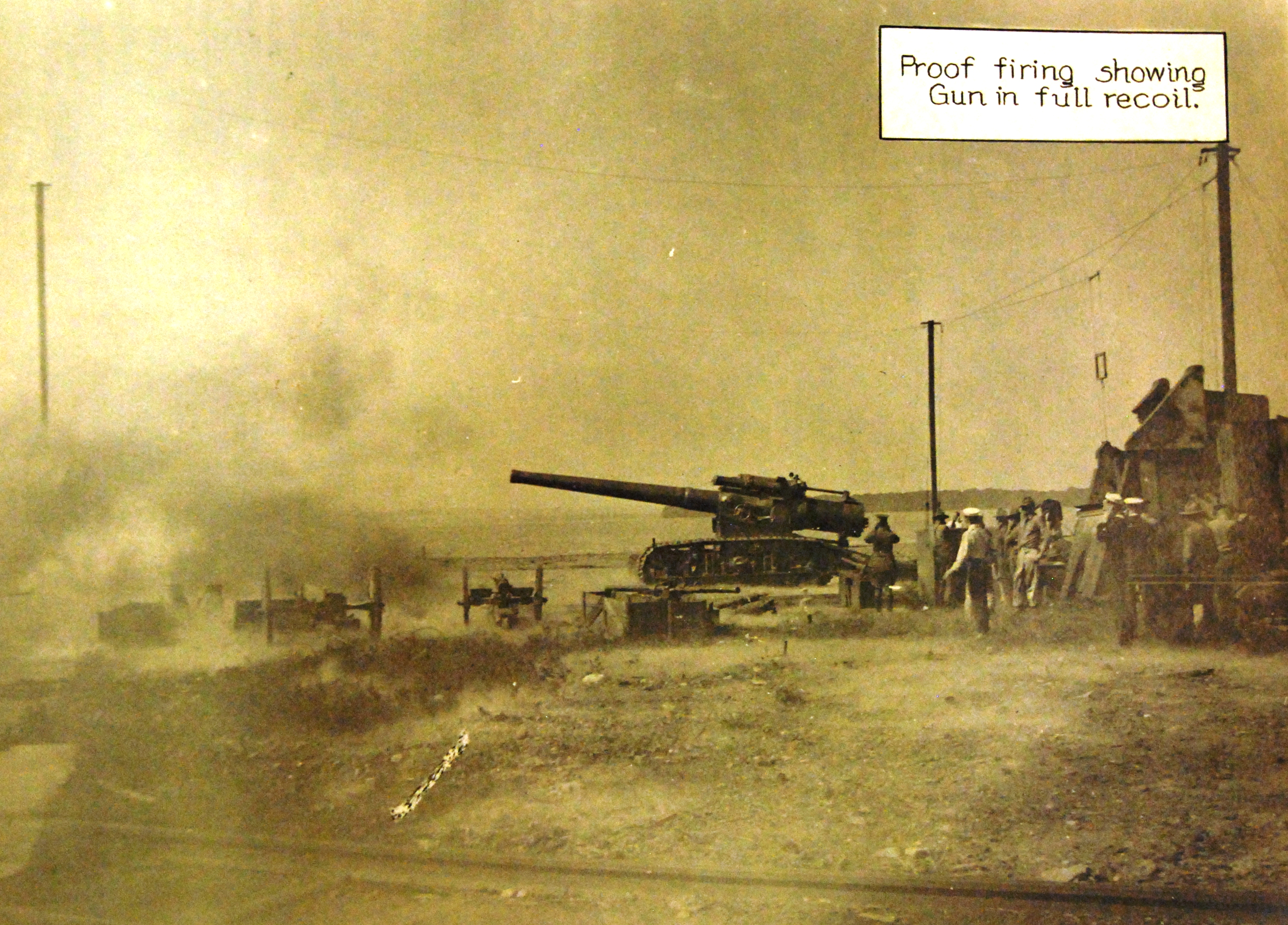
World War I-era 7" Mark V tractor mount gun at full recoil

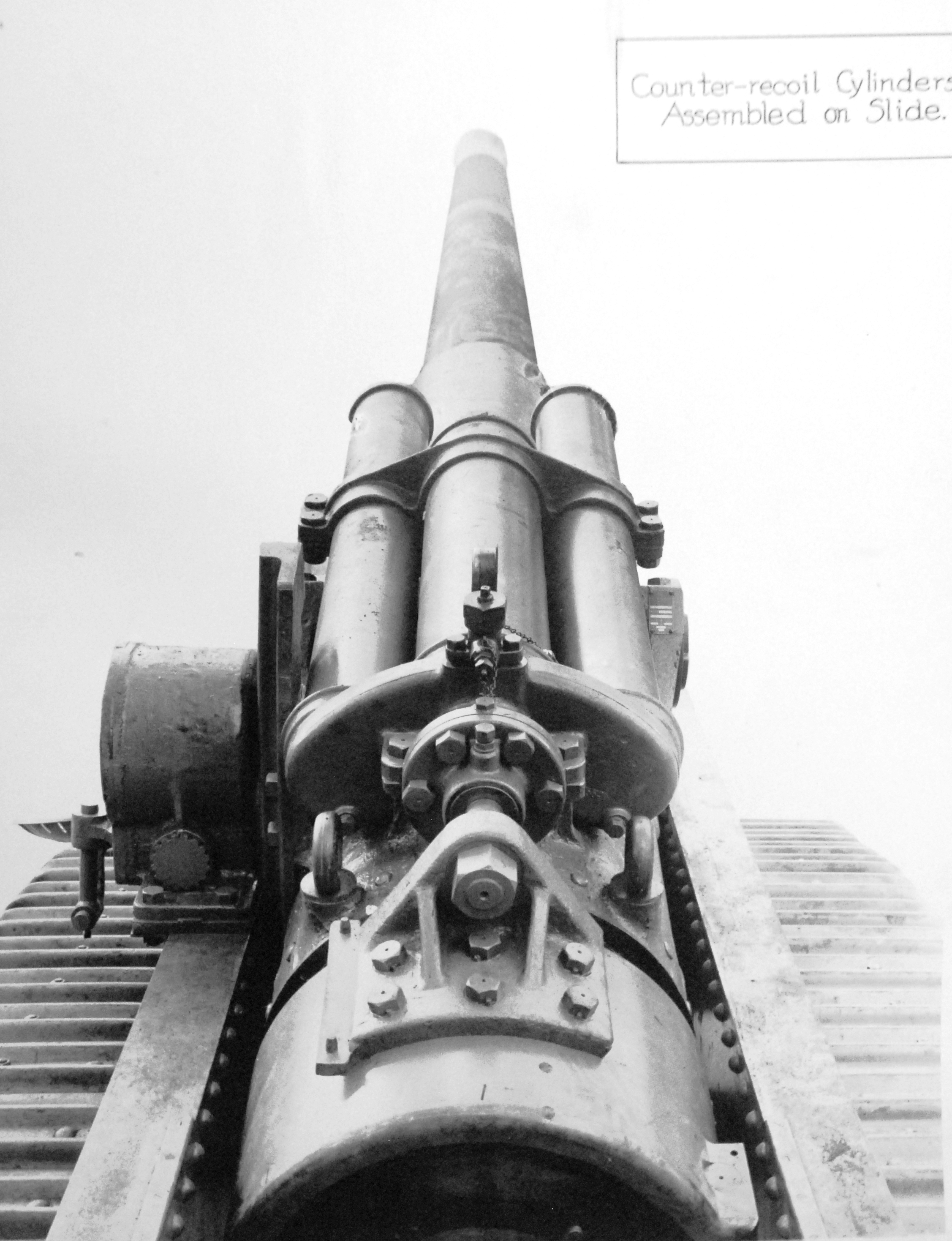
7" Tractor Mount Mark V, counter-recoil cylinders assembled on slide

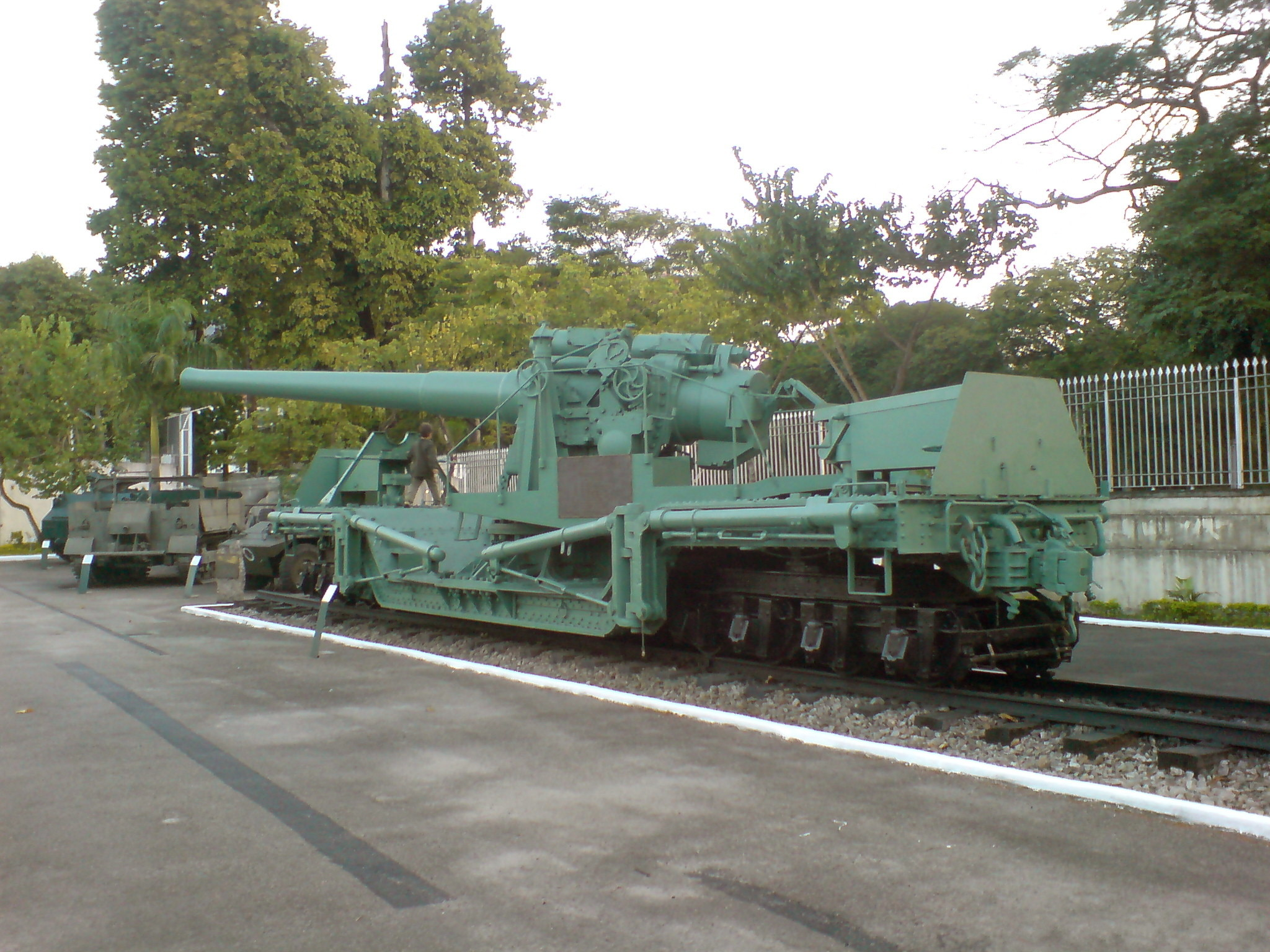
A 7-inch railway gun preserved at the Museu Militar Conde de Linhares in Rio de Janeiro, Brazil. Transferred to Brazil in 1941.

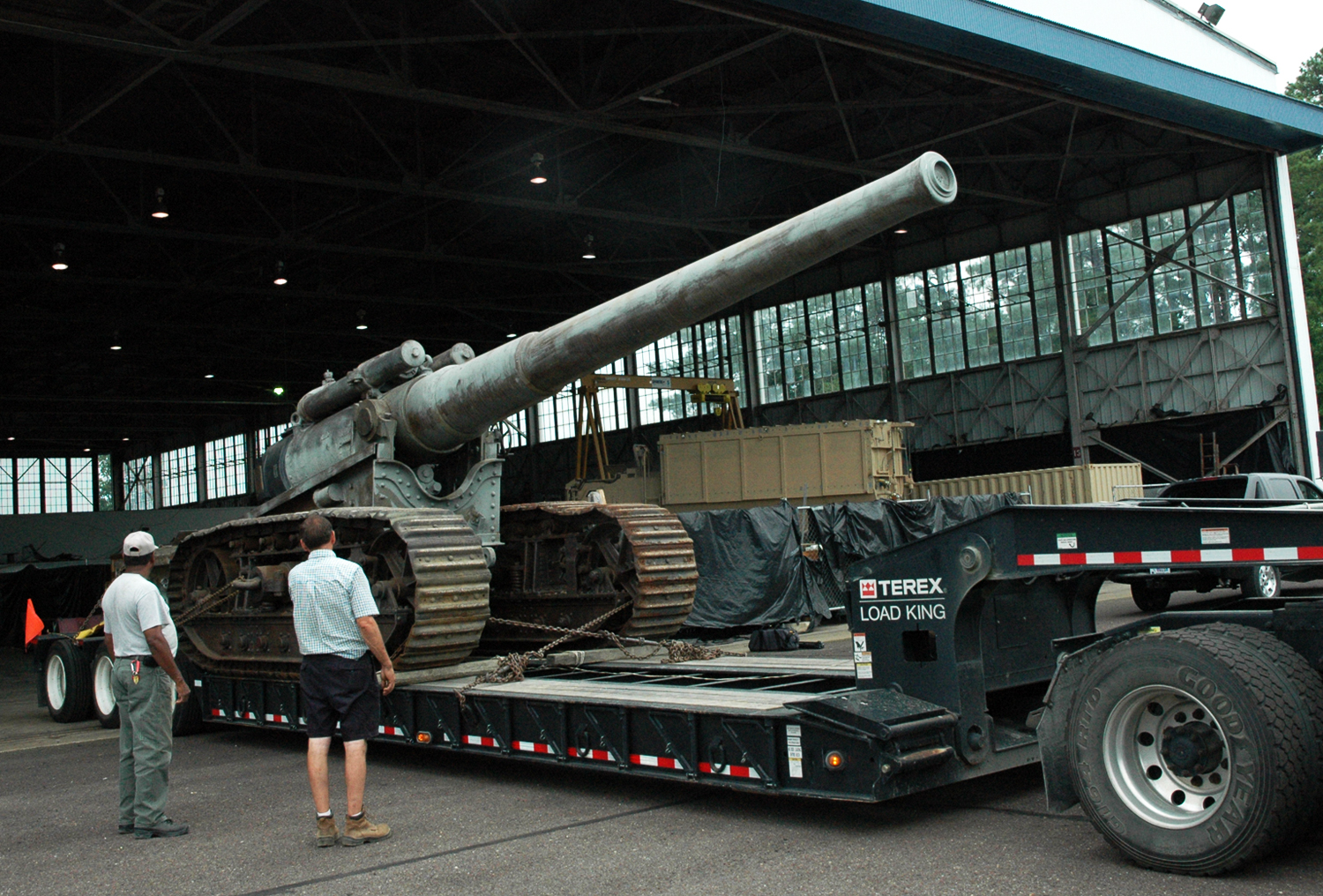
Transportation personnel at Naval Support Facility Dahlgren prepare to off-load a World War I-era 7-inch gun on a tracked mount, the first gun originally test-fired to mark the establishment of Dahlgren as a naval proving ground on Oct. 16, 1918. The 7-inch, 45 caliber gun will be restored by the Naval Surface Warfare Center Dahlgren Division.

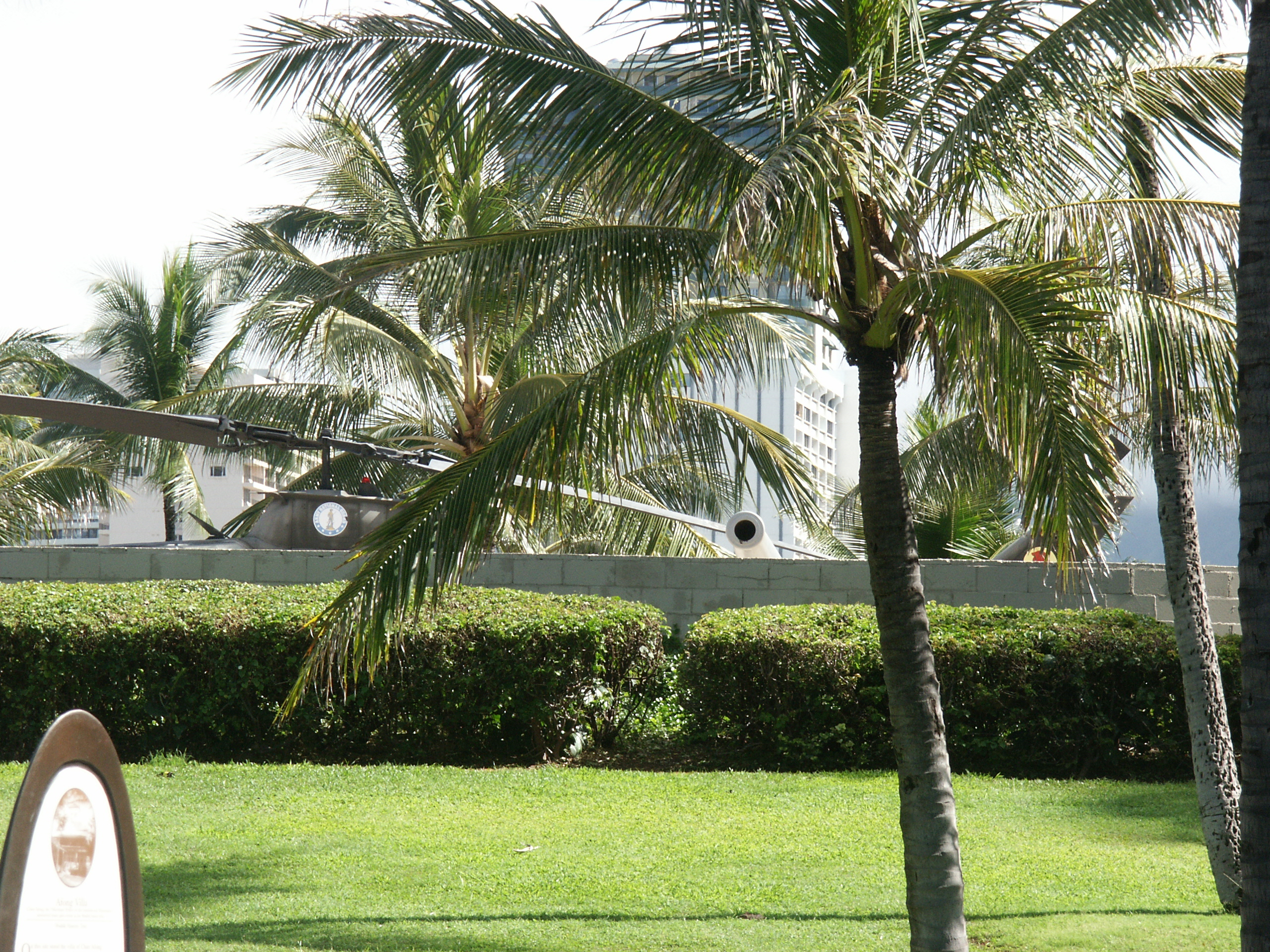
Front close up of Battery Randolph in Fort DeRussy in Honolulu, Hawaiʻi.

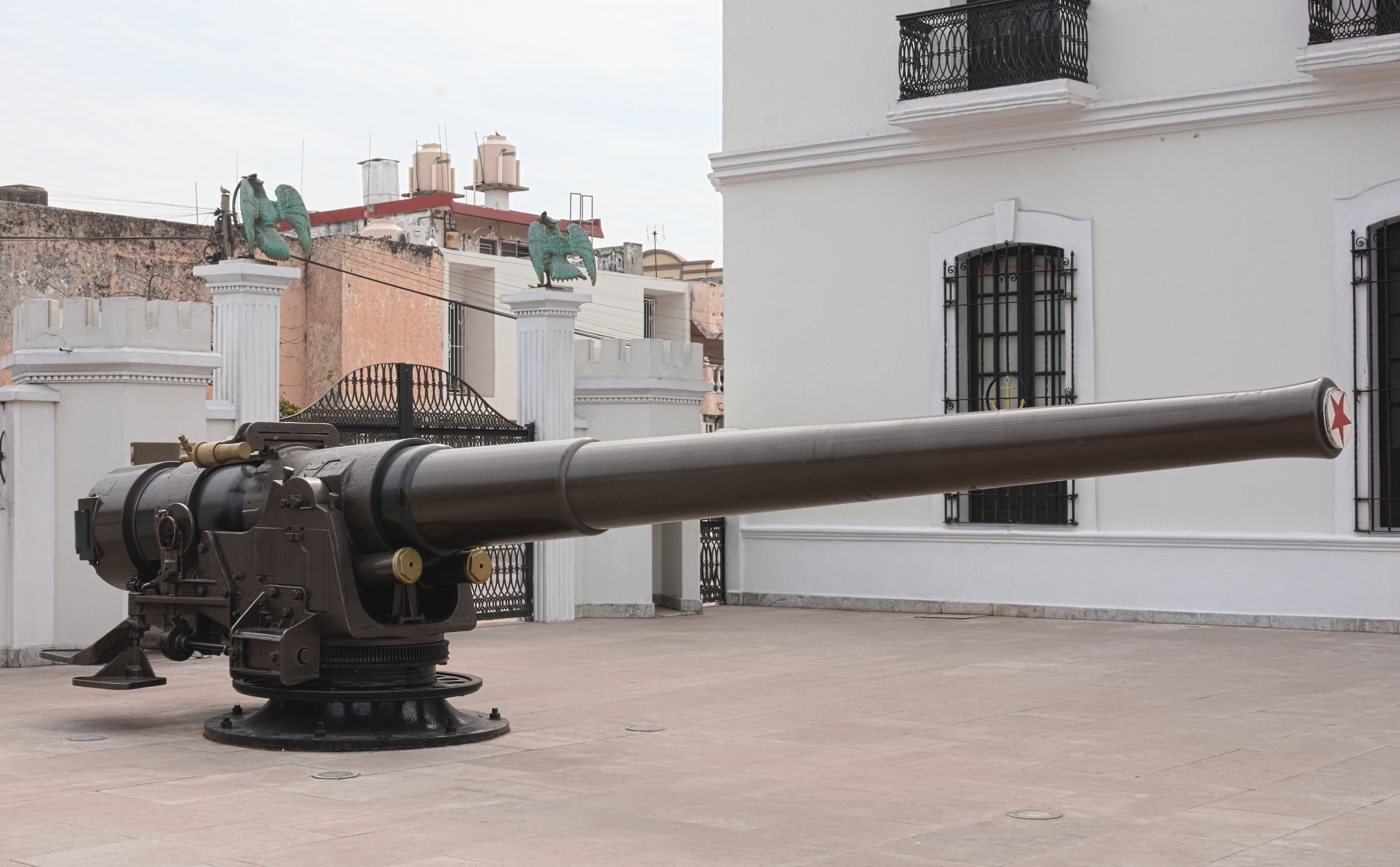
A 7 inch cannon at the Mexican Naval Museum.

== Bibliography ==
=== Printed sources ===
- Berhow, Mark A., ed. (2015). American Seacoast Defenses, A Reference Guide (Third ed.). McLean, Virginia: CDSG Press. ISBN 978-0-9748167-3-9.
- Friedman, Norman (2011). Naval Weapons of World War One. Seaforth Publishing. ISBN 978-1-84832-100-7.
- Lewis, E. R. & Robbins, C. B. (2004). "Brazi's Coast Defense Rearmament, 1939–1945". Warship International. XLI (1): 52–53. ISSN 0043-0374.
- Miller, H. W. (1921). A Report on the Characteristics, Scope of Utility, Etc. of Railway Artillery. Vol. I.
- Williford, Glen (2016). American Breechloading Mobile Artillery, 1875–1953. Atglen, Pennsylvania: Schiffer Publishing. ISBN 978-0-7643-5049-8.
- Marshall, Peter A. (2010). "History of the U.S. Navy 7-in/45 Gun". Warship International. XLVII (2): 153–179. ISSN 0043-0374.

=== Online Sources ===
- "United States of America 7"/44 (17.8 cm) Mark 1 7"/45 (17.8 cm) Mark 2". Navweaps. 30 July 2016.
- Hartwell, Joe (21 September 2002). "US Army Railway Artillery Projects".
- Joyce, John J. (23 July 2009). "First Gun Fired at Dahlgren in 1918 Returns Home". Dahlgren, Virginia. Archived from the original on 13 October 2012.
