= King George County Schools =

School district in Virginia, United States

Coordinates: 38°16′9″N 77°11′29″W

Address
- PO Box 1239 King George, Virginia, 22485; United States

District information
- Type: Public
- Grades: Pre-K through 12
- Superintendent: Dr. Jesse Boyd
- School board: 5 members
- Chair of the board: David Bush
- Governing agency: Virginia Department of Education
- Schools: 5

Other information
- Website: www.kgcs.k12.va.us

King George County Schools is a school division that serves students in King George County, Virginia. The district administers 3 elementary schools, 1 middle school, and 1 high school.

It serves all parts of the county for grades Pre-K through 12, except for those within Naval Surface Warfare Center Dahlgren Division, which are served by the Department of Defense Education Activity (DoDEA), for grades K-8.

== Administration ==
=== Superintendent ===
The superintendent of King George County Schools is Dr. Jesse Boyd.

=== School Board ===
There are five members of the King George County School Board:

- David Bush, Chair
- Cathy Hoover, Vice Chair
- Colleen Davis
- Carrie Cleveland
- Ed Frank

== Schools ==
There are 5 schools in King George County.

=== Elementary schools ===
King George Elementary School

- King George, Virginia
- Principal: Ronald Monroe
- Mascot: Eagles

Potomac Elementary School

- King George, Virginia
- Principal: Dr. Melinda Brown
- Mascot: Hawks

Sealston Elementary School

- King George, Virginia
- Principal: Sandra Elia
- Mascot: Tigers

=== Middle school ===
King George Middle School

- King George, Virginia
- Principal: Dr. Casey Nice
- Mascot: Foxes

=== High school ===
King George High School

- King George, Virginia
- Principal: Dr. Travis Burns
- Mascot: Foxes
