= Index, Virginia =

Unincorporated community in Virginia, United States

- Unincorporated community
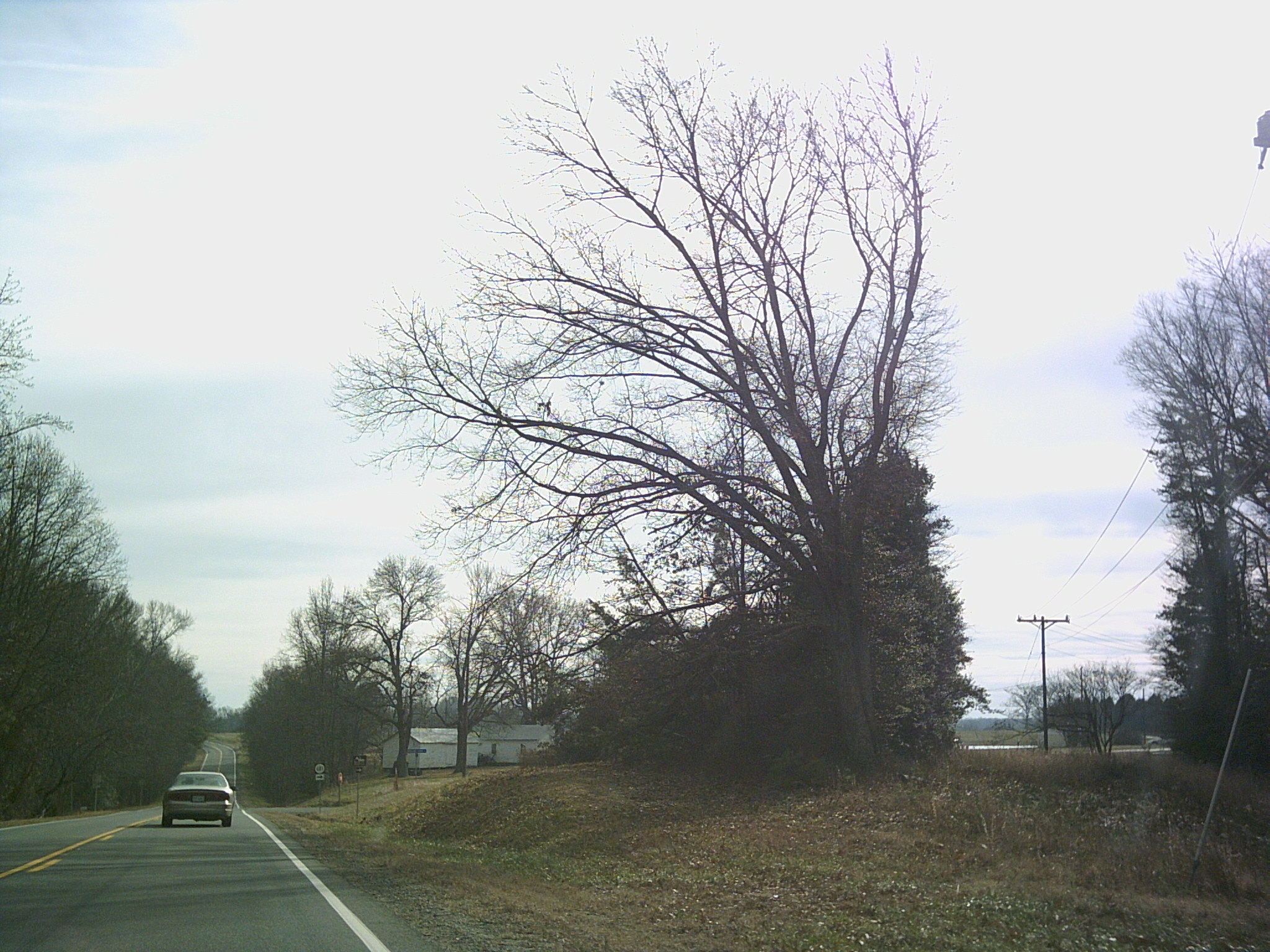
- Scrubland in Index

- Location within Virginia and the United States Index (the United States)
- Coordinates: 38°11′37″N 77°4′48″W
- Country: United States
- State: Virginia
- County: King George
- Time zone: UTC−5 (Eastern (EST))
  - Summer (DST): UTC−4 (EDT)

Index is an unincorporated community located in King George County, in the U. S. state of Virginia. The area became known as Index after the establishment of a Post Office in 1898 by local merchant Peyton Parker, who built a General Store a few years prior. The store was at the intersection of Kings Highway and Salem Church Road and the building is still there today. The store sold everything including cloths, furniture, and seed to local farmers. The Index Post Office closed in 1965 and the store a few years later. Prior to the naming of the Index Post Office, the area was known as Johnsville.

According to The Free Lance-Star, Index got its name from its first postmaster, who took the word from a book's index while reading the book for name ideas.
