= Dogue, Virginia =

Unincorporated community in Virginia, United States

- Unincorporated community
- Location within Virginia and the United States Dogue (the United States)
- Coordinates: 38°13′55″N 77°12′57″W
- Country: United States
- State: Virginia
- County: King George
- Time zone: UTC−5 (Eastern (EST))
  - Summer (DST): UTC−4 (EDT)
- ZIP code: 22451

Dogue is an unincorporated community in King George County, Virginia, United States. Its name comes from the Doeg tribe that once inhabited the region.

== Notable people ==
- John J. Ballentine, US Navy Admiral
