= Jersey, Virginia =

Unincorporated community in Virginia, United States

- Unincorporated community
- Location within Virginia and the United States Jersey (the United States)
- Coordinates: 38°12′41″N 77°08′22″W
- Country: United States
- State: Virginia
- County: King George
- Time zone: UTC−5 (Eastern (EST))
  - Summer (DST): UTC−4 (EDT)
- ZIP code: 22481

Jersey is an unincorporated community in King George County, Virginia, United States.
