= Hampstead, New Kent County, Virginia =

Unincorporated community in Virginia, US

Coordinates: 37°36′22″N 77°07′47″W

Hampstead is an unincorporated community in New Kent County, Virginia, United States.
