= Naval Surface Warfare Center Dahlgren Division =

Division of the U.S. Naval Surface Warfare Center

Naval Support Facility Dahlgren
- Part of Naval Support Activity South Potomac
- Dahlgren, Virginia in the United States
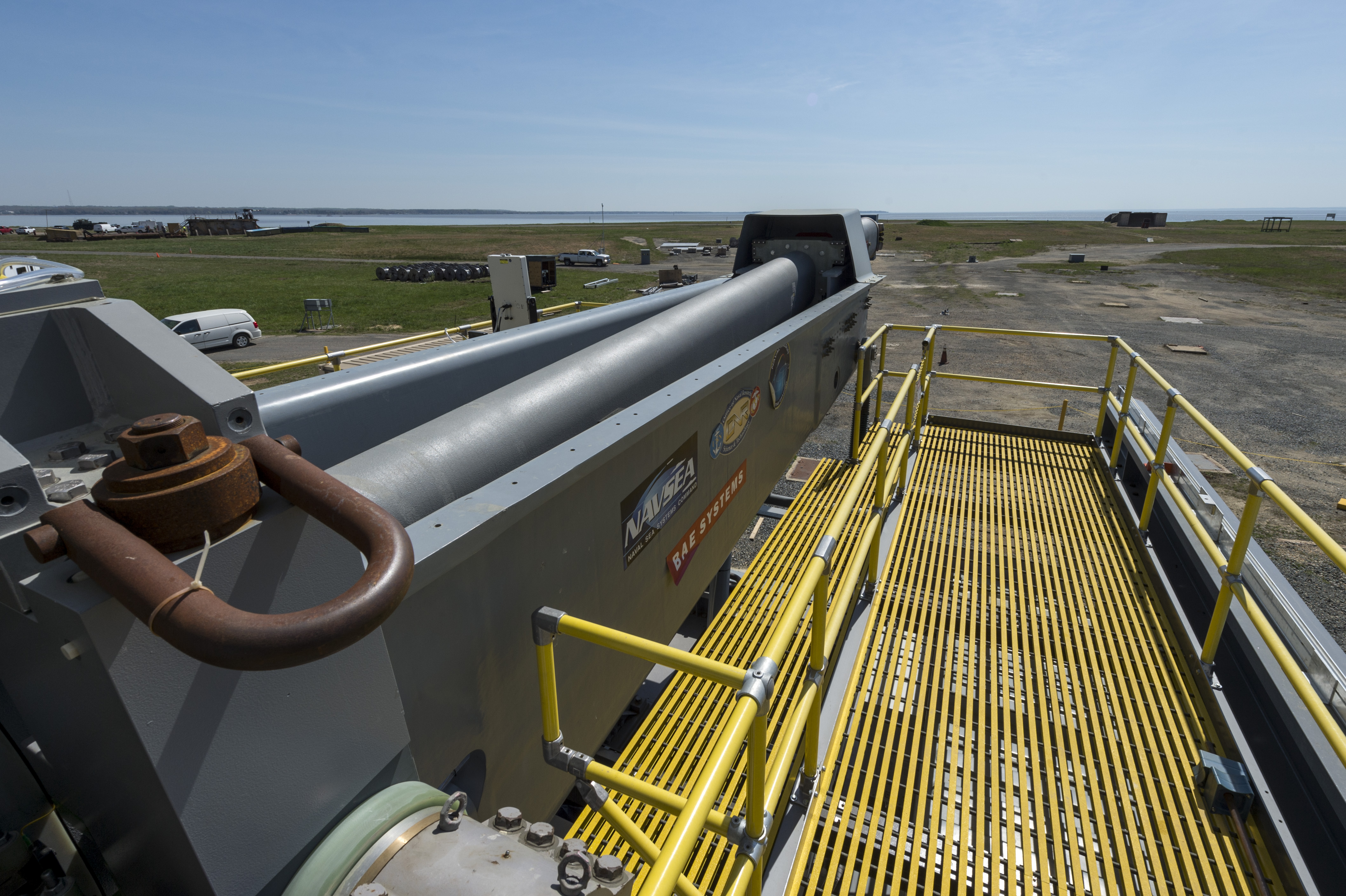
- An electromagnetic railgun at terminal range located at the Naval Surface Warfare Center Dahlgren

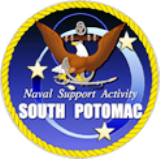

Site information
- Type: Naval Support Facility
- Owner: Department of Defense
- Operator: US Navy
- Controlled by: Naval District Washington
- Condition: Operational
- Website: https://www.navsea.navy.mil/Home/Warfare-Centers/NSWC-Dahlgren/ navy.mil

Location
- Location in Virginia Location in the United States
- Coordinates: 38°19′30″N 77°02′00″W

Site history
- Built: 1918 (as Lower Station of the Naval Powder Factory at Indian Head)
- In use: 1918 – present

Garrison information
- Current commander: Captain Todd Copeland
- Garrison: Naval Surface Warfare Center Dahlgren Division

Airfield information
- Identifiers: IATA: NPY, ICAO: KNDY, FAA LID: NPY
- Elevation: 18 metres (59 ft) AMSL
Runways
Direction	Length and surface
16/34	1,277 metres (4,190 ft) Asphalt

The United States Naval Surface Warfare Center Dahlgren Division (NSWCDD), named for Rear Admiral John A. Dahlgren, is located in King George County, Virginia, near the largest fleet concentration area in the Navy. NSWCDD is part of the Naval Surface Warfare Centers under the Naval Sea Systems Command (NAVSEA). NSWCDD was established on 16 October 1918 as Lower Station, Dahlgren Naval Proving Ground, a remote extension of Maryland's Indian Head Proving Ground. The site was chosen so that naval guns and other high-powered munitions could be tested by firing shells into the Potomac River.

The NSWCDD employs about 4,700 scientists, engineers and support personnel at the Dahlgren organization and more than 350 at NSWCDD DNA. In 2008, Panama City Coastal Systems Station at the Naval Support Activity Panama City was moved out of Dahlgren Division to become its own NSWC division.

The base where NSWCDD is located was renamed the Naval Support Activity Dahlgren (NSA Dahlgren) in 2003 when Naval Installations Command assumed base operating functions, leaving NSWCDD as an installation tenant; the names NSWCDD or NSWC are still commonly used to refer to the base. There are a few other major tenant commands on the base such as the Joint Warfare Analysis Center and the Aegis Training and Readiness Center (ATRC) involved in the training and development for the Aegis Combat System, and training and development for other future shipboard combat systems. NSF Dahlgren was home to Naval Space Surveillance System Command (NAVSPASUR) until that function was transferred to the Air Force in 2004. In 2006, the installation's name was changed to Naval Support Facility Dahlgren when it was merged by Naval District Washington with Naval Support Activity Indian Head under Naval Support Activity South Potomac.

The base is recognized by the Census Bureau as a census-designated place (CDP), Dahlgren Center. Its population as of the 2010 census was 599. It is distinct from the CDP of Dahlgren, Virginia, to the west.

== History ==
Dahlgren was established in spring 1918 as a Naval Proving Ground. Its recorded first work, the firing of a 7-inch (178-millimetre)/45 caliber tractor-mounted gun, occurred on 16 October 1918, which is recognized as the official founding date. The proving ground was named to honor Rear Admiral John Adolphus Dahlgren, a Civil War Navy commander and the "father of modern naval ordnance."

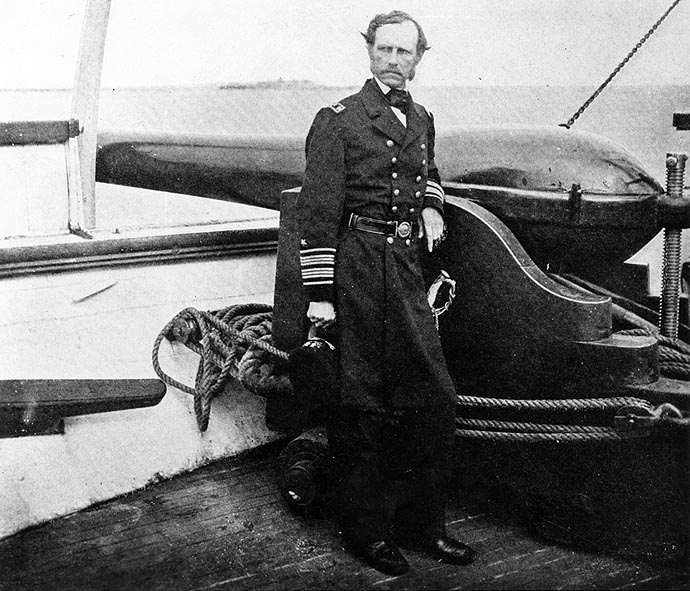
John A. Dahlgren

Before 1918, the Navy operated a proving ground at Indian Head, Maryland, but it became inadequate as advances in gun designs and ordnance made its range obsolete. During World War I, a range of 90,000 yards (82,000 m) was sought by the Navy to prove its new battleship guns. The range was required to be over water but inside the territorial waters of the United States. The area from Machodoc Creek to Point Lookout on the Potomac River was selected because of its straight lines, accessibility, lack of rapids, and generally ice-free climate. At the time of Dahlgren's establishment, the area was extremely remote and relatively unpopulated. Thus, to recruit and retain the highly specialized work force required, the Navy promised to supply housing, food and medical services, schools, recreation, and other socially needed infrastructure.

In the 1920s and 1930s, Dahlgren mainly proofed and tested every major gun in the Navy's arsenal, mostly at the Main Range Gun Line on the Potomac River. Dahlgren also helped test bombsights, including the Norden bombsight, for the Navy's fledgling air forces.

During World War II, Dahlgren became involved with new computational devices (computers) because of its ordnance requirements. Ground-breaking early computers were sent to Dahlgren to help with ballistic work and other directives, including the Aiken Relay Calculator and the Naval Ordnance Research Calculator (NORC). The computer and ordnance work attracted brilliant young scientists and engineers to the area, and some were tapped to help with the Manhattan Project development of the atomic bomb. Two of them were Dr. Norris E. Bradbury, later the director of the Los Alamos National Laboratory, and Deak Parsons, the weaponeer on the Enola Gay, the aircraft that dropped the Little Boy atomic bomb on Hiroshima, Japan, in 1945.

In the years after the war, Dahlgren's work force was cut back. But the laboratory's strong computer and ordnance expertise kept the base open and Navy work flowing. The onset of the Cold War and the Korean War renewed demand for new offensive and defensive ship systems. In 1958, with the Soviet Union's launching of Sputnik I, a space race began. Dahlgren opened its gates that year to its first tenant activity, the Naval Space Surveillance Center, which selected Dahlgren to be at the center of the laboratory's growing computer advances. It was around this time that Dahlgren became heavily involved with the development of Fleet Ballistic Missiles, later called Submarine-Launched Ballistic Missiles.

In the 1970s and 1980s, Dahlgren was on the leading edge of naval surface weapons work with programs such as the Tomahawk missile, which improved the Navy's capacity to perform attacks on land targets from a distance that decreased the risk to ships. Dahlgren also was critical in work to protect Navy ships from enemy missile and air attacks with programs such as the Standard missile and the Aegis Combat System. That work continues as of 2017, along with the electromagnetic railgun, DDG 1000, Littoral Combat Ship (LCS), and Chemical Biological and Radiological Defense.

Because of the laboratory's broad-based growth in research and development and with its new missions, Dahlgren's name officially changed to the Naval Weapons Laboratory in 1959. It was later changed to the Naval Surface Weapons Center in 1974 with the merger of the former Naval Ordnance Laboratory at White Oak, Maryland. In 1987, the name was changed again to the Naval Surface Warfare Center as new and expanded missions were added. And, in 1992, with the consolidations of naval laboratories into one headquarters center, it became the Dahlgren Division of the Naval Surface Warfare Center.

== Research and development ==
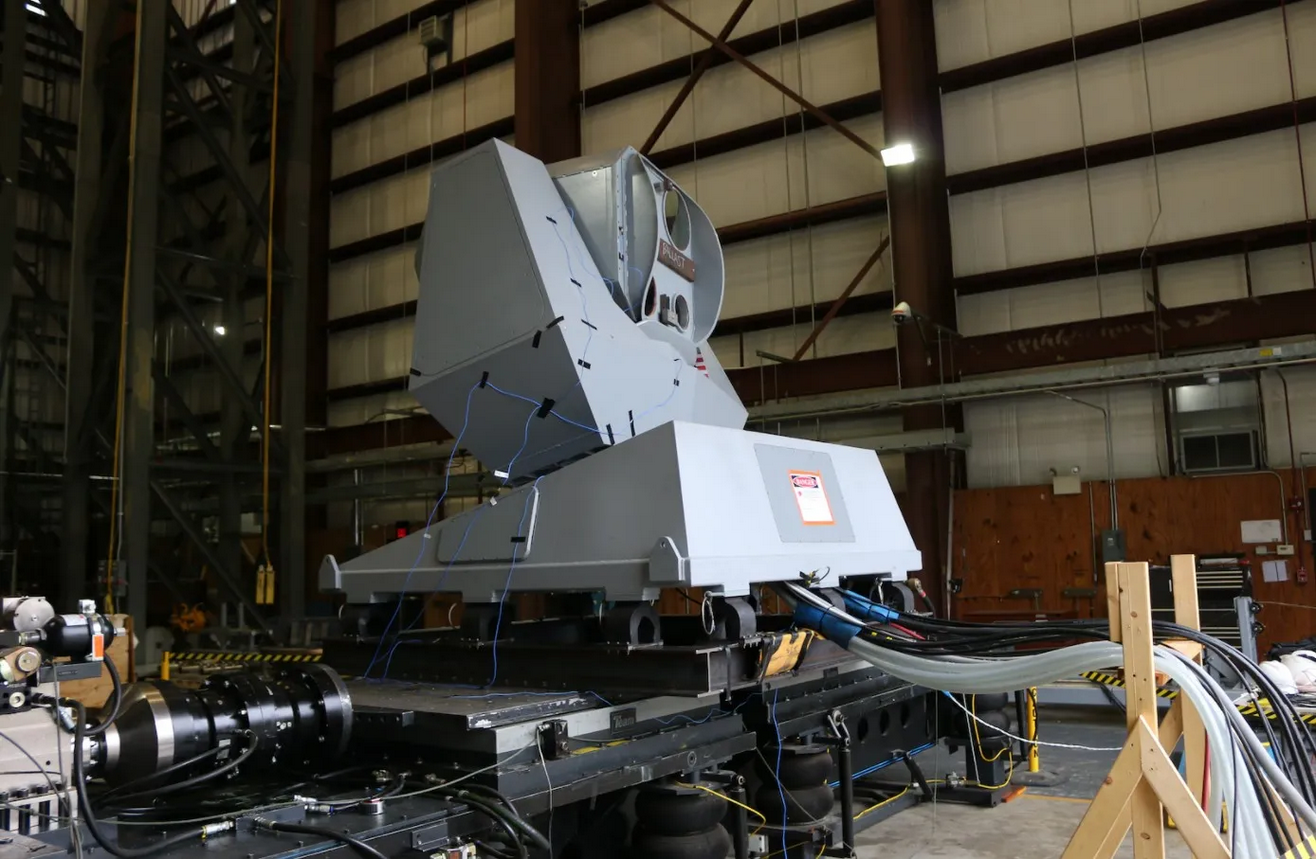
AN/SEQ-4 ODIN being tested at Naval Support Facility Dahlgren in 2020.

NSWCDD conducts basic research in all systems-related areas and pursues scientific disciplines including biotechnology, chemistry, mathematics, laser and computer technology, chemical, mechanical, electrical and systems engineering, physics and computer science. Distinguished figures who have worked for the NSWCDD include physicists Albert Einstein, Edward Teller, Carl Norden, and computer pioneers Howard Aiken and Grace Hopper.

Engineering projects of historical or military significance developed at NSWCDD include the triggering device on the Hiroshima atomic bomb, the Norden Bombsight used on most American bombers such as the B-17 Flying Fortress, B-24 Liberator and B-29 Superfortress during World War II, the Standard missile used on modern United States Navy warships, and the warhead for the AIM-54 Phoenix. Current projects include the majority of US research into directed-energy weapons, railgun technology and weapons integration for the Littoral combat ship.

== STEM outreach ==
NSWCDD scientists and engineers share their technological expertise by participating in science, technology, engineering, and mathematics (STEM) activities to inspire students to pursue technical careers. NSWCDD mentors support summer academies, such as the Virginia Demonstration Project, where they introduce robotics and basic engineering principles to area middle and high school students through hands-on activities. NSWCDD also has educational partnerships with several universities across the U.S.

== Education ==
The Department of Defense Education Activity (DoDEA), which serves as the local school district for the base, has a K-8 school, Dahlgren Elementary Middle School. The school first opened in 1921. The school's principal facility was built during World War II. In 2011 a review of the building found that it was in "poor" shape.

King George County Public Schools operates non-DoDEA public schools in King George County. Most off-post persons associated with NSWCDD send their children to King George County Schools. Potomac Elementary School, operated by King George County Schools, is in proximity to the main entrance to NSWC Dahlgren. King George High School is the local county high school.

== See also ==
- NATACMS
- NSRDC BQM-108
- Dahlgren Railroad Heritage Trail
- List of United States Navy airfields
