= Jermon Bushrod =

American football player (born 1984)

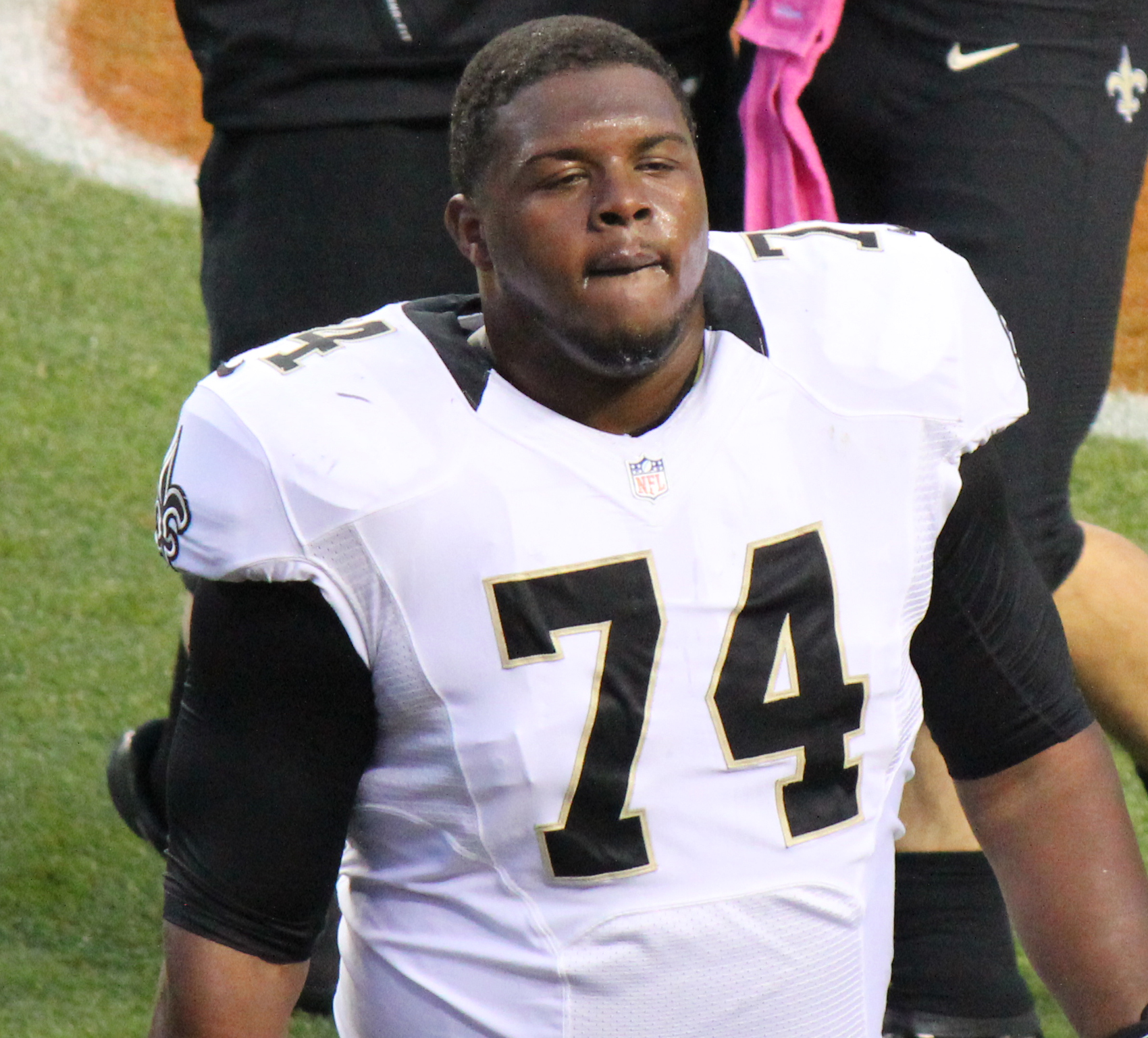
- Bushrod with the New Orleans Saints in 2012

No. 74
- Position: Guard

Personal information
- Born: August 19, 1984 (age 42); King George, Virginia, U.S.
- Listed height: 6 ft 5 in (1.96 m)
- Listed weight: 318 lb (144 kg)

Career information
- High school: King George
- College: Towson (2002–2006)
- NFL draft: 2007: 4th round, 125th overall pick

Career history
- New Orleans Saints (2007–2012); Chicago Bears (2013–2015); Miami Dolphins (2016–2017); New Orleans Saints (2018)

Awards and highlights
- Super Bowl champion (XLIV); 2× Pro Bowl (2011, 2012); Madden Most Valuable Protectors Award (2009)

Career NFL statistics
- Games played: 145
- Games started: 128
- Fumble recoveries: 2
- Stats at Pro Football Reference

Jermon Terrell Bushrod (born August 19, 1984) is an American former professional football player who was a guard in the National Football League (NFL). He played college football for the Towson Tigers and was selected by the New Orleans Saints in the fourth round of the 2007 NFL draft. Bushrod played 12 seasons in the NFL, including seven for the Saints, and was their starting left tackle in their Super Bowl XLIV championship. He also played for the Chicago Bears and Miami Dolphins.

== Early life ==
Bushrod was born in King George, Virginia, and attended King George High School, where he lettered in football, basketball, and baseball. He was an all-state honorable mention at offensive tackle and won a district championship with the Foxes in basketball.

== College career ==
Bushrod played college football for the Towson University Tigers, where he was a four-year starter. After redshirting in 2002, Bushrod was named third-team All-Atlantic 10 in his sophomore and junior years. In 2006, he was an All-Atlantic 10 selection at left tackle, and helped the Tigers to a 7-4 record. He finished his collegiate career with a streak of 38 consecutive starts.

== Professional career ==
Pre-draft measurables
Height	Weight	40-yard dash	10-yard split	20-yard split	20-yard shuttle	Vertical jump	Broad jump	Bench press
6 ft 4 5/8 in (1.95 m)	315 lb (143 kg)	4.92 s	1.61 s	2.82 s	4.72 s	30.5 in (0.77 m)	8 ft 6 in (2.59 m)	22 reps
All values from Pro Day

=== New Orleans Saints (first stint) ===
Bushrod was selected in the fourth round (125th overall) by the New Orleans Saints in the 2007 NFL draft. The Saints acquired the fourth round pick along with Mark Simoneau from the Philadelphia Eagles as part of the deal that sent Donté Stallworth to Philadelphia in 2006. On June 20, 2007, Bushrod signed a three-year contract. Bushrod's NFL debut was on November 11, 2007 against the Houston Texans. Bushrod played in only three games prior to the 2009 season. However, after an injury to Saints' starting left tackle Jammal Brown, Bushrod became a starter for the Saints in 2009, helping the Saints to their first and only Super Bowl Championship. On April 13, 2010, signed a one-year contract to return to the team. Bushrod led the NFL in snaps played in the 2011 season with 1,177. On July 29, 2011, Bushrod signed a 2-year contract with the New Orleans Saints, where he was a Pro Bowler in 2011 and 2012.

=== Chicago Bears ===
Bushrod signed a five-year deal worth $35 million with the Chicago Bears on March 12, 2013. Bushrod was released on February 16, 2016.

=== Miami Dolphins ===
On March 10, 2016, Bushrod signed with the Miami Dolphins and served as their starting right guard. Bushrod was the starting right guard during the 2016 season leading the way for Jay Ajayi to rush for 1,278 yards.

On March 16, 2017, Bushrod re-signed with the Dolphins. He started 10 games in 2017 before suffering a foot injury in Week 11. He missed the next four games before being placed on injured reserve on December 20, 2017.

=== New Orleans Saints (second stint) ===
On March 15, 2018, Bushrod signed a one-year contract with the Saints. He was released on September 8, 2018, but was re-signed four days later. He started five games at left tackle in place of an injured Terron Armstead.

On August 29, 2019, Bushrod announced his retirement from the NFL.
