= Lady Jersey =

Lady Jersey may refer to:

- Frances Villiers, Countess of Jersey (1753–1821)
- Sarah Villiers, Countess of Jersey (1785–1867)
- Margaret Child-Villiers, Countess of Jersey (1849–1945)
