= King George County, Virginia =

County in Virginia, United States

- County
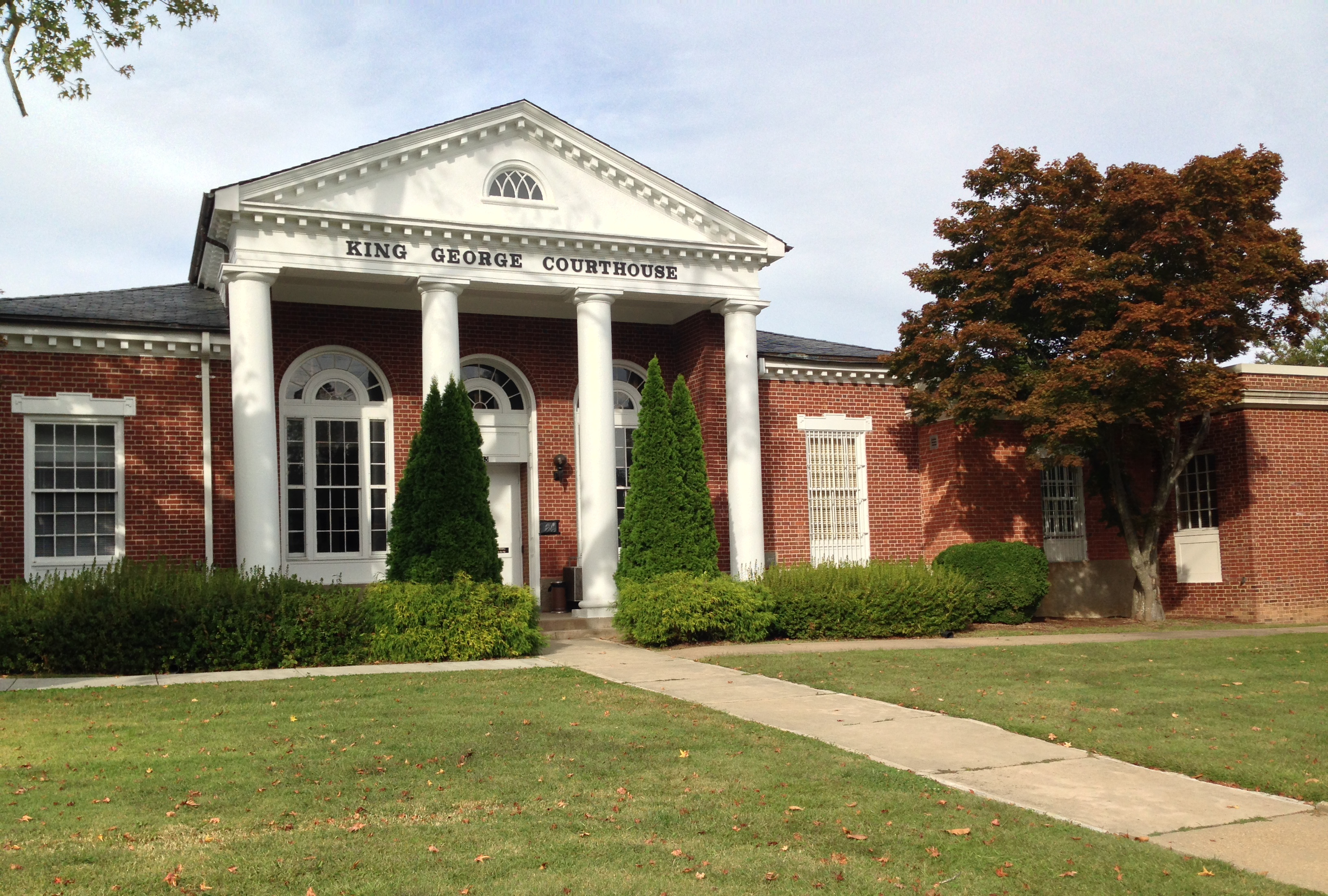
- King George County Courthouse

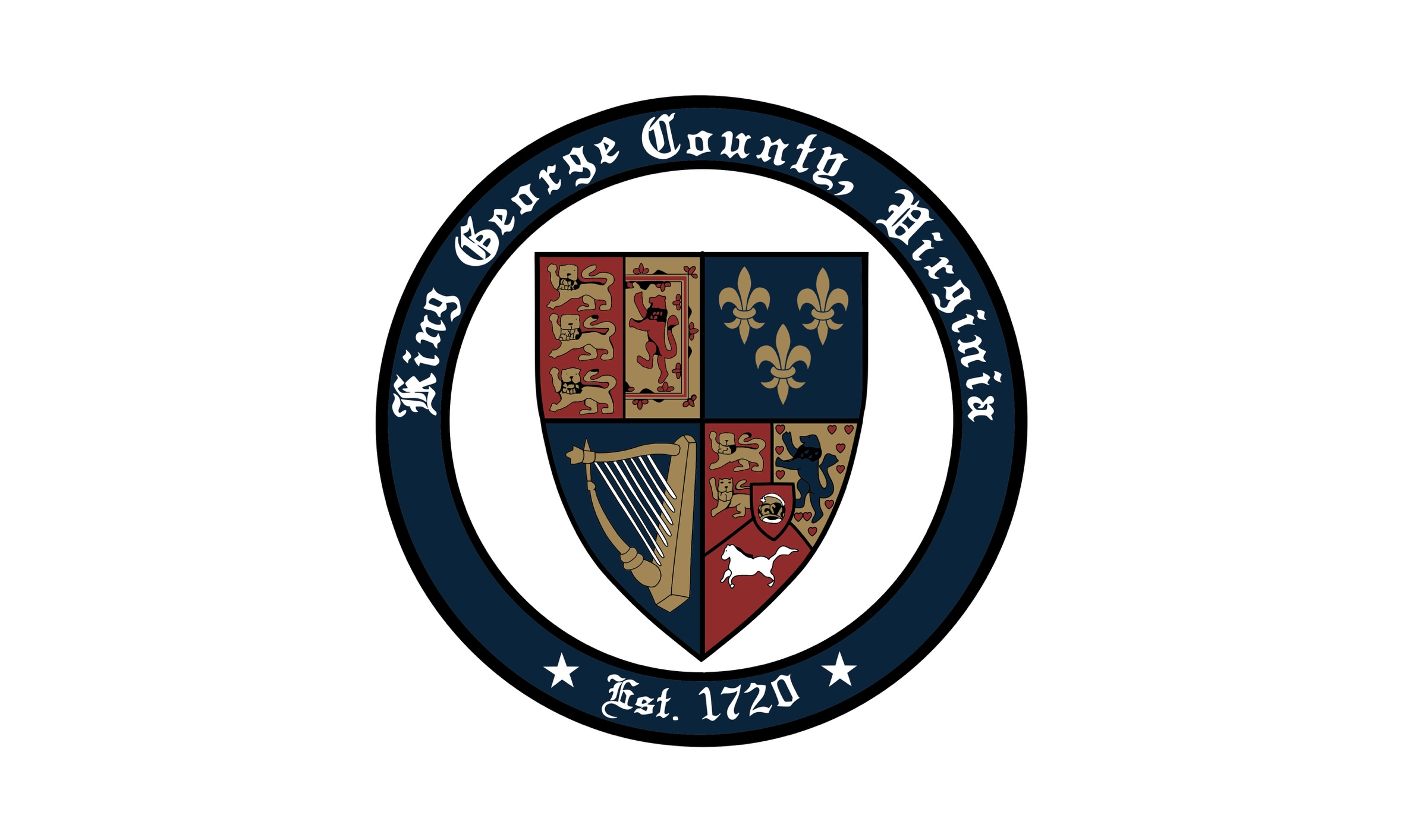
- Flag Seal

- Location within the U.S. state of Virginia
- Coordinates: 38°16′N 77°09′W
- Country: United States
- State: Virginia
- Founded: 1720
- Named for: George I
- Seat: King George
- Largest CDP: King George

Area
  - Total: 188 sq mi (490 km^{2})
  - Land: 180 sq mi (470 km^{2})
  - Water: 21 sq mi (54 km^{2}) 4.3%

Population (2020)
  - Total: 26,723
  - Estimate (2025): 29,646 ▲
  - Density: 150/sq mi (57/km^{2})
- Time zone: UTC−5 (Eastern)
  - Summer (DST): UTC−4 (EDT)
- Congressional district: 7th
- Website: kinggeorgecountyva.gov

King George County is a county located in the Commonwealth of Virginia. As of the 2020 census, the population sits at 26,723. Its county seat is the census designated place of King George. The county's largest employer is the U.S. Naval Surface Warfare Center Dahlgren Division. It is adjacent to the newly built, four-lane, 2-mile-long (3.2 km) Harry W. Nice Memorial Bridge carrying U.S. Highway 301 over the Potomac River. It contains the ZIP codes 22448 (Dahlgren) and 22485 (all other areas within King George). It is within the area code 540 and contains the exchanges: 775, 644, 663, and 653.

== History ==
King George County was established in 1720 when land was split from Richmond County, Virginia. The county is named for King George I of Great Britain. It was substantially reorganized in 1776 and 1777, with land swapped with both Stafford and Westmoreland counties to form the modern boundaries.

In the early decades, planters cultivated tobacco, a labor-intensive commodity crop, depending on the labor of both indentured servants from Britain and enslaved Africans. Gradually slaves became the primary laborers, as fewer indentured servants arrived. Later mixed crops were introduced, as the land had gotten exhausted from tobacco cultivation. The county and state were dominated by slavery.

On March 16, 1751, James Madison, the fourth President of the United States, was born at Belle Grove plantation, the childhood home of his mother, Eleanor Rose "Nellie" Conway. Like other women, she returned home to her mother for assistance when bearing her child. The plantation is located in Port Conway in southern King George County. Nellie Conway was the daughter of its owner, Francis Conway, for whom the town of Port Conway was named. William "Extra Billy" Smith, twice elected governor of Virginia, was born at Marengo, Virginia in 1797.

On May 1, 1861, during the American Civil War, Confederates installed artillery at Mathias Point in order to blockade the Potomac River. On June 27, the steamer Thomas Freeborn bombarded Mathias Point in an effort to drive away the soldiers who were manning the weapons. Confederate soldiers fired back from Mathias Point, striking and mortally wounding Commander James H. Ward of the Freeborn. He was the first Union naval officer to die in the Civil War.

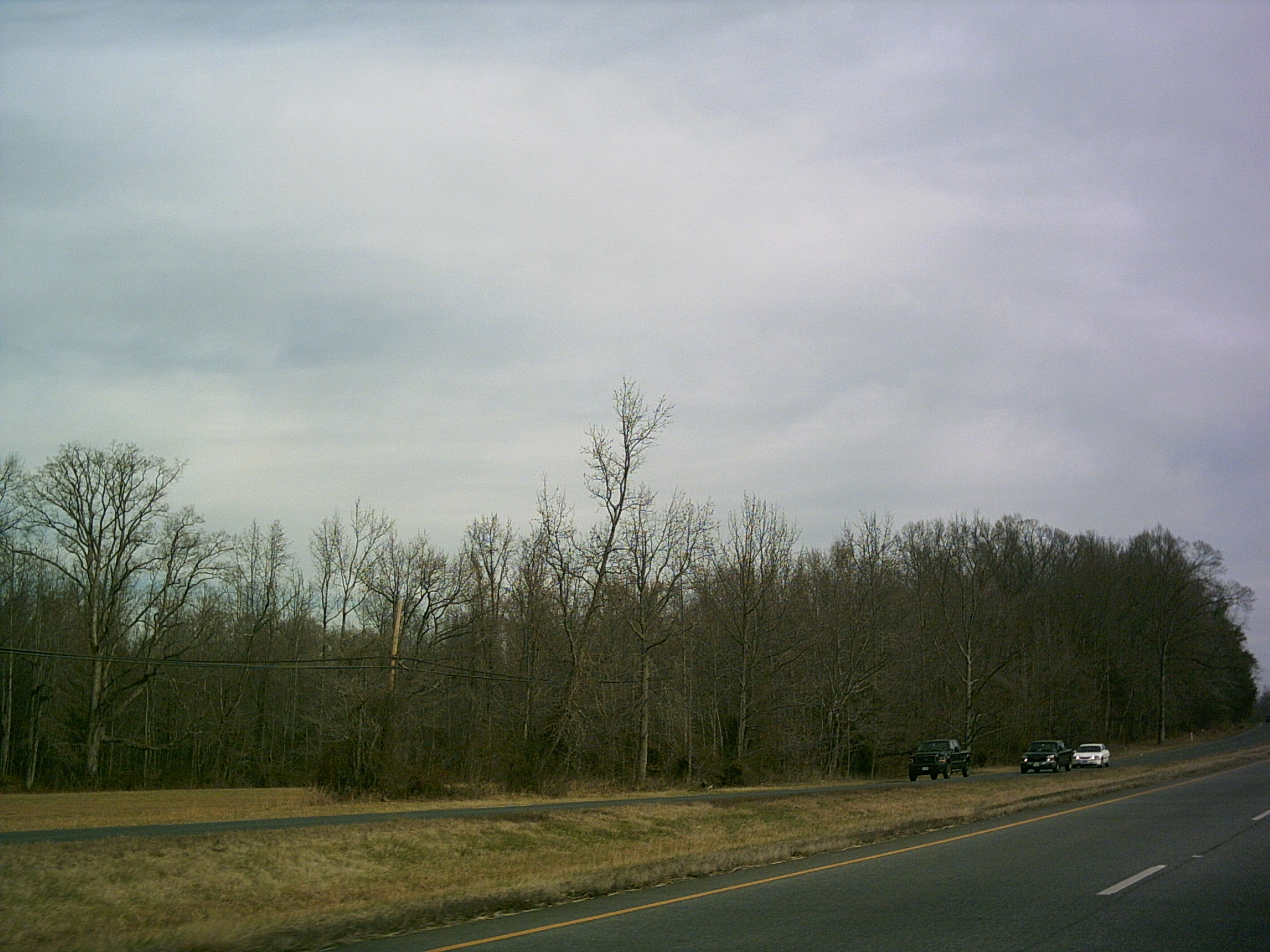
Landscape in King George County

After assassinating President Abraham Lincoln, John Wilkes Booth and David Herold tried to elude Union cavalry and crossed into the Virginia county by boat from Maryland on April 21, 1865. Booth and Herold landed at the mouth of Gambo Creek, before meeting with Confederate agents, who guided their passage to Port Conway. From there they crossed into Port Royal, in Caroline County.

== Geography ==
According to the U.S. Census Bureau, the county has a total area of 188 square miles (490 km^{2}), of which 180 square miles (470 km^{2}) is land and 8 square miles (21 km^{2}) (4.3%) is water.

King George County is located on the Northern Neck and is bounded on the north by the Potomac River, which lies in Charles County, Maryland. It is bounded on the south by the Rappahannock River, across which lie Caroline and Essex counties; on the east by Westmoreland County and on the west by Stafford County, all in Virginia.

=== National protected area ===
- Rappahannock River Valley National Wildlife Refuge (part)- Bishop, Styer, and Toby's Point units

=== Major highways ===
- US 301
- SR 3
- SR 205
- SR 206
- SR 218

== Demographics ==
Historical population
Census	Pop.	Note	%±
1790	7,366		—
1800	6,749		−8.4%
1810	6,454		−4.4%
1820	6,116		−5.2%
1830	6,397		4.6%
1840	5,927		−7.3%
1850	5,971		0.7%
1860	6,571		10.0%
1870	5,742		−12.6%
1880	6,397		11.4%
1890	6,641		3.8%
1900	6,918		4.2%
1910	6,378		−7.8%
1920	5,762		−9.7%
1930	5,297		−8.1%
1940	5,431		2.5%
1950	6,710		23.5%
1960	7,243		7.9%
1970	8,039		11.0%
1980	10,543		31.1%
1990	13,527		28.3%
2000	16,803		24.2%
2010	23,584		40.4%
2020	26,723		13.3%
2025 (est.)	29,646	▲	10.9%
U.S. Decennial Census 2010 2020

=== Racial and ethnic composition ===
King George County, Virginia – Racial and ethnic composition Note: the US Census treats Hispanic/Latino as an ethnic category. This table excludes Latinos from the racial categories and assigns them to a separate category. Hispanics/Latinos may be of any race.
Race / Ethnicity (NH = Non-Hispanic)	Pop 1980	Pop 1990	Pop 2000	Pop 2010	Pop 2020	% 1980	% 1990	% 2000	% 2010	% 2020
White alone (NH)	7,998	10,490	12,856	17,603	18,709	75.86%	77.55%	76.51%	74.64%	70.01%
Black or African American alone (NH)	2,384	2,724	3,136	4,177	3,919	22.61%	20.14%	18.66%	17.71%	14.67%
Native American or Alaska Native alone (NH)	13	37	72	101	153	0.12%	0.27%	0.43%	0.43%	0.57%
Asian alone (NH)	69	117	167	268	401	0.65%	0.86%	0.99%	1.14%	1.50%
Native Hawaiian or Pacific Islander alone (NH)	x	x	11	10	13	x	x	0.07%	0.04%	0.05%
Other race alone (NH)	3	3	26	41	147	0.03%	0.02%	0.15%	0.17%	0.55%
Mixed race or Multiracial (NH)	x	x	234	594	1,799	x	x	1.39%	2.52%	6.73%
Hispanic or Latino (any race)	76	156	301	790	1,582	0.72%	1.15%	1.79%	3.35%	5.92%
Total	10,543	13,527	16,803	23,584	26,723	100.00%	100.00%	100.00%	100.00%	100.00%

=== 2020 census ===
As of the 2020 census, the county had a population of 26,723. The median age was 38.3 years. 25.4% of residents were under the age of 18 and 13.9% of residents were 65 years of age or older. For every 100 females there were 100.1 males, and for every 100 females age 18 and over there were 98.8 males age 18 and over.

The racial makeup of the county was 71.6% White, 14.9% Black or African American, 0.7% American Indian and Alaska Native, 1.6% Asian, 0.1% Native Hawaiian and Pacific Islander, 1.9% from some other race, and 9.3% from two or more races. Hispanic or Latino residents of any race comprised 5.9% of the population.

0.0% of residents lived in urban areas, while 100.0% lived in rural areas.

There were 9,548 households in the county, of which 36.5% had children under the age of 18 living with them and 20.1% had a female householder with no spouse or partner present. About 20.9% of all households were made up of individuals and 7.7% had someone living alone who was 65 years of age or older.

There were 10,322 housing units, of which 7.5% were vacant. Among occupied housing units, 75.6% were owner-occupied and 24.4% were renter-occupied. The homeowner vacancy rate was 1.2% and the rental vacancy rate was 7.3%.

=== 2010 census ===
As of the census of 2010, there were 23,584 people, 9,411 households, and 4,525 families residing in the county. The population density was 93 people per square mile (36 people/km^{2}). There were 6,820 housing units at an average density of 38 units per square mile (15 units/km^{2}). The racial makeup of the county was 76.7% White, 17.9% Black or African American, 0.5% Native American, 1.2% Asian, 0.1% Pacific Islander, 0.8% from other races, and 2.9% from two or more races. 3.3% of the population were Hispanic or Latino of any race.

There were 6,091 households, out of which 38.00% had children under the age of 18 living with them, 59.50% were married couples living together, 10.50% had a female householder with no husband present, and 25.70% were non-families. 20.40% of all households were made up of individuals, and 6.00% had someone living alone who was 65 years of age or older. The average household size was 2.70 and the average family size was 3.12.

In the county, the population was spread out, with 27.80% under the age of 18, 8.20% from 18 to 24, 31.70% from 25 to 44, 22.70% from 45 to 64, and 9.60% who were 65 years of age or older. The median age was 35 years. For every 100 females, there were 101.00 males. For every 100 females aged 18 and over, there were 99.40 males.

The median income for a household in the county was $49,882, and the median income for a family was $55,160. Males had a median income of $38,600 versus $26,350 for females. The per capita income for the county was $21,562. About 4.40% of families and 5.60% of the population were below the poverty line, including 6.10% of those under age 18 and 6.40% of those age 65 or over.

== Government ==
=== Board of Supervisors ===
- County Administrator: Matthew Smolnik
- Member (At Large): David Sullins (Chairman)
- Member (Shiloh): Cathy Binder
- Member (Madison): Ken Stroud
- Member (Monroe): Bryan Metts
- Member (Dahlgren): William Davis (Vice Chairman)

=== Constitutional officers ===
- Clerk of the Circuit Court: Jessica Mattingly (I)
- Commissioner of the Revenue: Regina Puckett (I)
- Commonwealth's Attorney: Keri Gusman (I)
- Sheriff: Christopher A Giles(I)
- Treasurer: Randy Jones (I)
- Soil and Water conservation district tri-city and county: Anthony Staats (I), Janet Gayle Harris (I)

== Politics ==
King George is represented by Republican Richard Stuart in the Virginia Senate, Republican Hillary Pugh Kent in the Virginia House of Delegates, and Democrat Eugene Vindman in the U.S. House of Representatives.

United States presidential election results for King George County, Virginia
Year	Republican		Democratic		Third party(ies)	
Year	No.	%	No.	%	No.	%
1912	48	11.79%	256	62.90%	103	25.31%
1916	217	48.98%	223	50.34%	3	0.68%
1920	253	50.30%	249	49.50%	1	0.20%
1924	206	40.95%	280	55.67%	17	3.38%
1928	413	57.20%	309	42.80%	0	0.00%
1932	203	29.77%	475	69.65%	4	0.59%
1936	295	38.51%	469	61.23%	2	0.26%
1940	167	24.45%	515	75.40%	1	0.15%
1944	340	49.28%	348	50.43%	2	0.29%
1948	316	43.89%	248	34.44%	156	21.67%
1952	577	52.94%	503	46.15%	10	0.92%
1956	655	51.70%	563	44.44%	49	3.87%
1960	685	48.58%	717	50.85%	8	0.57%
1964	644	37.25%	1,085	62.75%	0	0.00%
1968	829	37.77%	730	33.26%	636	28.97%
1972	1,675	70.05%	658	27.52%	58	2.43%
1976	1,383	46.75%	1,513	51.15%	62	2.10%
1980	1,784	53.54%	1,318	39.56%	230	6.90%
1984	2,356	61.34%	1,450	37.75%	35	0.91%
1988	2,587	62.40%	1,519	36.64%	40	0.96%
1992	2,570	48.27%	1,811	34.02%	943	17.71%
1996	2,597	53.62%	1,875	38.72%	371	7.66%
2000	3,590	61.35%	2,070	35.37%	192	3.28%
2004	5,124	64.69%	2,739	34.58%	58	0.73%
2008	5,888	56.22%	4,473	42.71%	113	1.08%
2012	6,604	58.31%	4,477	39.53%	244	2.15%
2016	7,341	60.88%	4,007	33.23%	711	5.90%
2020	8,446	59.38%	5,404	37.99%	374	2.63%
2024	9,500	61.54%	5,657	36.65%	280	1.81%

== Festivals ==
The King George Fall Festival is held the second weekend of October in King George. All proceeds from this event go to support the Volunteer King George Fire & Rescue.

The Fall Festival also includes a parade through town, a carnival, a craft fair, a car show, a dance, a 5-K run, and the Fall Festival Queens Pageant. The King George Fall Festival began in October 1959.

== Communities ==
=== Census-designated places ===
- Dahlgren
- Dahlgren Center
- Fairview Beach
- King George
- Passapatanzy

=== Other unincorporated communities ===
- Berthaville
- Dogue
- Hampstead
- Jersey
- Ninde
- Owens
- Port Conway
- Rollins Fork
- Sealston
- Shiloh
- Weedonville

== Education ==
King George County Schools serves all parts of the county for grades PK-12, except for those within Naval Surface Warfare Center Dahlgren Division, which are served by the Department of Defense Education Activity (DoDEA). The DoDEA property has a single PreK-8 school, Dahlgren Elementary Middle School.

== Notable people ==
- James Madison, fourth President of the United States
- Francis Dade, US Army officer, killed at the Dade Battle in the Second Seminole War
- Mark Warner, US Senator, maintains a residence and farm
- Krystal Ball, political talk show co-host and one-time Congressional candidate, grew up in King George
- Collette Wolfe, actress, grew up in King George, Virginia
- Jermon Bushrod, tackle for the New Orleans Saints in the National Football League (NFL), grew up in King George, Virginia
- Al Bumbry, Major League Baseball Player
- Nell Zink, American novelist, grew up in King George County
- Dorthia Cottrell, musician, grew up in King George County
- Philip Scholz, author and former Paralympic swimmer.
- Gladys West, Black American Mathematician, United States Air Force hall of fame inductee, for help development of satellite geodesy which was later used to create the Global Positioning System (GPS)
- Thomas Lomax Hunter, poet, lawyer, and newspaper columnist.

== See also ==
- Caledon State Park
- National Register of Historic Places listings in King George County, Virginia
- Northern Neck George Washington Birthplace AVA
