= National Register of Historic Places listings in Caroline County, Virginia =

Location of Caroline County in Virginia

This is a list of the National Register of Historic Places listings in Caroline County, Virginia.

This is intended to be a complete list of the properties and districts on the National Register of Historic Places in Caroline County, Virginia, United States. The locations of National Register properties and districts for which the latitude and longitude coordinates are included below, may be seen in an online map.

There are 22 properties and districts listed on the National Register in the county, including 1 National Historic Landmark.

This National Park Service list is complete through NPS recent listings posted March 6, 2026.

== Current listings ==
| | Name on the Register | Image | Date listed | Location | City or town | Description |
|---|---|---|---|---|---|---|
| 1 | Auburn | Auburn | May 3, 2006 (#06000342) | 320 N. Main St. 38°03′26″N 77°21′19″W | Bowling Green | |
| 2 | Bowling Green Historic District | Bowling Green Historic District | May 22, 2003 (#03000439) | Roughly along and bounded by U.S. Route 301, Broadus Ave., Lakewood Rd., N. Main St., and Paige Rd. 38°03′00″N 77°20′48″W | Bowling Green | |
| 3 | Camden | Camden | November 12, 1969 (#69000228) | Northern end of Camden Rd. 38°09′48″N 77°09′41″W | Port Royal | |
| 4 | Caroline County Courthouse | Caroline County Courthouse | May 25, 1973 (#73001999) | Main St. and Courthouse Ln. 38°03′04″N 77°20′49″W | Bowling Green | |
| 5 | Edge Hill | Edge Hill | February 10, 1983 (#83003264) | West of Woodford on Edgehill Academy Rd. 38°07′05″N 77°27′35″W | Woodford | |
| 6 | Gay Mont | Gay Mont | May 19, 1972 (#72001387) | Off U.S. Route 17 near its junction with U.S. Route 301; 38°10′26″N 77°13′49″W | Port Royal | |
| 7 | Grace Episcopal Church | Grace Episcopal Church | January 14, 2019 (#100003313) | 4565 Fredericksburg Turnpike; 38°11′56″N 77°23′17″W | Corbin | |
| 8 | Green Falls | Green Falls | May 23, 1997 (#97000485) | Junction of Old Stage Rd. and the Mattaponi Trail; 37°57′13″N 77°18′39″W | Bowling Green | |
| 9 | The Grove | The Grove | May 21, 2009 (#09000333) | 33115 Mount Gideon Rd. 37°48′34″N 77°22′06″W | Hanover | |
| 10 | Hazelwood | Hazelwood | January 11, 1974 (#74002111) | Off Hazelwood Rd. 38°11′07″N 77°13′52″W | Port Royal | |
| 11 | Jericho School | Jericho School | February 11, 2004 (#04000041) | Jericho Rd. 37°55′45″N 77°30′42″W | Ruther Glen | |
| 12 | The Meadow Historic District | The Meadow Historic District | May 26, 2015 (#15000276) | 13111 Dawn Boulevard; 37°51′08″N 77°25′14″W | Doswell | |
| 13 | Moss Neck Manor | Moss Neck Manor | January 27, 1999 (#99000069) | Burma Rd. on the southern side of the Rappahannock River; 38°12′31″N 77°19′32″W | Rappahannock Academy | |
| 14 | Mount Gideon | | February 27, 2020 (#100005012) | 33295 Mt. Gideon Rd. 37°48′12″N 77°22′03″W | Hanover | |
| 15 | Old Jail of Caroline County | Old Jail of Caroline County | February 25, 2020 (#100005008) | 119 North Main St. 38°03′03″N 77°20′48″W | Bowling Green | |
| 16 | Old Mansion | Old Mansion | November 12, 1969 (#69000227) | South of the junction of U.S. Route 301 and State Route 207; 38°02′39″N 77°20′51″W | Bowling Green | |
| 17 | Port Royal Historic District | Port Royal Historic District | February 16, 1970 (#70000786) | Roughly bounded by the Rappahannock River, Roys Run, U.S. Route 17, and Goldenville Creek; 38°10′10″N 77°11′29″W | Port Royal | |
| 18 | Prospect Hill | Prospect Hill | December 12, 1976 (#76002096) | Southeast of Fredericksburg off U.S. Route 17; 38°13′32″N 77°21′55″W | Fredericksburg | |
| 19 | Riverview | Riverview | July 29, 1994 (#94000792) | Water St. 38°10′15″N 77°11′16″W | Port Royal | |
| 20 | Santee | Santee | May 7, 1979 (#79003034) | Off Pepmeier Hill Rd. 38°13′10″N 77°21′37″W | Corbin | |
| 21 | Spring Grove | Spring Grove | December 12, 1976 (#76002097) | 1.5 miles (2.4 km) southwest of Oak Corner along Mattaponi Trail; 37°58′41″N 77°19′55″W | Oak Corner | |
| 22 | Townfield | Townfield | July 29, 1994 (#94000791) | Water St. 38°10′13″N 77°11′17″W | Port Royal | |

== See also ==
- List of National Historic Landmarks in Virginia
- National Register of Historic Places listings in Virginia
