= John Tayloe Lomax =

American judge (1781–1862)

Associate Justice and Circuit Judge

Personal details
- Born: January 19, 1781 Port Tobago, Caroline County, Virginia
- Died: October 1, 1862 (aged 81) Fredericksburg, Virginia, U.S.
- Spouse: Charlotte Belson Thornton
- Children: 10
- Education: St. John's College (BA)
- Profession: Professor of Law University of Virginia

John Tayloe Lomax (January 19, 1781 – October 1, 1862) was a Virginia lawyer and jurist.

== Early life and education ==
John Tayloe Lomax was born on January 19, 1781, in Port Tobago, Caroline County, Virginia, to the Anne (née Corbin) and Thomas Lomax. The family included an older daughter who never married, Judith Lomax (1774–1828), and sons Thomas Lunsford Lomax (1778–1805) and Mann Page Lomax (1787–1842; who would join the U.S. Army and retire with the rank of Major). Lomax graduated from St. John's College in Annapolis in 1797 with a Bachelor of Arts. Upon returning to Virginia, Lomax read law.

== Career ==
Admitted to the Virginia bar, Lomax began practicing law at Port Royal, Virginia, the Caroline County seat. He moved to Fredericksburg, the city which had the appellate court for the region, in 1805. In 1809 he settled at Menokin plantation on Virginia's Northern Neck, which his grandfather had built for another daughter in Westmoreland County, where he remained nine years.

In the War of 1812, he served as a colonel in the U.S. Army. In 1818, Lomax returned to Fredericksburg and in 1826 moved to Charlottesville after accepting appointment as professor of the University of Virginia School of Law. He was the university's third chairman of the faculty, serving from 1827 until 1828.

In 1830, the Virginia General Assembly unanimously elected Lomax to the circuit court of the state. Upon Virginia's adoption of a new Constitution in 1851, legislators again chose Lomax as the judge of the circuit, though he did not seek another term after the expiration of that six year term. The convention that framed this constitution had adopted a clause disqualifying any person over seventy years of age from holding the office of judge; but at the request of members of the bar this provision was cancelled so as not to exclude Lomax.

Lomax wrote Digest of the Laws respecting Real Property generally Adopted and in Use in the United States (3 vols., Philadelphia, 1839; 2nd edition, revised and enlarged, Richmond, 1856) and a Treatise on the Law of Executors and Administrators generally in Use in the United States (2 vols., 1841; 2nd ed., Richmond, 1856). He continued on the bench until his resignation in December 1856, when he retired to private life.

== Personal life ==
Lomax married Charlotte Belson Thornton (1784–1793) of Northumberland County, descended from the First Families of Virginia, who survived him by about a year. They had ten children, of whom eight were daughters. Presley Thornton Lomax (1820–1893) would move to Keokuk, Iowa, where he died.

Lomax owned seven slaves in 1850, four of them Black women of childbearing years, as well a 10 year old Black Girl, a Black man aged 35 years and a 3 year old Black boy. Since his biography does not mention living in Richmond, the state capital, he may not be the John T. Lomax who owned 17 slaves and who lived with his family there a year before the death of this man's father. Oddly, he does not appear in either the 1820 nor 1830 census either, although his widowed mother, Ann C. Lomax, lived with two younger women and 4 slaves (the youngest a woman between 14 and 25 years old) in Caroline County in 1820 and lived in Fredericksburg with those women and a young white grandson or servant and six slaves in 1830. Because of her death suring that decade, Lomax might be John F. Lomax who lived in the St.Georges District of Spotsylvania County in 1840 and owned 11 slaves. He appears in the 1860 census living with his 16 year old son and 12 year old daughter and owning $27,000 of real estate and $60,000 of other property. but no corresponding slave schedule.

== Death ==
Lomax died in Fredericksburg on October 1, 1862.

== Awards ==
In 1847, Harvard Law School awarded him an honorary LL.D.

== Sources ==
- Appletons' Cyclopedia of American Biography, vol. IV (copyright expired)
- Mathew Fontaine Maury The Pathfinder of the Seas by Charles Lee Lewis, United States Naval Institute, Annapolis, Maryland, 1927, ref p. 41 (1841)
