= Alexander M. Beatty =

Medal of Honor recipient (1828–1907)

Alexander M. Beattie
- Born: July 29, 1828; Ryegate, Vermont
- Died: March 7, 1907 (aged 78)
- Military career
- Allegiance: United States of America
- Branch: United States Army; Union Army
- Service years: 1861 – 1864
- Rank: Captain
- Unit: 3rd Regiment Vermont Volunteer Infantry - Company F
- Conflicts: American Civil War
- Awards: Medal of Honor

Alexander Mitchell Beattie (often misspelled Beatty) (July 29, 1828 – March 7, 1907) was a Union Army soldier during the American Civil War. He received the Medal of Honor for valor at the Battle of Cold Harbor during the American Civil War.

== Biography ==
Alexander Mitchell Beattie was born in Ryegate, VT on July 29, 1828. He was the eleventh child and sixth son of James M. Beattie (January 12, 1776 – December 30, 1866) and Margaret Jane Gillespie Beattie (1789–1862). His parents were immigrants who were both born in Ulster, Ireland (his father was born in Britton Walls, Co. Antrim). His father came to America in 1801, initially to Armenia, NY, before moving to Ryegate, a town sponsored by the Scottish-American Company of Farmers in 1804. He was a member of Reformed Presbyterian Church of Scotland, also known as Covenanters, and joined the congregation there and later became a deacon. He sold Irish linen throughout Vermont before moving his business to Richmond, VA. Returning to Ryegate in 1807, to buy some woodland, he cleared the land and built a farm, marrying Margaret, a niece of the minister in 1808.

Beattie was educated at Peacham and St. Johnsbury Academies. He taught school in St Johnsbury through his twenties until he moved to California to work in business and mining in 1857. He only stayed a year before returning to St. Johnsbury and to work in his brothers', David and Thomas's lumber business in Maidstone, VT. A respected 32-year-old businessman and local leader, like his brothers, he was a War Democrat. At the start of hostilities, he recruited a company of lumbermen for the war effort.

== Military service ==
Serving in the Union Army from June 1861 until July 1864, Beatty enlisted his company in the 3rd Vermont Infantry and received a 2nd Lieutenant's commission on June 11, 1861. His company became Company I, under the command of Capt. Thomas Nelson, and was sworn into federal service with the regiment at Camp Baxter, St. Johnsbury, (Note: This property was the county fairgrounds of the Caledonia County Agricultural Society, just south of the town amed in honor of Adjutant and Inspector General H. Henry Baxter.) on July 16, 1861.

=== 1861 ===
With 881 of his comrades in the 3rd Vermont, Beattie departed for Washington, D.C., on Wednesday, July 24, on a train of 22 cars. (Note: Because the 3rd took longer to organize and fill out, it did not missed the Battle of First Bull Run unlike its future brigade mates.) With stops at Bellows Falls, Springfield, Hartford, New York, and Philadelphia, the regiment arrived two days later in Washington. In Washington, Beattie got a new regimental commander, Col. William F. Smith. (Note: Smith, known to his friends as "Baldy", was born at St. Albans, Vermont and graduated fourth of 41 the West Point class of 1845. Smith was appointed to the Topographical Engineers Corps. His service in the war would be noted for the extremes of glory and blame, notably success in the Peninsula, Maryland, and Chattanooga campaigns and failure at Fredricksburg and Petersburg. For more information, see his Wikipedia article.) The regiment stayed at Camp Lyon, on Georgetown Heights until Saturday, July 27, when it marched up the Potomac to the Chain Bridge. Once across, they moved into Camp Lyon. They joined at that site the 6th Maine Infantry, a battery, and a company of cavalry. By August 12, the 2nd Vermont Infantry and the 33rd New York Infantry had joined them. In command of the camp, Smith was soon promoted to brigadier general of volunteers, so Beattie saw his third regimental commander within a month, as its lieutenant colonel, Breed N. Hyde, took command.

For many weeks in the early fall, Beattie and Company I saw duty erecting earthworks and turning the camp into a fort. On Tuesday, September 11, with the regiment, Company I participated in a reconnaissance to and beyond Lewinsville, Virginia, where it engaged Confederate skirmishers.. Returning to the camp, it came under fire from a Rebel battery, losing one man killed, one mortally wounded, and injuring five others. Two weeks later another reconnaissance to Lewinsville resulted in no contact and no casualties..

During the next two weeks, the 4th and 5th Vermont regiments joined Smith's division. On Wednesday, October 9, the Vermont regiments moved to Camp Griffin, about four miles from Chain Bridge. Here, on October 24, the 6th Vermont Infantry arrived. By now, Beattie and the 3rd were in a brigade commanded by an Ohioan William T. H. Brooks (Note: William Thomas Harbaugh Brooks was an 1841 graduate of West Point, who had seen combat in both the Second Seminole War and the Mexican–American War. He had been on garrison duty at Fort Hamilton, New York when the Southern states seceded. For More information, see his Wikipedia article.) in a division now commanded by Smith. Between June and September, for a time, the brigade also included the 26th New Jersey Infantry. (Note: The 26th, a two-year regiment, would remain a member of the brigade until they departed to muster out in June 1863.) Through Smith's efforts, the 6th Vermont was added, completing the initial organization of the "Old Vermont Brigade," at that time, the only brigade in the Army of the Potomac made up of regiments from one state.

Beattie continued to serve in Company I through the fall and must have demonstrated his ability as he was promoted to First Lieutenant of the company on Thursday, November 7. Through the remainder of the fall and into the winter, Beattie remained with his company at Camp Griffin training, erecting fortifications, and serving in garrison in the defenses of Washington.

=== 1862 ===
In the spring of 1862, on March 10, Beattie went with his regiment down the river to Alexandria.. After almost a fortnight, he boarded a transport with his company on Sunday March 23, and arrived down the Chesapeake Bay at Fortress Monroe the next day.. On the peninsula, in April, his brigade was incorporated into the Army of the Potomac (AoP) as the 2nd Brigade, 2nd Division, VI Corps, commanded by Maj. Gen. William B. Franklin and took part in Maj. Gen. George B. McClellan's Peninsula Campaign.

Beattie first saw action in the Battle at Lee's Mill on April 16, 1862, when McClellan had Smith send a force to seize and occupy Garrow Ridge at Lee's Mill, overlooking Dam No. 1 on the Warwick River to prevent the Rebels from conducting further work on a fort they were building at the river's edge. Beattie and Company I, along with five other 3rd Vermont companies and three other regiments advanced to the stone walls along the river and opened fire on Rebel artillery across the creek rapidly driving them off and suppressing the return musketry from rifle pits held by the 15th North Carolina. At 3:00 p.m., 192 men from companies D, F, E, and K dashed across the river and captured the rifle pits. Despite prior promises, no reinforcements followed and the four companies and their compatriots along the stone walls across the river watched anxiously as Confederate forces gathered. When the inevitable counterattack struck thirty minutes later these men were driven back across the river with great losses. While Beattie and Company I were unscathed in the action, the small force that crossed suffered 92 casualties. (Note: The debacle was received coolly in Vermont, and Smith faced a severe criticism for his failure that led to an investigation by a Vermont senator.)

Beattie next fought at Battle of Williamsburg where the Vermont Brigade was sent to reinforce Maj. Gen. Hancock's successful attack on the right. As the army neared Richmond, Beattie and his company spent almost a month on fatigue and picket duty preparing for the planned siege of the city. All that changed when Lee took command of the Rebels' Army of Northern Virginia (ANV). Seizing the initiative he attacked U.S. forces during a series of engagements known as the Seven Days Battles. Beattie and his men were in heavy fighting at Garnett's & Golding's Farm, Savage's Station (where his company commander as well as brigade commander were wounded),, and at White Oak Swamp. After these defeats, on Tuesday night, July 1, Beattie's division were in reserve in positions on Turkey Creek in Charles City County during the Malvern Hill. That night in the darkness the AoP began a nighttime withdrawal. Beattie and his company retreated to Harrison's Landing arriving early on the morning of July 2. Beattie would remain there with his regiment until August 16 when they moved to Fortress Monroe to board transports back to Alexandria.

VI Corps remained at Alexandria during Pope's Virginia Campaign and were reunited with the rest of the army for the Maryland campaign, Lee's invasion. After Lee invaded Maryland, McClellan learned that Lee had split his forces from a copy of an order, known as Special Order 191, that his troops had found. (Note: While McClellan was moving to intercept Lee, two Union soldiers (Cpl. Barton W. Mitchell (later killed at Antietam) and First Sergeant John M. Bloss (later wounded at Antietam) of the 27th Indiana Volunteer Infantry) discovered a mislaid copy of Lee's detailed battle plans wrapped around three cigars. The orders showed Lee had divided army and dispersed his army making each subject to isolation and defeat if McClellan could move quickly enough. McClellan waited about 18 hours before deciding to take advantage of this intelligence and reposition his forces, thus squandering an opportunity to defeat Lee decisively. For more information see the Battle of Antietam Wikipedia article here.) To counter him, McClellan moved west to go over South Mountain, part of the Blue Ridge mountains, and strike isolated parts of Lee's army. Beattie, in the 3rd Vermont, was in the Left Wing, under Franklin, within the VI Corps. Lee soon found out about the orders and quickly recalled Longstreet to reinforce the South Mountain passes of the Blue Ridge mountains to block McClellan's advance. Brooks had recovered from his wounds and resumed command of his brigade, and under him, Beattie and his company were part of the force sent to take the southernmost pass, Crampton's Gap. On Sunday, September 14, Beattie was with the 3rd as the brigade charged up South Mountain led by the 4th Vermont. Despite artillery fire, the brigade had taken the summit and captured the 16th Virginia Infantry's colors. (Note: The Confederate defenses at two passes through the mountains delayed McClellan's advance enough for Lee to concentrate the remainder of his army at Sharpsburg.) With the passes in hand, on Monday and Tuesday, the AoP moved through and into positions along Antietam Creek. On Wednesday, September 17, Beattie, in VI Corps moved up to Antietam Creek.

Due to their short five-mile march down from the pass, McClellan kept VI Corps in reserve for the morning of the Battle of Antietam (initially on the left and then the center), so Beattie and his company saw no movement until midday. The Rebels had briefly recaptured the high ground in McClellan's center, across the road from the Dunkard Church, that overlooked the sunken road in the ANV's center. Beattie and the 3rd Vermont, commanded by their old commander Maj. Gen. Smith, swept forward into the woods by the church to clear them it. Passing through the carnage littering the cornfield, Beattie and his comrades swept over the hill at a run halting at the end of the cornfield while corps elements cleared the woods by the church and then pulled back in alignment with Beattie's division. After half an hour, VI Corps pulled back a further 200 yards to cover the high ground.

With the high ground in U.S. forces possession, Lee's line was vulnerable, but instead of attacking, McClellan instead started massing his artillery and eventually placing 44 guns on it. Although, Beattie and his men had made no contact with the Rebel infantry as their brigade was in the rear of Smith's advance, they came under severe artillery fire while kept on the high ground protecting the artillery. Beattie's corps' position on the high ground ensured McCellan never lost this ground for the remainder of the battle. With dusk, the battle ended. The next day Beattie and his men remained in their positions on the high ground facing Lee's army, but McClellan did not attack.

After Antietam, Beattie and his regiment went into camp at Hagerstown. Beattie's demonstration of leadership and performance over the Peninsula and Maryland campaigns earned him a promotion to captain on Saturday, October 13. He immediately received command of Company I to relieve Samuel Pingree who had been promoted to major. In Hagerstown, Beattie saw important changes in the corps take place, receiving one of IV Corps' divisions as its 3rd division. His corps commander, Franklin, was promoted to the command of the Left Grand Division, to which VI and I Corps were assigned. His division commander Smith moved up to corps command. General Slocum was promoted to the command of the XII Corps, and Brooks succeeded Slocum in command of the 1st Division, while Brig. Gen. Albion P. Howe succeeded to the command of Smith's (2nd) Division. Brooks, popular with men of the brigade, was relieved by Michigander Col Henry Whiting, commander of the 2nd Vermont, of whom the brigade's men had a less than stellar opinion.

Beattie and his new command remained at Hagerstown until the end of October when the regiment began moving south to Virginia as McClellan shadowed Lee into Virginia. Meanwhile, dissatisfied with McClellan's slow movement, Lincoln relieved himn on Wednesday, November 5, 1862, and replaced him with Major General Burnside. Burnside planned a late fall offensive that the relied on quick movement and deception. Concentrating his army in a visible fashion near Warrenton, he would feign a movement from there toward Richmond, then rapidly shift southeast to Falmouth and cross the Rappahannock River to Fredericksburg, hoping to steal a march on Lee, and advance rapidly along the Richmond, Fredericksburg and Potomac Railroad (RF&P) to Richmond. Washington approved, and Halleck wired Burnside, "The President has just assented to your plan," adding for emphasis: "He thinks that it will succeed if you move rapidly; otherwise not."

With rapid movement key to catching Lee, Beattie and his company, as part of Franklin's Left Grand Division, arrived opposite Fredericksburg at Falmouth on Wednesday, November 19. Since the antebellum bridges connecting the two towns had been destroyed during Johnston's withdrawal a year before, any crossing would need to be done at a ford or with pontoon bridges. Unfortunately for the men of the 3rd Vermont and Burnside, the required pontoons were not ready and would not arrive until the end of November. By the time they arrived, Lee was ensconced in strong defensive positions across the river.

Union engineers began to assemble six pontoon bridges before dawn on Thursday, December 11, three directly across from the city, and three farther south, near the confluence of the Rappahannock and Deep Run that Beattie and his comrades would use. The bridging at the town was a successful, though hotly contested crossing that finished at nightfall. Meanwhile, the bridges south of town were completed by 11:00 a.m. Thursday. While Franklin was ordered at 4:00 p.m. to cross his entire command, only one brigade crossed before dark. Beattie and his brigade mates crossed at dawn and all of Franklin's men were across by 1:00 p.m. Friday. Pushing forward to form a line on the Richmond Stage Road, Beattie and his colleagues found themselves looking across a gully containing the RF&P at Prospect Hill occupied by two divisions of Lt. Gen. Thomas J. "Stonewall" Jackson. (Note: At the start of Burnside's operation, Jackson was in the Shenandoah Valley south of Winchester. Due to the delay of the pontoons, he had moved his corps from the Valley down to Fredericksburg and was Lee's right flank. Maj. Gen. A.P. Hill's and Brig. Gen. William B. Taliaferro's divisions were on the hill opposite Franklin. Maj. Gen. D.H. Hill's and Brig. Gen. Jubal A. Early's divisions were further down river.) Throughout Friday afternoon, fire was exchanged with Confederate skirmishers who had crossed the tracks to probe U.S. Forces. Finding out the size of the force across the railroad, early on Saturday, December 13, Jackson recalled Early and D.H. Hill from down river to rejoin his corps.

Burnside's verbal instructions on Friday to his Grand Division commanders outlined a main attack by Franklin, supported by Hooker, on the southern flank, while Sumner made a secondary attack on the northern flank. When Burnside visited his southern flank st 5:00 p.m. on Friday, Franklin asked for definite orders for a morning attack by the grand division, so he could have adequate time to position his men overnight but received none. When he received them in the morning, he was surprised to find that he would not use his entire force, but only one to seize Prospect Hill.

Saturday, December 13, a cold and overcast day saw the 3rd Vermont and its brigade enveloped in a heavy fog in its position forward of the road slightly downslope with its right anchored on the steep bank of Deep Run. The fog made it impossible for the armies to see each other. The 4,500 men of the Pennsylvania Reserves, the third and smallest a division in I Corps commanded by Maj. Gen. George G. Meade, (Note: I Corpscommander, Reynolds trusted this division despite its size because he had commanded a brigade in it and later the division itself before rising to corps command. For more information see its Wikipedia article.)would make the attack that day. Beattie and his cohort would play a supporting role securing Franklin's right flank. At around 10:30 a.m., the fog started lifting, and Meade began his move. Meade's men moved forward around 1:00 p.m., and despite reaching the crest of the wooded ridge, did not have the force to hold and fell back down to the railroad. To Meade's right, Brig. Gen. John Gibbon's division also attacked, but despite also reaching the crest, also withdrew back across the railroad embankment. Jackson counterattacked with Early's division whose orders to pursue as far as the railroad, were derailed by the chaos as Rebels went as far as the Richmond Stage Road. Union artillery crews and infantry stopped them, and intense combat began to play out astride the railroad.

When Pender's brigade in A. P. Hill's division moved forward, Beattie and the 3rd aided the 2nd in repulsing it. In the afternoon, Law's brigade in Hood's division of Longstreet's corps made an unexpected probe south from Marye's Heights. The 3rd Vermont was sent forward into the Deep Run ravine to meet it. Held in position lying down just inside the ravine, their exposed heads were seen by advancing Rebels who opened fire. The men, eager to open fire, were restrained as enemy was not near enough. Finally, they were ordered to their feet and unleashed a fire that shredded the left of the 16th North Carolina resulting in the 3rd taking sixteen of the regiment prisoner. Beattie and his men's fire combined with that of the rest of the brigade to result in nearly 300 casualties in Pender's brigade. Sporadic musketry continued until nightfall. Through the night, Beattie and his men heard the screams of hundreds of wounded men and horses. Dry sage grass around them caught fire and burned many men alive.

On Sunday, the two armies faced each other but no attacks beyond skirmishing occurred. On Monday, December 14, Beattie and his regiment were relieved and marched back across the pontoons. Beattie and his company went into winter quarters at Falmouth. Baettie's regiment suffered comparatively little compared with the rest of the army with two killed, one mortally wounded, and seven wounded. In fact the men of the 3rd had acquitted themselves well inflicting greater casualties on their foes including taking prisoners. The southern half of the battle, meant to be Burnside's main effort, produced roughly equal casualties (about 4,000 Confederate, 5,000 Union), yet the northern flank, originally intended as a diversion, was a debacle with a lopsided loss ratio of about eight U.S. casualties for each Rebel.

=== 1863 ===
During the winter encampment, Beattie and his brigade was beset by various illnesses, as was the rest of the AoP, that by the start of the new year, only 2760 of the brigade's 3933 were fit for duty. Beattie's regiment in its morning report of January 7, showed an aggregate of 791 men, of whom 573 were present for duty and 204 on the sick list. As the full calamity of the battle became known, Burnside came under strong attacks from politicians and the press. The AoP was rife with recriminations and a lack of confidence in Burnside. Beattie saw his regimental commander, Hyde, court-martialed for cowardice at Fredericksburg. As the proceedings progressed and the result became apparent, Hyde resigned on Thursday, January 15, and was replaced by Thomas O. Seaver. (Note: Seaver had been commanded the brigade's 26th New Jersey for a month since its colonel was ill, and its only remaining field officer having seen no previous service. Under his capable command it rapidly improved in drill and discipline.)

Stung and desperate to restore his reputation and the AoP's morale, he planned for a new offensive, again using feints to distract Lee while he crossed the Rappahannock River south of Fredericksburg. Meanwhile, he would launch a large-scale cavalry strike upriver that would cross and move around and south of Richmond to attack Lee's supply lines in a wide arc to Suffolk held by U.S. forces before returning via ship back to Falmouth. Unfortunately for Burnside, his imaginative and inspired plan was doomed to failure. The cavalry operation was scuppered when it reached river by a telegram from Lincoln forbidding any major army movements without prior approval from the White House. Having kept his plans limited to a small inner circle, he was unaware that some officers within the AoP had gone to Washington to express their lack of confidence in him. After going to Washington and getting approval, Burnside revived his plan with changes. Instead of crossing the Rappahannock south of Fredericksburg, he initially planned to move upstream and cross at U.S. Ford, due north of the Chancellorsville crossroads. (Note: After receiving the telegram, Burnside halted the movement and met with Lincoln told him that two anonymous generals (who were from Beattie's corps and acting with the knowledge of Franklin) had told him about his plans and the army's deteriorating condition. Angrily protesting and demanding these officers' courts-martial, he found Henry Halleck agreed while Lincoln expressed concern over the considerable disconnect between Burnside and his subordinates. Burnside left with his plans approved, but Lincoln sent Halleck to Fredericksburg to assess the situation. Halleck advice to Burnside was little beyond destroying the AVN with the minimum losses. Lincoln also told Burnside to reconsider resigning from the army. For more information, see the Mud March Wikipedia article.)

The offensive began with a westward move on Tuesday, January 20, 1863, in unseasonably mild weather, yet initially the roads Beattie and his men marched on were still hard and frozen. Burnside altered his plan to aim at Banks' Ford for a closer, quicker crossing at dawn, January 21, the engineers pushing five pontoon bridges. After that, two of his grand divisions would be over the river in four hours while the remaining grand division would distract Lee by repeating the December crossing at Fredericksburg. By nightfall on the first day, the roads had thawed and rain began so that by the Wednesday morning, Beattie and his men were marching in a quagmire. Despite fifteen pontoons already on the river, nearly spanning it, the continuing rains left the AoP swamped in the mud. The thinner foliage of winter also left the now sluggishly moving army in full view of the enemy pickets across the river. Beattie and his men received occasional musketry and catcalls, but suffered no losses.

The storm continued delaying the AoP's movements, giving Lee ample time to follow, although making no attempt to interfere beyond sharpshooters, who peppered away on all occasions. The rain continued Thursday and into Friday preventing a crossing. On Friday, Burnside finally became resigned to his fate and gave the order for the army to retire to its quarters. By Saturday, Beattie and the rest of the AoP were back in camp. After the march, Burnside wanted to purge of the Army of the Potomac's leadership, eliminating a number of generals who he felt were responsible for the failures of Fredericksburg and the Mud March. In reality, he had no power to dismiss anyone without the approval of Congress, and he offered his resignation from the AoP. Beattie and his men received a fifth commander when on January 25, Hooker took command. (Note: Beattie also saw his corps commander depart as well.)

Beattie and the men of the AoP soon saw a marked improvement in camp life as Hooker improved/fixed the daily diet of the troops, improved the camp sanitary system, fixed pay problems, fixed the quartermaster system, added and monitored company cooks, made several hospital reforms, improved the furlough system, gave orders to stem rising desertion, improved drills, and introduced stronger officer training. He also reorganized the AoP, discarding Burnside's grand division system He consolidated the cavalry into a separate corps but dispersed his artillery battalions to the control of the infantry division commanders. Beattie and other men in the AoP saw that Hooker cared about them and morale rose.

Beattie and his comrades set about cleaning up the camp laying out regular streets and realigning the tents with these streets. A fellow Vermonter noted that the surrounding countryside had been stripped of all timber growth and fences and that countless houses had been durned to the ground. The men continued drilling and training every day as winter turned to spring. In February, the Vermont Brigade's unpopular commander, Whiting, resigned and was replaced by Lewis A. Grant who like his predecessor had been commander of the 2nd Vermont.

==== Chancellorsville campaign ====
As Beattie and his men prepared for operations in the spring, the AoP had organized a new Bureau of Military Information (BMI) set up by Hooker's new chief of staff, Grig. Gen. Daniel Butterfield. (Note: A New York native and son of the founder of American Express, Butterfield, an 1849 Union College graduate had come into the army from the New York militia. Previously, intelligence gatherers, such as Allan Pinkerton and his detective agency, gathered information only by interrogating prisoners, deserters, "contrabands" (slaves), and refugees. The new BMI added other sources including infantry and cavalry reconnaissance, spies, scouts, signal stations, and an aerial balloon corps run by Thaddeus S. C. Lowe with two hydrogen balloons which regularly ascended to heights of 1,000 feet (300 m) or more to observe Lee's positions. For more information, see Butterfield's and Lowe's Wikipedia articles.) As he received the more complete information correlated from these additional sources, Hooker realized that to avoid the bloodbath of a direct frontal attacks, he could only cross the Rappahannock "by stratagem," and planned on cavalry raid getting between Fredericksburg (Note: He planned to send his 10,000 cavalrymen under Maj. Gen. George Stoneman to cross the Rappahannock far upstream and raid deep into the Confederate rear areas, destroying crucial supply depots along the railroad from the Confederate capital in Richmond to Fredericksburg, which would cut Lee's lines of communication and supply. Hooker thought Lee would react to this threat by withdrawing toward Richmond, and Hooker's infantry would then cross the river and attack the ANV when it was moving and vulnerable.) and Richmond and making a double envelopment of Lee's army. Heavy rains delayed the cavalry raid, so Hooker was forced to create a new plan that had his cavalry and three of his corps crossing the river simultaneously. While the cavalry would make a deep strategic raid, 42,000 men of V, XI, and XII Corps) would stealthily cross the Rappahannock upriver at Kelly's Ford and then proceed south across the Rapidan, concentrate at the Chancellorsville crossroads, and attack Lee's army from the west.

Beattie and his men would be in the second half of the double envelopment and attack the ANV from the east. I and VI Corps would cross the Rappahannock below Fredericksburg and threaten to attack the Confederate right flank. Meanwhile, III Corps and one division of the II Corps would remain visible in their camps at Falmouth to divert Confederate attention from the turning movement. Hooker anticipated that Lee would either retreat or forced to attack on unfavorable terrain.

Hooker's plan worked well, crossing on Thursday, April 30, before being detected and Lee reacted accordingly. (Note: The dates for the battle vary by historian. The National Park Service cites the period from the Union army's establishing a presence on the battlefield (April 30) until its retreat (May 6). McPherson cites May 2 to 6. Livermore, May 1 to 4. McGowen, May 2 to 3. The full Chancellorsville campaign lasted from April 27 to May 7.) He left Early and his division, reinforced with two brigades and artillery, to hold Fredericksburg on Friday while he marched west to deal with Hooker's main thrust at Chancellorsville. Mostly deployed south of Fredericksburg, Early was ordered by Lee to watch the I, III, and VI Corps remaining across the river. If attacked and defeated, he was to retreat southward to protect the supply lines. If the Union force moved to reinforce Hooker, then he was to leave a covering force and rejoin Lee with the remainder of his troops.

Beattie's corps and II Corps seized control of several crossings on April 29, laying down pontoon bridges in the early morning hours, and one division each from I and VI Corps crossed the river. During the evening of May 2, Sedgwick received orders to attack Early with his remaining forces. The men soon found themselves on the same ground they had held in December. Sedgwick moved his forces into Fredericksburg during dawn on May 3, originally planning to attack the ends of Marye's Heights, but instead sent VI Corps against the Confederate center on the heights, commanded by Brig. Gen. William Barksdale. (Note: A Tennessean and veteran of the war with Mexico, Braksdale was a former member of Congress. His brigaed from Maj. Gen. McLaw's division in the Rebel I Corps (temporarily commanded by Lee himself while Longstreet was operating independently down at Suffolk, Virginia) had been detached sent to Early as reinforcement.) Beattie and his men were marched north to the town and held in reserve in the third division in the column of attack. Although repulsed, the Federals noticed the Rebel right flank looked unprotected. Sedgwick received word from his subordinates about the weak Rebel right of the line on the heights with a gap between it and Early south of the town, and he planned accordingly. Beattie and his men, like all the men in the impending attack were ordered to drop their packs and to refrain from firing until they reached the crest. Sedgwick launched this attack against the Rebel right simultaneous with an assault on the dreaded stonewall along the sunken road in the Confederate center using troops from all three VI Corps divisions. The 3rd Vermont was on the left of the attack and advanced up the Lee's Hill at the southern end of the Rebel line. The men in VI Corps moved at the double-quick as the enemy poured musketry and artillery into them, tearing gaps in the formations. Beattie and his brigade swept up the hill just as other units breached the line at the stone wall that had not been reached in December. These assaults were too much for the defenders who were pushed the Confederate forces off the ridge. Barksdale retreated to Lee's Hill, where he attempted to make another stand but was again forced to retreat southward.

Early, occupying a line on the hills overlooking the railroad south of town, suddenly found himself outflanked by overwhelming numbers to his north and withdrew. Soon, he launched counterattacks up from the wooded ravines west of the heights. Beattie and the 3rd joined its brigade mates in stopping the attacks with well-timed and well-placed musketry. Sedgwick's path to Hooker and the AoP was open, but in the delay caused by gathering forming his troops in a marching column, the opportunity passed. The 3rd was at the rear of the column that was delayed for several hours by Brig. Gen. Wilcox's Alabama brigade. At their final delaying line at Salem church, three brigades from McLaws's division and one from Anderson's joined them and stopped Sedgwick's advance. Beattie's men retreated with the rest of the force to more defendable ridges without contact.

On Friday, May 4, Beattie and his men were on the left flank facing east in Howe's division whose left was anchored on the Rappahanock. (Note: Sedgwick had placed his 20,000 men in a U-shaped formation tied on the west by Banks' Ford and on the east by Taylor's Hill. Lee deployed around them with McLaws to the west, Anderson to the south, and Early to the east. Getting these divisions in position took most of the day, and not until 5:00 p.m. did Early launch two of his brigades, Hoke's and Hays', against Sedgwick's left where Beattie was.) At 7:00 a.m. on May 4, Early recaptured Marye's Heights then turned west until he arrived at Sedgwick's main lines, halting after coming under heavy fire. During the remainder of the morning, Early launched a series of uncoordinated attacks on the Howe's position, all of which were defeated. Sedgwick was now outnumbered hold a six mile long line held by 20,000 troops against now 25,000 Confederates with only one bridgehead as an out if pressed. He asked that the main army assist him, but Hooker told him to stay put and not to attack unless the main army did the same. Meanwhile, Lee (Note: Lee, despite being outnumbered by a ratio of over two to one, won arguably his greatest victory of the war, sometimes described as his "perfect battle.") arrived on scene and launched additional new attacks. Beattie and his men just as at Marye's heights galled Early's attacks. Nightfall was mitigated by a bright full moon. Early, thinking the left held by the Vermont brigade would fail, launched a night attack. The 3rd and its brigade opened with musketry and artillery when the Rebels were in the open and defeated them. The engineers had added a second bridge during the day and Sedgwick opted to escape at night across the bridges. VI Corps began retreating to a pre-planned smaller line closer to the bridges, and began their retreat without losses.

After crossing the river, Sedgwick's men moved down the east bank and crossed again into Fredericksburg which they occupied. Beattie's brigade covered the withdrawal and were among the last to cross the Rappahannock with a loss of two killed and mortally wounded, 24 wounded, and 13 missing over the three days. (Note: While victorious, Lee suffered more casualties than he had lost in any previous battle, including Antietam. With only 60,000 men engaged, he suffered 13,303 casualties (1,665 killed, 9,081 wounded, 2,018 missing), losing some 22% of his force in the campaign—men that the Confederacy, with its limited manpower, could not replace. Just as seriously, he lost his most aggressive field commander, Stonewall Jackson. Brig. Gen. Elisha F. Paxton was the other Confederate general killed during the battle. After Longstreet rejoined the main army, he was highly critical of Lee's strategy, saying that battles like Chancellorsville cost the Confederacy more men than it could afford to lose.)

==== Gettysburg Campaign ====
While Beattie and his company garrisoned Fredericksburg after the battle, they and the rest of the AoP saw an increase in the number of slaves that emancipated themselves by slipping into their lines. On Thursday, May 7, Beattie saw Stoneman's cavalry return to the army encampments. The AoP once again began resupplying, training, drilling, and manning pickets to keep an eye on the ANV. Unbeknownst to Beattie and his comrades, Lee decided upon a second invasion of the North to upset Union plans for the summer, to maneuver his army away from its defensive positions behind the Rappahannock, to deal a blow to Union morale, and to forage resources from northern farms while giving war-ravaged Virginia a much needed break. He could also threaten Philadelphia, Baltimore, and Washington, D.C., and encourage the growing peace movement in the North. Seriously short of supplies for his own army, he planned the campaign primarily as a full-scale raid that would seize supplies.

==== New York City ====
From the middle of August until the mi9dle of September, Beattie and his regiment were on duty in New York City maintaining law and order after the Draft Riots. T Among other duties, Beattie and his men were sent across the Hudson to Newark, on Saturday, September 5, to mount guard over a New Jersey regiment, which had been recruited by means of large bounties which led to a large number of bounty jumpers in its ranks; the desertion of these men put the entire regiment in danger of dissolution. A guard of regulars had initially assigned the duty, but had little success, In response, Brig. Gen. Dix relieved them with the 3rd. On Monday night, September 7, a number of the bounty jumpers tried to rush past the guard, who, after warning them opened fire. Beattie's regiment killed three and wounded four. There were no more attempts during Beattie's duty there. He and his regimental comrades noticed a hatred among this regiment and had to be alert for their own safety.

==== Return to the AoP ====
On Sunday, September 13, Beattie and his regiment entrained and returned to the AoP. After getting off at Washington, they marched through Alexandria and arrived at Fairfax Court House Thursday, September 17. The following Tuesday, Beattie, and his men moved to Culpeper Courthouse where the remained until the Bristoe Campaign began on Friday, October 9. Beattie and his men saw little action in that campaign and little in the Mine Run Campaign, roughly six weeks later, from November 26 until December 2. During the AoP's withdrawal from the front of Mine Run, on Tuesday, December 1, and the following day, the 3rd with the 77th New York and a battery guarded the Germania Ford and covered the rear, while the army marched back to its old camp, near Brandy Station. Thursday, December 3, Beattie and his men followed the rest of the army and went into winter quarters near Brandy Station where it remained for five months.

In December, 204 of the men re-enlisted for the war, but Beattie was not among them. Successive additions of recruits brought up the aggregate of the regiment on the 1st of February to 800. The health of the regiment at this time was remarkable, the sick list averaging but 83, for four months.

=== 1864 ===
==== The Overland Campaign ====
Beattie's depleted brigade also received reinforcements in May 1864 when the 11th Vermont was assigned to it. That same month, the AoP, still commanded by Meade but under the overall supervision of Lt. Gen. Ulysses S. Grant, began its spring offensive (the Overland Campaign) towards Richmond. Beattie's brigade mustered approximately 2,850 soldiers at the start of the campaign. Beattie while still commanding his company was chosen to command the brigade's skirmishers on an ad hoc basis.

On the morning of May 5, the Union army attacked Gen. Robert E. Lee's Army of Northern Virginia at the Battle of the Wilderness. While the initial Union attack was successful, rough terrain and stubborn resistance ground down the attack. By midday, Lt. Gen. A.P. Hill's Confederate corps had been brought up and was attacking the weak Union center along the Orange Plank Road. Maj. Gen. George W. Getty's brigades were ordered by Maj. Gen. Winfield S. Hancock, who was still bringing up most of his corps, to hold the road and counterattack. The Vermont Brigade took the southern flank and charged the advancing Confederates. Ordered to retreat, the 5th Vermont regiment instead launched a bayonet charge, buying time for Union troops and the rest of the Vermont Brigade to fall back to their hasty works. The Confederates continued to attack until the Union line was stabilized. Losses by the brigade totaled 1,269 killed, wounded, and missing in less than 12 hours of fighting.

After the Wilderness, the Union Army moved south to Spotsylvania Court House, where Lee's army had entrenched. The 11th Vermont Infantry joined the brigade at this point. Early in the battle, elements of the Vermont brigade, defending barricades forward of the rest of the Union Army, were ordered to retreat and spike their supporting artillery field pieces before the Confederates overran them. Disobeying orders, the commander of the brigade ordered the guns to be "spiked with canister," and the brigade was able to defend the guns and works successfully until reinforcements arrived to stabilize the position. Beattie's brigade suffered heavily during the ensuing assault on the Confederate defenses as it led the assault on the "Mule Shoe Salient", a protruding network of trenches in the center of the Confederate lines.

The final battle of the Overland Campaign was the Battle of Cold Harbor. The Vermont Brigade was one of the units selected to charge Confederate earthworks on June 1, 1864. Grant's attack failed and he suffered heavy losses. During this action, Beattie was in command of the skirmishers and performed the deed which earned him the Medal of Honor. In less than 10 minutes, hundreds of soldiers from the Vermont Brigade were killed or wounded. The brigade, in less than one month of fighting, had been reduced from 2,850 men to less than 1,200.

==== Petersburg, Fort Stevens, and discharge ====
While the Army of the Potomac and the Army of Northern Virginia dug in at Petersburg, Confederate Lt. Gen. Jubal A. Early was sent on a mission through the Shenandoah Valley to the outskirts of Washington, D.C. Beattie and his brigade were pulled out of the trenches and sent to the defenses of Washington where they threw back Early in his attack on Fort Stevens.

After Fort Stevens, Beattie and the other men who had not re-enlisted, bade their comrades farewell, and returned to Montpelier. Beattie mustered out as a Captain on Wednesday, July 27, 1864. He had served three years and forty-eight days on active duty.

== Medal of Honor citation ==
Rank and organization: Captain, Company F, 3rd Vermont Infantry. Place and date: At Cold Harbor, Virginia, June 5, 1864. Entered service at: Guildhall, Vermont. Born: July 29, 1828, Ryegate, Vermont. Date of issue: April 25, 1894.

Citation:

The President of the United States of America, in the name of Congress, takes pleasure in presenting the Medal of Honor to Captain Alexander Mitchell Beatty, United States Army, for extraordinary heroism on 5 June 1864, while serving with Company F, 3d Vermont Infantry, in action at Cold Harbor, Virginia. Captain Beatty removed, under a hot fire, a wounded member of his command to a place of safety.

== Postwar ==
After mustering out, Beattie returned to Ryegate. His mother had died while he was taking part in the Siege of Yorktown. He worked for his father's business until his father died in 1866 and he moved northeast to Brunswick, VT to start his own lumbering business. A Democrat, he was Brunswick's state representative from 1867 to 1868 in the Vermont House of Representatives, the lower house of the Vermont General Assembly. In 1869, he moved his business down the Connecticut River to Lancaster, NH, where his brothers, David had expanded successfully. In Lancaster that year, at age 41, he married Connecticut-born 22-year-old, Celestia Congdon, who had moved with her family to town between 1850 and 1852.

On February 26, 1871, they had a daughter, Mabel Alexander. He became successful and expanded his business into Pittsburgh, NH and Granby VT. In the 1880 census, he was living in Lancaster on Bellows Farm in Lancaster with his wife, daughter, and a farmhand. He continued to be active in the community. He was also involved in veterans organizations and was elected a companion of the Vermont Commandery of the Military Order of the Loyal Legion of the United States on May 10, 1892, at its annual meeting in Burlington, VT. On May 31, 1892, his 22-year-old daughter Mabel married 35-year-old widower, Dr. Charles D. Sawin, M.D. of Somerville, MA, in Lancaster. The year of his daughter's wedding, Lancaster's citizens elected him to the New Hampshire House of Representatives where he served from 1893 to 1894.

While in office, he was notified that he had earned the Medal of Honor for his actions at the Battle of Cold Harbor on July 5, 1864. On April 25, 1894, he was awarded it. By the 1900 census, Captain Beattie was at 71, still working and living at Bellows Farm with his wife, two employees, and a servant. After living in Lancaster for 37 years, Beattie died of old age at 78 on March 7, 1897, survived by his wife, daughter, and son-in-law.

== See also ==
- List of American Civil War Medal of Honor recipients: A–F
- 3rd Vermont Infantry Regiment
- Vermont in the Civil War
