= John Taylor of Caroline =

American politician and writer (1753–1824)

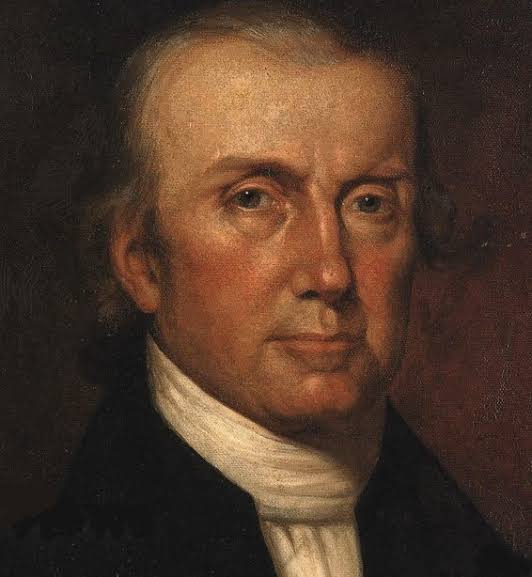

United States Senator from Virginia
- In office December 18, 1822 – August 21, 1824
- Preceded by: James Pleasants
- Succeeded by: Littleton W. Tazewell
- In office June 4, 1803 – December 7, 1803
- Appointed by: John Page
- Preceded by: Stevens T. Mason
- Succeeded by: Abraham B. Venable
- In office October 18, 1792 – May 11, 1794
- Preceded by: Richard H. Lee
- Succeeded by: Henry Tazewell

Member of the Virginia House of Delegates from Caroline County
- In office 1796–1800
- In office 1783–1785
- In office 1779–1782

Personal details
- Born: December 19, 1753 Caroline County, Colony of Virginia
- Died: August 21, 1824 (aged 70) Hazelwood
- Party: Democratic-Republican
- Education: College of William & Mary
- Profession: Lawyer, planter

John Taylor (December 19, 1753 – August 21, 1824), usually called John Taylor of Caroline (a reference to his home county), was an American politician and writer. He served in the Virginia House of Delegates (1779–1781, 1783–1785, 1796–1800) and in the United States Senate (1792–1794, 1803, 1822–1824). He wrote several books on politics and agriculture. He was a Jeffersonian Republican and his works provided inspiration to the later states' rights and libertarian movements. Sheldon and Hill (2008) locate Taylor at the intersection of republicanism and classical liberalism. They see his position as a "combination of a concern with Lockean natural rights, freedom, and limited government along with a classical interest in strong citizen participation in rule to prevent concentrated power and wealth, political corruption, and financial manipulation."

== Early life ==
According to some sources, John Taylor was born in Orange County, Virginia, in 1753, though others state that this is in error and that he was in fact born in Caroline County in 1754. He was the son of James Taylor and Ann Pollard. She was a sister of Sarah Pollard, wife of Edmund Pendleton, a Founding Father of the State of Virginia who served as president of the Fifth Virginia Convention held between May and July 1776, that declared in favor of independence. Taylor was of the same line as General Zachary Taylor, who became the President of the United States. He graduated from the College of William & Mary in 1770, studied law, and began to practice in Caroline County in 1774. At the onset of the Revolutionary War he joined the Continental army, becoming a colonel of cavalry.

== Political career ==
Taylor served in the Virginia House of Delegates from 1779 to 1787, being one of the leading members. About this time he gave up the practice of law and devoted his ample time to politics and agriculture. In 1792 he was appointed to fill the unexpired term of Richard Henry Lee in the United States Senate, and was elected to the term that began March 4, 1793, but resigned, May 11, 1794. He served as a presidential elector in 1797. Taylor was a close friend of Thomas Jefferson, and, as member of the House of Delegates, was one of the men who offered the Virginia Resolves to that body. In 1801, Taylor ran for Congress in Virginia's 11th congressional district, but lost to incumbent Anthony New.

Taylor served in the U.S. Senate on two additional occasions. He was appointed to the Senate to fill the vacancy caused by the death of Stevens Thomson Mason, and served from June 4, 1803, until December 7, 1803, when he resigned. In 1822, he was elected to fill the vacancy occasioned by the resignation of James Pleasants, and was elected later to serve the regular term for six years beginning December 18, 1822, but died at his estate in Caroline County, August 20, 1824.

Taylor was a prolific political writer, and was the author of "An Inquiry into the Principles and Policy of the Government of the United States," 1814; "Construction Construed and the Constitution Vindicated." 1820; "Tyranny Unmasked. 1822; "New Views of the Constitution of the United States." 1823. He was also a scientific agriculturist, and in 1811 was first president of the Virginia Agricultural Societies. His little books, "Arator" ("Ploughman", in Latin), being a series of agricultural essays, practical and political, 1818, was one of the first American books on agriculture. Taylor County, West Virginia, was named in his honor.

== Ideas ==
English legal historian Maurice Vile views Taylor as "in some ways the most impressive political theorist that America has produced." The historian Clyde N. Wilson describes Taylor as "the systematic philosopher of Jeffersonian democracy" and as "representing 'both a conservative allegiance to local community and inherited ways and a radical-populist suspicion of capitalism, 'progress,' government and routine logrolling politics.'" According to historian Adam L. Tate, Taylor was "an agrarian who 'viewed happiness as possession of family, farm, and leisure,' had no great love for organized religion, social hierarchy, and other such traditional institutions." Joseph R. Stromberg wrote, "Taylor took solid liberal ground in holding that men were a mixture of good and evil. Self-interest was the only real constant in human action.... Indeed, while other thinkers, from Thomas Jefferson to Federalist John Adams, agonized over the need for a virtuous citizenry, Taylor took the view that 'the principles of a society may be virtuous, though the individuals composing it are vicious.'" Taylor's solution to the effects of factionalism was to "remove the base from under the stock jobbers, the banks, the paper money party, the tariff-supported manufacturers, and so on; destroy the system of patronage by which the executive has corrupted the legislature; bring down the usurped authority of the Supreme Court." "The more a nation depends for its liberty on the qualities of individuals, the less likely it is to retain it. By expecting publick good from private virtue, we expose ourselves to publick evils from private vices."

=== Slavery ===
Taylor wrote in defense of slavery but admitted that it was wrong. "Let it not be supposed that I approve of slavery because I do not aggravate its evils, or prefer a policy which must terminate in a war of extermination." Rather, he defended the institution because he "thought blacks incapable of liberty." Taylor feared that widespread emancipation would ultimately and invariably lead to the horrific bloodshed witnessed in the French colony of Saint-Domingue in 1791, the site of the greatest of all successful slave insurrections, the Haitian Revolution. "Taylor is one with most American thinkers from Washington to Jefferson to Lincoln in doubting that the free Negro could ever be anything but a problem for American politics." Thus, he advocated the deportation of free blacks.

"Negro slavery is a misfortune to agriculture, incapable of removal, and only within the reach of palliation." Taylor criticized Jefferson's ambivalence towards slavery in Notes on the State of Virginia. Taylor agreed with Jefferson that the institution was evil but took issue with Jefferson's repeated references to the specific cruelties of slavery. Taylor argued that "[s]laves are docile, useful and happy, if they are well managed," that "[t]he individual is restrained by his property in the slave, and susceptible of humanity, and that "[r]eligion assails him [the slaveholder] both with her blandishments and terrors. It indissolubly binds his, and his slaves' happiness or misery together."

That slavery might paradoxically have fostered a sense of equality among whites has been reconsidered recently by Edmund S. Morgan. Taylor's approach, defending the preservation of slavery under the circumstances and apprehensions of his day, would be used to support more emphatic defenses of slavery by writers, such as John C. Calhoun, Edmund Ruffin, and George Fitzhugh, who extended the argument by claiming the institution to be a "positive good."

=== States' rights ===
Stromberg says that Taylor's role in calling for Virginia's secession in 1798 and his role in the Kentucky and Virginia Resolutions "show how seriously he took the reserved rights [interposition (nullification) and secession] of these primary political communities [the States]." Taylor was responsible for guiding the Virginia Resolution, written by James Madison, through the Virginia legislature. He wrote: "enormous political power invariably accumulates enormous wealth and enormous wealth invariably accumulates enormous political power." "Like his radical bourgeois counterparts in England, Taylor would not concede that great extremes of wealth and poverty were natural outcomes of differences in talent; on the contrary they were invariably the result of extra-economic coercion and deceit." "Along with John Randolph of Roanoke and a few others, Taylor opposed Madison's War of 1812—his own party's war—precisely because it was a war for empire."

Tate (2011) undertakes a literary criticism of Taylor's book New Views of the Constitution of the United States, arguing it is structured as a forensic historiography modeled on the techniques of 18th-century whig lawyers. Taylor believed that evidence from American history gave proof of state sovereignty within the union, against the arguments of nationalists such as Chief Justice John Marshall.

== Legacy ==
Taylor's primary plantation estate, Hazelwood, was located three miles from Port Royal, Virginia and is on the National Register of Historic Places.

Taylor County, West Virginia was formed in 1844 and named in Senator Taylor's honor.

== Writings ==
- An Enquiry into the Principles and Tendency of Certain Public Measures (Philadelphia: Thomas Dobson, 1794).
- A Definition of Parties: Or the Political Effects of the Paper System Considered (Philadelphia: Francis Bailey, 1794).
- Arator (first published as a book in 1813 (without attribution) from a collection of sixty-four essays, originally published in a Georgetown newspaper in 1810–1811, which pertain to American agriculture, including some of Taylor's views on slavery).
- A Pamphlet Containing a Series of Letters (Richmond: E. C. Stanard, 1809).
- An Inquiry into the Principles and Policy of the Government of the United States (1814) – a detailed and elaborate critique of the political-philosophical system developed and defended by John Adams in his Defence of the Constitutions of Government of the United States of America (1787).
- Construction Construed and Constitutions Vindicated (Richmond: Shepherd and Pollard, 1820).
- Tyranny Unmasked (Washington: Davis and Force, 1822).
- New Views of the Constitution of the United States (Washington: Way and Gideon, 1823).

The last three books listed "are to be valued chiefly for their insight into federal-state relations and the true nature of the Union." M. E. Bradford, ed., Arator 35 (Indianapolis: Liberty Fund 1977).

The above publication notations are credited to F. Thornton Miller, ed., Tyranny Unmasked, Foreword ix-xxii (Indianapolis: Liberty Fund 1992).

From Reprints of Legal Classics (1)

Little-known today, Taylor's work is of great significance in the political and intellectual history of the South and is essential for understanding the constitutional theories that Southerners asserted to justify secession in 1861. Taylor fought in the Continental army during the American Revolution and served briefly in the Virginia House of Delegates and as a U.S. Senator. It was as a writer on constitutional, political, and agricultural questions, however, that Taylor gained prominence. He joined with Thomas Jefferson and other agrarian advocates of states' rights and a strict construction of the Constitution in the political battles of the 1790s. His first published writings argued against Secretary of the Treasury Alexander Hamilton's financial program. Construction Construed and Constitutions Vindicated was Taylor's response to a series of post-War of 1812 developments including John Marshall's Supreme Court decision in McCulloch v. Maryland, the widespread issuance of paper money by banks, proposals for a protective tariff, and the attempt to bar slavery from Missouri. Along with many other Southerners, Taylor feared that these and other measures following in the train of Hamilton's financial system, were undermining the foundations of American republicanism. He saw them as the attempt of an "artificial capitalist sect" to corrupt the virtue of the American people and upset the proper constitutional balance between state and federal authority in favor of a centralized national government. Taylor wrote, "If the means to which the government of the union may resort for executing the power confided to it, are unlimited, it may easily select such as will impair or destroy the powers confided to the state governments." Jefferson, who noted that "Col. Taylor and myself have rarely, if ever, differed in any political principle of importance," considered Construction Construed and Constitutions Vindicated "the most logical retraction of our governments to the original and true principles of the Constitution creating them, which has appeared since the adoption of the instrument." Later Southern thinkers, notably John C. Calhoun, were clearly indebted to Taylor. Sabin, A Dictionary of Books Relating to America 94486. Cohen, Bibliography of Early American Law 6333. (21527)

== See also ==
- List of members of the United States Congress who died in office (1790–1899)

== Suggested reading ==
- Mudge, Eugene T. The Social Philosophy of John Taylor of Caroline (New York: Columbia University Press 1939).
- Shallhope, Robert E. John Taylor of Caroline: Pastoral Republican (Columbia: University of South Carolina Press, 1980).
- Wright, Benjamin F. "The Philosopher of Jeffersonian Democracy," American Political Science Review Vol. 22, No. 4 (Nov., 1928), pp. 870–892 in JSTOR

U.S. Senate
Preceded by Richard H. Lee	U.S. senator (Class 2) from Virginia; October 18, 1792 – May 11, 1794; Served alongside: James Monroe	Succeeded by Henry Tazewell
Preceded by Stevens T. Mason	U.S. senator (Class 1) from Virginia; June 4, 1803 – December 7, 1803; Served alongside: Wilson C. Nicholas	Succeeded by Abraham B. Venable
Preceded by James Pleasants	U.S. senator (Class 2) from Virginia; December 18, 1822 – August 21, 1824; Served alongside: James Barbour	Succeeded by Littleton W. Tazewell
