= Nancy Wrights Corner, Virginia =

Unincorporated community in Virginia, United States

Coordinates: 38°05′25″N 77°30′45″W

Nancy Wrights Corner is an unincorporated community in Caroline County, in the U.S. state of Virginia. It is located along US 1 and VSR 605, west of Woodford. The community was one of the sites of the Battle of North Anna.
