= Camden (Port Royal, Virginia) =

Historic house in Virginia, United States

- U.S. National Register of Historic Places
- U.S. National Historic Landmark
- Virginia Landmarks Register
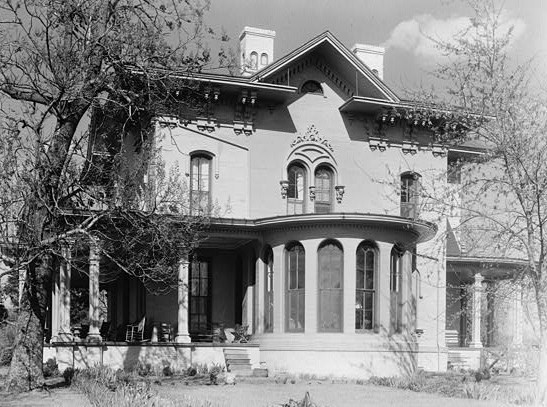

- Location within Virginia Location within the United States
- Nearest city: Port Royal, Virginia
- Coordinates: 38°09′47.62″N 77°09′41.02″W
- Built: 1857
- Architect: Norris G. Starkweather
- Architectural style: Italian Villa
- NRHP reference No.: 69000228
- VLR No.: 016-0004

Significant dates
- Added to NRHP: November 12, 1969
- Designated NHL: November 11, 1971
- Designated VLR: September 9, 1969, July 15, 1986

Camden is an Italian villa-style house on the Rappahannock River just downriver of Port Royal, Virginia. Built 1857–1859, it is one of the nation's finest examples of an Italianate country house. It is located on the southeast bank of the Rappahannock River, about 0.5 miles (0.80 km) north of the intersection of Camden Road (Virginia State Route 686) and United States Route 17. Camden was declared a National Historic Landmark in 1971 for its architecture.

== Description and history ==
Camden is a two-story frame house in a pure Italianate style, clad with flush siding that was originally treated to resemble stone. The tower base projects from the front, with a semicircular porch surrounding its base, looking out over the Rappahannock River. The first floor includes a central hall, library, dining room, parlor and a main-level bedroom. The parlor retains its original Victorian rococo furnishings.

Camden was built on the basement of an earlier house belonging to the Pratt family that dated to 1760. William Carter Pratt demolished this house around 1856 to use the prominent site for a new house. He engaged Baltimore architect Norris G. Starkweather, with construction stating in 1857, completed in 1859. Up-to-date in style and technology, the house was equipped with central heating and cooling, gas lights and running water. A private gas works was installed to generate gas for the lights. The house's tower was destroyed during the American Civil War, by a hit from a Union gunboat in late November 1862, and never restored.

The property is also significant as the home of a Native American family of the late 17th century, where iron trade tools and silver medals have been found. The silver medals were minted by the British and given to the Powhatan chiefs as tokens of peace. The Silver medals were discovered on the property during the excavation of an older structure, eventually discovered to be the house of John "The Ranger" Taliaferro.

== See also ==
- List of National Historic Landmarks in Virginia
- National Register of Historic Places listings in Caroline County, Virginia
