= Port Royal Historic District =

Historic district in Virginia, United States

- U.S. National Register of Historic Places
- U.S. Historic district
- Virginia Landmarks Register
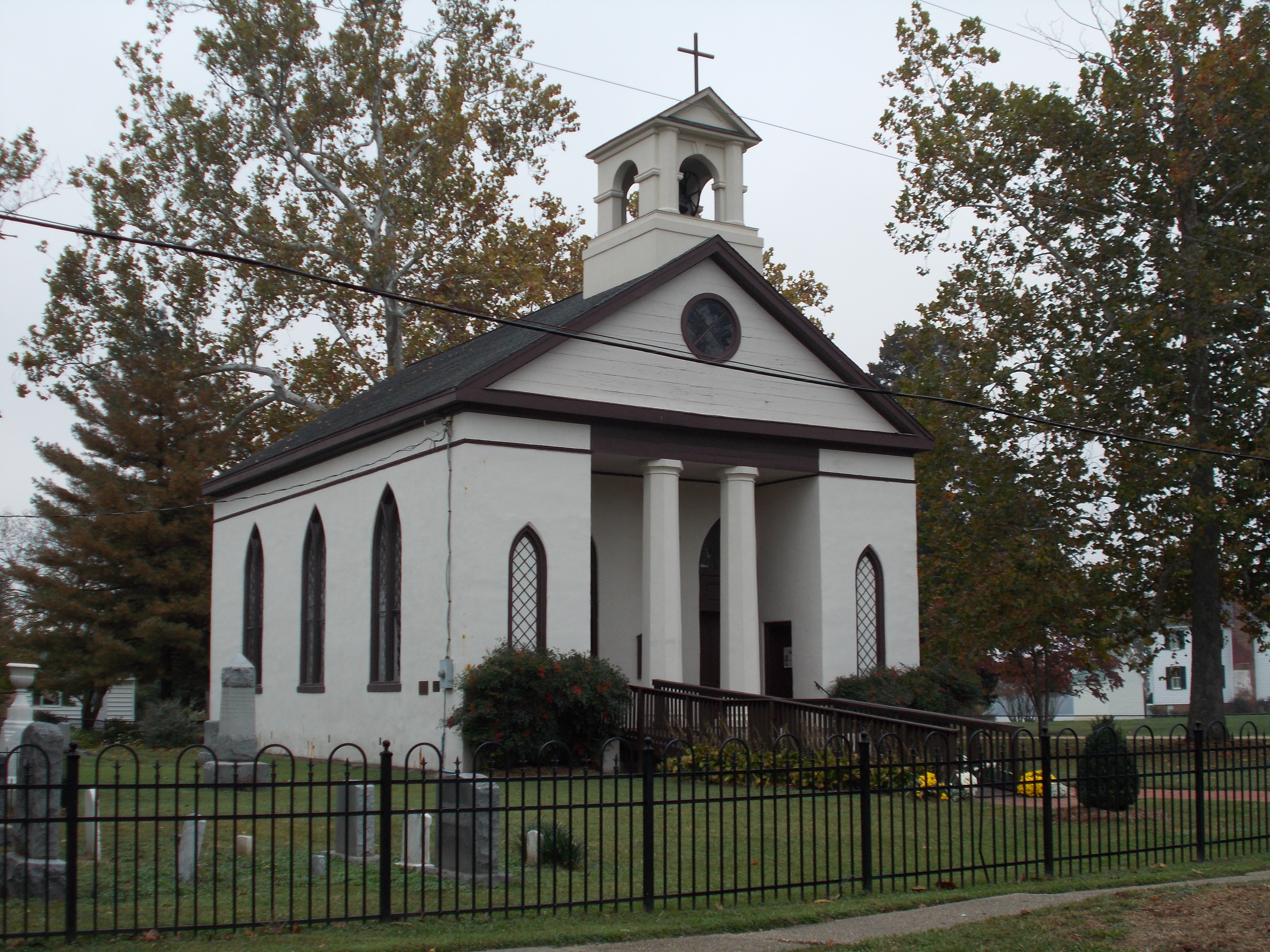
- St. Peter's Episcopal Church, Port Royal Historic District, October 2012

- Location within Virginia Location within the United States
- Location: Roughly bounded by Rappahannock River, Roys Run, Rt. 17, and Goldenville Creek, Port Royal, Virginia
- Coordinates: 38°03′03″N 77°21′00″W
- Area: 200 acres (81 ha)
- Built: 1745
- Architectural style: Federal
- NRHP reference No.: 70000786
- VLR No.: 284-0047

Significant dates
- Added to NRHP: February 16, 1970
- Designated VLR: December 2, 1969

Port Royal Historic District is a national historic district located at Port Royal, Caroline County, Virginia. The district encompasses 35 contributing buildings in the historic core of the 18th century tobacco port of Port Royal. Notable buildings include the 18th-century Fox's Tavern, the mid-19th century Masonic Hall, the 18th-century frame mansion of the Brockenbrough family, the Hipkins-Carr House, the Gray House, and St. Peter's Episcopal Church (c. 1836). Townfield and Riverview are separately listed.

It was listed on the National Register of Historic Places in 1970.
