= Meadow Event Park =

Event venue in Doswell, Virginia, United States

Coordinates: 37.850°N 77.421°W

Location in the United States
Location in Virginia

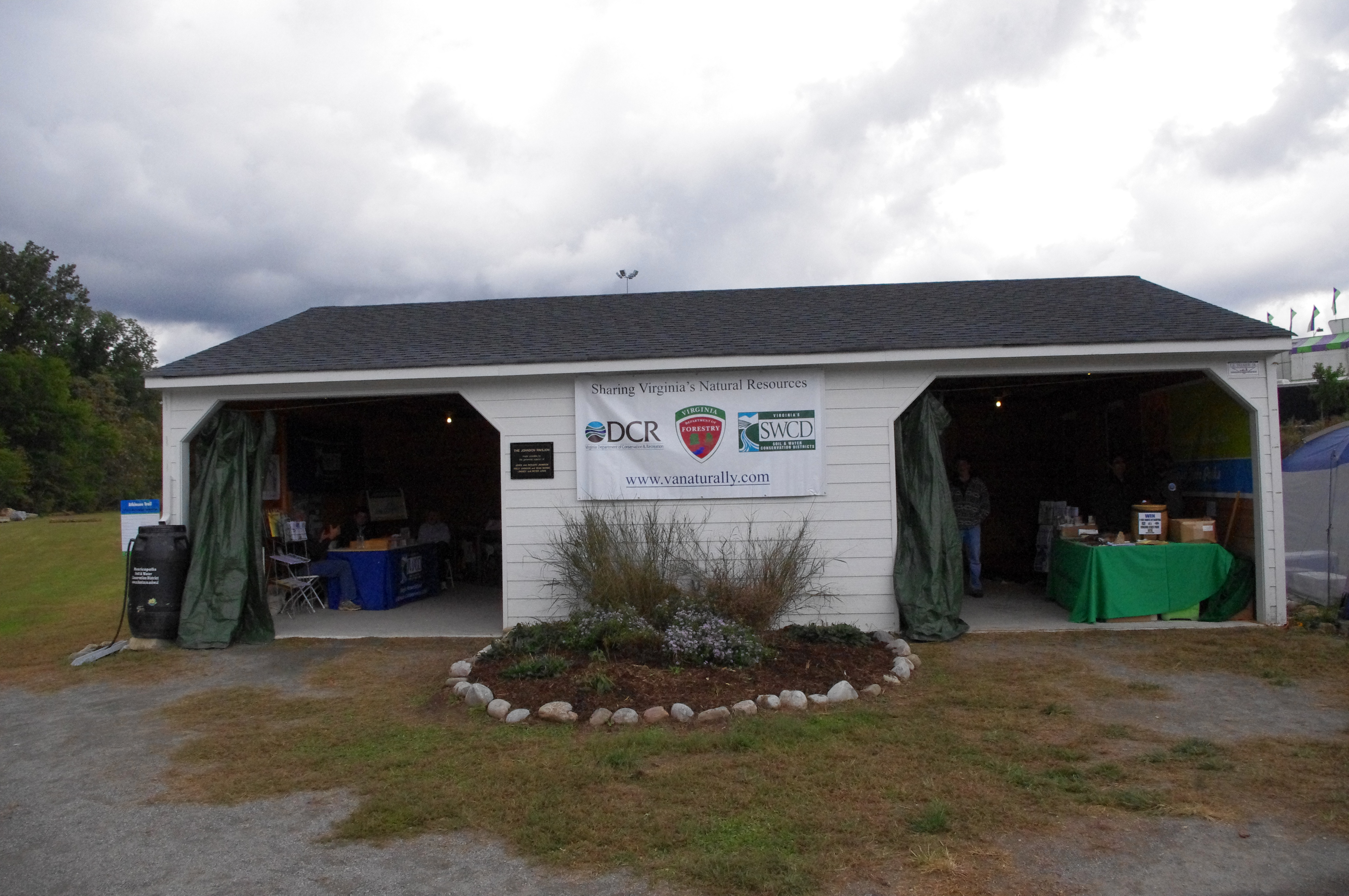
A display shed at the park

The Meadow Event Park (also called "The Meadow") is an event center in Doswell, Virginia. Previously called the Meadow Stables, the park hosts the annual State Fair of Virginia. On March 14, 2013, the Virginia Farm Bureau Federation bought the State Fair of Virginia and the Meadow Event Park from Universal Fairs LLC of Cordova, Tennessee. The Meadow Event Park also hosts other events. The historic structures of the Thoroughbred farm remain on the 331-acre (1.34 km^{2}) site. The park was the birthplace of famous Thoroughbred racing horse Secretariat, the 1973 Triple Crown champion.

The original barns that housed Secretariat, Riva Ridge, and earlier Meadow Stable champions have been preserved including the foaling shed where Secretariat was born on March 30, 1970. Meadow Hall showcases the Meadow Champions Galleries, the Triple Crown Room and the Museum of the Virginia Horse. In the fall, the State Fair features a Salute to Secretariat.

The history of The Meadow dates back to 1805, when Dr. Charles D. Morris purchased 4,000 acres (16 km^{2}) of land which served as his family's home for the next 100 years. The farm was sold out of the family in the early 1900s until Christopher Chenery, a Morris descendant, bought it back in 1936.

His daughter, Penny Chenery, continued his work, achieving success with Riva Ridge and Secretariat. In 1972, Riva Ridge won the Kentucky Derby and the Belmont Stakes and placed fourth in the Preakness. In 1973, Secretariat became the first horse in twenty-five years to win the Triple Crown and the only champion to break all three track records, which still stand fifty years later.

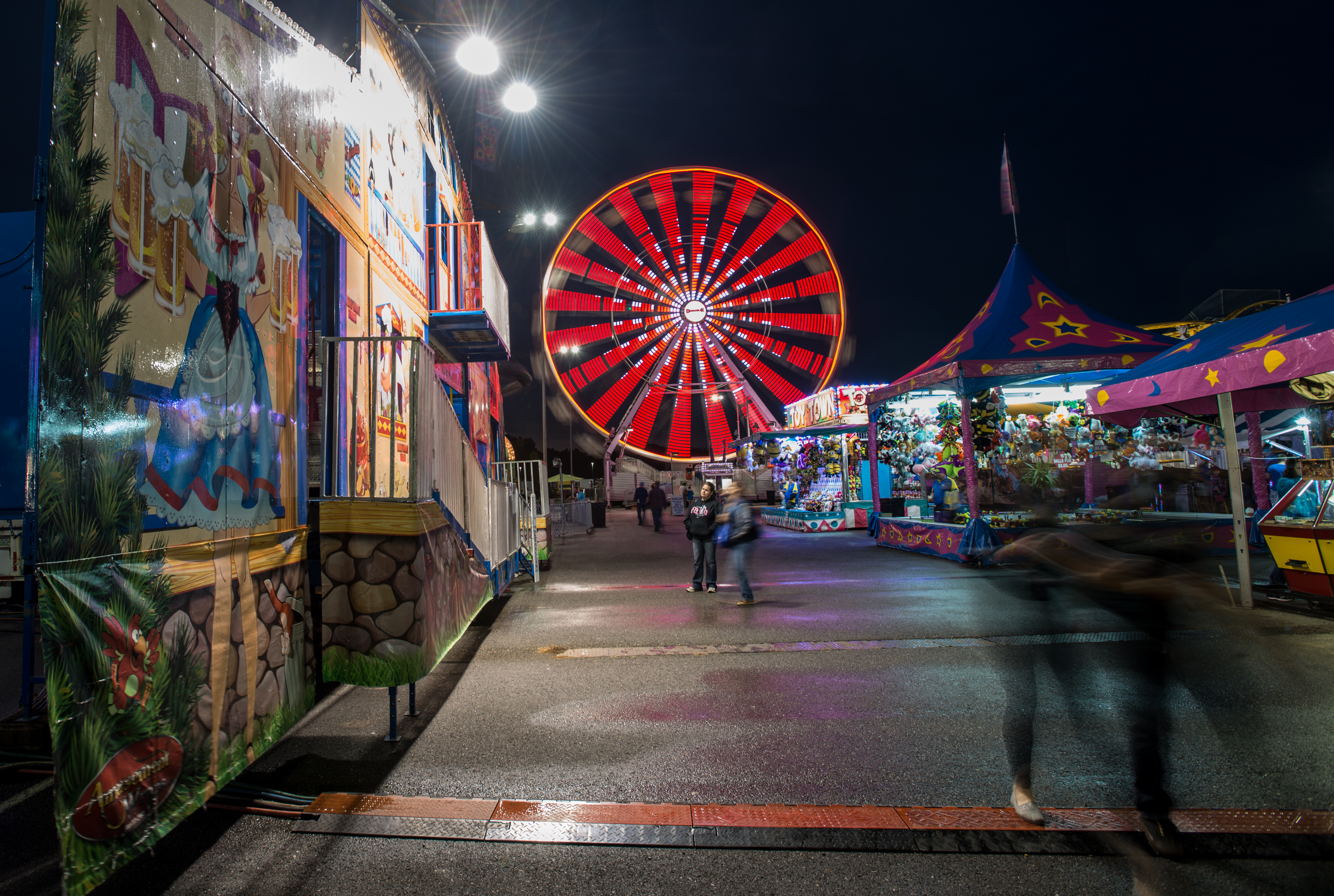
2014 State Fair hosted at Meadow Event Park

The Meadow was sold by the Chenery family in 1979, and most of the property was divided into smaller parcels. The rest of the farm changed owners several times. The venue has been owned by the Virginia Farm Bureau Federation since March 14, 2013. It was listed on the National Register of Historic Places as The Meadow Historic District in 2015. The Meadow's history includes the African American grooms that are mentioned in the National Park Service application. Meadow Farms and Secretariat are also recognized by an official roadside historic marker from the State of Virginia.

== See also ==
- National Register of Historic Places listings in Caroline County, Virginia
