= Riverview (Port Royal, Virginia) =

Historic house in Virginia, United States

- U.S. National Register of Historic Places
- U.S. Historic district – Contributing property
- Virginia Landmarks Register
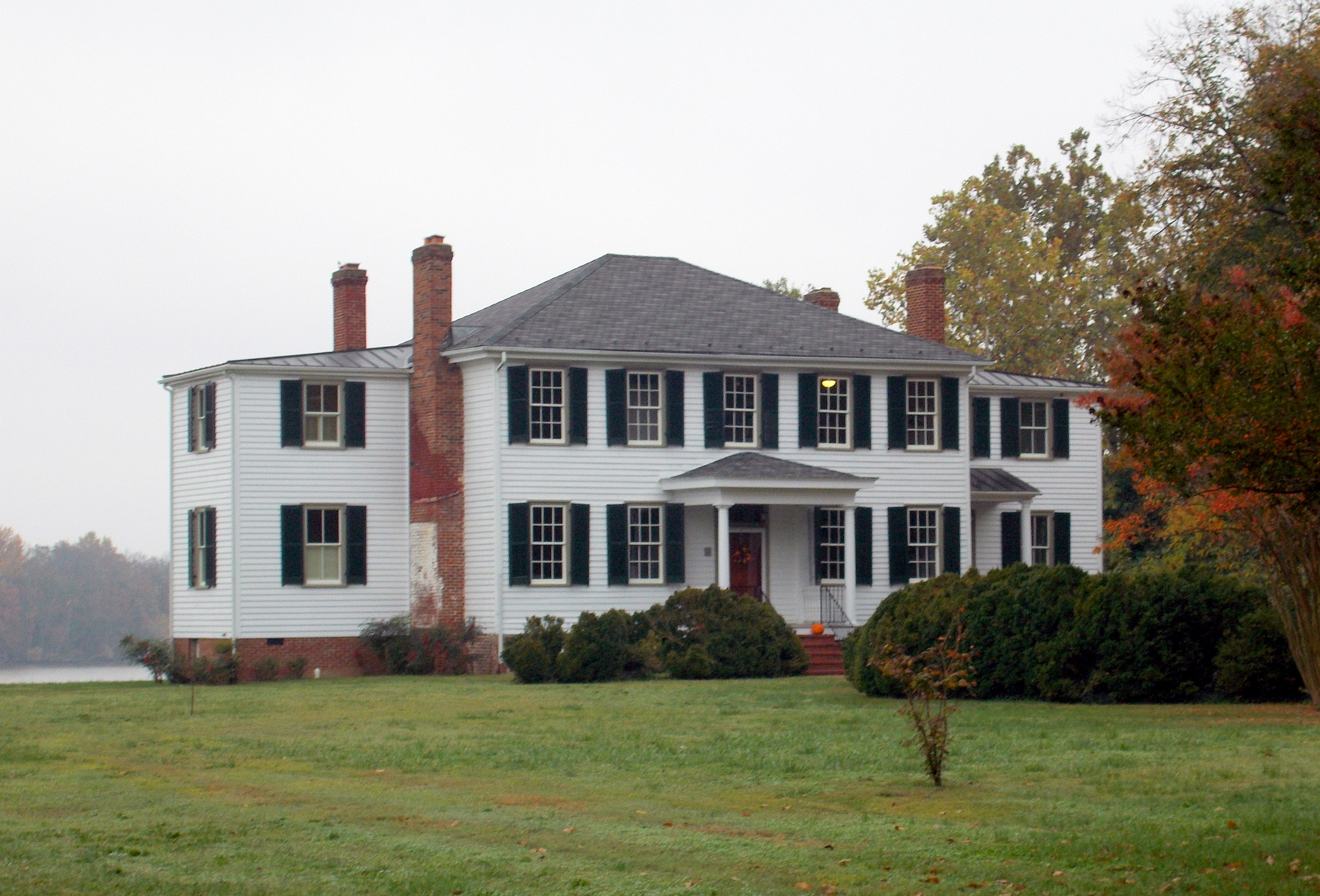
- Riverview, October 2012

- Location within Virginia Location within the United States
- Location: Water St., Port Royal, Virginia
- Coordinates: 38°10′15″N 77°11′17″W
- Area: 1.2 acres (0.49 ha)
- Built: c. 1845-1846
- Architectural style: Greek Revival
- NRHP reference No.: 94000792
- VLR No.: 284-0003

Significant dates
- Added to NRHP: July 29, 1994
- Designated VLR: April 20, 1994

Riverview, or Lightfoot House, is a historic home located at Port Royal, Caroline County, Virginia. It was built about 1845–1846, and is a two-story, five bay frame structure with a double-pile plan in the Greek Revival style. It has a hipped roof and sits on a brick basement. Also on the property is a contributing meathouse.

It was listed on the National Register of Historic Places in 1994. It is located in the Port Royal Historic District
