= Gay Mont =

Historic house in Virginia, United States

- "Gaymont" or "Rose Hill"
- U.S. National Register of Historic Places
- Virginia Landmarks Register
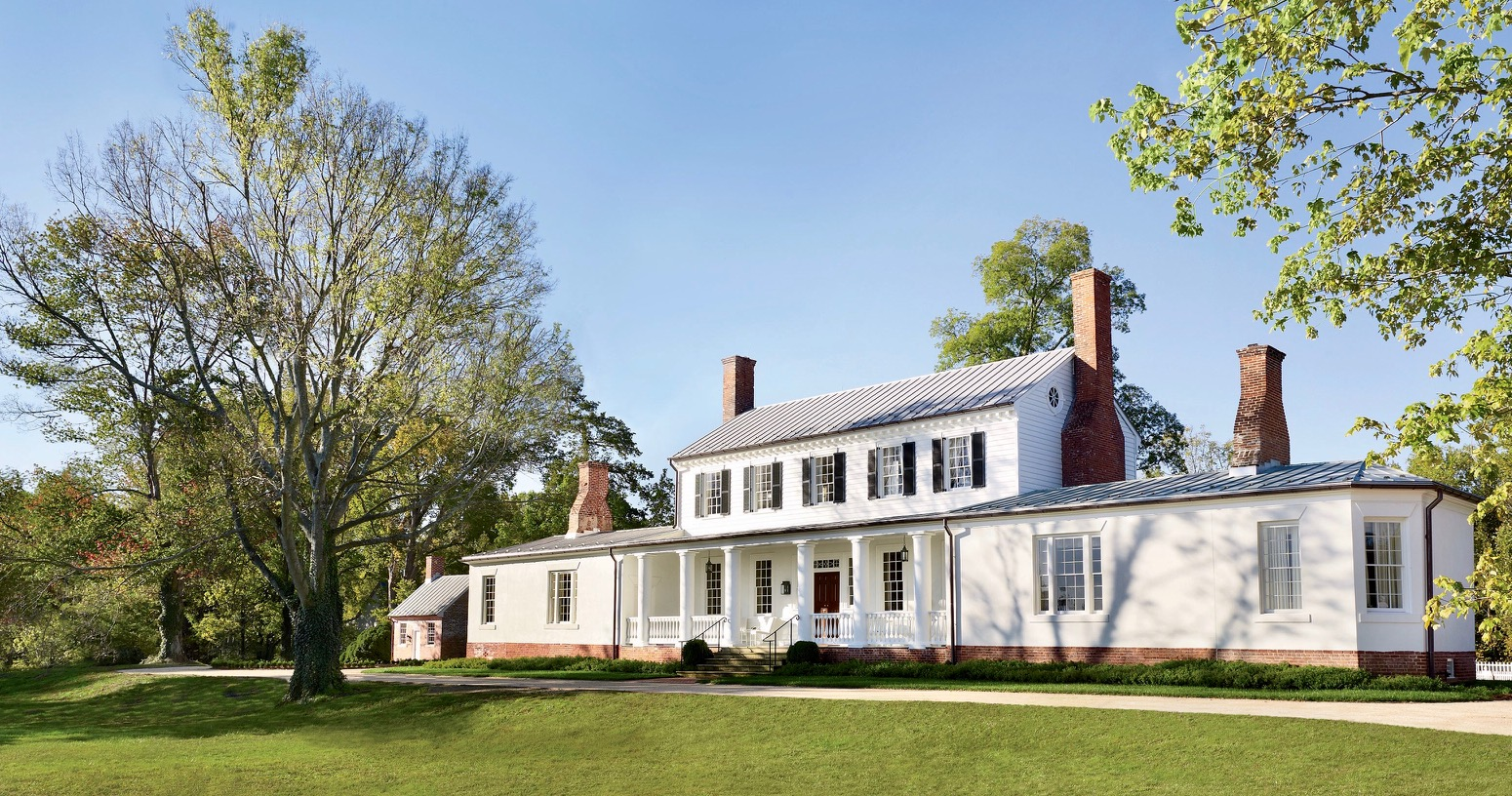
- Gaymont

- Location within Virginia Location within the United States
- Location: Off U.S. 17 near jct. with U.S. 301, Port Royal, Virginia
- Coordinates: 38°10′26″N 77°13′49″W
- Area: 318.5 acres (128.9 ha)
- Built: c. 1790
- NRHP reference No.: 72001387
- VLR No.: 016-0032

Significant dates
- Added to NRHP: May 19, 1972
- Designated VLR: January 18, 1972

Gaymont, or Gay Mont, is a historic home located at Port Royal, Caroline County, Virginia. Originally called "Rose Hill", the central section of the house was built about 1790 by John Hipkins as a two-story frame structure with a gable roof and two exterior end chimneys. His grandson and heir, John Hipkins Bernard, renamed the house in honor of his wife, Jane Gay Bolling Robertson, a descendant of Pocahontas. It was enlarged in 1819 with the addition of flanking one-story stuccoed brick wings and a one-story colonnade of stuccoed brick Tuscan columns. In 1834 a one-story octagonal music room was added and in 1839 an octagonal library and office at the ends of each wing. Except for a brief 18-month change in ownership in 1958–1959, the house remained in the Bernard-Robb family until 2007 at which time it transferred to the Association for the Preservation of Virginia Antiquities. A family cemetery with almost 40 graves is set just to the north of the house along the forest edge.

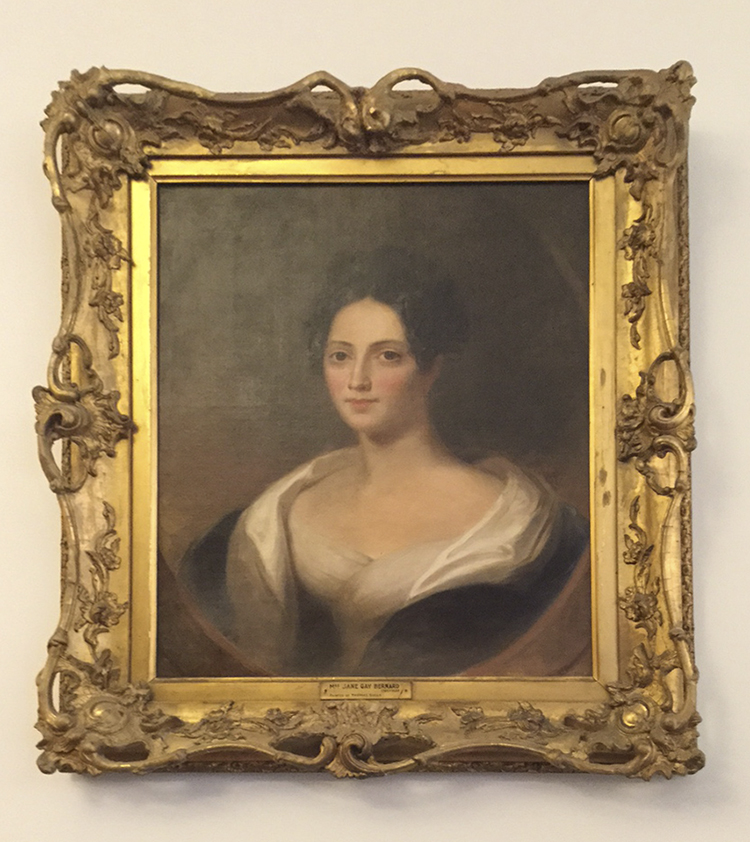
Jane Gay Robertson Bernard (1795–1852) by Thomas Sully

In June 1959, a fire of debated origin destroyed the frame center section and octagonal music room. Shortly after the fire, Frances Bernard Robb Upton Patton, the great-granddaughter of John Hipkins Bernard, repurchased the property that she and her cousins had previously sold. Together with her husband James S. Patton, she rebuilt the house and restored the garden along their original lines. This time, the center section was built as a stuccoed masonry structure and the music room foundation left as a patio. Also on the property is a contributing early brick outbuilding, probably the original kitchen.

The Patton's donated the house, contents, and land to the Association for the Preservation of Virginia Antiquities in 1975 with life tenancy for the donors. In 2007, APVA took ownership and subsequently sold it to John and Billings Cay of Charleston, SC who began a multimillion-dollar renovation of the house, including rebuilding the octagonal music room. They renamed the property "Rose Hill" as it was originally.

It was listed on the National Register of Historic Places in 1972.
