= Judith Lomax =

American poet

Judith Lomax (September 25, 1774 – January 19, 1828) was an American poet and religious writer. She was the first woman in Virginia to publish a volume of poetry entirely her own.

== Early years ==
Little is known of Lomax's early life save that she was a member of a prominent Virginia family, the daughter of Thomas and Anne Lomax of Portobago, and lived on her father's plantation until his death in 1816. Her mother was a member of the prominent Tayloe family.

== Career ==
Judith suffered a financial reverse in 1815 which led to her estrangement from a number of her relatives. She spent much of the last fourteen years of her life supporting herself while living in Port Royal, Virginia. Poor health led her to move, in 1827, to live with a sister in Fredericksburg, where she died early the following year and where she was buried in the churchyard of St. George's Episcopal Church.

Lomax never married. She is said to have preferred the company of Methodists and Baptists to that of her fellow Anglicans; her own personal faith mixed elements of the three denominations, though she remained a self-described member of the Anglican communion. She supported the activities of the American Colonization Society. She often led services in her own home, and frequently attended funerals, even if the deceased was poorly known to her, as she felt that such attendance sharpened and focused her own faith; she kept up a correspondence with missionaries in Africa, and read religious tracts in French. Ecumenically, she expressed her hope that eventually all Christians would be united under one all-encompassing church without denominations. Beginning in 1819 Lomax kept a notebook of religious writings which traces her efforts, and those of her sister, to aid in the rebuilding of the Episcopal Church in Virginia after the American Revolutionary War. The book indicates that she was of evangelical bent, and illustrates both her piety and her beliefs. She viewed it as a tool of evangelization, sharing it with young divinity students and others to whom she felt it might be of some use; she viewed her writing, both of letters and of her journal, as an important way to practice her own faith. The book was published in 1999 as The Sabbath Journal of Judith Lomax.

As a poet, Lomax is known to have exchanged lines with fellow poet Margaret Lowther Page, the wife of Governor and U.S. Representative John Page; the couple were her aunt and uncle by marriage. She was a self-declared admirer of the works of Ossian. Her book of verse, Notes of an American Lyre, was published in Richmond, Virginia in 1813, with a dedication to Thomas Jefferson. She is known to have visited Jefferson, a former acquaintance of her father's, at Monticello and written verse about the house during her career. Eleven of her poems were sent by her father to St. George Tucker for criticism; they are today held in the special collections library of the College of William and Mary in Williamsburg.
