= State Fair of Virginia =

Annual state fair

Coordinates: 37°51′3.12″N 77°25′18.33″W

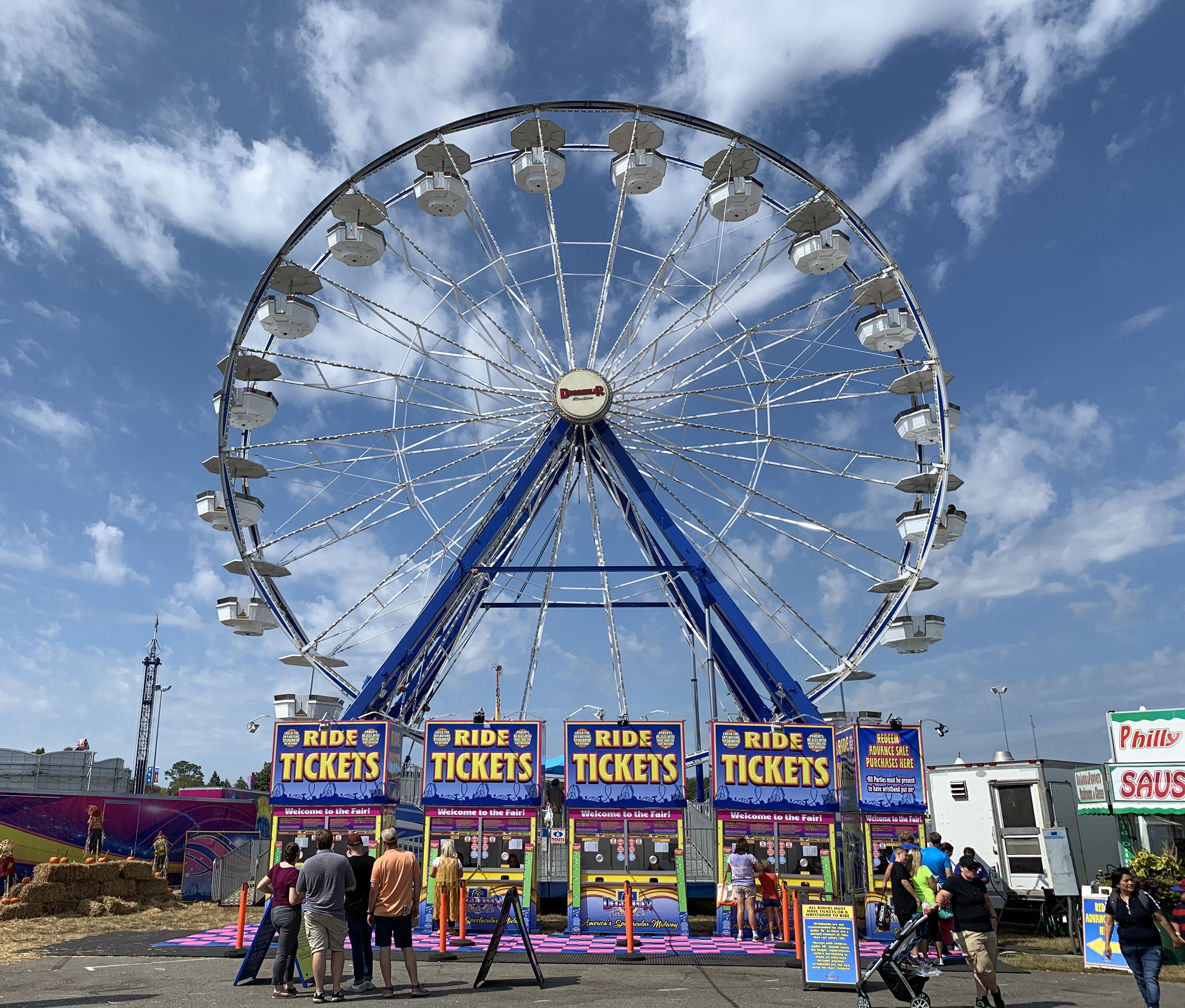
- Ferris wheel at the 2019 State Fair of Virginia
- Genre: State fair
- Dates: Late September – Early October
- Frequency: Annually
- Locations: Meadow Event Park, Doswell, Virginia; United States
- Inaugurated: 1854
- Website: www.statefairva.org

The State Fair of Virginia is a state fair held annually at the end of September at the Meadow Event Park in Doswell, Virginia. Through 2008, the fair was held at the Richmond Raceway Complex, located in eastern Henrico County, just outside the capital city of Richmond. It is owned by the Virginia Farm Bureau Federation.

The Fair has offered rides, carnival games, concerts, and typical fair foods such as cotton candy and funnel cakes, as well as barbecue chicken and peanuts. The Fair has also offered technological, agricultural, historical, and livestock exhibitions and competitions, including pig races. Several of the competitions offered scholarships to students that competed. Entertainment includes log-rolling, chain sawing, pig races, snake handling, magicians, and stilt-walking. Vendors sell clothing, belt buckles, and other items with novelty designs.

The expositions have included "Virginia World", which highlighted Virginia agricultural products, the better living center which hosted the arts & craft competition displays, the technology expo which highlighted Virginia technology industry, and "Young McDonald's Farm" which displayed a variety of young animals for the urban visitor to see. Additionally, one section of the Fair has included a "Heritage Village" which displayed Native American, African American, and Euro-American history in the Commonwealth of Virginia.

== Rides ==
There is a special section of the park with rides for children aged 4 or 5; those aged 6–12 have all the options of the 4- and 5-year-olds, plus the merry-go-round and the airplane rider, which goes around in a circle at slow speed. All 12-year-old (or older) individuals have access to all the rides as long as they be at least 61 inches tall.

== History ==
The Fair moved to its new location in 2009 at the Meadow Event Park in Caroline County. This multi-use space of 360 acres (1.5 km^{2}) includes a 75,000-square-foot (7,000 m^{2}) exposition hall, a 10,000-square-foot (930 m^{2}) multi-purpose pavilion, a horse-stall barn with 143 stalls, and an equine facility with four show rings, to accommodate local and regional horse shows and other equine events. The Meadow Event Park is on the site of Meadow Farm, the thoroughbred horse farm owned by Christopher Chenery that was the breeding home of back-to-back racing greats Riva Ridge and Secretariat, the winners of five of the six Triple Crown races in 1972 and 1973. No fair was held in 1861–64, 1917–18, 1942–45 & 2020.

=== Farm Bureau purchase ===
In March 2012, the fair's parent company filed for chapter 7 bankruptcy, putting the fair on hold for the first time in its history. Reasons for the non-profit's bankruptcy included the high costs for converting Meadow Farm into Meadow Event Park. All events that the company ran were cancelled, except for the horse race at Colonial Downs. On May 22, 2012, Universal Fairs, based in suburban Memphis, purchased the assets of State Fair of Virginia in bankruptcy court. In July 2012, the Virginia Farm Bureau Federation purchased an ownership interest and partnered with Universal Fairs, who plan to continue the fair. The Farm Bureau bought the remaining shares in 2013.
