= Hazelwood (Port Royal, Virginia) =

Archaeological site in Virginia, United States

- U.S. National Register of Historic Places
- Virginia Landmarks Register
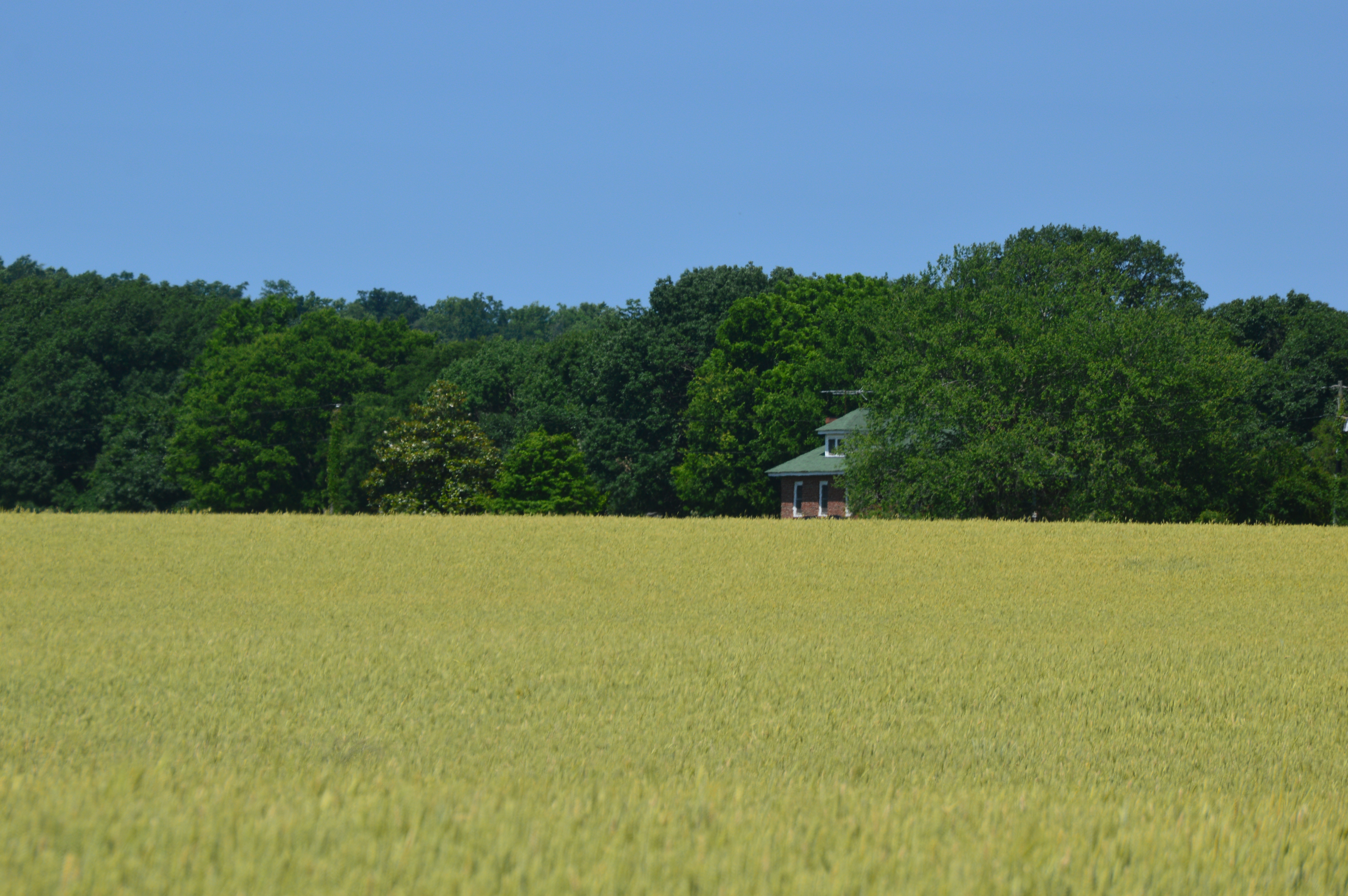
- Fields at the site
- Nearest city: Port Royal, Virginia
- Area: 130 acres (53 ha)
- Built: 1750
- NRHP reference No.: 74002111
- VLR No.: 016-0058

Significant dates
- Added to NRHP: January 11, 1974
- Designated VLR: June 19, 1973

Hazelwood is a historic archaeological site located at Port Royal, Caroline County, Virginia. It was the site of the historic house and plantation "Hazelwood", home of political economist and U.S. Senator John Taylor of Caroline (1753–1824). The house was built about 1750 and destroyed during the American Civil War.

Hazelwood was listed on the National Register of Historic Places in 1974.
