= Portobago, Virginia =

Unincorporated community in Virginia, United States

Coordinates: 38°08′55″N 77°07′44″W

Portobago, on the south shore of Rappahannock River, is an unincorporated community in Caroline County, in the U.S. state of Virginia. Its name originates from the old village, probably belonging to the Nandtaughtacund Powhatans during the 17th century.

Poet Judith Lomax was the daughter of Thomas and Anne Lomax of Portobago, and lived at her father's plantation until his death in 1816, whereupon she moved to Port Royal.
