= Townfield (Port Royal, Virginia) =

Historic house in Virginia, United States

- U.S. National Register of Historic Places
- U.S. Historic district – Contributing property
- Virginia Landmarks Register
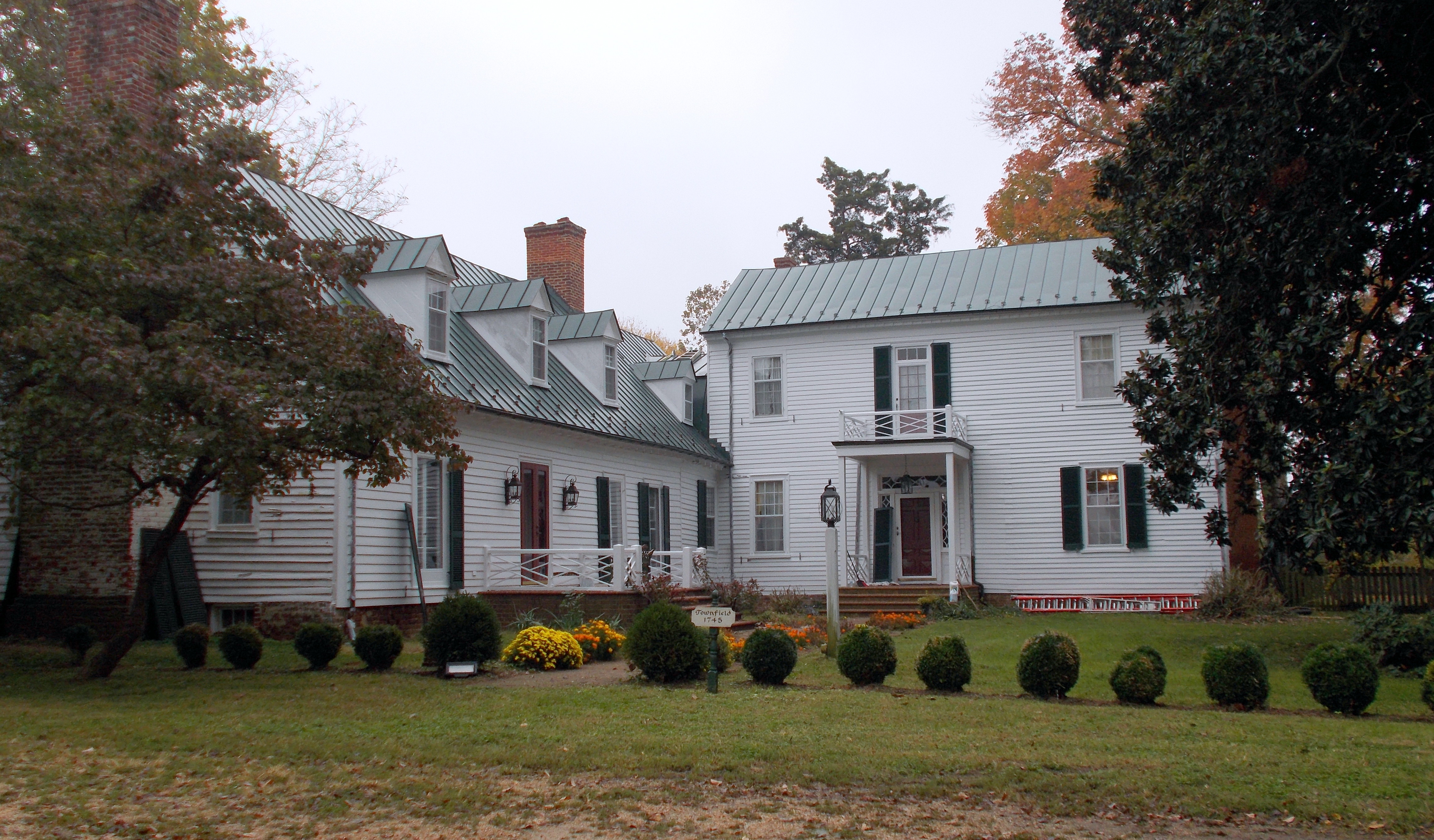
- Townfield, October 2012

- Location within Virginia Location within the United States
- Location: Water St., Port Royal, Virginia
- Coordinates: 38°10′12″N 77°11′18″W
- Area: 5.9 acres (2.4 ha)
- Built: c. 1740-1747, 1823, 1857
- Built by: Gilchrist, Robert
- Architectural style: Federal, Georgian
- NRHP reference No.: 94000791
- VLR No.: 284-0015

Significant dates
- Added to NRHP: July 29, 1994
- Designated VLR: April 20, 1994

Townfield, or Robert Gilchrist House, is a historic home located at Port Royal, Caroline County, Virginia. The original section was built between 1740 and 1747, and is a 1 1/2-story, central passage plan frame dwelling in the Georgian style. It has a gable roof and dining room and a projecting pavilion addition built in 1823. Attached to the original house is a two-story, gable-roofed, Federal hall-and-parlor-plan addition, constructed in 1857 at a right angle to the dining room. This forms the stem of the overall "L" plan. Also on the property is a contributing family cemetery.

It was listed on the National Register of Historic Places in 1994. It is located in the Port Royal Historic District
