= The Grove (Hanover, Virginia) =

Historic house in Virginia, United States

- U.S. National Register of Historic Places
- Virginia Landmarks Register
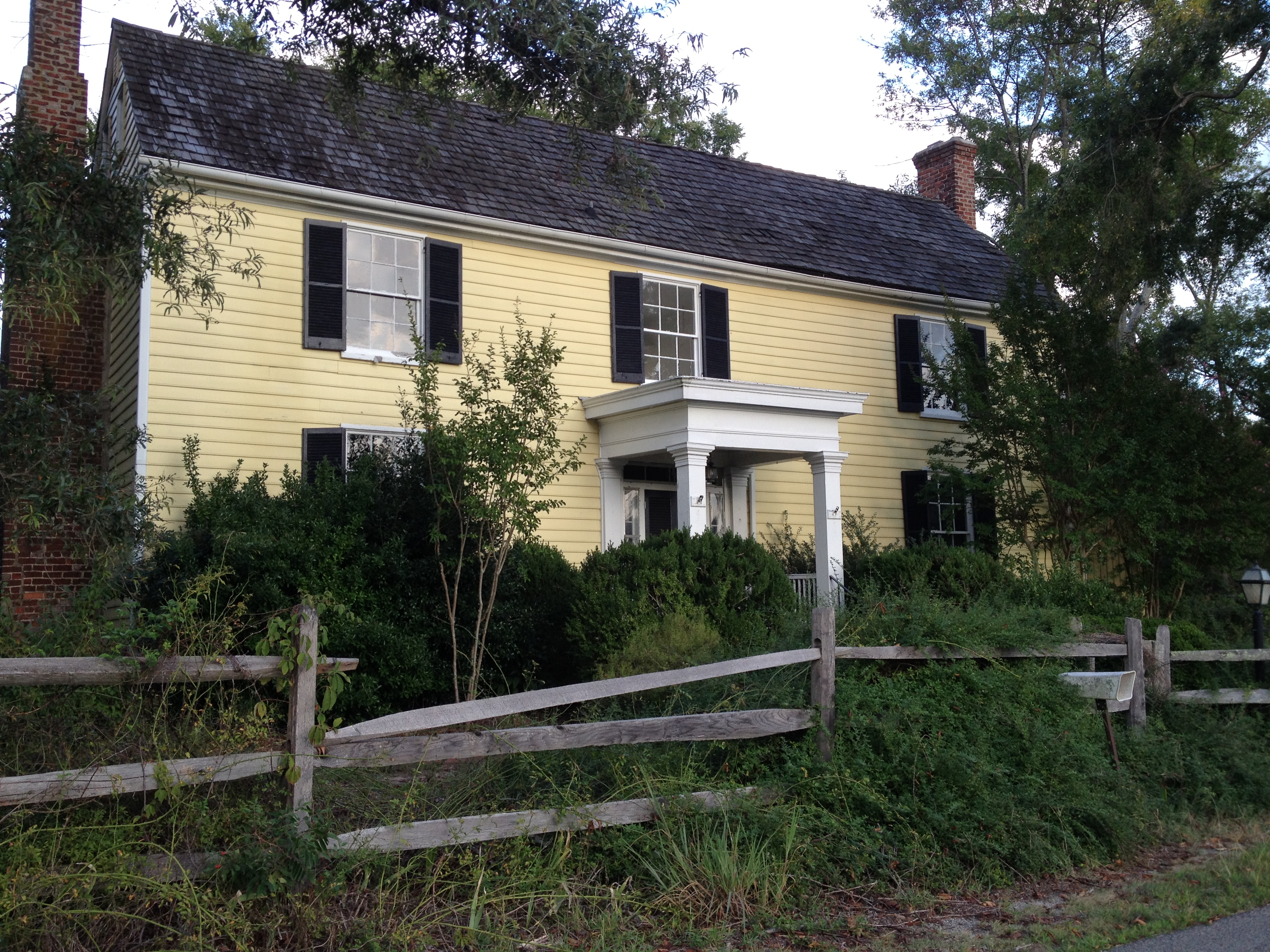

- Location within Virginia Location within the United States
- Location: 33115 Mount Gideon Rd., Hanover, Virginia
- Coordinates: 38°13′31″N 77°21′55″W
- Area: 68 acres (28 ha)
- Built: c. 1787, c. 1800
- Architectural style: Early Republic, Greek Revival, Colonial Revival
- NRHP reference No.: 09000333
- VLR No.: 016-0012

Significant dates
- Added to NRHP: May 21, 2009
- Designated VLR: March 19, 2009

The Grove is a historic home located near Hanover, Caroline County, Virginia. The original main house was built about 1787, and expanded to its present size about 1800. The main section is a 2 1/2-story, three-bay, frame dwelling with a central hall plan. It stands on a small brick foundation and has a gable roof. The 19th and 20th centuries saw the construction of additions. Also on the property are a contributing smokehouse, water tower (c. 1920), tobacco barn, family cemetery, and site of an icehouse.

It was listed on the National Register of Historic Places in 2009.
