= Edge Hill (Woodford, Virginia) =

Historic house in Virginia, United States

- U.S. National Register of Historic Places
- Virginia Landmarks Register
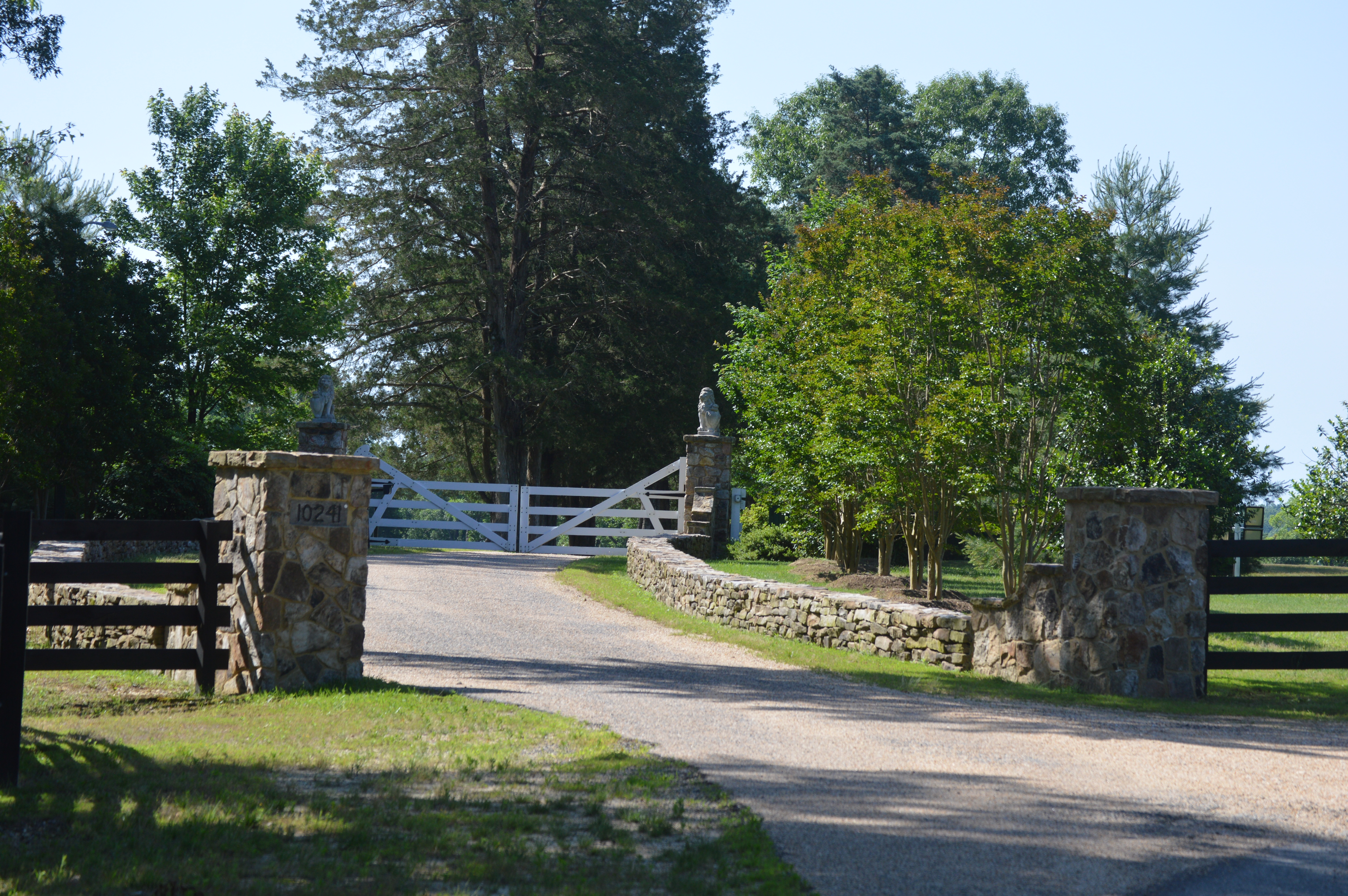
- Property entrance

- Location within Virginia Location within the United States
- Location: W of Woodford on VA 632, near Woodford, Virginia
- Coordinates: 38°7′3″N 77°27′37″W
- Area: 96 acres (39 ha)
- Built: 1821, c. 1840
- Architectural style: Greek Revival, Federal
- NRHP reference No.: 83003264
- VLR No.: 016-0006

Significant dates
- Added to NRHP: February 10, 1983
- Designated VLR: December 14, 1982

Edge Hill is a historic plantation house located near Woodford in Caroline County, Virginia, United States. It was built in two sections. The earliest dates from 1820 to 1821 and enlarged about 1840 by adding the western half, giving it a formal, symmetrical five-bay facade. It is a two-story brick dwelling with a gable roof and Federal exterior and interior detailing.

Also on the property is a large wooden building sheathed in board-and-batten siding and covered by a shallow hipped roof. It was built in 1857, as the Edge Hill Academy, a boys' school operated by the owner of Edge Hill.

It was listed on the National Register of Historic Places in 1983.
