= Prospect Hill (Fredericksburg, Virginia) =

Historic house in Virginia, United States

- U.S. National Register of Historic Places
- Virginia Landmarks Register
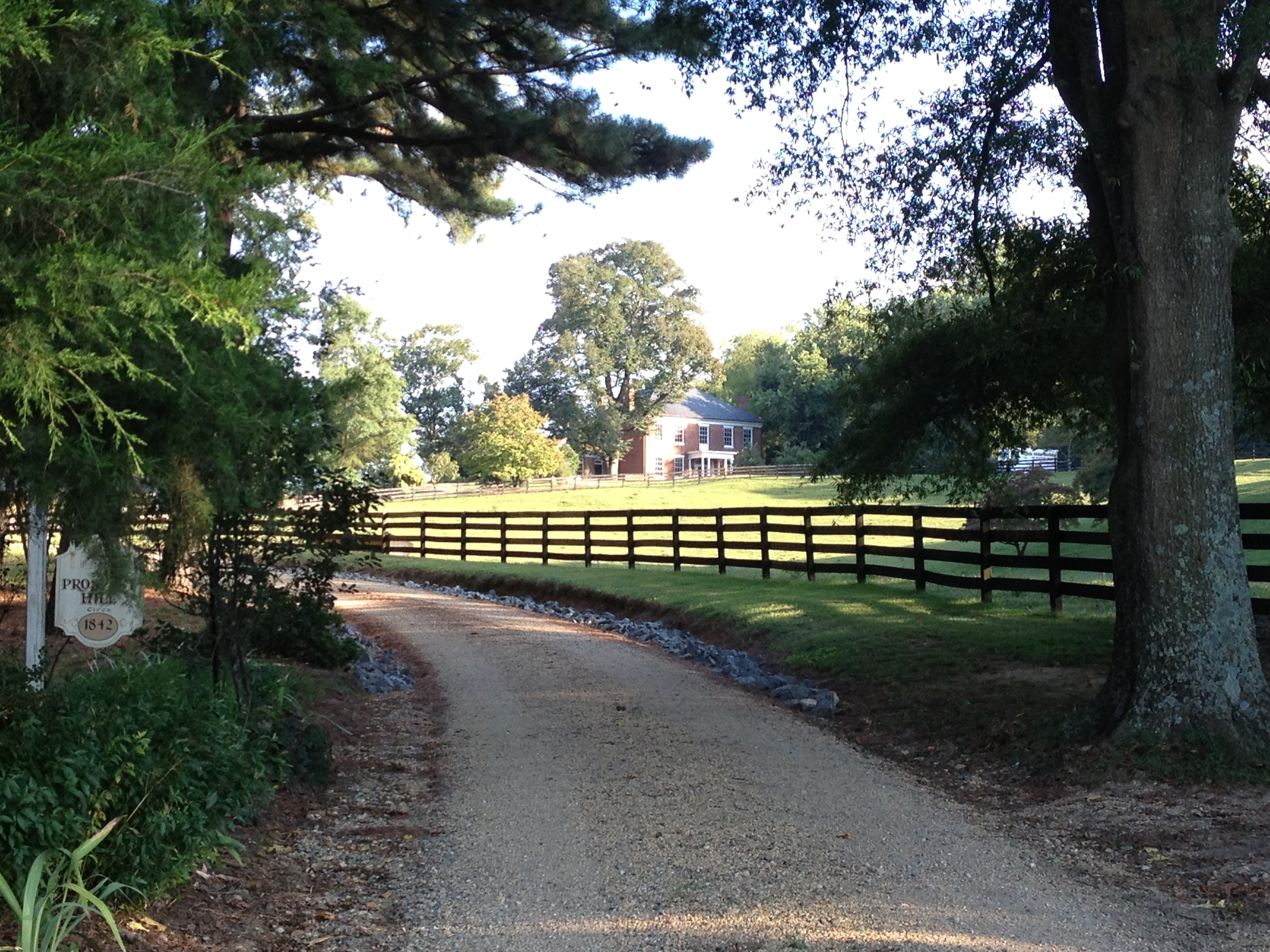

- Location within Virginia Location within the United States
- Location: SE of Fredericksburg off U.S. 17, near Fredericksburg, Virginia
- Coordinates: 38°13′31″N 77°21′55″W
- Area: 20 acres (8.1 ha)
- Built: 1842
- NRHP reference No.: 76002096
- VLR No.: 016-0019

Significant dates
- Added to NRHP: December 12, 1976
- Designated VLR: September 16, 1976

Prospect Hill is a historic plantation house located near Fredericksburg, Caroline County, Virginia. The property is entirely surrounded by lands belonging to Santee. It was built about 1842, and is a two-story, five-bay, double pile, brick dwelling. It has a high hipped roof and four interior end chimneys. It features a wide single front entrance door framed by unfluted Roman Doric order columns supporting a plain entablature. Also on the property is a contributing slave house.

It was listed on the National Register of Historic Places in 1976.
