= Corbin, Virginia =

Unincorporated community in Virginia, United States

- Unincorporated community
- Location within Virginia Location within the United States
- Coordinates: 38°11′58″N 77°23′20″W
- Country: United States
- State: Virginia
- County: Caroline
- Elevation: 213 ft (65 m)
- Time zone: UTC-5 (Eastern (EST))
  - Summer (DST): UTC-4 (EDT)
- ZIP code: 22446
- Area code: 804
- GNIS feature ID: 1495424

Corbin is an unincorporated community in Caroline County, in the U.S. state of Virginia.

The Santee plantation was placed on the National Register of Historic Places in 1979.

== Climate ==
The climate in this area is characterized by hot, humid summers and generally mild to cool winters. According to the Köppen Climate Classification system, Corbin has a humid subtropical climate, abbreviated "Cfa" on climate maps.
