= Woodford, Virginia =

Unincorporated community in Virginia, United States

- Unincorporated community
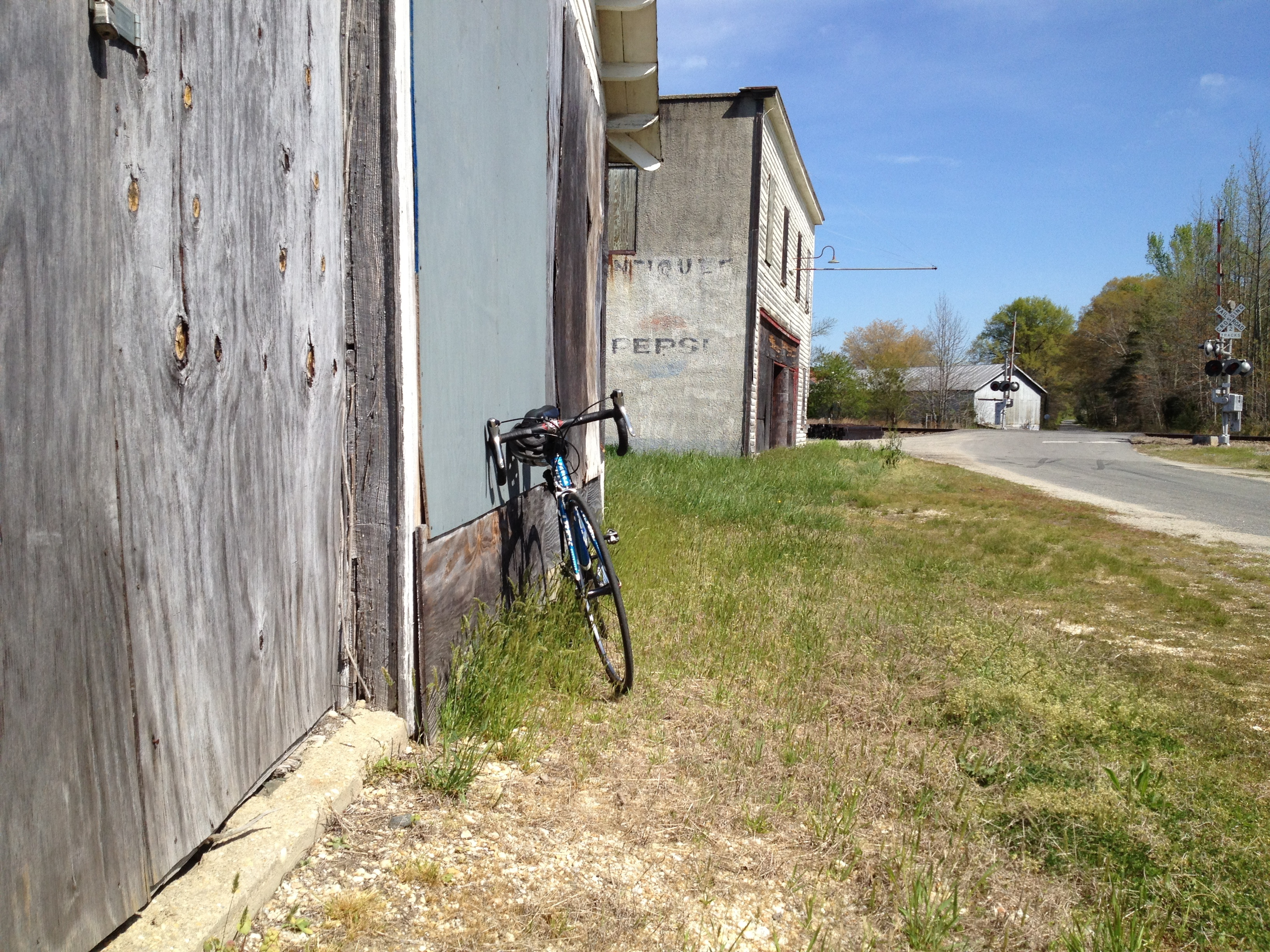

- Location within Virginia Location within the United States
- Coordinates: 38°06′47″N 77°24′32″W
- Country: United States
- State: Virginia
- County: Caroline
- Elevation: 125 ft (38 m)
- Time zone: UTC−5 (Eastern (EST))
  - Summer (DST): UTC−4 (EDT)
- ZIP code: 22580
- Area code: 804
- GNIS feature ID: 1500344

Woodford is an unincorporated community in Caroline County, in the U.S. state of Virginia. It is located primarily along Route 626 northwest of Bowling Green.

== History ==
Downer's Crossing was a place to cross the Mattaponi River when the Richmond, Fredericksburg and Potomac Railroad arrived in October 1836. By 1837, the town was named Woodford's Lane. Passengers who wanted to board the train would wave a handkerchief during the day or wave a light at night. The train did not usually stop at Woodford. With the general store, post office and train, the town began to grow from 30 citizens in the first decade of the 1900s to over a hundred by 1925. A main reason was the mill to produce excelsior, a product made from soft pines to pack furniture and fragile items for shipping, to stuff cushions for automobiles, and to reinforce gypsum wall boards. A post office called Woodford has been in operation since 1874. The community was named for William Woodford, an American Revolutionary War general. It was a stop on the Richmond, Fredericksburg and Potomac Railroad, which was replaced by CSXT.

Edge Hill was listed on the National Register of Historic Places in 1983.
