= Santee (Corbin, Virginia) =

Historic house in Virginia, United States

- U.S. National Register of Historic Places
- Virginia Landmarks Register
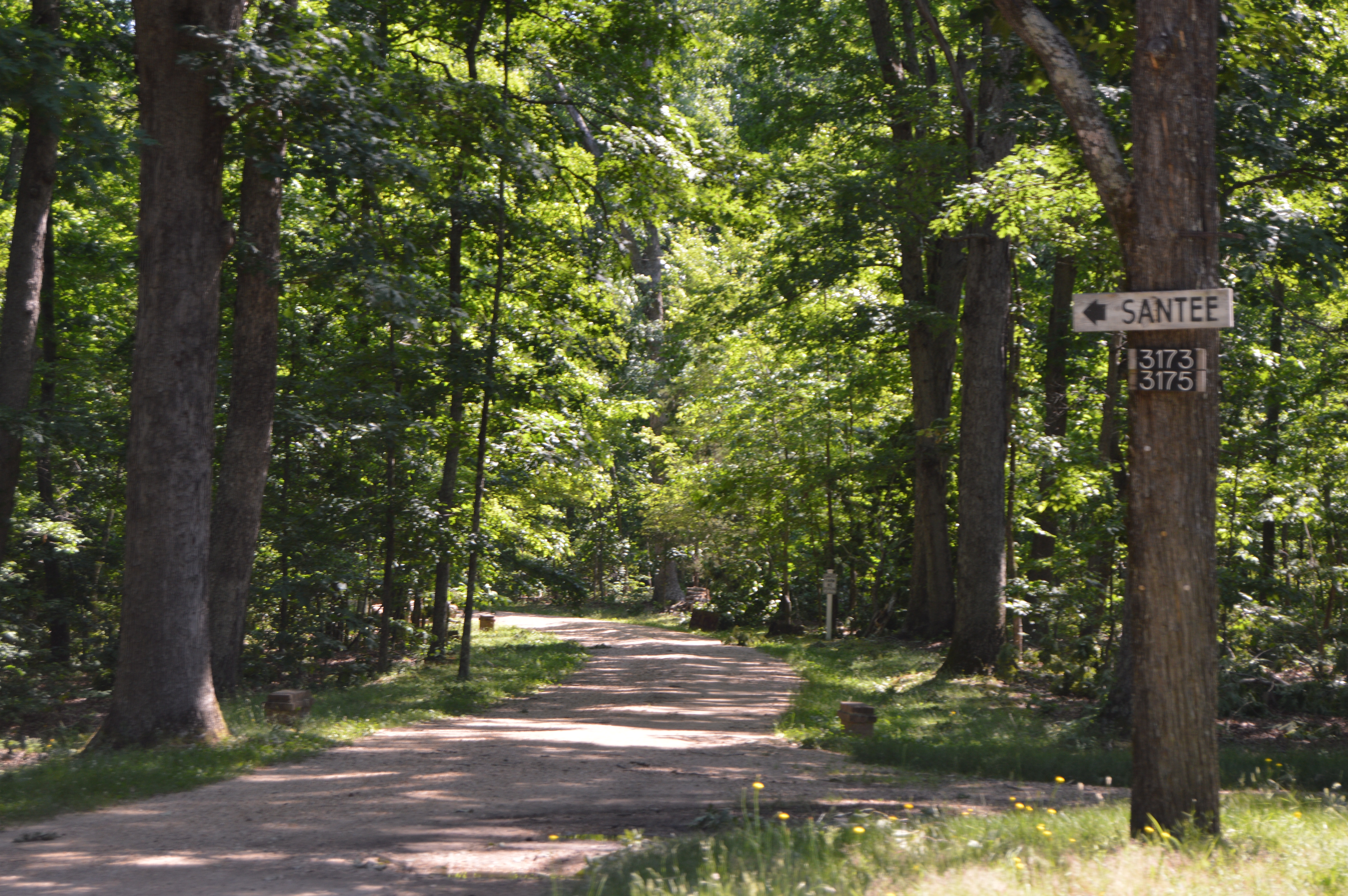
- Property entrance

- Location within Virginia Location within the United States
- Location: Off VA 610, Corbin, Virginia
- Coordinates: 38°13′03″N 77°21′40″W
- Area: 56 acres (23 ha)
- Built: c. 1820
- NRHP reference No.: 79003034
- VLR No.: 016-0023

Significant dates
- Added to NRHP: May 7, 1979
- Designated VLR: October 21, 1975

Santee is a historic farm located in Caroline County, Virginia. Construction first began in the late 18th century with additions made throughout the 19th century.

It was listed on the National Register of Historic Places in 1979.
