= Port Royal, Virginia =

- Town
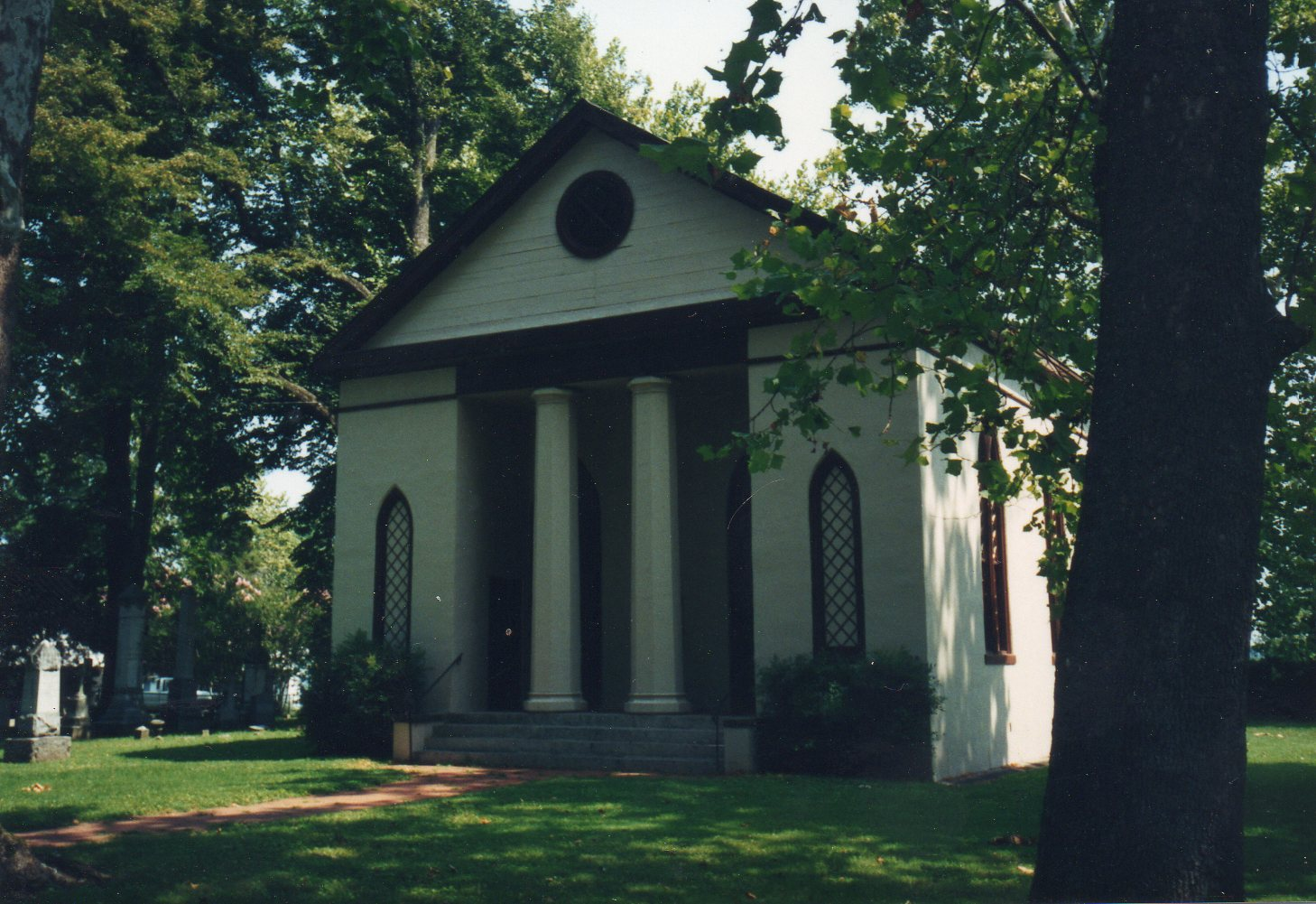
- St. Peter's Episcopal Church

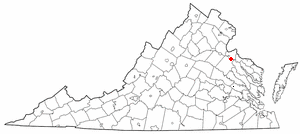
- Location of Port Royal, Virginia
- Coordinates: 38°10′11″N 77°11′27″W
- Country: United States
- State: Virginia
- County: Caroline

Area
  - Total: 0.65 sq mi (1.69 km^{2})
  - Land: 0.65 sq mi (1.68 km^{2})
  - Water: 0.0039 sq mi (0.01 km^{2})
- Elevation: 30 ft (9.1 m)

Population (2020)
  - Total: 196
  - Estimate (2019): 206
  - Density: 317.8/sq mi (122.72/km^{2})
- Time zone: UTC−5 (Eastern (EST))
  - Summer (DST): UTC−4 (EDT)
- ZIP code: 22535
- Area code: 804
- FIPS code: 51-63928
- GNIS feature ID: 1499899
- Website: www.portroyalva.org

Port Royal is an incorporated town in Caroline County, Virginia, United States. As of the 2020 census, Port Royal had a population of 196.

Port Royal was established in the mid-17th century in the Colony of Virginia primarily as a port at the head of the navigable reach of the Rappahannock River for export of tobacco, Virginia's cash crop. The town developed along an early stage road, which brought passengers and freight for embarkation on ships at the river. It is near the crossroads of the busy modern highways of U.S. Route 17 and U.S. Route 301.

== History ==
=== 17th century origins ===
Port Royal is one of the area's oldest colonial settlements. It was first established in 1652 by English colonists as a port at the head of sea-going navigation on the Rappahannock River. Waterways were the fastest and easiest method of transportation of people and property in the British colony of Virginia. It was an important point for export of tobacco, Virginia's cash crop.

Local tradition holds that Port Royal was named after the Roy family. Dorothy Roy and her husband John owned a warehouse chartered by the crown, a ferry service across the Rappahannock River to King George County, and a tavern. In the 21st century, the chimneys of the Roy house are preserved landmarks in the town.

Port Royal was incorporated as a town in 1744. The "town green", where the Town Hall and the firehouse stand today, was forever reserved "for public and civic use".

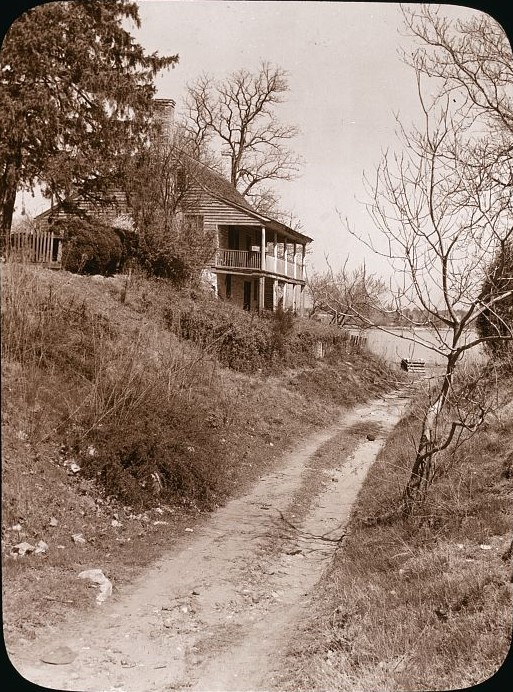
Port Royal house. Photo shows dirt road leading to river; on left, house with stone 1st floor and wooden 2nd floor. By Frances Benjamin Johnston, between 1927 and 1929

=== 19th–20th centuries ===
Shipping of goods and products from the port began to decline after completion of competing railroads in Virginia, beginning in the 1830s. But the last scheduled passenger ship service ended in 1932, supplanted by highways. However, Port Royal was served by the new highways which became U.S. Route 17 and U.S. Route 301, with their crossroads at Port Royal.

In April, 1863 before the start of the Chancellorsville Campaign, Port Royal would be captured by the 1st and 2nd Brigades of the 1st Division of the I Corps (Union Army) of the Army of the Potomac, with the 1st brigade being the famed Iron Brigade. The units who led the assault were the 24th Michigan Infantry Regiment of the Iron Brigade and the 84th New York Volunteer Infantry Regiment (14th Brooklyn Zouves) of the 2nd Brigade.

Port Royal's most notable claim to fame is that John Wilkes Booth was killed about two miles outside town by Sgt. Boston Corbett, part of a contingent of federal troops, at the now obsolete Garrett farmstead on April 26, 1865. Booth had assassinated United States President Abraham Lincoln on the night of April 14, 1865 at Ford's Theatre in Washington, DC.

Booth initially escaped through southern Maryland, fleeing to Virginia across the Potomac and Rappahannock rivers. He was cornered in a tobacco barn on the Garrett farm at sunrise. Shot through the neck and instantly paralyzed, Booth died on the porch of the Garrett house, where he was carried from the barn. David Herold, one of his accomplices, was with him and captured at the Garrett farm. He was tried, convicted, and hanged on July 7, 1865, in Washington, DC, along with other conspirators.

Poet Judith Lomax lived in Port Royal for some years.

== Geography ==
Port Royal is located in northern Caroline County at 38°10′11″N 77°11′27″W (38.169799, −77.190763), on the south bank of the Rappahannock River.

U.S. Routes 17 and 301 intersect just southwest of the town limits. US 17 leads northwest 21 miles (34 km) to Fredericksburg and southeast 27 miles (43 km) to Tappahannock, while US 301 leads northeast 17 miles (27 km) to the Governor Harry W. Nice Memorial Bridge over the Potomac River and southwest 12 miles (19 km) to Bowling Green, the Caroline County seat.

According to the United States Census Bureau, the tiny town's total area in 2010 was 0.10 square miles (0.27 km^{2}), all land. In July 2014, the county approved new boundaries, and the town quintupled in size to 481 acres (.75 square miles).

== Demographics ==
Historical population
| Census | Pop. | Note | %± |
|---|---|---|---|
| 1850 | 470 | | — |
| 1860 | 323 | | −31.3% |
| 1870 | 435 | | 34.7% |
| 1880 | 347 | | −20.2% |
| 1890 | 236 | | −32.0% |
| 1900 | 193 | | −18.2% |
| 1910 | 194 | | 0.5% |
| 1920 | 155 | | −20.1% |
| 1930 | 157 | | 1.3% |
| 1940 | 123 | | −21.7% |
| 1950 | 139 | | 13.0% |
| 1960 | 128 | | −7.9% |
| 1970 | 199 | | 55.5% |
| 1980 | 147 | | −26.1% |
| 1990 | 204 | | 38.8% |
| 2000 | 170 | | −16.7% |
| 2010 | 126 | | −25.9% |
| 2020 | 196 | | 55.6% |
U.S. Decennial Census

As of the census of 2000, there were 170 people, 72 households, and 43 families residing in the town. The population density was 1,467.9 people per square mile (547.0/km^{2}). There were 90 housing units at an average density of 777.1 per square mile (289.6/km^{2}). The racial makeup of the town was 59.41% White, 38.24% African American, 0.59% from other races, and 1.76% from two or more races. Hispanic or Latino of any race were 0.59% of the population.

There were 72 households, out of which 31.9% had children under the age of 18 living with them, 43.1% were married couples living together, 13.9% had a female householder with no husband present, and 38.9% were non-families. 31.9% of all households were made up of individuals, and 12.5% had someone living alone who was 65 years of age or older. The average household size was 2.36 and the average family size was 2.89.

In the town, the population was spread out, with 27.1% under the age of 18, 7.1% from 18 to 24, 29.4% from 25 to 44, 17.6% from 45 to 64, and 18.8% who were 65 years of age or older. The median age was 37 years. For every 100 females, there were 100.0 males. For every 100 females age 18 and over, there were 100.0 males.

The median income for a household in the town was $31,429, and the median income for a family was $33,750. Males had a median income of $23,571 versus $19,167 for females. The per capita income for the town was $15,878. None of the families and 7.2% of the population were living below the poverty line, including no under eighteens and 10.4% of those over 64.
