= List of place names of Scottish origin in the United States =

Following is a list of placenames of Scottish origin which have subsequently been applied to parts of the United States by Scottish emigrants or explorers.

There are some common suffixes. Brae in the Scots language means "hillside" or "riverbank". Burgh, alternatively spelled Burg, means "city" or "town". There are some other names based on Scottish names for natural features.

== Alabama ==
- Douglas
- Inverness, Bullock County
- Inverness, Shelby County
- Lauderdale County
- Lawrence County
- Lenox
- Lynn
- Marshall County
- McIntosh
- McKenzie

== Alaska ==
- Anderson
- Hope
- Houston
- Kincaid Park
- Point MacKenzie

== Arizona ==
- Arlington
- Black Rock
- Burnside
- Cameron
- Charleston
- Clifton
- Duncan
- Elgin
- Glendale
- Hope
- Kirkland
- McMillianville
- Saint Johns

== Arkansas ==
- Crawford County
- Dallas County
- Fordyce
- Knoxville
- Lake Hamilton
- McDougal
- McNab
- McNeil
- McRae
- Scotia
- Scott

== California ==
- Albany
- Ben Lomond Mountain AVA & Ben Lomond, California
- Bonny Doon
- Campbell
- Carmichael
- Cheviot Hills
- Denny (Denny, Falkirk)
- Dixon (Dickson)
- Galt
- Gilroy
- Glendale
- Inverness
- Irvine
- Kelso
- Loch Lomond (Reservoir nr Ben Lomond)
- Millbrae
- Montrose
- Ross
- Scotia
- Scotts Valley
- Stewartville
- Sunny Brae
- Watsonville

== Colorado ==
- Adams County
- Arlington
- Avon
- Burns
- Clifton
- Craig
- Crawford
- Dallas
- Duncan
- Dunton
- Fort Lyon
- Fleming
- Fraser
- Garfield
- Georgetown
- Glendale
- Gleneagle
- Glenwood Springs
- Greenland
- Hamilton
- Henderson
- Hillside
- Inverness
- Jamestown
- Kirk
- Lochbuie
- McCoy
- Middleton
- Moffat
- Montrose
- Morrison
- Orchard
- Roxborough Park
- Sawpit
- Springfield
- Sterling
- Waverly

== Connecticut ==
- Scotland

== Delaware ==
- Adams Crossroads
- Andersons Corner
- Arden
- Armstrong
- Clayton
- Drummond Hill
- Dunleith
- Faulkland
- Fenwick Island
- Garfield Park
- Georgetown
- Glasgow
- Glasgow Station
- Halls Landing
- Hamilton Park
- Houston
- Kirkwood
- McClellandville
- McDonalds Crossroads
- McKays Corners
- Milltown
- Milton
- Monroe Park
- Murrays Corner
- New Market
- Newport
- Oakley
- Red Lion
- Ross
- Scotts Corner
- Thompson

== District of Columbia ==
- Douglass
- Dumbarton Park
- Dunbar
- Garfield Heights
- Georgetown
- Logan Circle
- Marshall Heights
- McLean Gardens
- Montrose Park
- Mount Vernon

== Florida ==
- Aberdeen
- Campbellton
- Charleston Park
- Clifton
- Dunbar Heights
- Dundee
- Dunedin, from Dun Eideann, Scottish Gaelic for Edinburgh
- Fort Lauderdale
- Hamilton County
- Highland Park
- Highlands County
- Interlachen
- Inverness
- Irvine
- Lake Charleston
- Lake Hamilton
- Lee County
- Macclenny
- McIntosh
- Melrose
- Milton
- Paisley
- Paxton
- Port Richey
- Royal Terrace

== Georgia ==
- Aberdeen
- Albany
- Argyle (old spelling of Argyll)
- Arlington
- Buchanan
- Campbell County
- Campbellton
- Clarkston
- Clayton
- Clyde (this is a place in a city in Scotland)
- Crawford
- Crawford County
- Culloden
- Dalton
- Darien (see Darien scheme)
- Dawson County
- Douglas
- Dunbar
- Duncan Ridge
- East Albany
- Ellerslie
- Flemington
- Fort Gordon
- Fort McAllister
- Fort McIntosh
- Fort McPherson
- Fort Stewart
- Fulton County
- Georgetown (2 Counties)
- Gibson
- Glenloch
- Glenwood
- Gordon
- Greenwood
- Hamilton
- Harris County
- Houston County
- Hunter Hills
- Johnson County
- Kingston
- Kirkwood
- Lake Sinclair
- Lenox (Lennox)
- Leslie
- Livingston
- Lyons
- Mansfield
- McDuffie County
- McIntosh County
- McIntyre
- McRae
- McWhorter
- Meigs
- Monroe County
- Montgomery County
- Montrose
- Morningside
- Mount Vernon
- Murray County
- New Hope
- Newton
- New Town
- Norman Park
- Oakwood
- Patterson
- Royston
- Scotland
- Scotts Crossing
- Stewart County
- Turner County
- Waverly
- Whitfield County
- Williamson
- Young Harris

== Idaho ==
- Aberdeen
- Drummond
- McCall
- McCammon
- Mackay
- Wallace

== Illinois ==
- Albany
- Bannockburn
- Bellmont
- Bonnie
- Broughton
- Caledonia
- Dundee Township (2 counties)
- Dunfermline
- East Dundee
- East Gillespie
- Elgin (named after a Scottish hymn)
- Glasgow
- Glencoe
- Glenwood
- Inverness
- Lanark
- Midlothian
- West Dundee

== Indiana ==
- Aberdeen, Ohio County
- Aberdeen, Porter County
- Abington
- Adams
- Albany
- Alexandria
- Alford
- Ashley
- Avon
- Ayrshire
- Barr Township
- Barrick Corner
- Belmont
- Blaine
- Bloomfield
- Bridgeton
- Buchanan
- Burns City
- Caledonia
- Campbell Township
- Campbelltown
- Castleton
- Charlestown
- Clifton
- Colburn
- Cowan
- Dunbar Bridge
- Dundee
- Dunlap
- Edinburgh
- Elliott
- Fincastle
- Georgetown
- Gifford
- Glen Eden
- Glendale
- Glenwood
- Green Hill
- Greenfield
- Guthrie
- Hamilton County
- Harwood
- Hope
- Hough Creek
- Houston
- Inverness
- Iona
- Jamestown
- Keith Ridge
- Kelso Township
- Kennedy
- Kingsford Heights
- Kingston
- Kirk Hill
- Kyle
- Lake Bruce
- Lewis
- Linwood
- Logan
- Lynn
- Lyons
- Mackey
- Mackie
- Mansfield
- Markle
- Marshall
- McAllister Bridge
- McCallister Hill
- McCameron
- McClelland
- McClures Lake
- McCormicks Creek
- McCracken Creek
- McCrea Hill
- McCutchanville
- McFadden Creek
- McIntyre Creek
- McKillip Ditch
- McKinley
- Milltown
- Milport
- Milton
- Monroe
- Morton
- Mount Ayr
- Mount Sterling
- Mount Vernon
- Mull
- Murray
- New Albany (named after Albany, New York, in turn named after Alba)
- New Hope
- Newburgh
- Newton Stewart
- North Highland
- Oak Hill
- Oakley
- Ossian (after MacPherson's Ossian)
- Perth
- Preston
- Rob Roy
- Ross
- Rutherford
- Scotchtown
- Scotland
- Scott
- Scott Corner
- Scott County
- Scotts Ridge
- Scottsburg
- Stanley
- Sterling Heights
- Stewart
- Upland
- Wallace
- Waverly
- West Middleton
- Winfield
- Youngs Corner

== Iowa ==
- Adams
- Albany
- Allerton
- Alloway Creek
- Anderson
- Andrews
- Angus
- Argyle
- Arlington
- Armstrong
- Ashton
- Avon
- Ayrshire
- Barclay
- Barnes
- Bell Creek
- Belmont
- Berwick
- Blaine
- Blairsburg
- Blairstown
- Bluebell Creek
- Bruce
- Buchanan County
- Burnett Creek
- Burnside
- Caledonia
- Cameron
- Campbell Creek
- Ceres
- Charleston
- Clayton
- Clyde
- Coulter
- Covington
- Craig(s)
- Crawford
- Crawfordsville
- Crombie
- Dale
- Dallas
- Dean
- Dewar
- Douglas Township
- Dumfries
- Dunbar
- Duncan
- Dundee
- Dunlap
- Dysart
- Edinburg
- Elgin
- Elrick Junction
- Fraser
- Fulton
- Garfield Township
- Gifford
- Glasgow
- Glenwood
- Greenfield
- Hamilton
- Harris
- Henderson
- Hepburn
- Highland Township
- Howe
- Humeston
- Jamestown
- Kennedy
- Kingston
- Kinross
- Kirkville
- Lake MacBride
- Lamont
- Lenox
- Leslie
- Lewis
- Littleton
- Livingston
- Loch Ayr
- Loch Burns
- Logan
- Lynn
- Lyon
- MacKey
- Magill Creek
- Malcom
- Marshall
- Maud
- Maxwell
- McCallsburg
- McClelland
- McClure Creek
- McCreath Creek
- McFarland Park
- McGregor
- McGruder Creek
- McIntire
- McIntosh Woods State Park
- McMaster Creek
- McNeil Ditch
- McPherson
- Melrose
- Milton
- Monroe
- Montrose
- Morningside
- Morton
- Mount Ayr
- Mount Sterling
- Mount Vernon
- Murray
- New Albany
- Newton
- Ossian (Ossian)
- Paton
- Patterson
- Rock Glen
- Ross
- Ruthven
- Scotch Grove
- Scotch Glen
- Scott
- Scott County
- Scott Township
- Sinclair
- Stanhope
- Stanley
- Sterling
- Stewart Creek
- Stuart
- Tennant
- Wick
- Williamson

== Kansas ==
- Athol (Atholl)
- Logan County
- Scott County

== Kentucky ==
- Aberdeen
- Glasgow
- Glencoe
- Glenview

== Louisiana ==
- Albany
- Alexandria
- Bernice
- Cameron & Cameron Parish
- Clayton
- Gretna
- Henderson
- Livingston & Livingston Parish
- Lockport
- Mansfield
- Martin
- McNary
- Monroe
- Scott
- Simpson
- South Mansfield
- Stanley
- Wallace

== Maine ==
- North Berwick

== Maryland ==
- Aberdeen
- Abington
- Arden on the Severn
- Ashton
- Athol
- Belhaven Beach
- Benfield
- Birkwood Estates
- Blackwater
- Bonnie Brae
- Bonnie Brook
- Braeburn
- Burnside Acres
- Bushwood
- Campbell
- Carmichael
- Castleton
- Chapel Woods
- Charleston
- Charlestown
- Charlton
- Chevy Chase (see "The Ballad of Chevy Chase")
- Church Hill
- Clayton Manor
- Clifton Beach
- Clydesdale Acres
- Collison Corner
- Cove
- Craigtown
- Dalton
- Drummond
- Dunwood
- Ellerslie
- Elliot
- Fenwick
- Ferguson
- Furnace
- Gilmore
- Glen
- Glen Burnie
- Glen Farms
- Glenarden
- Glenarm
- Glencoe
- Glenelg
- Glenn Dale
- Green Hill
- Greenfield Estates
- Greenock
- Hamilton
- Harris
- Harwood
- Highfield
- Highland
- Highland Park
- Highlandtown
- Hope
- Hutton
- Kilburnie
- Kings Park
- Kingston
- Kirkwood
- Knollwood
- Leslie
- Lewis
- Lime Kiln
- Linton Springs
- Loch Haven
- Loch Lynn Heights
- Lochearn
- Longridge
- Longwoods
- Lyons Creek
- Mayfield
- McAlpine
- McCleans Corner
- McComas Beach
- McConchie
- McCoole
- McCoys Ferry
- McDaniel
- McDonald
- McGhiesport
- McHenry
- McKay Beach
- McKenzie
- Melrose
- Midlothian, Maryland
- Milton
- Montrose
- Morningside
- Mount Vernon
- Muirkirk
- New Market
- Newburg
- Oakley
- Oakwood
- Oldtown
- Park Hall
- Preston
- Red Hill
- Red Point
- Redhouse
- Redland
- Scarff
- Scotland
- Scotland Beach
- Scots Fancy
- St. Andrews
- Stanley
- Starr
- Walston
- Waverly
- Whiteford
- Wilton Farm
- Wolf Hill
- Woolford

== Massachusetts ==
- Aberdeen
- Alford
- Ashfield
- Athol (Atholl)
- Belmont
- Blackburn
- Brodie Mountain
- Campbell Falls
- Charlestown
- Clayton
- Cunningham Park
- Dalton
- Douglas
- East Douglas
- East Mansfield
- Farr River
- Fife Brook
- Glendale
- Glenwood
- Hamilton
- Highland
- Highland Park
- Howe
- Lamberton Brook
- Lenox (Lennox)
- Lenox Dale
- Lewis Island
- Linwood
- Longwood
- Mansfield
- Marshall Corner
- McDonald Brook
- McIver Brook
- McKnight
- McLean Reservoir
- Melrose
- Monroe
- Montrose
- Mount Sterling
- Mount Vernon
- Mungo Corner
- New Lenox
- Paxton
- Renfrew
- Riverside
- Scott Corners
- South Athol
- South Hamilton
- Stanley
- Sterling
- Wallace Pond
- Ward Hill
- Waverley
- West Brookfield
- West Mansfield
- West Newton
- West Northfield
- West Sterling

== Michigan ==
- Adams Township
- Alba
- Alma
- Arden
- Argyle
- Arlington Township
- Armstrong Corners
- Ashton
- Ayr
- Barnes Lake
- Belmont
- Bloomfield
- Brookfield
- Bruce Crossing
- Buchanan
- Burnside
- Burnside
- Calderwood
- Caledonia
- Caledonia Township (three townships)
- Campbell
- Castleton Township
- Charleston
- Chester
- Churchill Township
- Clarkston
- Clayton
- Clifton Mill
- Clyde
- Covington
- Crawford
- Crossroads
- Dale
- Douglas
- Drummond
- Dryburg
- Duncan Township
- Dundee
- East Highland
- Ewen
- Fenwick
- Ferguson Corners
- Fife Lake
- Fulton
- Galloway
- Glencoe
- Glendale
- Glengary, Commerce Township, Michigan
- Glenwood
- Gordon
- Grant
- Greenfield Village
- Guthrie
- Gregory, Undilla Township
- Hamilton
- Hamilton Township (three townships)
- Harris
- Hatton
- Henderson
- Highland
- Inverness Township
- Jamestown
- Kelso Junction
- Kingford
- Kingston
- Kinross
- Lenox Township
- Leslie
- Lewiston
- Linwood
- Livingston
- Livingston County
- Lockport
- Lockwood
- Lyons
- Mansfield
- Martin
- Mayfield
- McBain
- McBrides
- McClain State Park
- McClure
- McComb Corner
- McDonald
- McFarland
- McGregor
- McIntyre Landing
- McIvor
- McKain Corners
- McKinley
- McLeods Corner
- McMillan
- Melrose Township
- Middleton
- Milton
- Moffatt Township
- Monroe
- Montrose
- Morey
- Mount Vernon
- Muir
- Munroe Township
- Murray Lake
- New Dalton
- Newburg
- Newfield Township
- Newhaven Township
- Newkirk Township
- Newport
- North Adams
- North Leslie
- Oakley
- Paxton
- Preston Corners
- Redford
- Riverside
- Ross
- Royston
- Saint Johns
- Salisbury
- Scott Lake
- Scottdale
- Scotts
- South Greenwood
- South Lyon
- South Monroe
- Stanley Corners
- Sterling
- Stirlingville
- Stronach
- Temple
- Wallace
- Waverly
- West Highland

== Minnesota ==
- Albany
- Annandale
- Argyle
- Caledonia
- Caledonia Township
- Dumfries
- Dundas
- Dundee
- Edina
- Elgin
- Fergus Falls
- Glasgow Township, Wabasha County
- Glencoe
- Harris
- Iona
- Lismore
- Montrose
- Nevis
- Rothsay

== Mississippi ==
- Aberdeen
- Belmont
- Bruce
- Caledonia
- Covington County
- Crawford
- Duncan
- Fulton
- Inverness

== Missouri ==
- Adams Township
- Alba
- Albany
- Alexandria
- Allendale
- Allenton
- Anderson
- Angus
- Arden
- Argyle
- Arlington
- Armstrong
- Ashley
- Ashton
- Athol
- Avon
- Barnes Creek
- Baxter Ponds
- Berwick Township
- Blackburn
- Blackwater
- Blair Ridge
- Bloomfield
- Bridgeton
- Buchanan County
- Burns
- Bute
- Caledonia
- Cameron
- Campbell
- Campbellton
- Carrington
- Celt
- Charlton
- Charleston
- Clarkton
- Clayton
- Cliff
- Clifton
- Clyde
- Corry
- Cove
- Covington
- Cowan Bluff
- Craig
- Crawford County
- Crossroads
- Crown Center
- Cunningham Township
- Dallas County
- Dalton
- Dean
- Douglas County
- Drum
- Duncan
- Dundee
- Dunlap
- Dunn
- Dye
- Dykes
- East Dallas Township
- East Fulton Township
- Fenwick
- Ferguson
- Flemington
- Forbes
- Ford City
- Fort Davidson
- Fulton
- Furnace Creek
- Galloway
- Georgetown
- Glasgow
- Glasgow Village
- Glen Town
- Glenaire
- Glenallen
- Glencoe
- Glendale
- Glenwood
- Gordon Creek
- Grant City
- Greenfield
- Greenwood
- Gretna
- Guthrie Township
- Halls
- Hamilton
- Harris
- Hartwell
- Harwood
- Halton
- Hecla (see Hecla, South Uist, Scotland)
- Henderson
- Hermitage
- Highland Township
- Hope
- Houston
- Hume
- Hunter
- Jamestown
- Jedburg
- Kelso
- Kenmoor
- Kinloch
- Kirk
- Kirkwood
- Kyle
- Lenox
- Leslie
- Lewis County
- Linn
- Little Burns Mountain
- Livingston County
- Loch Leonard Lake
- Lockwood
- Logan
- Lynn
- Mansfield
- Marshall
- Maud
- Mayfield
- McAllister Springs
- McBaine
- McBride
- McClure Cave
- McCormick Cave
- McCracken
- McDaniel Lake
- McDonald County
- McDowell
- McGill Creek
- McHenry Hollow
- McIntosh
- McKee Spring
- McKenzie Creek
- McKinley
- McKinney Creek
- McLean Creek
- McMinn Spring
- McMullin
- McMurry Spring
- McMurtrey
- McQueen Bend
- McWilliams Creek
- Melrose
- Mercer
- Middleton Township
- Midland Township
- Monroe County
- Montrose
- Mount Sterling
- Mount Vernon Township
- Murray Township
- North Galloway Township
- North Patton
- Oakwood Park
- Old Monroe
- Orchard
- Patterson
- Patton
- Piper
- Preston
- Rea
- Redford
- Riverside
- Rose Hill Township
- Ross Lake
- Russell Mountain
- Rutherford Cave
- Saline County
- Salisbury
- Scotia
- Scotland
- Scotland County
- Scotsdale
- Scott City
- Scotts Corner
- Smithton
- South Gifford
- South Greenfield
- South Galloway Township
- Stanley
- Sterling
- Stewart
- Sutherland
- Swinton
- Thompson
- Wallace
- West Dallas Township
- West Fulton Township
- West Glasgow
- Weston
- Westwood
- Whiteside
- Wilton

== Montana ==
- Ballantine
- Busby
- Fergus County
- Forsyth
- Frazer
- Glasgow
- Glendive
- Hamilton
- Huntley (Huntley, Scottish Borders)
- Inverness
- Kerr
- Lake McDonald
- Livingston

== Nebraska ==
- Adams
- Albion
- Alexandria
- Andrews
- Angus
- Arlington
- Ashton
- Ayr
- Baxter
- Beechwood
- Belmont
- Blaine
- Blair
- Cameron
- Campbell
- Chester
- Clyde
- Elgin
- Firth
- Fordyce
- Glenrock
- Knoxville
- Lynn
- Montrose
- Scotia
- Scotia Junction

== Nevada ==
- Adams Creek
- Anderson Homestead
- Arden Siding
- Ashton
- Auld Lang Syne Peak
- Bannock
- Barclay Siding
- Belmont
- Black Rock
- Blair and Logan Springs
- Bonnie Claire
- Burns Creek
- Campbell Valley
- Castle Rock
- Charleston
- Clan Alpine
- Clayton Valley
- Clifton
- Craig Station
- Currie
- Dalton Canyon
- Davidson Peak
- Douglas
- Dunlap Mill
- Elgin
- Fife Mountain
- Fort McDermitt
- Glendale
- Hamilton
- Highland Peak
- Jamestown
- Kennedy
- Kingston
- Lewis
- Lockwood
- Logan
- Lynn Creek
- Lyon Peak
- Mac Canyon
- Mackay Mansion
- Martin Ridge
- McBride Flat
- McCall Creek
- McConnell Peak
- McCoy
- McCutcheon Creek
- McDonald Creek
- McDuffy Gulch
- McFarland Peak
- McGhee Mountain
- McGill
- McIntyre Summit
- McKinney Mountains
- McKissick Canyon
- McLeans
- McLeod
- McMaughn Canyon
- Milton Ranch
- Monroe Canyon
- Morey
- Mount Charleston
- Mount Duncan
- Mount Grant
- Mount Hope
- Mount Scott
- Mount Stirling
- Piper Peak
- Preston
- Ralston
- Ross Creek
- Royston Hills
- Scott Pass
- Stewart
- Thompson Creek
- Wallace Canyon

== New Hampshire ==
- Adams Point
- Albany
- Balloch
- Bannock Hill
- Belmont
- Blair
- Burns Hill
- Campbell Hill
- Carleton Hill
- Castle Hill
- Charlestown
- Churchill Brook
- Colburn Hill
- Cove Hill
- Crawford Pond
- Crawford's Purchase Township
- Crown Hill
- Cummings Mountain
- Cunningham Hill
- Dalton
- Dunbar Hill
- Dunbarton
- Duncan Lake
- Dundee
- East Kingston
- Ferguson Brook
- Forbes Mountain
- Fulton Pond
- Garfield Hill
- Gilmore State Forest
- Glen
- Glencliff
- Glendale
- Gordon Hill
- Grant Hill
- Green Hill
- Green's Grant Township
- Greenfield
- Highlands
- Hillside Brook
- Howe Park
- Iona Lake
- Kelton Crag
- Kennedy Hill
- Kingston
- Lewis Hill
- Littleton
- Loch Lyndon
- Lochmere
- Lochehaven
- Lynn
- MacDowell County
- McClelland
- McCoy Mountain
- McGregors Pond
- McIntosh College
- Melrose Corner
- Middleton
- Milton
- Monroe
- Montgomery Brook
- Morningside Park
- Morrison Hill
- Murray Park
- North Charlestown
- Park Hill
- Preston Brook
- Red Hill
- Scotland
- Scotland Brook
- Scott
- Scott Bog
- Scott Brook
- Scott Mountain
- South Charlestown
- Stewart Hill
- Stewartstown
- Thistle Brook
- West Stewartstown

== New Jersey ==
- Aberdeen Township
- Adams
- Albion
- Anderson
- Annandale
- Avon Park
- Bishops Wood
- Blackwood
- Braeburn Heights
- Bridgeton
- Bridgewater
- Brookfield
- Campbells Corners
- Carlton Hill
- Chapel Hill
- Charleston
- Charleston East
- Charlestown
- Chester
- Clifton
- Clyde
- Dunbarton
- Dundee Canal
- Dunellen
- East Rutherford
- Edinburg
- Edinburg Park
- Fairfield
- Fenwick
- Flemington
- Galloway Township
- Gillespie
- Glen Cove
- Glen Ridge
- Glen Rock
- Glendale
- Glenmoore
- Glenside
- Gordons Corner
- Green Hill
- Grenloch
- Hamilton
- Hamilton Park
- Hamilton Township (two places)
- Harris Harbor
- Highland Park
- Highlands
- Hillside
- Hope
- Iona
- Kanouse Mountain
- Kennedys
- Kerrs Corners
- Kingston
- Kirkwood
- Lake Rutherford
- Lewis Point
- Linwood
- Livingston
- Loch Arbour
- Lockwood
- Low Moor
- Lyons
- MacArthur Manor
- Mansfield
- Martins
- McAfee
- McCrea Mills
- McDonald
- McKee City
- McPherson
- Melrose
- Milltown
- Monroe
- Muirhead
- New Albany
- New Gretna
- Newport
- Newstead
- Newton
- Newtown
- Northfield
- Oakwood Park
- Ormond
- Paisley
- Perth Amboy (only half Scottish; the other half was originally the Lenape word "Ompoge", which meant "elbow", "point", or "bowl")
- Pipers Corner
- Port Murray
- Port Warren
- Raven Rock
- Riverside
- Ross Corner
- Roxburg
- Rutherford
- Scotch Bonnet
- Scotch Plains
- Scotland Run
- Scotts Corners
- Scotts Mountain
- Silverton
- Springside
- Stanhope
- Sterling Hill
- Stirling
- Strathmore
- Tennent
- Wallace Mill
- Westfield
- Weston
- Westwood
- Whitehall
- Whitehouse
- Wick House

== New Mexico ==
- Blackrock
- Garfield
- Glenrio (from Scots "glen" + Spanish "rio" (meaning "river").)
- Glenwood
- Grant
- Hope
- Kingston
- Logan
- McIntosh
- McKinley
- Melrose
- Torrance

== New York ==
- Albany (ultimately from Alba, Gaelic for Scotland)
- Allendale
- Alloway
- Angus
- Arden
- Argyle
- Armstrong Corners
- Arrochar
- Avon
- Belmont
- Bolton
- Bonnie Crest
- Boswell Corners
- Braeside
- Brookfield
- Buchanan
- Burns
- Burnside
- Caledonia
- Camby
- Cameron
- Campbell
- Carnegie
- Ceres
- Chapel Corners
- Charleston
- Charlton
- Cheviot
- Clifton
- Clyde
- Covington
- Cowan Corner
- Craigs
- Crawford
- Cross Hill
- Cross Roads
- Cullen
- Dalton
- Dean
- Douglas Crossing
- Dunbar
- Dunbarton
- Dundee
- East Avon
- East Buskirk
- East Campbell
- East Hamilton
- East Hills
- East Pitcairn
- East Whitehall
- Edinburg
- Elgin
- Fairfield
- Fraser
- Fulton
- Furnace Village
- Gifford
- Glasgow Mills
- Glen
- Glenburnie
- Glencairn
- Glendale
- Glenmore
- Glenwood
- Glen Cove
- Glen Head
- Glen Spey
- Gordon Heights
- Gretna
- Greystone
- Hamilton
- Harris
- Hecla
- Henderson
- Hermitage
- Highland
- Highland Falls
- Highland Lake
- Highland Park
- Hillside
- Hope
- Hume
- Hunter
- Huntly Corners
- Inverness
- Jamestown
- Kilmartin Corners
- Kirk
- Kirkwood
- Lamberton
- Lamont
- Lewis
- Lewiston
- Linwood
- Lithgow
- Livingston
- Livingston County
- Loch Sheldrake
- Lockwood
- Logan
- Lyons
- MacDougall
- Marshall
- Martin
- Mayfield
- McClure
- McConnell Corners
- McDuffie Town
- McEwens Corner
- McIntyre
- McKinley
- McKinneys
- McKnight Corners
- McLean
- McMaster Corners
- McMillan Corners
- McPherson Point
- Melrose
- Millport
- Milltown
- Milton
- Monroe
- Montrose
- Morey Park
- Morton
- Murray
- Netherwood
- New Scotland
- North Argyle
- North Avon
- North Highland
- North Sterling
- Oakley Corners
- Oakwood
- Ormiston
- Perth
- Pitcairn
- Preston
- Riverside
- Rock Glen
- Rosebank
- Roslyn
- Ross Corners
- Rossburg
- Saltaire
- Scotch Bush
- Scotch Church
- Scotch Hill
- Scotchtown
- Scotia
- Scott
- Scotts Corners
- Scottsburg
- Scottsville
- Selkirk
- South Albany
- South Argyle
- South Avon
- South Cameron
- South Hamilton
- South Highland
- St. Andrew
- Stanley
- Star Corners
- Sterling
- Stewart Corners
- Stirling
- Stow
- Summerville
- Sunny Brae
- The Glen
- Thorn Hill
- Thornton
- Treadwell
- Waverly
- Wellwood
- West Albany
- West Cameron
- West Monroe
- West Mount Vernon
- West Perth
- Westfield
- Weston
- Westwood Corners
- Whitelaw
- Whiteside Corners
- Whitestone
- Wicks Corners
- Willow Glen
- Wilton

== North Carolina ==
- Aberdeen
- Clyde
- Cumnock
- Davidson
- Davidson County
- Dundarrach
- Forsyth County
- Glencoe
- Highlands
- Inverness
- McDonald
- McDowell County
- McFarlan
- Roxboro
- Rutherford
- Rutherfordton
- Scotland County
- Wallace

== North Dakota ==
- Abercrombie
- Ayr
- Balfour
- Bathgate
- Buchanan
- Elgin
- Elliot
- Glen Ullin
- Grant County
- Hamilton
- Leith
- Logan County
- McIntosh County
- McKenzie County
- McLean County
- Morton County
- Perth
- Perth Township

== Ohio ==
- Aberdeen
- Albany
- Alexandria
- Anderson
- Angus
- Arlington
- Armadale
- Armstrong
- Ashton
- Avon
- Bannock
- Barclay
- Barnhill
- Barrick
- Belmont
- Bernice
- Blacktop
- Broughton
- Buchanan
- Caldwell
- Caledonia
- Cameron
- Campbell
- Campbellstown
- Carrington
- Chapel Hill
- Charlestown
- Cheviot
- Churchill
- Clayton
- Clifton
- Clyde
- Coulter
- Cove
- Covington
- Craigton
- Crawford
- Crown City
- Cunningham
- Dalton
- Dipple
- Douglas
- Dunbar
- Duncanwood
- Dundee
- East Clayton
- East Mansfield
- East Monroe
- Edinburg
- Elgin
- Fincastle
- Flushing
- Fort McKinley
- Fulton County
- Galloway
- Garfield
- Georgetown
- Gilmore
- Glasgow
- Glen Roy
- Glenbyrne Center
- Glencoe
- Glendale
- Glenmoor
- Gordon
- Greenfield
- Gretna
- Hamilton
- Harris
- Hartwell
- Hatton
- Hazelton Corners
- Hecla
- Hepburn
- Highland
- Highland County
- Highland Park
- Highlandtown
- Hope
- Houston
- Hunter
- Jamestown
- Keith
- Kerr
- Kingston
- Kirkwood
- Knollwood Village
- Leith
- Linwood
- Lock Port
- Lockwood Corners
- Logan
- Lynn
- Lyons
- Mansfield
- Maud
- Mayfield
- McArthur
- McClure
- McComb
- McConnelsville
- McCracken Corners
- McCuneville
- McCutchenville
- McDaniel Crossroad
- McDonald
- McFarlands Corners
- McGaw
- McGill
- McGuffey
- McIntyre
- McKay
- McKays Corners
- McKendree
- McLeish
- McMorran
- Melrose
- Middleton
- Middleton Corner
- Millport
- Milton Center
- Monroe
- Montrose
- Mount Hope
- Mount Sterling
- Munroe Falls
- Murray City
- New Albany
- Newburgh Heights
- Newkirk
- Newton Falls
- Oakley
- Peebles
- Port William
- Red Lion
- Ross
- Ross County
- Ross Township (four places)
- Rossburg
- Scotch Ridge
- Scotland
- Scott
- Scott Corners
- Scotts Crossing
- Scott Township (four places)
- Scottown
- South Charleston
- Stanhope
- Stanley
- Starr
- Sterling
- Stewart
- Struthers
- Thompson
- Upland Heights
- Waverly
- Weems
- West Alexandria
- West Charleston
- West Chester
- West Covington
- West Hill
- West Mansfield
- West Milton
- West Newton
- Westfield
- Westhill Heights
- Westhope
- Weston
- Westwood
- Whitehall
- Whitehouse
- Wick
- Winfield

== Oklahoma ==
- Carnegie
- Chisholm Trail
- Davidson
- Douglas
- Duncan
- Hunter
- Lamont
- Logan County
- Macomb
- McAlester
- McClain County
- McCurtain County
- McIntosh County
- McLoud
- Midlothian, Oklahoma
- Morris
- Morrison
- Stuart

== Oregon ==
- Albany
- Burns
- Douglas County
- Dundee
- Glasgow
- Paisley

== Pennsylvania ==
- Abbott Township
- Addison
- Alba
- Albany
- Alexandria
- Armstrong County
- Ashley
- Austin
- Avon
- Ayr Township
- Bart Township, Pennsylvania
- Bell Township
- Belmont
- Berwick
- Black Township
- Blackrock
- Blair County
- Bloomfield
- Boswell
- Brighton Township
- Broadford
- Brown Township
- Bruceton
- Burnside
- Campbelltown
- Carnegie
- Corry
- Coulter
- Cowan
- Crawford County
- Dallas
- Dalton
- Dawson
- Dean
- Dormont
- Drums
- Dunbar
- Duncan Township
- Duncansville
- Dunmore
- Dysart
- East Cameron Township
- Edinboro
- Elgin
- Ferguson Township
- Flemington
- Ford City
- Frazer Township, Allegheny County
- Fulton County
- Georgetown
- Gibson Township
- Gifford
- Glasgow
- Glen Campbell
- Glen Hope
- Glen Lyon
- Glenside
- Glenwood
- Gordon
- Graham Township
- Grampian
- Hamilton Township
- Hawthorne
- Highland Park
- Highland Township
- Hilltown
- Houston
- Howard
- Jamestown
- Kingston
- Kirkwood
- Knox (formerly Edenburg)
- Lanark
- Lansdale
- Lawrence County
- Lewis Run
- Lewis Township
- Linwood
- Lock Haven
- Lower Paxton Township
- Manor
- Mansfield
- Marienville (formerly spelled Marionville)
- Mayfield
- McAlisterville
- McCalmont Township
- McClure (Two Counties)
- McConnellsburg
- McConnellstown
- McDonald
- McHenry Township
- McIntyre Township
- McKean County
- McKees Rocks
- McKeesport
- McMurray
- McVeytown
- Mercer
- Milroy
- Monroe County
- Montgomery
- Montrose
- Morris
- Morton
- Moscow
- Nelson Township
- New Albany
- Newton Hamilton
- Newtown
- Nixon
- North Abington Township
- North Middleton Township
- Oakwood
- Oliver
- Olyphant
- Patterson Township
- Patton
- Pen Argyl
- Pitcairn
- Radnor
- Red Hill
- Red Lion
- Redstone
- Renfrew
- Robinson Township
- Ross Township
- Roxborough
- Russell
- Rutherford
- Rye Township
- Scotch Hill
- Scotia
- Scotland
- Scott Township
- Scottdale
- Simpson
- Slateford
- Smithton
- South Abington Township
- South Newton Township
- Spring Garden
- Spring Hill
- Summerhill
- Summerville
- Thompson
- Upland
- Upper Paxton Township
- West Abington Township
- West Cameron Township
- Wilson
- Wood Township
- Young Township

== Rhode Island ==
- Blackrock
- Charlestown
- Glendale
- Jamestown
- Kingston
- Middletown
- Riverside

== South Carolina ==
- Anderson
- Cameron
- Dunbarton (Dumbarton)
- Elgin, Kershaw County
- Elgin, Lancaster County
- McBee
- McClellanville
- McColl
- McConnells
- McCormick
- McCormick County
- Pickens
- Pickens County
- Scotia

== South Dakota ==
- Aberdeen
- Alexandria
- Arlington
- Avon
- Brown County
- Campbell County
- Dallas
- Douglas County
- Eden
- Fulton
- Geddes
- Grant County
- Gretna
- Hecla
- Kyle
- Lennox
- Mansfield
- Marshall County
- Martin
- McCook County
- McIntosh
- McPherson County
- Milltown
- Monroe
- Montrose
- Mount Vernon
- Pollock
- Roslyn
- Scotland
- Stanley County
- Wallace
- Waverly, Codington County

== Tennessee ==
- Adams
- Arlington
- Baxter
- Big Sandy
- Blair
- Burns
- Calderwood
- Campbell County
- Campbells Station
- Charleston
- Church Hill
- Claiborne County
- Clifton
- Cowan
- Crawford
- Crossroads
- Davidson County
- Dunlap
- Erwin
- Fulton
- Gibson
- Green Hill
- Greenfield
- Halls
- Houston
- Houston County
- Hunter
- Jamestown
- Kelso
- Kingston
- Knoxville
- Livingston
- Martin
- McEwen
- McKenzie
- McMinn County
- Polk County
- Rutherford
- Scott County
- South Fulton
- Spring Hill
- Thorn Hill
- Waverly
- Whiteside
- Winfield

== Texas ==
- Abernathy
- Albany
- Argyle
- Armstrong
- Bowie
- Camden
- Cameron
- Crawford
- Cumings
- Dallas
- Damon
- Douglas
- Edinburg
- Elgin
- Glenn Heights
- Gordon
- Graham
- Highlands
- Houston
- Kyle
- Lake Dallas
- Lanark
- Livingston
- McAllen
- McGirk
- McGregor
- McKinney
- McLennan County
- McLeod
- McNeil
- Midlothian, Ellis County
- Millican
- Montrose
- Ochiltree
- Archer County
- Scottsville

== Utah ==
- Alton
- Alta
- Altamont
- Ballard
- Blanding
- Bryce
- Bryce Canyon
- Elsinore
- Glendale
- Highland
- Ivins
- Logan
- Nibley
- North Logan
- Oakley
- Ogden - named after Scottish trapper Peter Skene Ogden
- Sterling
- Torrey

== Vermont ==
- Albany
- Arlington
- Caledonia County
- Castleton
- Charleston
- Clyde River

== Virginia ==
- Airlie
- Alanton
- Alexandria
- Annandale
- Armstrong
- Avon
- Battlefield Park
- Belmont
- Blackford
- Blackridge
- Bonny Blue
- Caledonia
- Calvin
- Campbell
- Camptown
- Celt
- Ceres
- Chester
- Church Hill
- Clifton
- Covington
- Cowie Corner
- Crawfords Store
- Cullen
- Cunningham
- Daltons
- Deans
- Douglas Park
- Drummonds Corner
- Dry Bridge
- Dryburg
- Dumbarton
- Dumfries
- Dunbar
- Duncan
- Dundas
- Dundee
- Dunlap Beach
- Dunlop
- Dye
- East Highland Park
- Edinburg
- Elgin Corner
- Ettrick
- Fife
- Fincastle
- Ford
- Furnace
- Georgetown
- Gillespie
- Gilmerton
- Glasgow
- Glenbrook Hills
- Glendale
- Glenmore
- Glenwood Park
- Grant
- Gretna
- Hamilton
- Hartwood
- Highland
- Highland Park
- Hunters
- Huntly
- James City County
- James River
- Jamestown, Virginia (for King James, formerly James VI of Scots)
- Keen Mountain
- Keith
- Kelso Mill
- Kilmarnock
- Kilmarnock Wharf
- Kings Crossing
- Kingston
- Leithtown
- Leslie
- Lime Hill
- Littleton
- Logan
- Lyons
- Maidens
- Marionville
- Maryton
- Maxie
- Mayfield
- McAdam
- McCall Gap
- McClure
- McConnell
- McCoy
- McCready
- McDonalds Mill
- McDowell
- McDuff
- McHenry
- McIvor
- McKinley
- McKnights Mill
- McLean
- McLean Hamlet
- McMullen
- McNeals Corner
- McRae
- Melrose
- Middletons Corner
- Midlothian
- Monroe
- Montrose Heights
- Morningside Hills
- Moscow
- Mount Vernon
- Mt. Crawford
- Murrayfield
- New Glasgow
- Newington
- Orkney Springs
- Patna
- Perth
- Pipers Gap
- Preston
- Reston
- Riverdale
- Roslyn Hills
- Rosslyn
- Rumford
- Ruther Glen
- Scotchtown
- Scotland
- Scott Addition
- Scott County
- Scotts Corner
- Scotts Crossroad
- Scottsburg
- Scottswood
- Sinclair Farms
- Stanley
- Sterling
- Stewarts Landing
- Sutherland
- Wallace
- Waverly
- Weems
- White Hill

== Washington ==
- Aberdeen
- Blaine
- Cunningham
- Douglas
- Elgin
- Fife
- Finley
- Graham
- Kelso
- Lake McMurray
- McMillan
- McNeil Island
- Monroe

== West Virginia ==
- Aberdeen
- Glasgow
- Glenville
- McDowell County
- Montrose

== Wisconsin ==
- Albany
- Allenton
- Anderson (two places)
- Angus
- Argyle
- Arlington
- Armstrong
- Armstrong Creek
- Ashley
- Ashton
- Avon
- Beechwood
- Bell
- Belmont
- Blaine
- Blair
- Bruce
- Burnett County
- Burns
- Burnside
- Caldwell
- Caledonia (four places)
- Cameron
- Campbell
- Camp Douglas
- Carnegie
- Castle Rock
- Chester(s)
- Clayton
- Clifton
- Clyde
- Colburn
- Crawford County
- Cullen
- Dallas
- Dalton
- Douglas
- Douglas County
- Drummond
- Dunbar
- Dunn (two places)
- Dunn County
- Dunbarton
- Dundee
- Elcho (Earl of Wemyss and March)
- Ettrick
- Fairburn
- Fort McCoy
- Fulton
- Galloway
- Glen Haven
- Glencoe
- Glendale
- Glenmore
- Glenwood
- Gordon (three places)
- Grant (six places)
- Grantsburg
- Greenbush
- Greenfield
- Greenwood
- Guthrie
- Hamilton
- Harris
- Hayton
- Highland
- Highland Park
- Hunter
- Irvine
- Keene
- Kelly
- Kingston
- Lamont
- Lanark
- Lennox
- Leslie
- Lewis
- Lewiston
- Linton
- Linwood
- Livingston
- Longwood
- Lynn
- Lyons
- MacIntire Creek
- Marshall
- Mayfield
- McAllister
- McDonald Creek
- McFarland
- McKays Spur
- McKenzie Creek
- McKinley (two places)
- McMillan
- Melrose
- Middleton
- Milltown
- Milton
- Monroe
- Montrose
- Morton Corner
- Mount Sterling
- Mount Vernon
- Murry
- Norrie
- North Clayton
- Oakley
- Oakwood
- Reid
- Ross
- Scott (seven places)
- Scott Junction
- Springfield
- Stanley
- Sterling
- Sutherland
- Thornton
- Union Grove
- Waverly
- Westfield
- Weston
- Woodlawn

== Wyoming ==
- Burns
- Campbell County
- Douglas
- McKinnon

== See also ==
- List of Scottish place names in Canada
- List of Scottish place names in other countries
- Scottish place names in Australia
- Scottish place names in New Zealand
- List of non-US places that have a US place named after them

== Sources ==
- Phillips, James W., Washington State Place Names, (Seattle, 1971)
- The Surnames of Scotland - George F. Black
