= Virginia State Route 30 =

State highway in eastern Virginia, US

State Route 30

Route information
- Maintained by VDOT
- Length: 61.87 mi (99.57 km)

Major junctions
- West end: US 1 in Doswell
- I-95 in Doswell; US 301 / SR 2 in Dawn; US 360 in Central Garage; SR 33 in West Point; SR 33 / SR 249 near Eltham; US 60 near Toano
- South end: I-64 / SR 607 / SR 755 near Norge

Location
- Country: United States
- State: Virginia
- Counties: Hanover, Caroline, King William, New Kent, James City

Highway system
- Virginia Routes; Interstate; US; Primary; Secondary; Byways; History; HOT lanes
← US 29	→ SR 31

State Route 30 (SR 30) is a primary state highway in the U.S. state of Virginia. The state highway runs 61.87 miles (99.57 km) from U.S. Route 1 (US 1) in Doswell east to Interstate 64 (I-64) and SR 607 near Norge. SR 30 runs east–west through Hanover and Caroline Counties, connecting US 1 and I-95 with the Kings Dominion amusement park and US 301. The state highway serves as the principal highway of King William County, connecting U.S. Route 360 with SR 33 in West Point via the county's namesake county seat. SR 30 also connects SR 33 and US 60 in New Kent and James City Counties.

== Route description ==
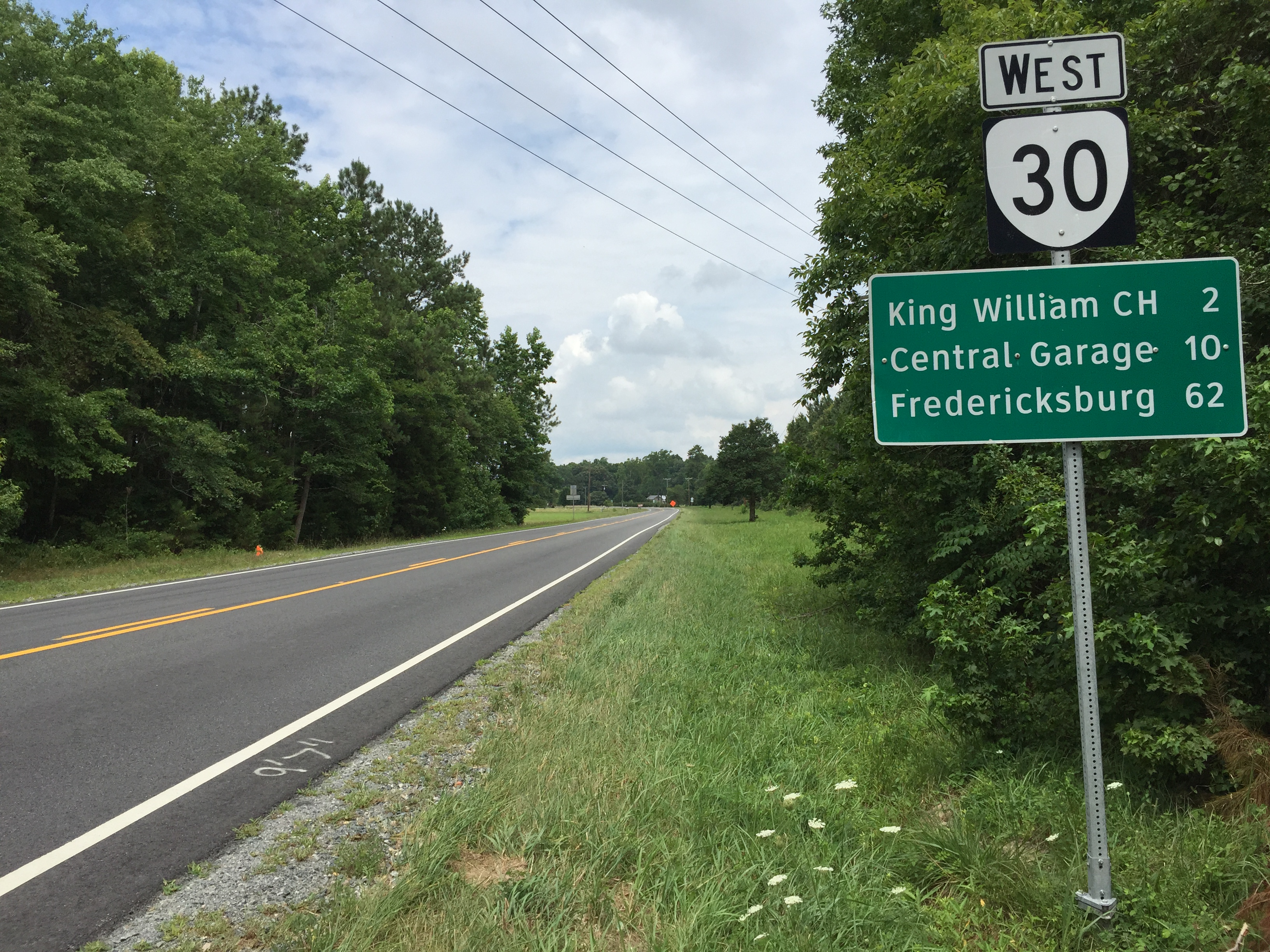
View west along SR 30 near SR 620 in King William County

SR 30 begins at an intersection with US 1 (Washington Highway) south of Doswell in northeastern Hanover County. The state highway heads east as Kings Dominion Boulevard, a two-lane undivided road that heads east and crosses over CSX's RF&P Subdivision on a very wide bridge. Just east of the railroad crossing, SR 30 meets I-95 at a partial cloverleaf interchange Immediately to the east of the railroad crossing, SR 30 intersects SR 725 (Binns Road), which leads to the ramp from southbound I-95 to the Kings Dominion amusement park. SR 30 continues east to its interchange with I-95, which includes direct ramps between southbound I-95 and the entrance to Kings Dominion. Access to the ramp from SR 30 is provided indirectly from SR 725 (Binns Road) between the railroad crossing and the interchange. At I-95, SR 30 expands to a four-lane divided highway. East of I-95, SR 30 passes between a truck stop and the parking lot of Kings Dominion, which is accessed by either Theme Park Way or the direct entrance immediately to the east. SR 30 crosses CSX's Piedmont Subdivision at grade before crossing the North Anna River into Caroline County. Just east of the river, the state highway, now known as Dawn Boulevard, passes through the hamlet of Hart Corner, which contains Meadow Event Park, the home of the Virginia State Fair starting in 2009. East of the event park, SR 30 reduces to a two-lane undivided highway and continues east to Bowersville, also known as Dawn, where the highway intersects US 301 and SR 2 (Richmond Turnpike).

SR 30 continues east into King William County, where the highway is named King William Road. The state highway passes through the hamlets of Calno, Mangohick (the site of Mangohick Church), Epworth, Pollards Corner, and Turpin before reaching its intersection with US 360 (Richmond Tappahannock Highway) in the village of Central Garage. SR 30 continues southeast through Rumford to the unincorporated county seat of King William. The King William County Courthouse, which was constructed in 1725, is the oldest continually used courthouse building in the United States. The state highway continues southeast through the hamlet of Romancoke to the town of West Point, which is located at the southeastern end of King William County where the Pamukey and Mattaponi Rivers merge to form the York River. SR 30 turns west onto four-lane 14th Street to join SR 33 in a concurrency. The two state highways cross the Eltham Bridge over the Pamunkey River into New Kent County.

SR 30 and SR 33 head west as four-lane Eltham Road through the village of Eltham, where the highway meets the northern terminus of SR 273 (Farmers Drive), which was formerly part of SR 30. West of the village, the two highways widen to a divided highway west 4 miles (6.4 km) until the concurrency ends at New Kent Highway, which heads west as SR 249 and southeast as SR 30. SR 30 meets the southern end of SR 273 (Farmers Drive) in Barhamsville, then enters James City County. A short distance south of the county line, the state highway, now named Old Stage Road, expands to a four-lane divided highway and meets I-64 at a partial cloverleaf interchange. SR 30 continues south as Barhamsville Road to its intersection with US 60 (Richmond Highway) north of Toano. SR 30 is marked to the north and east legs of the intersection and US 60 is assigned to the south and west legs of the intersection, meaning staying on the same highway requires making a turn. SR 30 heads east as Rochambeau Drive, which is a four-lane divided highway until reducing to two lanes shortly before reaching an intersection with SR 607 (Croaker Road) and SR 755 (Rochambeau Drive) north of Norge. SR 30 turns north onto Croaker Road, a four-lane divided highway, and passes through a full cloverleaf interchange with I-64. SR 30's eastern terminus is at the northern edge of the interchange; Croaker Road continues north as SR 607 toward Croaker.

== Major intersections ==
County	Location	mi	km	Destinations	Notes
Hanover	Doswell	0.00	0.00	US 1 (Washington Highway) – Ashland, Doswell, Scotchtown Home of Patrick Henry	Western terminus
Hanover	Doswell	0.61	0.98	I-95 – Washington, Richmond	Exit 98 (I-95)
Caroline	Dawn	5.67	9.12	US 301 / SR 2 (Richmond Turnpike) to I-95 – Bowling Green, Richmond	
King William	Central Garage	20.97	33.75	US 360 (Richmond Tappahannock Highway) – Tappahannock, Richmond	
King William	Whites Shop			SR 633 (Powhatan Trail) – Lanesville	former SR 293 south
King William	West Point			SR 701 (West Euclid Boulevard)	former SR 124 west
King William	West Point	45.51	73.24	SR 33 east (14th Street) / SR 1129 (Main Street) – Middle Peninsula Regional Airport	Western end of SR 33 concurrency
King William	West Point			Kirby Street (SR 296)	Northern terminus of SR 296
Pamunkey River				Eltham Bridge	
New Kent	Eltham			SR 273 south (Farmers Drive) – Barhamsville	Northern terminus of SR 273
New Kent	Angelview Church	50.41	81.13	SR 33 west (Eltham Road) / SR 249 west (New Kent Highway) to I-64 – Richmond, New Kent	Eastern end of SR 33 concurrency; eastern terminus of SR 249
New Kent	Barhamsville	53.84	86.65	SR 273 north (Farmers Drive)	Southern terminus of SR 273
James City		56.75	91.33	I-64 – Norfolk, Richmond	Exit 227 (I-64)
James City		58.46	94.08	US 60 (Richmond Road) – Toano, Williamsburg	
James City	Norge			SR 607 (Croaker Road) / SR 755 (Rochambeau Drive)	Eastern terminus; former SR 188 south
1.000 mi = 1.609 km; 1.000 km = 0.621 mi: Concurrency terminus

< SR 29	Two‑digit State Routes; 1923-1933	SR 31 >
< SR 52	Two‑digit State Routes; 1923-1933	SR 54 >
