= Epworth =

Epworth originally referred to Epworth, Lincolnshire, a town in England that was the birthplace of John Wesley and Charles Wesley, early leaders of the Methodist religious movement. The town's name has since been used for other places and institutions affiliated with the Methodist denomination of Christianity.

In addition to the English town, Epworth may refer to:

== Places ==
=== Canada ===
- Epworth, Newfoundland and Labrador, a hamlet, Burin Peninsula, Newfoundland
- Epworth Park, a neighborhood in Grand Bay-Westfield, New Brunswick

=== United States ===
- Epworth, Georgia, an unincorporated community
- Epworth by the Sea, Georgia, a Methodist retreat center
- Epworth, Illinois, a town
- Epworth, Iowa, a town near Dubuque
- Epworth, Missouri, an unincorporated community
- Epworth Heights, Michigan, a summer resort in Ludington, Michigan
- Epworth, Virginia, an unincorporated community

=== Zimbabwe ===
- Epworth, Zimbabwe, a city and suburb of Harare
  - Epworth (constituency), a constituency of the Zimbabwean parliament

== Buildings ==
- Epworth Hall (disambiguation), several buildings
- Epworth Hospital in Melbourne, Australia
- Epworth Military Academy (1857–1928), a defunct military academy in Epworth, Iowa
- Epworth School, a private school in Scottsville, Pietermaritzburg, KwaZulu-Natal, South Africa
- Epworth School (Epworth, Iowa) (1917–2011), a Colonial Revival/Romanesque Revival building in Epworth, Iowa, United States

== Other uses ==
- Epworth League, a youth organization of the American Methodist Episcopal church
- Epworth sleepiness scale, used in the diagnosis of sleep apnea
- Friar Lane & Epworth F.C., a football (soccer) club, Aylestone, Leicestershire, England
- Epworth a tune written by Charles Wesley 1757-1834 to the hymn 'Forgive our sins as we forgive' (New English Hymnal 66); Epworth, Lincolnshire being his birthplace.
