= Marionville =

Marionville can refer to:

- Marionville, Missouri
- Marionville, Virginia
- Marionville, Ontario
