= Samuel Osborne =

Samuel or Sam Osborne or Osborn may refer to:

- Samuel Osborne (custodian) (1833–1903), African American custodian and caretaker at Colby College
- Samuel W. Osborne (1868–1952), Australian newspaper founder and editor
- Sam Osborne (footballer) (born 1999), English footballer
- Sam Osborne (racing driver) (born 1993), British racing driver
- Samuel Osborn (surgeon) (1848–1936), British surgeon
- Samuel Osborn & Company, a steelmaker and engineering tool manufacturer in Sheffield, South Yorkshire

== See also ==
- Samuel Osborne-Gibbes (1803–1874), British Army officer, plantation owner and politician
- Samuel Osborne Habershon (1825–1889), English physician
