= Virginia State Route 273 =

State highway in New Kent County, Virginia, US

State Route 273
- Farmers Drive

Route information
- Maintained by VDOT
- Length: 5.33 mi (8.58 km)
- Existed: mid-1980s–present

Major junctions
- South end: SR 30 in Barhamsville
- North end: SR 30 / SR 33 at Eltham

Location
- Country: United States
- State: Virginia
- Counties: New Kent

Highway system
- Virginia Routes; Interstate; US; Primary; Secondary; Byways; History; HOT lanes
← SR 272	→ SR 274

State Route 273 (SR 273) is a primary state highway in the U.S. state of Virginia. Known as Farmers Drive, the state highway runs 5.33 miles (8.58 km) from SR 30 in Barhamsville north to SR 30 and SR 33 at Eltham. SR 273 is the old alignment of SR 30 in eastern New Kent County.

== Route description ==
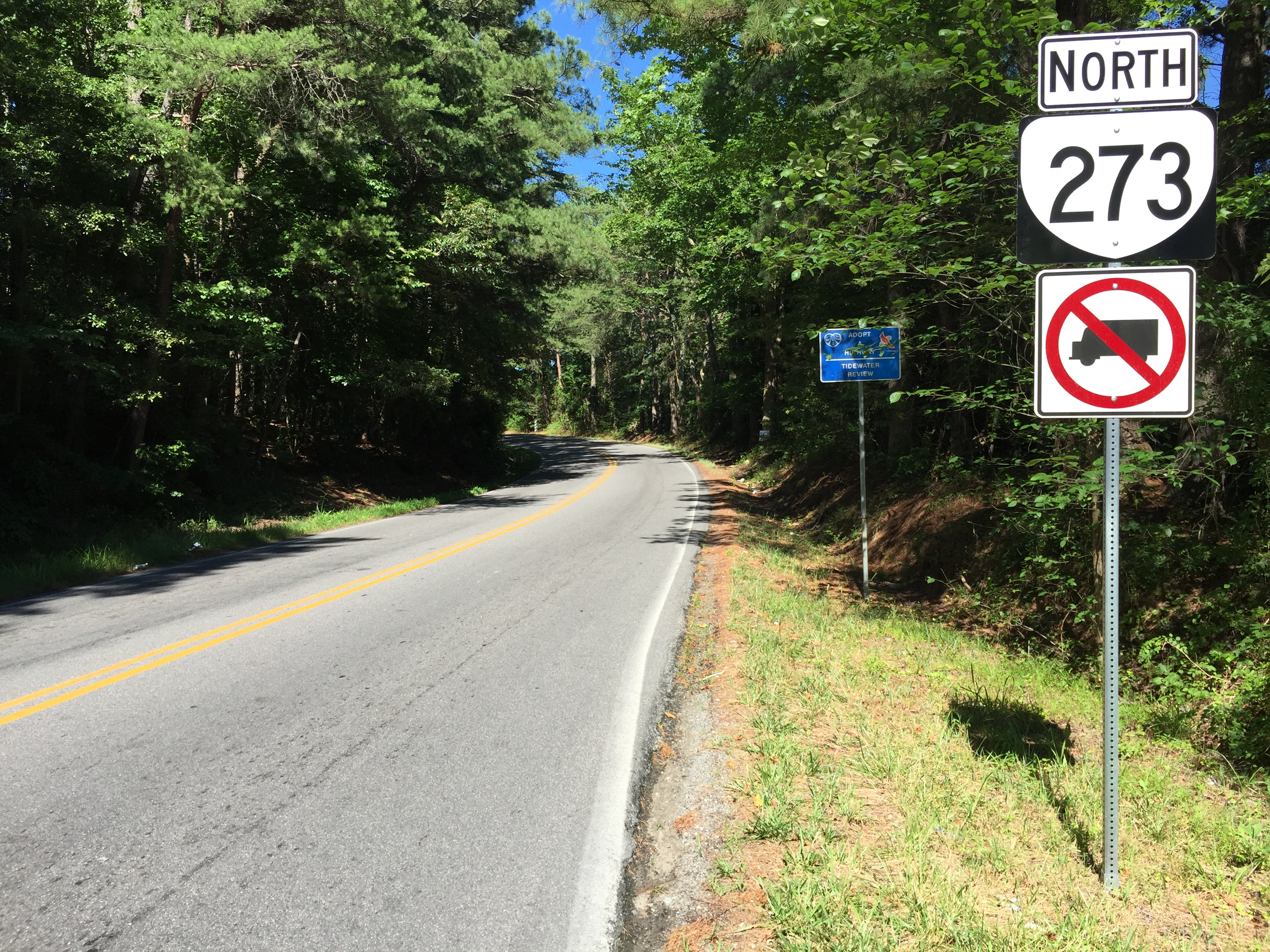
View north at the south end of SR 273 at SR 30 in Barhamsville

SR 273 begins at an intersection with SR 30 (New Kent Highway) in Barhamsville. The state highway heads northeast as a two-lane undivided road through a mix of farmland and forest. As it approaches the York River, SR 273 veers north and parallels the river. The state highway crosses Mill Creek before reaching its northern terminus at SR 30 and SR 33 (Eltham Road) in Eltham, a short distance west of the Pamunkey River, which forms the York River in confluence with the Mattaponi River at West Point.

== Major intersections ==
The entire route is in New Kent County.

Location	mi	km	Destinations	Notes
Barhamsville	0.00	0.00	SR 30 (New Kent Highway) – Barhamsville, Williamsburg, Norfolk	Southern terminus
Eltham	5.33	8.58	SR 30 / SR 33 (Eltham Road) – Richmond, West Point	Northern terminus
1.000 mi = 1.609 km; 1.000 km = 0.621 mi
