= Dawn, Virginia =

Unincorporated community in Virginia, United States

Coordinates: 37°50′07″N 77°21′47″W

- Unincorporated area
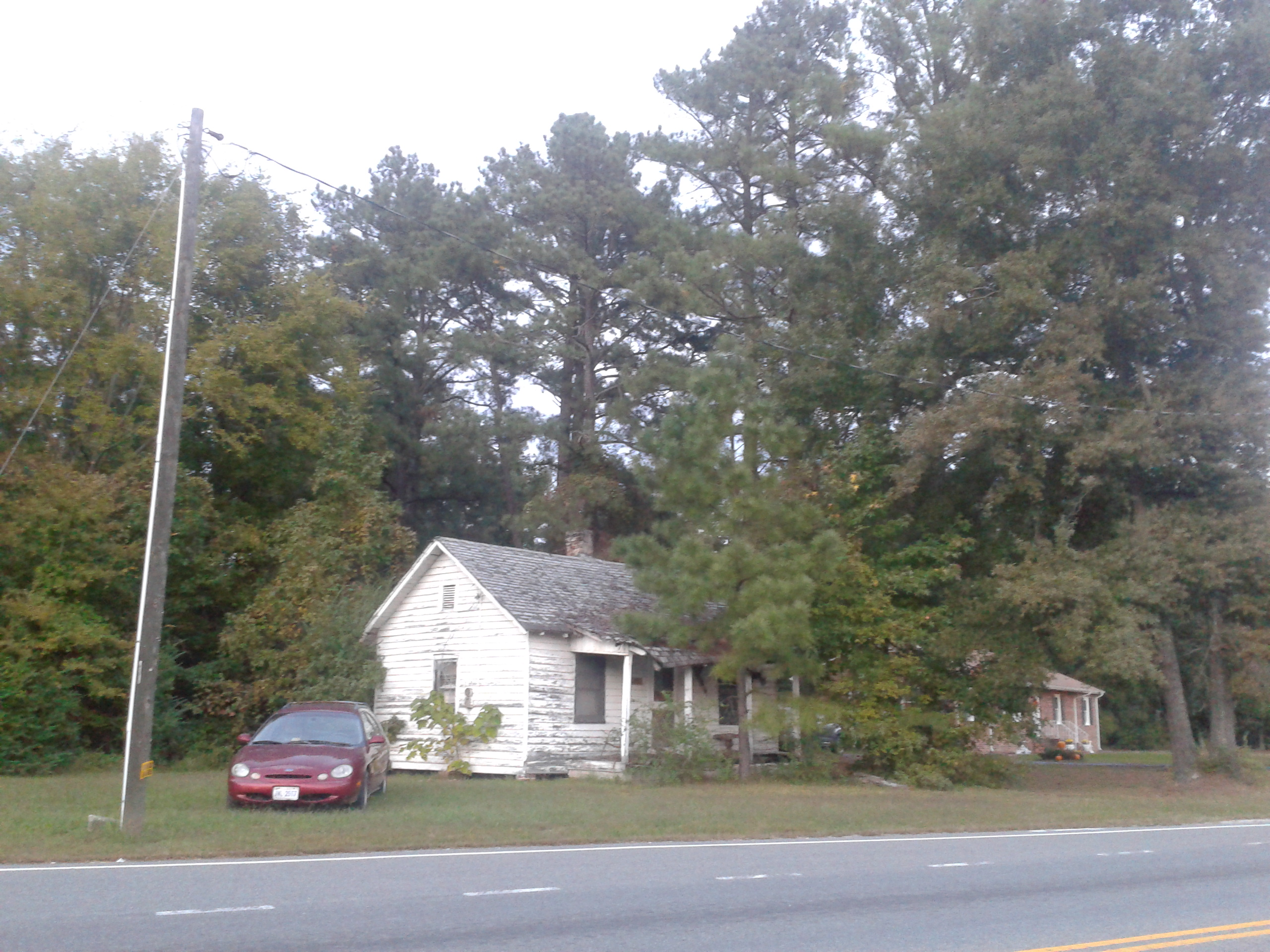
- Dawn at dusk, October, 2016
- Interactive map of Dawn, Virginia
- Country: United States
- State: Virginia
- County: Caroline County
- Time zone: UTC-5 (Eastern (EST))
  - Summer (DST): UTC-4 (EDT)
- ZIP codes: 23047, 23069
- Area code: 804

Dawn is an unincorporated community in Caroline County, in the U.S. state of Virginia. It is located at the intersection of US 301 / SR 2 (Richmond Turnpike) and SR 30 (Dawn Boulevard), roughly east of Doswell, north of Hanover, west of Central Garage, and south of Bowling Green.

== Attractions ==
Dawn has Dawn School, as well as Second Mt. Zion Baptist Church. Lou's Soul Food and Dawn Convenience Store are also located in the village.

== Major roads ==
SR 30 provides quick access to nearby Interstate 95, to Kings Dominion and Doswell.
US 301 / SR 2 provides access to Bowling Green and Richmond.
