= William County, Virginia =

William County, Virginia is an incorrect term for:

- Prince William County, Virginia
- King William County, Virginia
