= Virginia State Route 272 =

State highway in the City of Suffolk, Virginia, US

State Route 272
- South Quay Road

Route information
- Maintained by VDOT
- Length: 1.24 mi (2.00 km)
- Existed: c. 1990–present

Major junctions
- West end: SR 189 in Suffolk
- East end: US 58 / SR 189 in Suffolk

Location
- Country: United States
- State: Virginia
- Counties: City of Suffolk

Highway system
- Virginia Routes; Interstate; US; Primary; Secondary; Byways; History; HOT lanes
← SR 271	→ SR 273

State Route 272 (SR 272) is a primary state highway in the U.S. state of Virginia. Known as South Quay Road, the state highway runs 1.24 miles (2.00 km) from SR 189 east to U.S. Route 58 (US 58) and SR 189 within the independent city of Suffolk. SR 272 is a cut-off of old alignment of SR 189.

== Route description ==
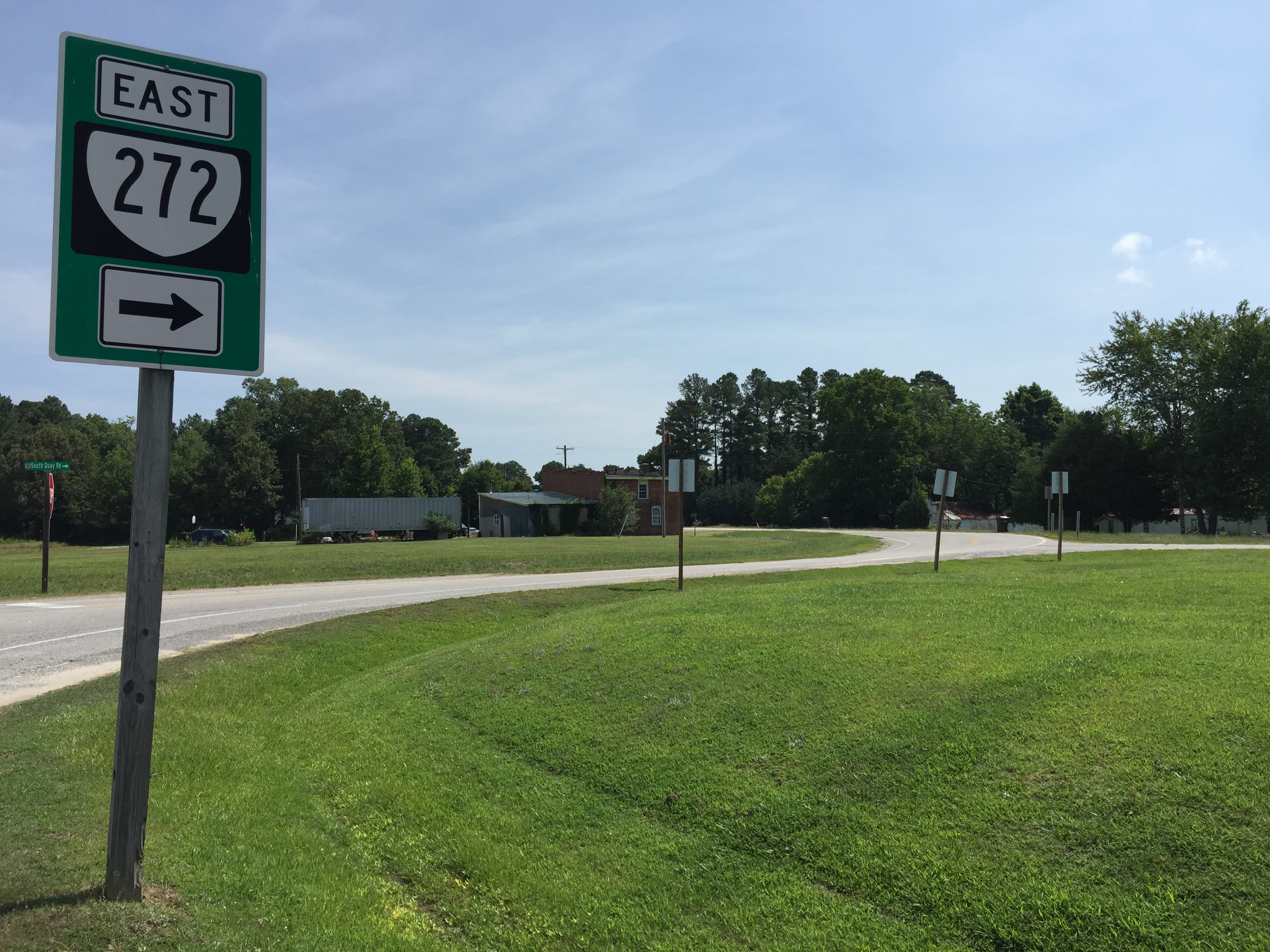
View east along SR 272 at SR 189 in Suffolk

SR 272 begins at SR 189 in a rural area of the city of Suffolk southeast of the city of Franklin. SR 189 heads southwest as South Quay Road and north as an unnamed highway toward Franklin. SR 272 heads northeast as a two-lane undivided road through a mix of farmland and forest to its eastern terminus at US 58 and SR 189, which run concurrently through much of Suffolk. The two highways head west as an unnamed highway toward Franklin and east as South Quay Road toward the center of Suffolk.

== Major intersections ==
The entire route is in Suffolk.

mi	km	Destinations	Notes
0.00	0.00	SR 189 (South Quay Road)	Western terminus
1.24	2.00	US 58 / SR 189 (South Quay Road) – Franklin	Eastern terminus
1.000 mi = 1.609 km; 1.000 km = 0.621 mi
