= King William County Public Schools =

School district in Virginia, United States

Coordinates: 37°41′41″N 77°02′6″W

Address
- 18548 King William Road King William, Virginia, 23086; United States

District information
- Type: Public
- Grades: Pre-K through 12
- Superintendent: Darrell Pankratz
- School board: 5 members
- Schools: 4
- NCES District ID: 5102120
- District ID: VA-050

Students and staff
- Students: 2,084 (2023)
- Teachers: 146 (2023)

Other information
- Website: www.kwcps.k12.va.us

King William County Public Schools is a school division that serves students in King William County, Virginia.

It includes all areas of King William County except for areas in the town limits of West Point.

== History ==
The first Superintendent of Schools in King William County was Mr. R.L. Williams, who was appointed to the post in September 1870 by Governor Gilbert Carlton Walker. The present King William High School building was erected in 1925. Previously, it was known as the Central High School and located at Sharon Church.

NFL running back Demond Claiborne graduated from King William County High School.

== Schools ==
There are four schools in King William County Public Schools.

Elementary schools

- Acquinton Elementary School
- Cool Spring Primary School

Secondary schools

- Hamilton-Holmes Middle School
- King William High School
