= Mangohick Church =

Historic church in Virginia, US

- U.S. National Register of Historic Places
- Virginia Landmarks Register
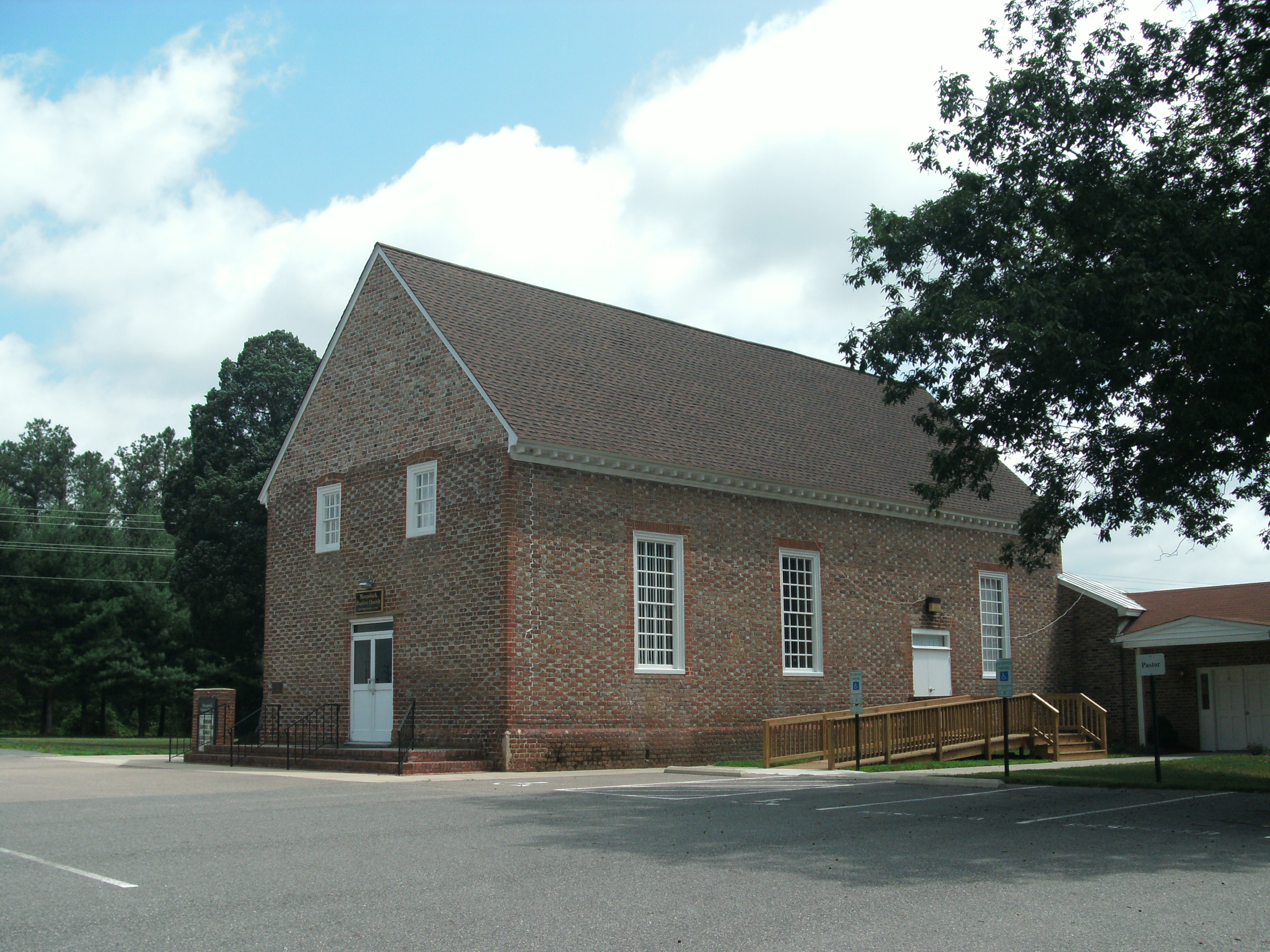
- Mangohick Church in May, 2010

- Location within Virginia Location within the United States
- Location: VA 638, S of VA 30, Mangohick, Virginia
- Coordinates: 37°48′28″N 77°16′21″W
- Area: 10 acres (4.0 ha)
- Built: 1730
- Architectural style: Colonial
- NRHP reference No.: 72001402
- VLR No.: 050-0041

Significant dates
- Added to NRHP: December 05, 1972
- Designated VLR: August 15, 1972

Mangohick Church, now also known as Mangohick Baptist Church, is a historic church located in the community of Mangohick, King William County, Virginia. One of two colonial-era churches still surviving in the current county, it was constructed in 1730 at the headwaters of Mangohick Creek, a tributary of the Pamunkey River. Mangohick became the Upper Church of St. David's when that parish was formed in 1774. It was listed on the National Register of Historic Places in 1972.

== History ==
During the western expansion of English settlement in Virginia, St. Margaret's Parish was established in 1720 to serve the upriver area between the Mattaponi and Pamunkey Rivers of then-vast King William County, thus splitting St. John's parish. Mangohick church was built circa 1730 as a chapel of ease for people living between the existing parishes, first located near the respective county courthouses. Bricks shipped from England were reportedly used to construct it. In 1742, the Virginia General Assembly limited St. Margaret's parish to Caroline County, and in 1744 established St. David's parish near the port of Aylett to serve the western area of King William county (whose boundaries ceased changing). Mangohick then became a chapel of east for St. David's parish. After Virginia's disestablishment of the Anglican Church (which had become the Episcopal Church following the Revolutionary War), Mangohick became a "free church", used by various denominations. Before the Civil War, the three colonial churches in Caroline County, as well as St. David's church fell into disrepair, and were replaced by clapboard wooden churches, with St. Margaret's Church at Ruther Glen, Virginia also eventually also becoming a Baptist congregation in modern times before returning to disuse.

During the Civil War, General Grant pitched his tent near the church, on May 27, 1864, as he maneuvered South and East of General Lee in the prelude to the Battle of Cold Harbor. The Union Baptist Church was formed at this location, and had both white and black members, but by 1920 the congregation was Black.

== Architecture ==
The one-story, rectangular brick building has a steep gable roof and measures 61 feet by 21 feet. The bricks were laid in English bond style below the water table, and Flemish bond style below the water table. The interior features a raised chancel and single pulpit. The tongue-and grove boards have been dated to the late 19th century, and the rear addition of church offices is modern.
