= Virginia State Route 189 =

State highway in southeastern Virginia, US

State Route 189

Route information
- Maintained by VDOT
- Length: 10.82 mi (17.41 km)
- Existed: 1933–present

Major junctions
- South end: US 258 near Franklin
- SR 272 in Suffolk; US 58 / US 258 in Suffolk
- North end: US 58 Bus. in Suffolk

Location
- Country: United States
- State: Virginia
- Counties: Southampton, City of Suffolk

Highway system
- Virginia Routes; Interstate; US; Primary; Secondary; Byways; History; HOT lanes
← SR 188	→ SR 190

State Route 189 (SR 189) is a primary state highway in the U.S. state of Virginia. Known for much of its length as South Quay Road, the state highway runs 10.82 miles (17.41 km) from U.S. Route 258 (US 258) near Franklin east to US 58 Business in Suffolk.

== Route description ==
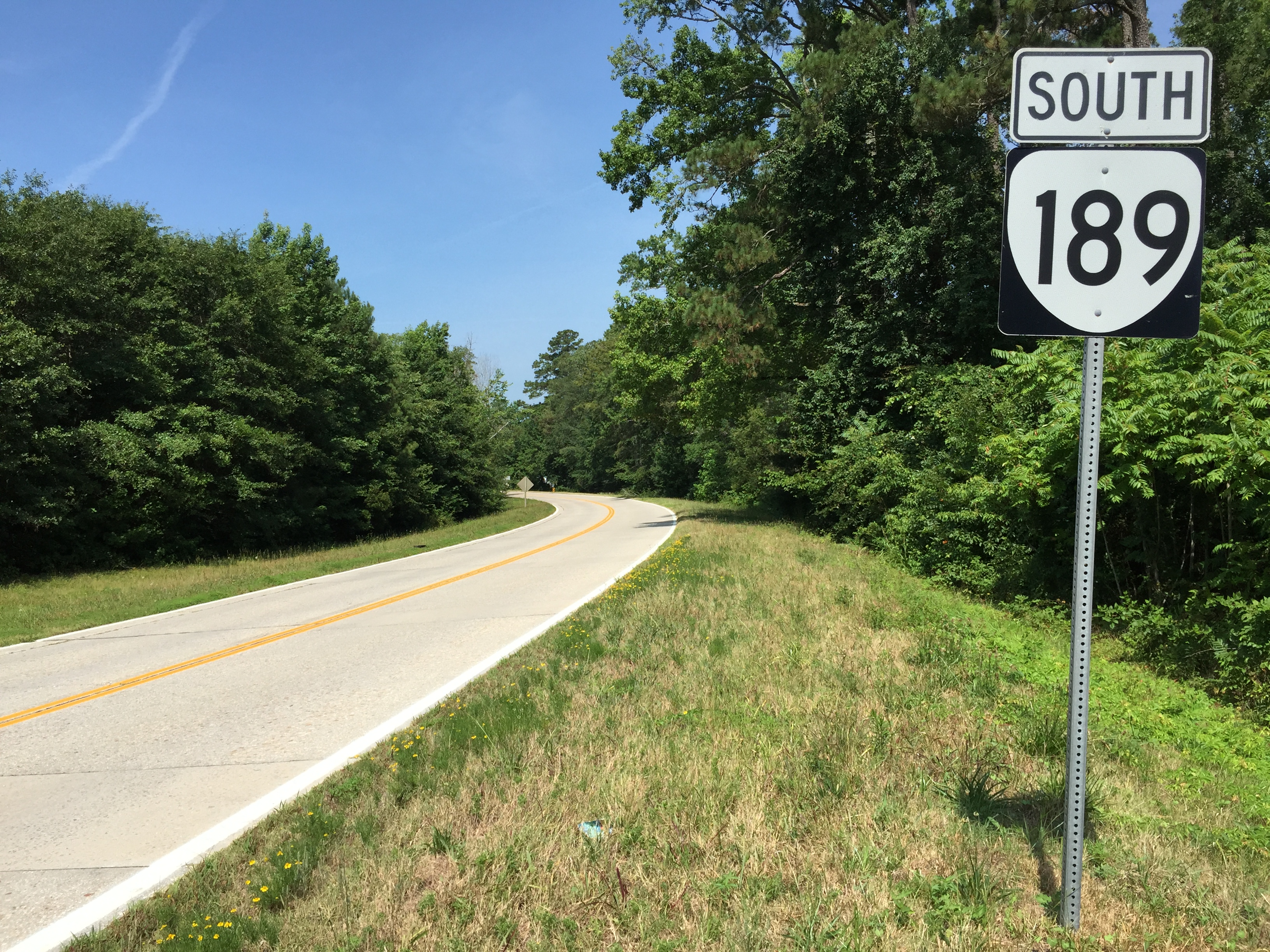
View south along SR 189 at SR 714 in Kingsdale

SR 189 begins at an intersection with US 258 (Smiths Ferry Road) in Southampton County south of the city of Franklin. The state highway heads northeast as two-lane undivided South Quay Road, which passes close to a bend in the Blackwater River before curving east to cross the river into the independent city of Suffolk. The state highway curves north and meets the western end of SR 272, onto which the South Quay Road name continues while SR 189 heads north as an unnamed road. SR 189 meets US 58 and US 258 (Franklin Bypass) at a partial cloverleaf interchange. The roadway continues north as US 258 toward Franklin while SR 189 runs concurrently with US 58 east on the four-lane divided highway. The two highways meet the eastern end of SR 272 and assume the name South Quay Road. Just west of the community of Holland, SR 189 splits north from US 58 along two-lane undivided South Quay Road. The state highway has a grade crossing of Norfolk Southern Railway's Franklin District just south of its eastern terminus at US 58 Business, which heads east as Holland Road and east as Ruritan Boulevard.

== Major intersections ==
County	Location	mi	km	Destinations	Notes
Southampton		0.00	0.00	US 258 (Smiths Ferry Road) – North Carolina state line, Murfreesboro, Franklin	Southern terminus
Southampton				SR 714 (Pretlow Road) – Franklin	former SR 189 west
Blackwater River				South Quay Bridge	
City of Suffolk		4.60	7.40	SR 272 east (South Quay Road)	Western terminus of SR 272
City of Suffolk		5.15	8.29	US 58 / US 258 – Franklin, Courtland, Suffolk, Norfolk	interchange
City of Suffolk		Gap in route			
City of Suffolk		10.33	16.62	US 58 west	
City of Suffolk		10.82	17.41	US 58 Bus. (Ruritan Boulevard / Holland Road) – Franklin, Downtown Suffolk	Northern terminus
1.000 mi = 1.609 km; 1.000 km = 0.621 mi

< SR 534	District 5 State Routes; 1928–1933	SR 536 >
