= Midway, King William County, Virginia =

Unincorporated community in Virginia, United States

Midway, Virginia
- Unincorporated community
- Location within Virginia and the United States Midway (the United States)
- Coordinates: 37°45′21″N 77°07′35″W
- Country: United States
- State: Virginia
- County: King William
- Time zone: UTC−5 (Eastern (EST))
  - Summer (DST): UTC−4 (EDT)

Midway is an unincorporated community in King William County, Virginia, United States.

There was a locally renowned country store here that burned down in the mid-1990s. Nothing stands there today.
