= Maryton, Virginia =

Unincorporated community in Virginia, United States

Coordinates: 38°14′16″N 77°20′15″W

Maryton is an unincorporated community in Caroline County, in the U.S. state of Virginia.
