= Central Garage, Virginia =

- Census-designated place
- Location within Virginia Location within the United States
- Coordinates: 37°44′38″N 77°7′53″W
- Country: United States
- State: Virginia
- County: King William

Area
  - Total: 4.9 sq mi (12.6 km^{2})
  - Land: 4.8 sq mi (12.5 km^{2})
  - Water: 0.039 sq mi (0.1 km^{2})
- Elevation: 168 ft (51 m)

Population (2010)
  - Total: 1,318
  - Density: 274/sq mi (105.6/km^{2})
- Time zone: UTC−5 (Eastern (EST))
  - Summer (DST): UTC−4 (EDT)
- Area code: 804
- FIPS code: 51-14312
- GNIS feature ID: 1464687

Central Garage is a census-designated place (CDP) in King William County, Virginia, United States. As of the 2020 census, Central Garage had a population of 1,810.

== Geography ==
The community is northwest of the center of King William County, around the junction of U.S. Route 360 and Virginia State Route 30. US 360 leads northeast 21 miles (34 km) to Tappahannock and southwest 23 miles (37 km) to Richmond, the state capital. VA 30 leads southeast 7 miles (11 km) to King William, the county seat, and northwest 21 miles (34 km) to U.S. Route 1 in Doswell.

According to the U.S. Census Bureau, the Central Garage CDP has a total area of 4.9 square miles (12.6 km^{2}), of which 0.04 square miles (0.1 km^{2}), or 0.81%, are water.

== Demographics ==
Historical population
Census	Pop.	Note	%±
2010	1,318		—
2020	1,810		37.3%
U.S. Decennial Census; 2010 2020

Central Garage was first listed as a census designated place in the 2010 U.S. census.

=== 2020 census ===
As of the 2020 census, Central Garage had a population of 1,810. The median age was 37.4 years. 25.0% of residents were under the age of 18 and 13.3% of residents were 65 years of age or older. For every 100 females there were 102.2 males, and for every 100 females age 18 and over there were 93.6 males age 18 and over.

0.0% of residents lived in urban areas, while 100.0% lived in rural areas.

There were 691 households in Central Garage, of which 35.7% had children under the age of 18 living in them. Of all households, 56.3% were married-couple households, 14.6% were households with a male householder and no spouse or partner present, and 23.7% were households with a female householder and no spouse or partner present. About 20.8% of all households were made up of individuals and 5.8% had someone living alone who was 65 years of age or older.

There were 737 housing units, of which 6.2% were vacant. The homeowner vacancy rate was 3.1% and the rental vacancy rate was 2.4%.

Racial composition as of the 2020 census
Race	Number	Percent
White	1,414	78.1%
Black or African American	214	11.8%
American Indian and Alaska Native	27	1.5%
Asian	14	0.8%
Native Hawaiian and Other Pacific Islander	1	0.1%
Some other race	25	1.4%
Two or more races	115	6.4%
Hispanic or Latino (of any race)	61	3.4%
