= Turpin, Virginia =

Unincorporated community in Virginia, United States

- Unincorporated community
- Location within Virginia and the United States Turpin (the United States)
- Coordinates: 37°45′41″N 77°08′49″W
- Country: United States
- State: Virginia
- County: King William
- Time zone: UTC−5 (Eastern (EST))
  - Summer (DST): UTC−4 (EDT)

Turpin is an unincorporated community in King William County, Virginia, United States.
