= Daltons, Virginia =

Unincorporated community in Virginia, United States

Coordinates: 38°08′07″N 77°25′10″W

Daltons is an unincorporated community in Caroline County, in the U.S. state of Virginia.
