= Hunters, Virginia =

Unincorporated community in Virginia, US

Coordinates: 37°56′27″N 78°14′44″W

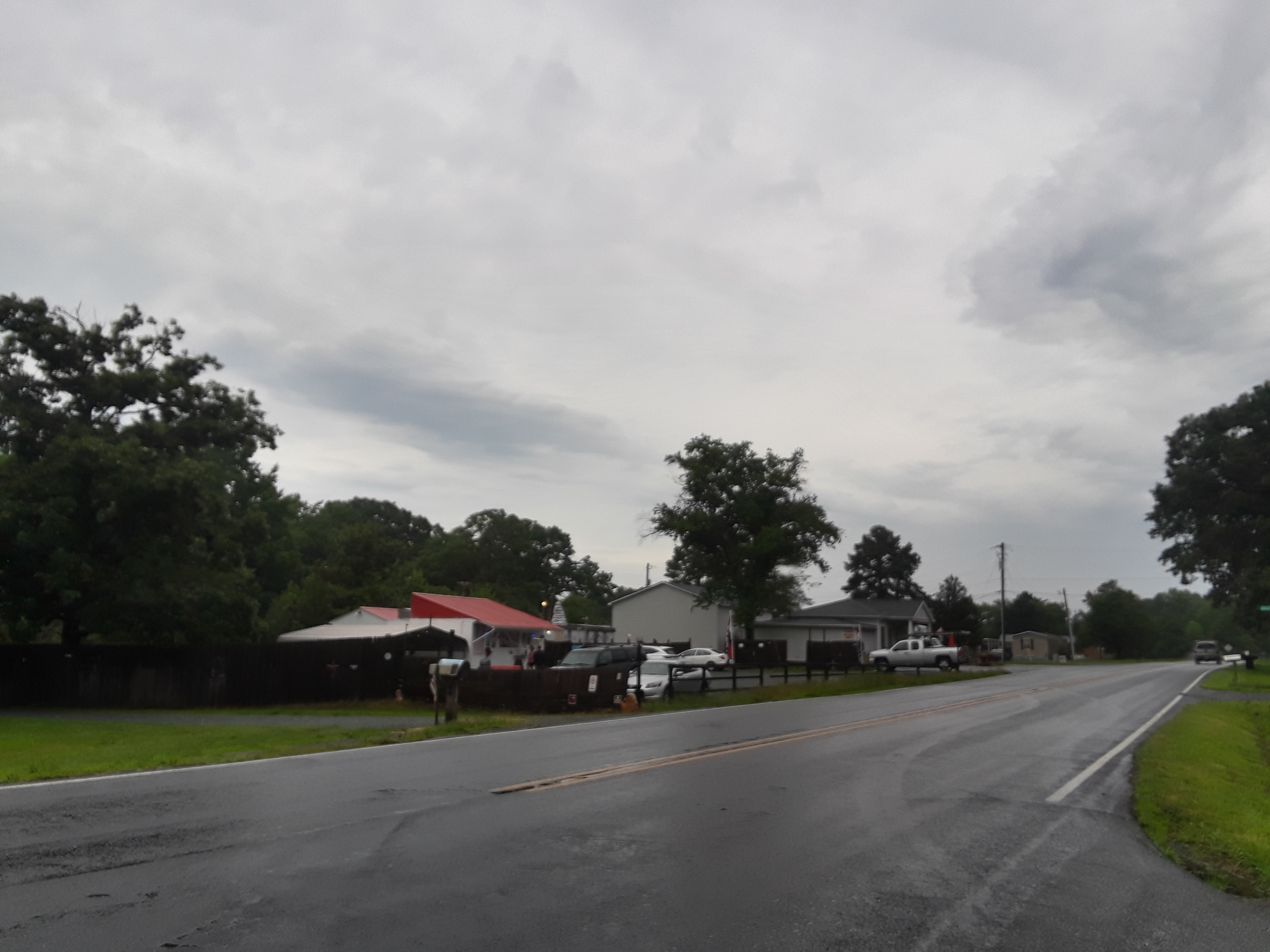
Pa Pa Jim's Soft Serve Treats and Troy Market in Hunters.

Hunters is an unincorporated community in Fluvanna County, in the U.S. state of Virginia.
