= McHenry, Virginia =

Unincorporated community in Virginia, US

Coordinates: 38°10′19″N 77°42′22″W

McHenry is an unincorporated community in Spotsylvania County, in the U.S. state of Virginia.
