= Epworth Hall =

Epworth Hall can refer to:

- Epworth Hall (Gainesville, Florida)
- Epworth Hall (Perry, New York)
