= Monroe Park, Delaware =

Unincorporated community in Delaware, United States

- Unincorporated community
- Location within Delaware Location within the United States
- Coordinates: 39°46′20″N 75°35′46″W
- Country: United States
- State: Delaware
- County: New Castle
- Elevation: 262 ft (80 m)
- Time zone: UTC-5 (Eastern (EST))
  - Summer (DST): UTC-4 (EDT)
- Area code: 302
- GNIS feature ID: 214332

Monroe Park is an unincorporated community in New Castle County, Delaware, United States. Monroe Park is located west of the interchange between Delaware Route 100/Delaware Route 141 and Delaware Route 52 in Greenville.
