= Highland Park, Virginia =

Unincorporated community in Virginia, US

Coordinates: 37°07′21″N 80°59′53″W

Highland Park is an unincorporated community in Pulaski County, in the U.S. state of Virginia.
