= Mangohick, Virginia =

Unincorporated community in Virginia, United States

- Unincorporated community
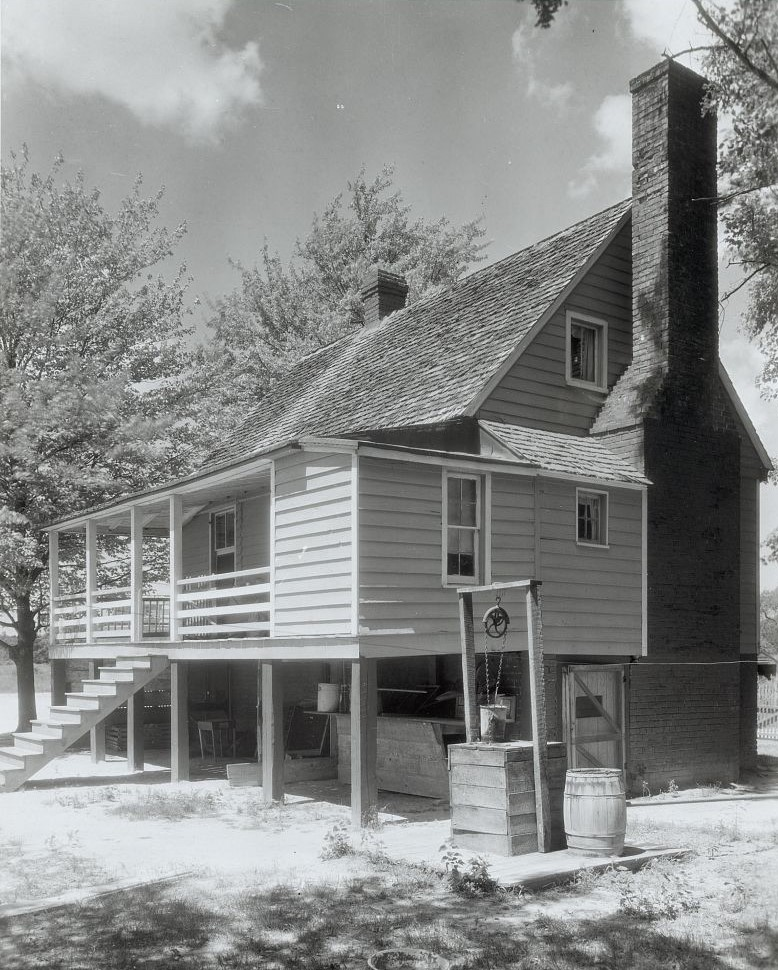
- Mangohick Village house, Mangohick Village, by Frances Benjamin Johnston, 1935

- Location within Virginia and the United States Mangohick (the United States)
- Coordinates: 37°48′37″N 77°16′22″W
- Country: United States
- State: Virginia
- County: King William
- Time zone: UTC−5 (Eastern (EST))
  - Summer (DST): UTC−4 (EDT)

Mangohick is an unincorporated community named after Mangohick Creek in King William County, Virginia, United States. Mangohick Church, located within the community, is listed on the National Register of Historic Places.
