= Lanesville, Virginia =

Unincorporated community in Virginia, United States

- Unincorporated community
- Location within Virginia and the United States Lanesville (the United States)
- Coordinates: 37°36′53″N 76°58′43″W
- Country: United States
- State: Virginia
- County: King William
- Time zone: UTC−5 (Eastern (EST))
  - Summer (DST): UTC−4 (EDT)

Lanesville is an unincorporated community in King William County, Virginia, United States.

== Notable person ==
- Samuel Osborne (1833–1903), an African American custodian and caretaker for 37 years at Colby College
