= Epworth School (Epworth, Iowa) =

- U.S. National Register of Historic Places
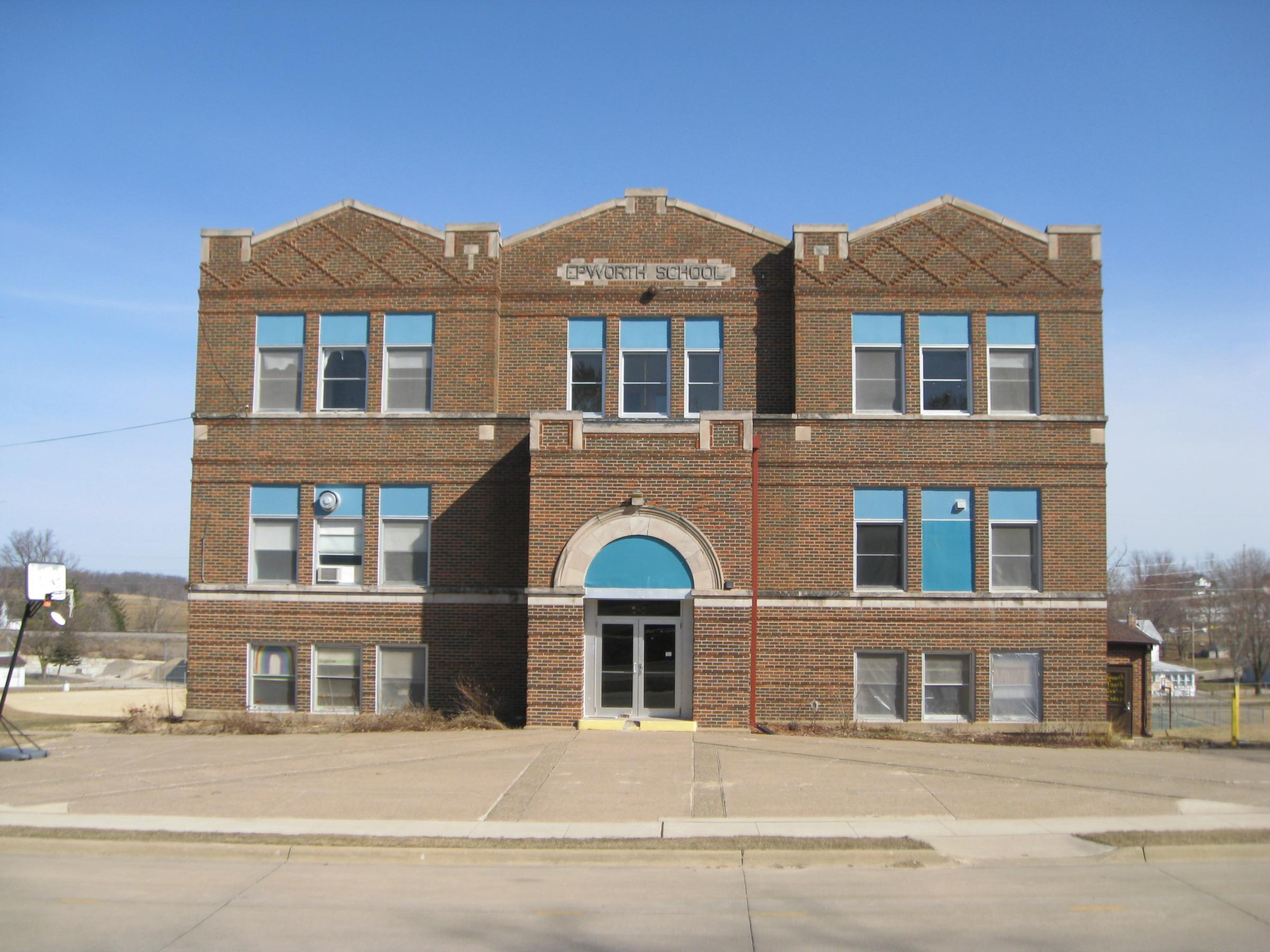

- Location within Iowa Location within the United States
- Location: 310 W. Main St. Epworth, Iowa
- Coordinates: 42°26′46″N 90°56′08″W
- Area: 1.41 acres (0.57 ha)
- Built: 1917
- Built by: John G. Miller
- Architect: Harry Eames Netcott
- Architectural style: Colonial Revival; Romanesque Revival
- NRHP reference No.: 04000340
- Added to NRHP: April 21, 2004

Epworth School, also known as the Epworth Elementary School, was a historic building located in Epworth, Iowa, United States. The Iowa Legislature required a high school education for all students in 1911. The school districts that did not have a high school were required to pay their student's tuition in a district that did. This building was a result of that legislation. Architecturally, the building was a transitional structure between the more decorative styles of the late 19th century and the less ornate styles of the 20th century. Independence, Iowa architect Harry E. Netcott designed the combination Colonial Revival/Romanesque Revival building, and John G. Miller was the contractor. Built in 1917, classes were first held here in January 1918. It initially housed all grades until 1962, when it was converted into an elementary school. After the local school district had built a new building, its last day as a school was May 30, 2003. The City of Epworth acquired the building, and the Epworth Community Historical Society occupied the building. It was listed on the National Register of Historic Places in 2004. Because of maintenance issues, the city decided to take down the building in 2011. The property is now occupied by Tower Park.
