= Oakwood, Wisconsin =

Oakwood, Wisconsin may refer to:

- Oakwood, Milwaukee County, Wisconsin
- Oakwood, Winnebago County, Wisconsin
