= Glendale, New Jersey =

Glendale, New Jersey may refer to:

- Glendale, Camden County, New Jersey
- Glendale, Mercer County, New Jersey
