= Samuel Osborne (custodian) =

American janitor

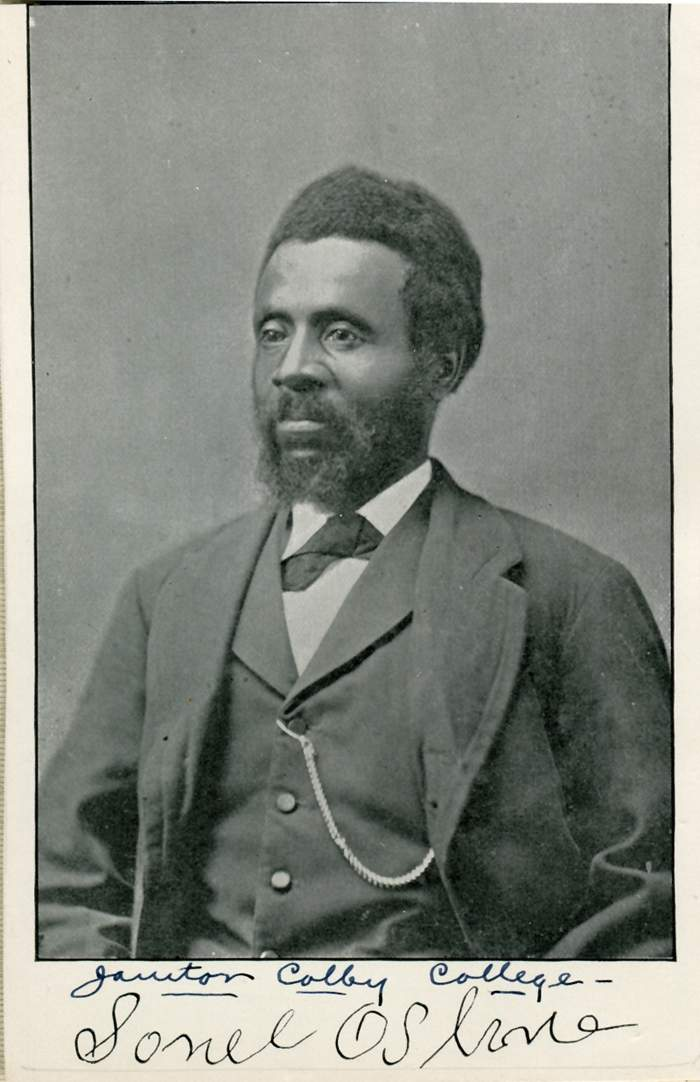
- photograph of Samuel Osborne
- Born: October 20, 1833
- Died: July 1, 1904
- Occupation: Custodian

Samuel Osborne (1833–1904) was an African American custodian and caretaker at Colby College. Osborne was born enslaved in Lanesville, Virginia on October 20, 1833. After emancipation, he and other family members moved to Maine. Osborne's father was initially hired at Colby, and Osborne succeeded him as custodian after his father's death in 1867. His history and treatment at the college are controversial; in particular, he received low pay from the school and suffered racist pranks at the hands of students. He and his wife Maria Iveson Osborne had seven children. In 1900, his daughter Marion became the first African-American woman to graduate from Colby. In May 1904, Osborne fell ill and ceased work at the college. Upon his departure, the Colby College Board of Trustees voted to cancel his mortgage and forgive his unpaid bills.

== Legacy ==
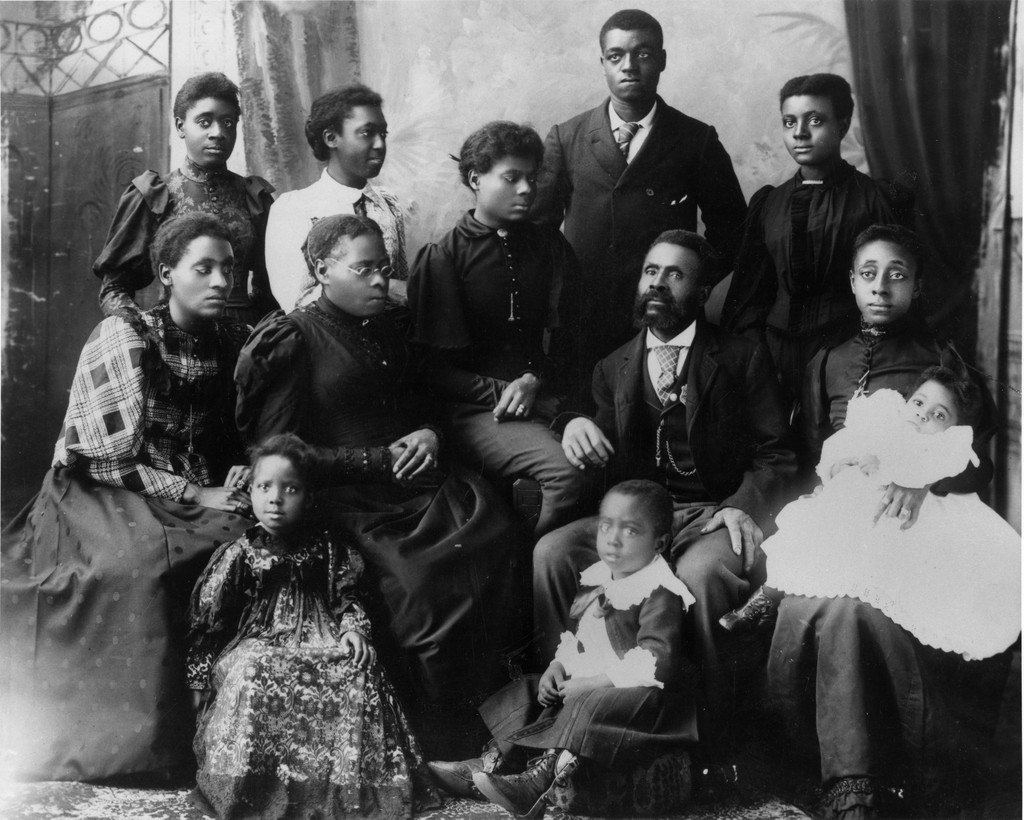
Family of Samuel Osborne

Throughout his tenure, Osborne was frequently written about in the student newspapers and yearbooks. 1913, Colby alumnus Frederick Padelford published a short book about him. The president's house at the school was renamed in 2017 to honor Osborne and his 37 years of service to the college.

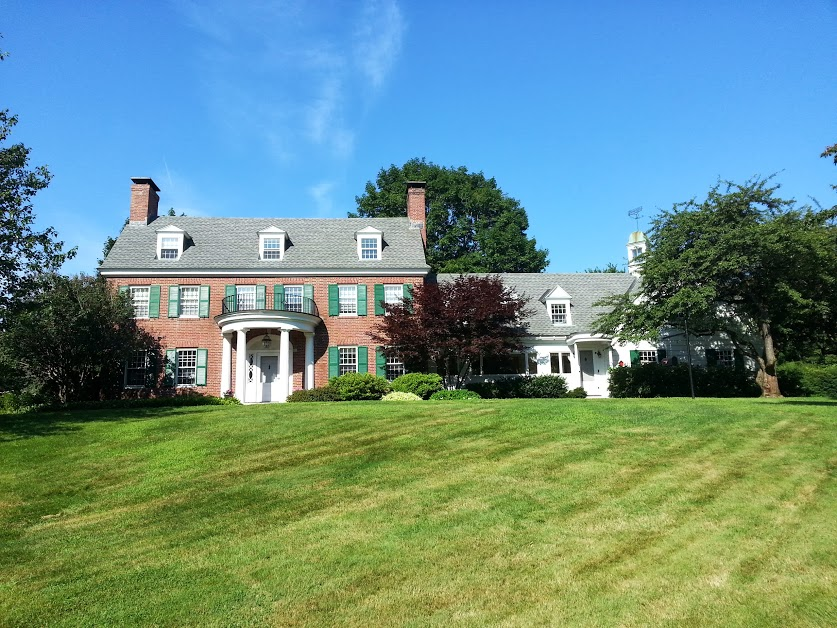
Osborne House at Colby College
