= Newport, New Jersey =

Newport, New Jersey may refer to:

- Newport, Cumberland County, New Jersey
- Newport, Hunterdon County, New Jersey
- Newport, Jersey City, New Jersey
