= Marionville, Virginia =

Unincorporated community in Virginia, US

Coordinates: 37°27′09″N 75°51′17″W

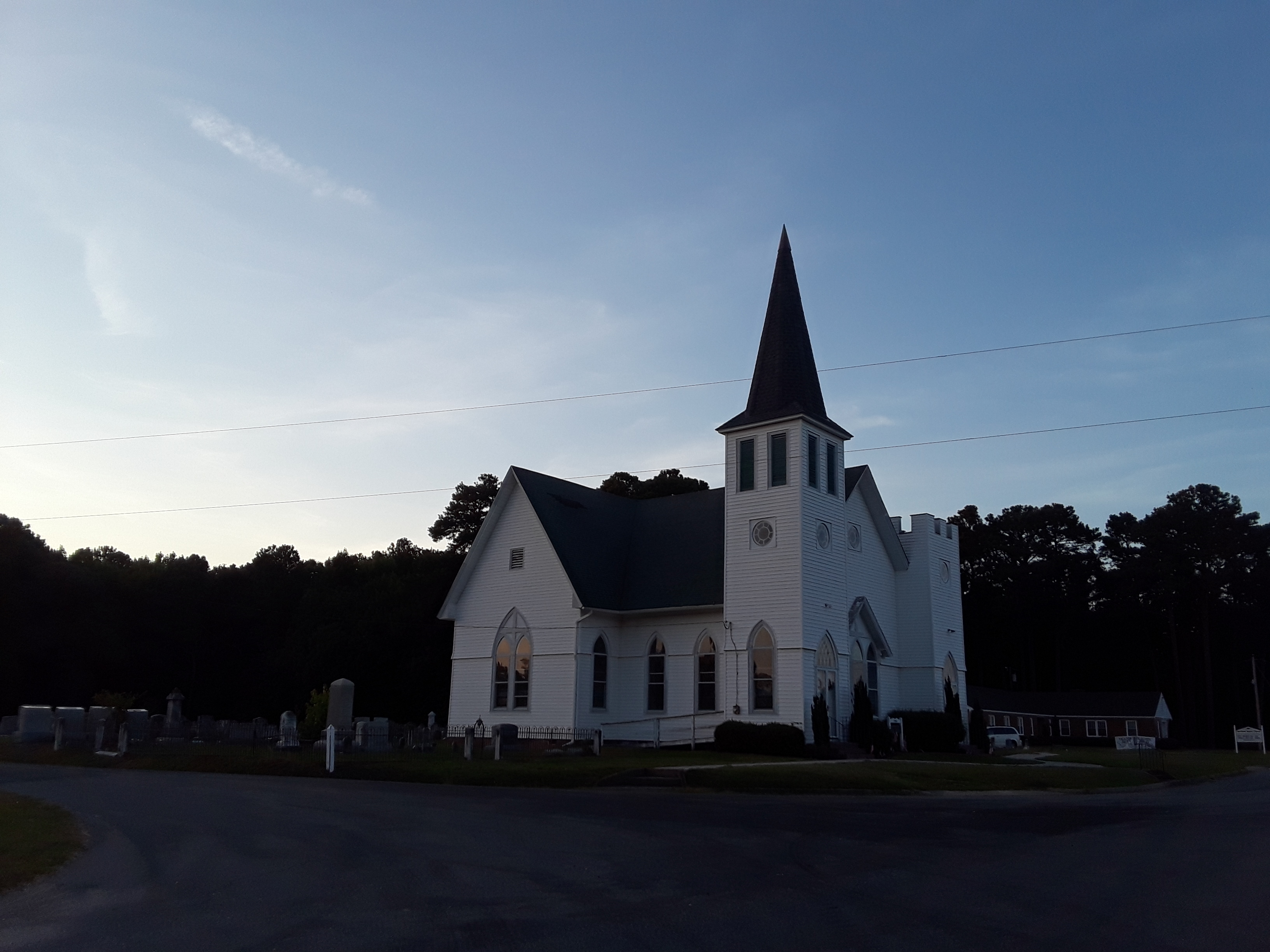
Red Bank Baptist Church in Marionville at dusk, July 2018

Marionville is an unincorporated community in Northampton County, Virginia, United States.

The telephone area code for Marionville is: (757)
