= Barhamsville, Virginia =

Unincorporated community in Virginia, US

Coordinates: 37°27′16.6″N 76°50′25.3″W

Barhamsville (formerly Doncastle) is an unincorporated community in New Kent County, Virginia, United States. It is home to a monastery of the Poor Clares.

Barhamsville is on the south bank of the York River, approximately 70 miles (110 km) from the river's entrance into the Atlantic Ocean. It lies 89 feet (27 m) above mean sea level.
