= King William County, Virginia =

County in Virginia, United States

- County
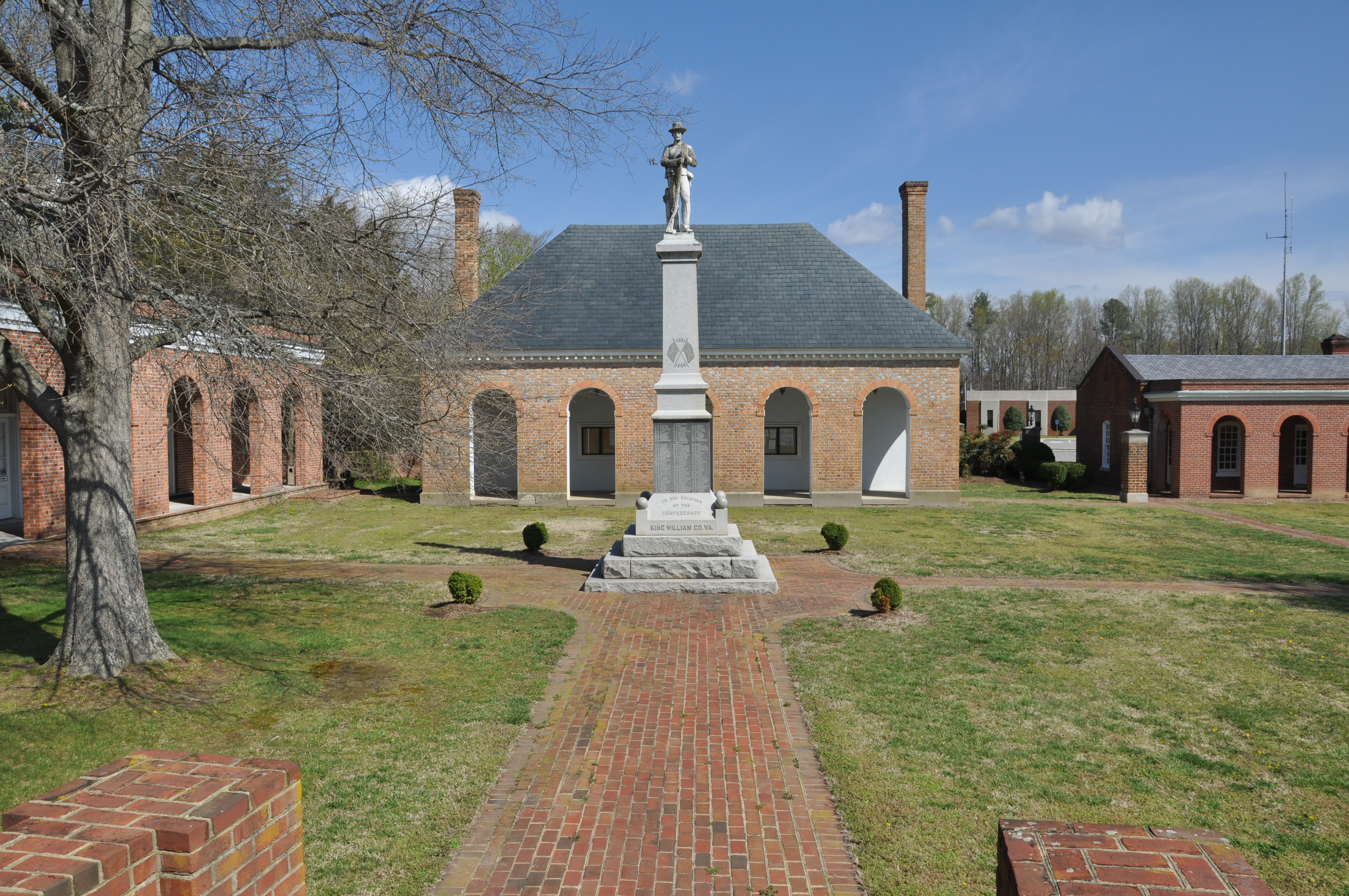
- King William County Courthouse, the oldest in continuous use in the United States

- Seal

- Location within the U.S. state of Virginia
- Coordinates: 37°43′N 77°05′W
- Country: United States
- State: Virginia
- Founded: 1702
- Named for: William III
- Seat: King William
- Largest town: West Point

Area
  - Total: 286 sq mi (740 km^{2})
  - Land: 274 sq mi (710 km^{2})
  - Water: 12 sq mi (31 km^{2}) 4.1%

Population (2020)
  - Total: 17,810
  - Estimate (2025): 19,617 ▲
  - Density: 62/sq mi (24/km^{2})
- Time zone: UTC−5 (Eastern)
  - Summer (DST): UTC−4 (EDT)
- Congressional district: 1st
- Website: www.kwc.gov

King William County is a county located in the U.S. state of Virginia. As of the 2020 census, the population was 17,810. Its county seat is King William. King William County is located in the Middle Peninsula and is included in the Greater Richmond Region.

== History ==
For thousands of years before European contact, Indigenous peoples of North America lived across the Tidewater region. At the time of the founding of Jamestown, 30 Native American tribes comprised the Powhatan Confederacy, numbering 14,000-21,000 people. The Algonquian-speaking Mattaponi Indian Tribe and Upper Mattaponi tribe, among the 6 tribes recognized by the federal government, are located in the county. The Mattaponi are one of two Virginia Indian tribes who still occupy reservation land first allocated by the English under treaty in the 17th century.

One prominent family during Colonial Virginia times was that of William Aylett. The Tobacco Inspection Act of 1730 established a tobacco inspection warehouse at Aylett's. Aylett's daughters intermarried with other Northern Neck families.

English colonists formed King William County in 1702 out of King and Queen County. The county is named for William of Orange, King of England. The courthouse, built in 1725, is the oldest courthouse in continuous use in the United States.

== Geography ==
According to the U.S. Census Bureau, the county has a total area of 286 square miles (740 km^{2}), of which 274 square miles (710 km^{2}) is land and 12 square miles (31 km^{2}) (4.1%) is water. King William County is bounded by the Mattaponi River to the north and the Pamunkey River to the south. The two rivers combine to form the York River, at West Point, the county's largest town.

=== Adjacent counties ===
- Caroline County - northwest
- King and Queen County - northeast
- New Kent County - south
- Hanover County - southwest

=== Major highways ===
- US 360
- SR 30
- SR 33
- SR 296
- SR 298

== Demographics ==
Historical population
| Census | Pop. | Note | %± |
|---|---|---|---|
| 1790 | 8,128 | | — |
| 1800 | 9,055 | | 11.4% |
| 1810 | 9,285 | | 2.5% |
| 1820 | 9,697 | | 4.4% |
| 1830 | 9,812 | | 1.2% |
| 1840 | 9,258 | | −5.6% |
| 1850 | 8,779 | | −5.2% |
| 1860 | 8,530 | | −2.8% |
| 1870 | 7,515 | | −11.9% |
| 1880 | 8,751 | | 16.4% |
| 1890 | 9,605 | | 9.8% |
| 1900 | 8,380 | | −12.8% |
| 1910 | 8,547 | | 2.0% |
| 1920 | 8,739 | | 2.2% |
| 1930 | 7,929 | | −9.3% |
| 1940 | 7,855 | | −0.9% |
| 1950 | 7,589 | | −3.4% |
| 1960 | 7,563 | | −0.3% |
| 1970 | 7,497 | | −0.9% |
| 1980 | 9,334 | | 24.5% |
| 1990 | 10,913 | | 16.9% |
| 2000 | 13,146 | | 20.5% |
| 2010 | 15,935 | | 21.2% |
| 2020 | 17,810 | | 11.8% |
| 2025 (est.) | 19,617 | ▲ | 10.1% |
U.S. Decennial Census; 1790-1960 1900-1990; 1990-2000 2010 2020

=== Racial and ethnic composition ===
King William County, Virginia – Racial and ethnic composition Note: the US Census treats Hispanic/Latino as an ethnic category. This table excludes Latinos from the racial categories and assigns them to a separate category. Hispanics/Latinos may be of any race.
| Race / Ethnicity (NH = Non-Hispanic) | Pop 1980 | Pop 1990 | Pop 2000 | Pop 2010 | Pop 2020 | % 1980 | % 1990 | % 2000 | % 2010 | % 2020 |
|---|---|---|---|---|---|---|---|---|---|---|
| White alone (NH) | 5,844 | 7,307 | 9,654 | 12,107 | 13,499 | 62.61% | 66.96% | 73.44% | 75.98% | 75.79% |
| Black or African American alone (NH) | 3,169 | 3,295 | 2,974 | 2,806 | 2,585 | 33.95% | 30.19% | 22.62% | 17.61% | 14.51% |
| Native American or Alaska Native alone (NH) | 210 | 217 | 193 | 223 | 277 | 2.25% | 1.99% | 1.47% | 1.40% | 1.56% |
| Asian alone (NH) | 26 | 24 | 48 | 118 | 129 | 0.28% | 0.22% | 0.37% | 0.74% | 0.72% |
| Native Hawaiian or Pacific Islander alone (NH) | x | x | 0 | 3 | 9 | x | x | 0.00% | 0.02% | 0.05% |
| Other race alone (NH) | 7 | 4 | 22 | 12 | 76 | 0.07% | 0.04% | 0.17% | 0.08% | 0.43% |
| Mixed race or Multiracial (NH) | x | x | 135 | 342 | 759 | x | x | 1.03% | 2.15% | 4.26% |
| Hispanic or Latino (any race) | 78 | 66 | 120 | 324 | 476 | 0.84% | 0.60% | 0.91% | 2.03% | 2.67% |
| Total | 9,334 | 10,913 | 13,146 | 15,935 | 17,810 | 100.00% | 100.00% | 100.00% | 100.00% | 100.00% |

=== 2020 census ===
As of the 2020 census, the county had a population of 17,810. The median age was 40.9 years. 22.8% of residents were under the age of 18 and 17.2% of residents were 65 years of age or older. For every 100 females there were 94.5 males, and for every 100 females age 18 and over there were 91.7 males age 18 and over.

The racial makeup of the county was 76.6% White, 14.6% Black or African American, 1.6% American Indian and Alaska Native, 0.7% Asian, 0.1% Native Hawaiian and Pacific Islander, 1.3% from some other race, and 5.1% from two or more races. Hispanic or Latino residents of any race comprised 2.7% of the population.

0.0% of residents lived in urban areas, while 100.0% lived in rural areas.

There were 6,914 households in the county, of which 33.4% had children under the age of 18 living with them and 23.2% had a female householder with no spouse or partner present. About 23.2% of all households were made up of individuals and 10.1% had someone living alone who was 65 years of age or older.

There were 7,402 housing units, of which 6.6% were vacant. Among occupied housing units, 82.9% were owner-occupied and 17.1% were renter-occupied. The homeowner vacancy rate was 1.2% and the rental vacancy rate was 5.8%.

=== 2010 Census ===
As of the 2010 United States census, there were 15,935 people living in the county. 77.2% were White, 17.7% Black or African American, 1.4% Native American, 0.7% Asian, 0.6% of some other race and 2.3% of two or more races. 2.0% were Hispanic or Latino (of any race). 18.6% were of English, 16.5% American, 8.7% German and 7.6% Irish ancestry.

=== 2000 Census ===
As of the census of 2000, there were 13,146 people, 4,846 households, and 3,784 families living in the county. The population density was 48 people per square mile (19 people/km^{2}). There were 5,189 housing units at an average density of 19 units per square mile (7.3 units/km^{2}). The racial makeup of the county was 73.81% White, 22.81% Black or African American, 1.54% Native American, 0.37% Asian, 0.33% from other races, and 1.15% from two or more races. 0.91% of the population were Hispanic or Latino of any race.

There were 4,846 households, out of which 36.40% had children under the age of 18 living with them, 63.90% were married couples living together, 10.20% had a female householder with no husband present, and 21.90% were non-families. 18.30% of all households were made up of individuals, and 7.60% had someone living alone who was 65 years of age or older. The average household size was 2.69 and the average family size was 3.06.

In the county, the population was spread out, with 26.10% under the age of 18, 5.90% from 18 to 24, 31.50% from 25 to 44, 24.80% from 45 to 64, and 11.70% who were 65 years of age or older. The median age was 37 years. For every 100 females, there were 96.90 males. For every 100 females age 18 and over, there were 93.90 males.

The median income for a household in the county was $49,876, and the median income for a family was $54,037. Males had a median income of $34,616 versus $25,578 for females. The per capita income for the county was $21,928. About 4.40% of families and 5.50% of the population were below the poverty line, including 6.00% of those under age 18 and 9.00% of those age 65 or over.

== Communities ==
=== Town ===
- West Point

=== Census-designated places ===
- Central Garage
- King William

=== Other unincorporated communities ===
- Aylett
- Aylett Mill
- Beulahville
- Calno
- Chericoke
- Cohoke
- Corinth Fork
- Duane
- Duane Fork
- Elsing Green
- Enfield
- Epworth
- Etna Mills
- Globe
- Gordon Landing
- Horse Landing
- Horseshoe
- Johnson Landing
- Keith
- Lanesville
- Mangohick
- Manquin
- Midway
- Pointers Landing
- Pollards Corner
- Poplar Landing
- Port Richmond
- Riverview Landing
- Romancoke
- Rosespout
- Rumford
- Scotland Landing
- Tuck Fork
- Turpin
- Upshaw
- Venter
- Wakema
- White Oak Landing
- Whitebank

Two Indian reservations exist in the county. They are the only ones in the Commonwealth of Virginia.

== Government ==
=== Board of Supervisors ===
- First District: Brenton Bohannon (I)
- Second District: Ben Edwards (I)
- Third District: Justin Catlett (I)
- Fourth District: Lindsay May Robinson (I)
- Fifth District: Keith Fogg (I)

=== Constitutional Officers ===
- Clerk of the Circuit Court: Tina Glazebrook (I)
- Commissioner of the Revenue: Karena Funkhouser (I)
- Commonwealth's Attorney: Tiffany Webb (I)
- Sheriff: Thomas D. (Don) Lumpkin (I)
- Treasurer: Abbi N. Carlton (I)

Derek Stamey serves as the County Administrator for King William, having been appointed in March 2026.

King William is represented by Republican Richard H. Stuart in the Virginia Senate, Republicans Scott A. Wyatt and M. Keith Hodges in the Virginia House of Delegates, and Republican Robert J. 'Rob" Wittman in the US House of Representatives.

United States presidential election results for King William County, Virginia
| Year | Republican | | Democratic | | Third party(ies) | |
| Year | No. | % | No. | % | No. | % |
|---|---|---|---|---|---|---|
| 1880 | 792 | 53.91% | 677 | 46.09% | 0 | 0.00% |
| 1884 | 1,033 | 56.91% | 782 | 43.09% | 0 | 0.00% |
| 1888 | 1,093 | 59.43% | 746 | 40.57% | 0 | 0.00% |
| 1892 | 844 | 54.10% | 672 | 43.08% | 44 | 2.82% |
| 1896 | 990 | 62.15% | 592 | 37.16% | 11 | 0.69% |
| 1900 | 871 | 64.81% | 462 | 34.38% | 11 | 0.82% |
| 1904 | 195 | 38.77% | 304 | 60.44% | 4 | 0.80% |
| 1908 | 228 | 44.88% | 276 | 54.33% | 4 | 0.79% |
| 1912 | 69 | 15.72% | 305 | 69.48% | 65 | 14.81% |
| 1916 | 119 | 25.81% | 342 | 74.19% | 0 | 0.00% |
| 1920 | 176 | 32.90% | 353 | 65.98% | 6 | 1.12% |
| 1924 | 148 | 27.77% | 372 | 69.79% | 13 | 2.44% |
| 1928 | 329 | 43.29% | 431 | 56.71% | 0 | 0.00% |
| 1932 | 177 | 22.01% | 612 | 76.12% | 15 | 1.87% |
| 1936 | 211 | 23.19% | 696 | 76.48% | 3 | 0.33% |
| 1940 | 235 | 25.21% | 697 | 74.79% | 0 | 0.00% |
| 1944 | 280 | 28.06% | 718 | 71.94% | 0 | 0.00% |
| 1948 | 348 | 35.84% | 476 | 49.02% | 147 | 15.14% |
| 1952 | 730 | 57.39% | 533 | 41.90% | 9 | 0.71% |
| 1956 | 887 | 62.16% | 357 | 25.02% | 183 | 12.82% |
| 1960 | 793 | 51.19% | 745 | 48.10% | 11 | 0.71% |
| 1964 | 1,065 | 53.92% | 904 | 45.77% | 6 | 0.30% |
| 1968 | 1,046 | 43.03% | 764 | 31.43% | 621 | 25.55% |
| 1972 | 1,839 | 69.14% | 797 | 29.96% | 24 | 0.90% |
| 1976 | 1,597 | 50.60% | 1,501 | 47.56% | 58 | 1.84% |
| 1980 | 2,036 | 56.54% | 1,446 | 40.16% | 119 | 3.30% |
| 1984 | 2,803 | 65.43% | 1,448 | 33.80% | 33 | 0.77% |
| 1988 | 2,735 | 62.89% | 1,561 | 35.89% | 53 | 1.22% |
| 1992 | 2,591 | 49.54% | 1,822 | 34.84% | 817 | 15.62% |
| 1996 | 2,346 | 52.49% | 1,765 | 39.49% | 358 | 8.01% |
| 2000 | 3,547 | 61.48% | 2,125 | 36.83% | 97 | 1.68% |
| 2004 | 4,397 | 63.98% | 2,436 | 35.45% | 39 | 0.57% |
| 2008 | 4,966 | 59.20% | 3,344 | 39.87% | 78 | 0.93% |
| 2012 | 5,466 | 61.26% | 3,344 | 37.48% | 113 | 1.27% |
| 2016 | 5,975 | 65.22% | 2,760 | 30.13% | 426 | 4.65% |
| 2020 | 7,320 | 68.18% | 3,260 | 30.37% | 156 | 1.45% |
| 2024 | 8,080 | 69.76% | 3,388 | 29.25% | 115 | 0.99% |

== Education ==
There are two school districts: King William County Public Schools (for all other areas), and West Point Town Public Schools (for areas in the Town of West Point).

== See also ==
- National Register of Historic Places listings in King William County, Virginia
