= Epworth, Virginia =

Unincorporated community in Virginia, United States

- Unincorporated community
- Location within Virginia and the United States Epworth (the United States)
- Coordinates: 37°47′28″N 77°12′43″W
- Country: United States
- State: Virginia
- County: King William
- Time zone: UTC−5 (Eastern (EST))
  - Summer (DST): UTC−4 (EDT)

Epworth is an unincorporated community that is located in King William County, Virginia, United States.
