= National Register of Historic Places listings in King William County, Virginia =

Location of King William County in Virginia

This is a list of the National Register of Historic Places listings in King William County, Virginia.

This is intended to be a complete list of the properties and districts on the National Register of Historic Places in King William County, Virginia, United States. The locations of National Register properties and districts for which the latitude and longitude coordinates are included below, may be seen in an online map.

The county has 22 properties and districts listed on the National Register, including 1 National Historic Landmark.

This National Park Service list is complete through NPS recent listings posted March 6, 2026.

== Current listings ==
	Name on the Register	Image	Date listed	Location	City or town	Description
1	Bear Garden		January 16, 2026 (#100012561)	1202 Calno Road; 37°47′29″N 77°18′03″W	Hanover	
2	Burlington	Burlington	January 30, 1978 (#78003023)	River Rd. southeast of Beulahville; 37°50′40″N 77°08′38″W	Aylett	
3	Chelsea	Chelsea	November 12, 1969 (#69000253)	North of the junction of State Route 30 and Chelsea Rd. 37°35′55″N 76°49′38″W	West Point	
4	Chericoke	Chericoke	September 8, 1980 (#80004195)	West of Falls on Chericoke Rd. 37°38′09″N 77°06′45″W	Falls	
5	Cherry Grove		September 5, 2023 (#100009312)	4381 Manfield Rd. 37°44′00″N 77°12′39″W	Aylett vicinity	
6	Elsing Green	Elsing Green	November 12, 1969 (#69000252)	Southwest of the junction of Union Hope and Mount Olive Cohoke Rds. 37°36′08″N 77°03′04″W	Tunstall	
7	Horn Quarter	Horn Quarter	June 9, 1980 (#80004196)	Northwest of Manquin on Etna Mills Rd. 37°46′34″N 77°18′42″W	Manquin	
8	King William County Courthouse	King William County Courthouse	October 1, 1969 (#69000251)	Horse Landing Rd., off State Route 30; 37°41′16″N 77°00′48″W	King William	
9	King William Training School	King William Training School	September 19, 2006 (#06000872)	18627 State Route 30; 37°41′44″N 77°01′58″W	King William	
10	Lanesville Christadelphian Church	Lanesville Christadelphian Church	January 14, 2019 (#100003314)	7442 Mount Olive Cohoke Rd. 37°36′52″N 76°58′43″W	King William	
11	Mangohick Church	Mangohick Church	December 5, 1972 (#72001402)	Mangohick Church Rd., south of State Route 30; 37°48′28″N 77°16′18″W	Mangohick	
12	Mount Columbia	Mount Columbia	January 19, 1989 (#88003208)	Off Brandywine Rd., 2.7 miles (4.3 km) west of Manfield Rd. 37°42′49″N 77°11′11″W	Manquin	
13	Pamunkey Indian Reservation Archaeological District	Pamunkey Indian Reservation Archaeological District	September 16, 1982 (#82004567)	Entirety of the Pamunkey Indian Reservation; 37°34′32″N 77°00′14″W	Lanesville	
14	Roseville Plantation	Roseville Plantation	August 8, 2007 (#07000800)	3736 Herring Creek Rd. 37°51′09″N 77°15′30″W	Aylett	
15	St. John's Church	St. John's Church	April 24, 1973 (#73002214)	Northwest of Sweet Hall on State Route 30; 37°36′59″N 76°55′16″W	Sweet Hall	
16	Seven Springs	Seven Springs	May 6, 1980 (#80004194)	West of Enfield; 37°44′47″N 77°13′54″W	Enfield	
17	Sharon Indian School	Sharon Indian School	July 27, 2007 (#07000764)	13383 State Route 30; 37°44′04″N 77°06′50″W	King William	
18	Sweet Hall	Sweet Hall	November 7, 1977 (#77001490)	South of Sweet Hall Road (State Route 634); 37°34′11″N 76°54′16″W	Sweet Hall	
19	West Point Historic District	West Point Historic District	October 3, 1996 (#96001051)	Kirby, Main, and Lee Sts. from 1st through 13th Sts. 37°32′00″N 76°47′51″W	West Point	
20	Windsor Shades	Windsor Shades	May 22, 1978 (#78003025)	South of Sweet Hall Road (State Route 634); 37°34′15″N 76°54′38″W	Sweet Hall	
21	Wyoming	Wyoming	February 8, 1980 (#80004197)	North of Studley on Nelsons Bridge Rd. 37°43′24″N 77°17′10″W	Studley	
22	Zoar	Zoar	June 22, 2007 (#06000065)	Upshaw Rd. 37°47′19″N 77°06′38″W	Aylett	

== See also ==
- List of National Historic Landmarks in Virginia
- National Register of Historic Places listings in Virginia
