= West Point Historic District =

West Point Historic District may refer to:

- West Point Historic District (West Point, Kentucky), listed on the National Register of Historic Places in Hardin County, Kentucky
- West Point Historic District (West Point, Virginia), listed on the National Register of Historic Places in King William County, Virginia
