= Caroline Bradby Cook =

Native American female leader

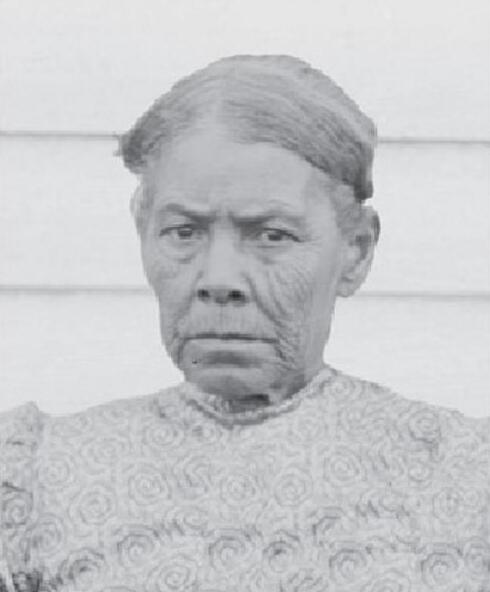
- Born: Caroline Bradby c. 1839; Pamunkey Indian Reservation, King William County, Virginia, U.S.
- Died: January 15 1913; Pamunkey Indian Reservation, King William County, Virginia, U.S.
- Spouse: Major Cook
- Children: George Major Cook

Caroline Bradby Cook (born circa 1839 – died January 15 1913) was a Pamunkey leader and Union sympathizer who championed the rights of Virginia's Native Americans and their cultural heritage.

== Biography ==
Caroline Bradby Cook was born around 1839 and lived on the Pamunkey Indian Reservation in King William County.

She was married to Major Cook, and in 1861, she had her only child, George Major Cook. Her husband died in the same year. Her son, George Major Cook, became the chief of the Pamunkey in 1902 and served until he died in 1930.

During the American Civil War, Caroline was loyal to the United States and supported their cause. When Union army units camped on the reservation, she washed and cooked for the soldiers, despite them dismantling her house and fence and burning it for wood for their campfires.

After the Civil War, she filed a claim with the Southern Claims Commission for compensation from the government for her ruined property. She received $100 in compensation in 1879.

In 1865, Caroline was a founding member of the Pamunkey Indian Baptist Church.

== Legacy and honors ==
In 2009, Caroline was honored as a Virginia Women in History inductee.

Pipe bowls owned by Caroline and a 1919 photograph of her (apparently mis-dated) are in the permanent collection of the Smithsonian National Museum of the American Indian.
