= Sweet Hall =

Historic house in Virginia, United States

- U.S. National Register of Historic Places
- Virginia Landmarks Register
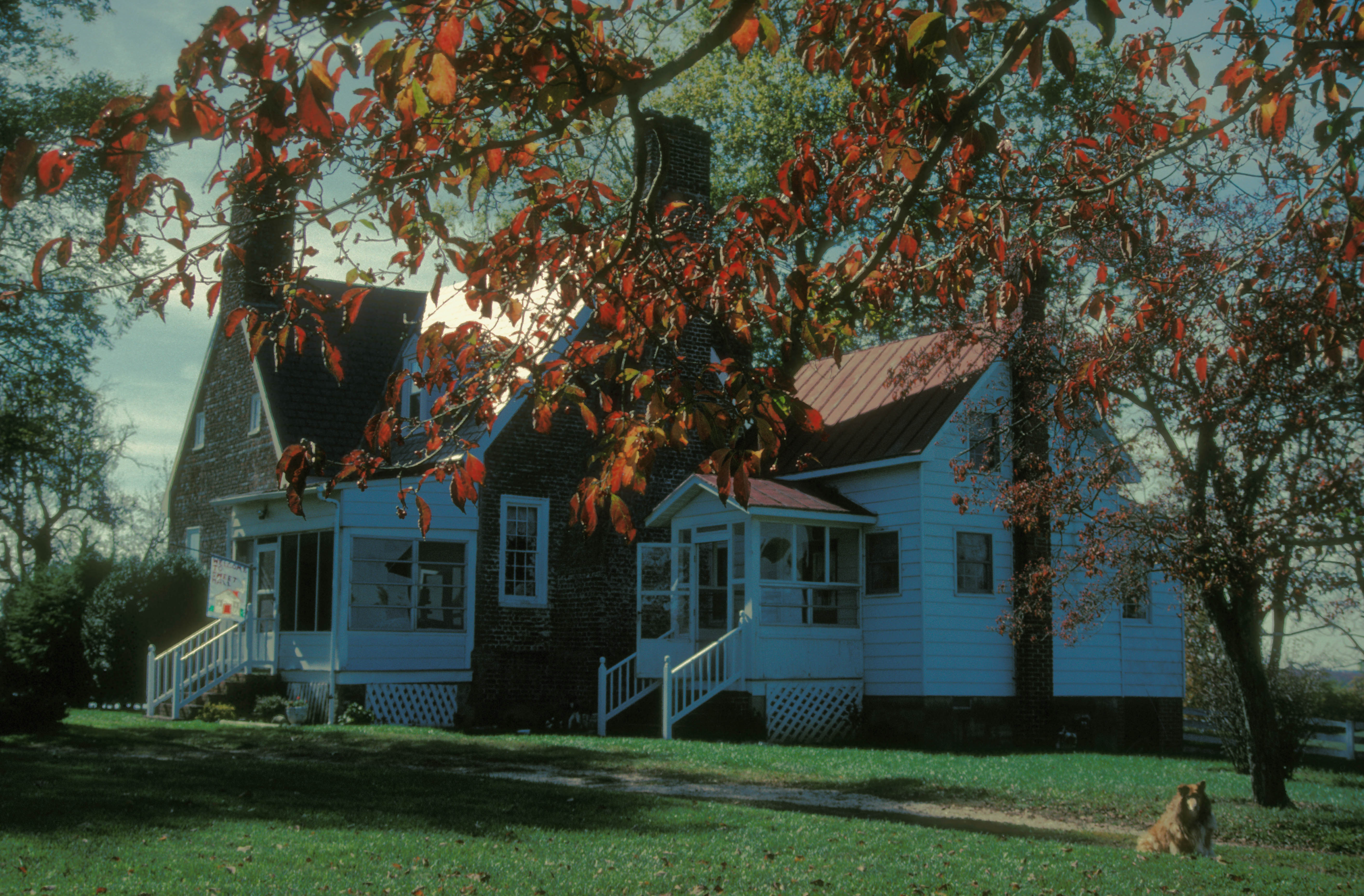
- Sweet Hall, April 1971

- Location within Virginia Location within the United States
- Location: S of King William, near King William, Virginia
- Coordinates: 37°34′12″N 76°54′11″W
- Area: 65 acres (26 ha)
- Built: 1720
- Architectural style: Pre-Georgian
- NRHP reference No.: 77001490
- VLR No.: 050-0067

Significant dates
- Added to NRHP: November 7, 1977
- Designated VLR: February 15, 1977

Sweet Hall is a historic former plantation house for which the existing location Sweet Hall, Virginia is named. The only surviving house in the county with upper cruck roof framing (once common in rural England but never in what became the United States), it has been listed on the National Register of Historic Places since 1977.

== History ==
In 1655 and 1677, land in King William County (then part of New Kent County now only across the Pamunkey River), was patented on behalf of Thomas Claiborne (1647-1683) the son of powerful merchant and politician William Claiborne (d. 1676) who served as the colony's secretary and sat on the Virginia Governor's Council. Because many county records were destroyed over time, the exact location of that Thomas Claiborne's patent is unknown, but members of the Claiborne family established Romancoke plantation (which later served as the family's main plantation) in that era, and his brother William Claiborne Jr. served in the House of Burgesses. His son (William Claiborne's grandson) Thomas Claiborne (1680-1732) helped found the town of West Point (then known as "Dillaware Town") and resided at Sweet Hall as the century ended and the new century began. By 1720 that Thomas Claiborne lived at Sweet Hall and received legislative approval to operate a ferry between Sweet Hall and "Tank's Queen's Creek" (which the legislature reaffirmed in 1748 as to "Claiborne Gooch's"). His son Thomas Claiborne (1704-1735) moved westward to become clerk of Stafford County, but was buried at Sweet Hall, as was his father. Nathaniel Claiborne (d. 1756) inherited and lived at Sweet Hall, and he and his widow operated the ferry.

Nathaniel Claiborne and his wife had two daughters who married sons of Robert Ruffin. The Ruffin family, likewise one of the First Families of Virginia, had extensive landholdings in many counties and held many political offices. By 1773, Robert Ruffin offered the 400 acre plantation for sale, stating that he had bought it from a trust (possibly foreclosed mortgage) held by Roger Gregory. Apparently, no buyer could be found, for James Ruffin insured the Sweet Hall house in 1801.

Following the depredations of the War of 1812, William George Vidal bought the house and insured it with no deductions for bad repair. However, he committed suicide there, so the property was again advertised for sale in 1829. It was later acquired by Capt. Sterling Lipscombe and his son in law R.T. Puller owned it in 1897. The Palmer family bought the property in 1924 and family members continued to own it as least through its National Register listing in 1977.

== Architecture ==
The 1 1/2-story, asymmetrical T-shaped brick dwelling is a noteworthy example of pre-Georgian architecture. The front facade is five bays wide and the house is topped by a rare upper cruck, or curved-principal, gable roof with dormers.

== See also ==
- National Register of Historic Places listings in King William County, Virginia
- Windsor Shades
