= Windsor Shades =

Historic house in Virginia, United States

- U.S. National Register of Historic Places
- Virginia Landmarks Register
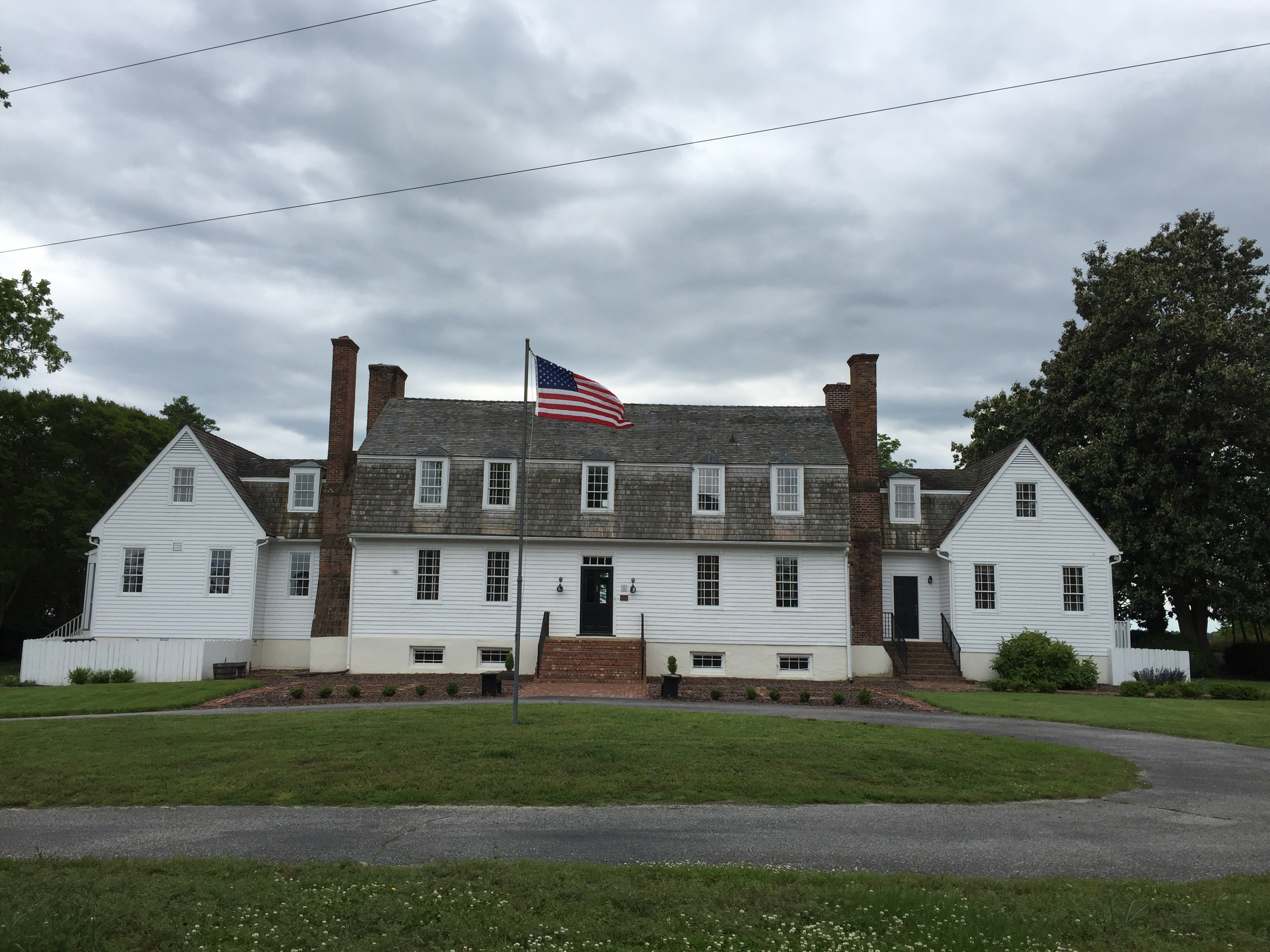
- Windsor Shades in 2018

- Location within Virginia Location within the United States
- Location: Sweet Hall, Virginia; United States
- Coordinates: 37°34′13″N 76°54′35″W
- Area: 14 acres (5.7 ha)
- Built: 1745-1755
- NRHP reference No.: 78003025
- VLR No.: 050-0070

Significant dates
- Added to NRHP: May 22, 1978
- Designated VLR: December 21, 1976

Windsor Shades (also known as Ruffin's Ferry and Waterville) is located on the Pamunkey River in Sweet Hall, Virginia, United States. It is listed on the National Register of Historic Places. Archeological native artifacts found on the property surrounding the house suggest it was the site of Kupkipcok, a Pamunkey village noted on John Smith's 1609 map.

== Description ==
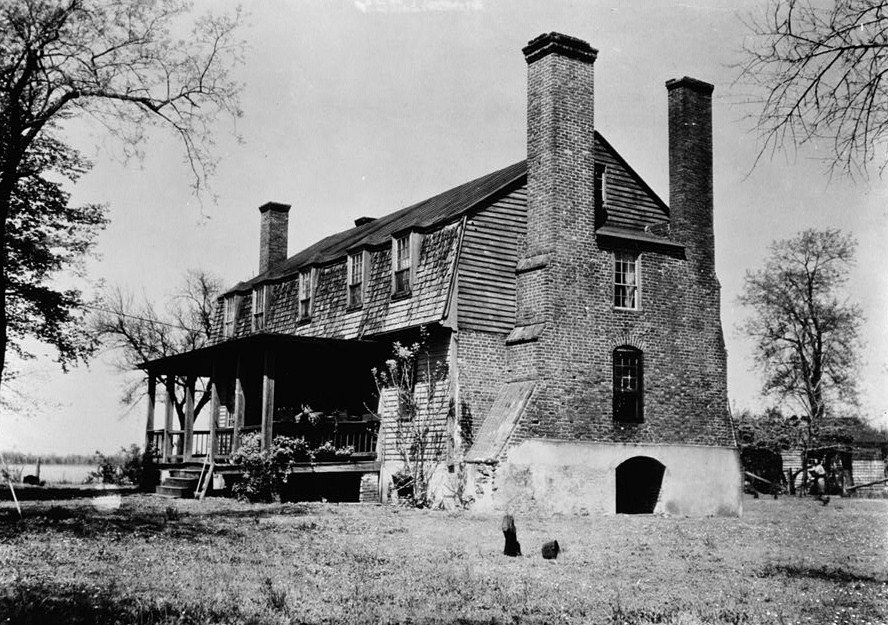
Windsor Shades, unknown date

The property's land title is not clear, owing to the destruction of King William County records, but the house is assumed to have been built around 1750. It is a story-and-a-half, 5 bay gambled roofed, frame structure covered with beaded weatherboards and set on a low, stone and English-bond brick basement. The house has striking massive Flemish-bond brick chimney stacks at either end. In the basement is a large tavern room with reportedly one of the largest interior cooking hearths in Tidewater, Virginia. The site was listed on the National Register of Historic Places in 1978. In 1999 two wings were added on either side of the main block with little alteration of the original structure.

In 1754, Captain Thomas Dansie established a ferry at the site and operated a tavern in the house. The ferry was in operation until 1927 when a bridge was built in West Point. During the years the house was operated as a tavern with a ferry crossing, it was frequented by many notable travelers such as George Washington, who patronized it from the 1750s on his Burgess Route to Williamsburg. In August 1781, the Marquis de Lafayette crossed the Pamunkey by ferry with 4,500 troops. He spent two weeks in King William County, moving between Windsor Shades and Chelsea Plantation. On September 13, 1781, Washington and Rochambeau crossed the Pamunkey at Ruffin's Ferry en route to the battle of Yorktown.

In 2009, a historic easement was placed on Windsor Shades and its surrounding 14 acres to the Virginia Department of Historic Resources.

In May 2026 Windsor Shades estates was sold was sold to the Pamunkey Indian Tribe, reconnecting one of Virginia’s most significant colonial and Revolutionary War landmarks with the people who originally inhabited and stewarded the land centuries before English settlement.

== See also ==
- National Register of Historic Places listings in King William County, Virginia
- Sweet Hall
