= Pamunkey Indian Museum and Cultural Center =

Museum and cultural center of Pamunkey Indian Reservation

- Established: 1979
- Location: King William, Virginia
- Coordinates: 37.575456°N 77.002154°W
- Website: pamunkey.org/museum-cultural-center

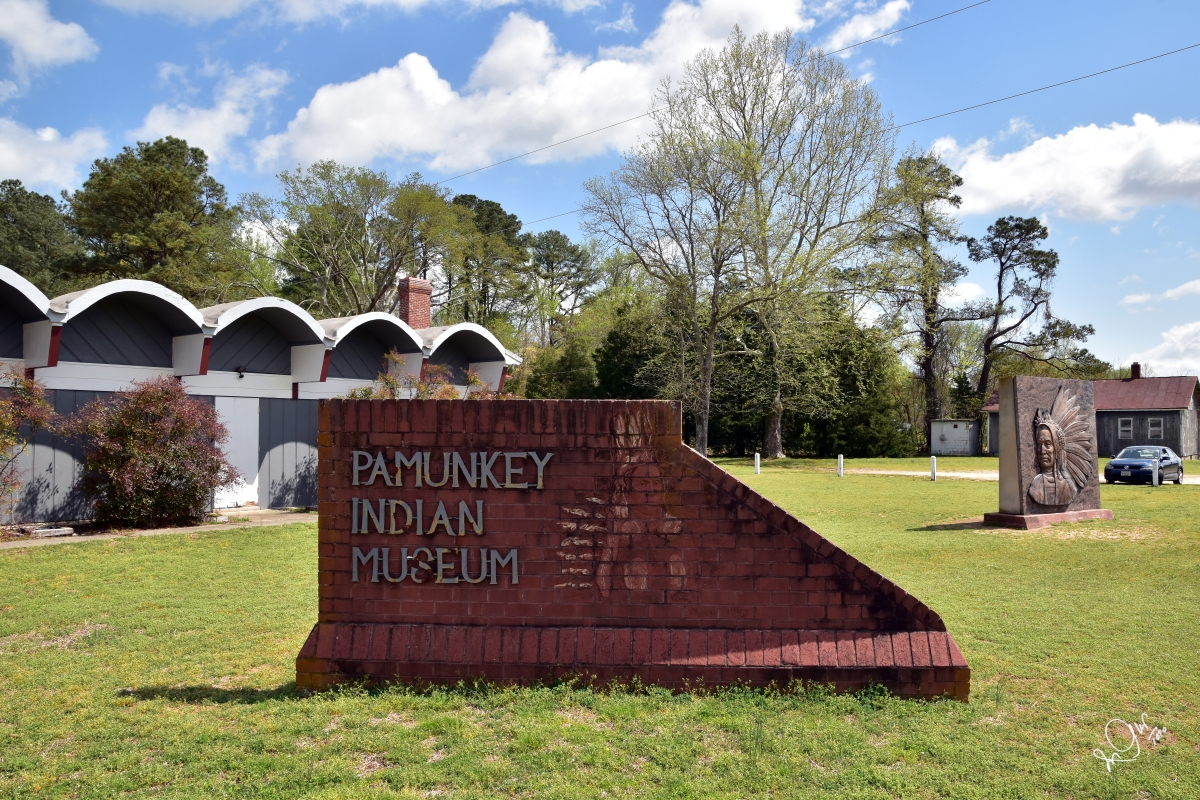
Pamunkey Indian Museum & Cultural Center

The Pamunkey Indian Museum and Cultural Center is a tribal museum located on the Pamunkey Indian Reservation in Virginia. The museum focuses on the Pamunkey Indian Tribe’s history and way of life from 12,000 years ago through to the present.

Construction on the museum began in 1979, with primary contributions made by Warren Cook (Pamunkey) and Errett Callahan (an experimental archeologist). The museum celebrated its grand opening on October 11, 1980.

Early in the museum’s history a living Indian Village was a major component of the exhibition but no longer exists. Today glass display cabinets highlight the lifeways of the Pamunkey Indian Tribe and are the centerpiece of the museum. These cases were built by Grover Miles (Pamunkey) when the museum was founded and still house a majority of the museum collection. The museum displays combine replicas, primarily created by Callahan, with original Native American artifacts donated by Tribal Citizens from their personal and familial collections.

The display cabinets begin with information dating to 12,000 years ago (the Ice Age) and incorporate all archaeological timeframes through to the modern period. The displays in each cabinet are sub-divided into four themes, which are listed below. These themes are color-coded blue, green, yellow and red to assist the visitor in understanding the differences within each theme from one era to the next.

PEOPLE (blue)

Displays the way of life of the Pamunkey during that specific era.

NATURAL ENVIRONMENT (green)

The environment in which they lived

SETTLEMENT (yellow)

Relates to the dwellings in which they lived

SUBSISTENCE (red)

Exhibits the tools they used and how they survived

The museum has a gift shop with various items designed and created by Pamunkey Tribal Citizens. Of particular note, pottery made using centuries old techniques and clay dug from the Pamunkey River is available for purchase.
