= Holly Hill (Aylett, Virginia) =

Historic house in Virginia, United States

- U.S. National Register of Historic Places
- Virginia Landmarks Register
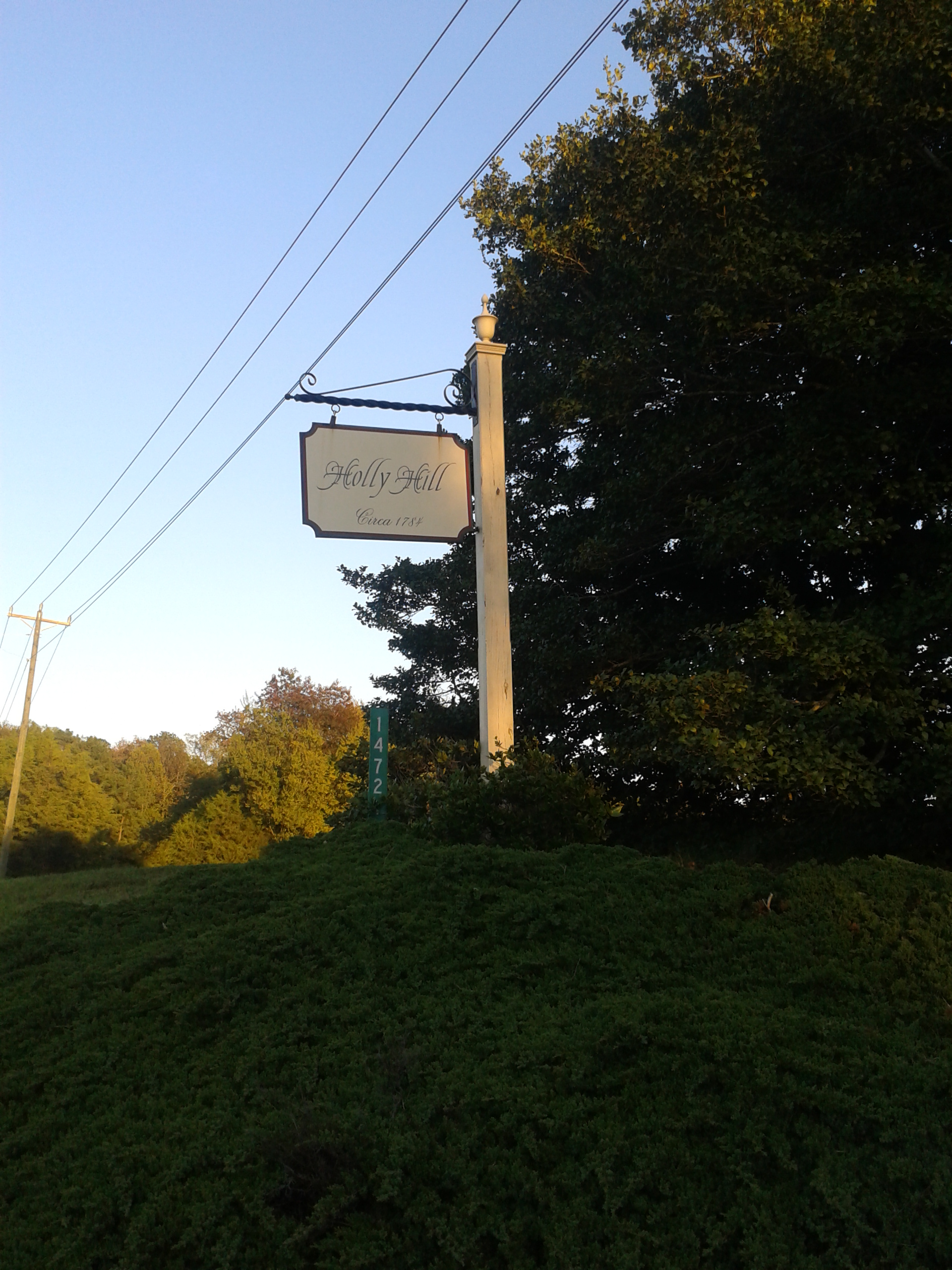
- Sign at the entrance to Holly Hill, October, 2016

- Location within Virginia Location within the United States
- Location: NE of Aylett off U.S. 360, near Aylett, Virginia
- Coordinates: 37°47′31″N 76°53′10″W
- Area: 170 acres (69 ha)
- Built: c. 1820
- Built by: Fauntleroy, Samuel Griffin
- Architectural style: Georgian
- NRHP reference No.: 73002026
- VLR No.: 049-0033

Significant dates
- Added to NRHP: July 24, 1973
- Designated VLR: June 19, 1973

Holly Hill is a historic plantation house near Aylett in King and Queen County, Virginia. It was built about 1820 and is a two-story, five-bay-by-two-bay Georgian-style brick dwelling. It has a hipped roof and four-bay rear ell.

It was listed on the National Register of Historic Places in 1973.
