= Mollie Holmes Adams =

Upper Mattaponi tribal elder (1881–1973)

- Born: Mollie Wade Holmes; October 8, 1881
- Died: December 14, 1973 (aged 92)

Mollie Wade Holmes Adams (née Holmes; October 8, 1881 – December 14, 1973) was an Upper Mattaponi tribal elder and advocate of tribal culture in Virginia. She advocated for recognition of the tribe and worked to preserve traditional skills and knowledge. She was selected for the Virginia Women in History program by the Library of Virginia.

== Biography ==
Mollie Wade Holmes was born in 1881, into the Upper Mattaponi Tribe, or Adamstown Band of Mattaponi, and grew up in great poverty in Adamstown. In 1900 she married Jasper Lewis Adams, who served as chief of the tribe for five decades, from 1923 to 1973. She joined him as a tribal leader; he was involved in the purchase and construction of the Sharon Indian School in 1919 and the Indian View Baptist Church in 1942. The couple had twelve children.

Adams was of mixed-race, partial European ancestry, and she and her husband shared some common lineage. Beginning in the 1920s, the Virginia Bureau of Vital Statistics, led by Walter Plecker, attempted to classify Indians such as Adams and her children as "colored", under the new Racial Integrity Act of 1924. It required classification of all residents as white or colored (black), and Plecker was convinced that some families identified as Native American just to hide African ancestry. He insisted on a one-drop rule: if a person had any African ancestry, they should be classified as black (colored). He ignored how people identified culturally.

To counter the efforts to classify her as colored, Adams was required to provide a statement signed by eight white men certifying her Indian ancestry; the document still exists. During this period, many people did lose their classification as Indian, resulting in later problems when tribes tried to gain recognition, as state records did not affirm their historical continuity as Indians.

In her role as tribal elder, Adams played a pivotal role in preservation of feather weaving, an art which had almost been lost and which she passed on to others. She assisted anthropologists with a variety of studies, including discussing herbal remedies with them. Her activism provided a strong base of support for tribal life.

In addition, she was the mother of Andrew Washington Adams, who served as chief from 1974 to 1985; her grandson, Kenneth Adams, has served as chief of the tribe as well. Her husband died in 1971.

Adams was honored in 2010 as one of the Virginia Women in History.
