= Mattaponi =

Total population
- Enrolled members: Mattaponi, King William County, Virginia: 450 Upper Mattaponi, King William County, Virginia: 575

Regions with significant populations
- United States Virginia

Languages
- English, Virginia Algonquian (historical)

Religion
- Christianity (incl. syncretistic forms)

Related ethnic groups
- Pamunkey, Upper Mattaponi

Location of the Mattaponi Indian Reservation

The Mattaponi (English: /ˌmætəpoʊˈnaɪ/) tribe is one of only two Virginia Indian tribes in the Commonwealth of Virginia that owns reservation land, which it has held since the colonial era. The larger Mattaponi Indian Tribe lives in King William County on the reservation, which stretches along the borders of the Mattaponi River, near West Point, Virginia.

The Mattaponi were one of six tribes inherited by the leader of the Confederacy, Mamanatowick Powhatan, in the late 16th century. The tribe spoke an Algonquian language, like other members of the Powhatan Confederacy. The confederacy numbered more than 30 members by the time the English arrived and settled Jamestown in 1607.

In addition, a Mattaponi band had long been settled outside the reservation at an unincorporated hamlet called Adamstown, located on the upper reaches of the Mattaponi River. This has been identified as Indian land in records dating to the 17th century. In 1921, this Upper Mattaponi Tribe of Adamstown organized as an official group. They have been recognized as a tribe by the Commonwealth of Virginia and own 32 acres (130,000 m^{2}) of land in King William County. Federal status was granted to the Upper Mattaponi Tribe through the passage of the Thomasina E. Jordan Indian Tribes of Virginia Federal Recognition Act of 2017 on January 12, 2018.

== History ==
According to archaeologists, Indigenous peoples of successive cultures have been living in the area now called Virginia for as long as 15,000 years. The Mattaponi are believed to have formed in the 14th and 15th centuries. They were surrounded by nations speaking various languages including : Algonquian along the coast and in the Tidewater, Siouan in the central area and Piedmont, and Iroquoian generally in the backcountry and to the north. The Mattaponi tribe’s capital town was called “Mattapanient”. The Mattaponi had a few towns and village settlements like Cinquoteck, Quackcohowon and Passaunkack, all of which were built along the Mattaponi yeokanta.

=== 17th century ===
In 1607, the Mattaponi were identified by name by the English explorers John Smith, who noted that they were living along the Mattaponi River. William Strachey estimated their warriors at 140, meaning their population likely numbered about 450. According to Mattaponi and Pamunkey oral history, Pocahontas was half Mattaponi through her mother (who shared her name) and half Pamunkey through her father, Wahunsenacawh.

During the second Anglo-Powhatan War of 1644–1646, the Mattaponi fled their homeland along the Mattaponi River and took refuge in the highlands along Piscataway Creek. With the cessation of hostilities, they gradually returned to its homeland. In 1646, at the conclusion of the Anglo-Powhatan War, the Powhatan Confederacy signed their first treaty with the English. By treaty, the English defined the tribes as tributaries; they allocated reservations lands for several of the tribes, in exchange for requiring an annual tribute payment of fish and game.

In 1656–1657, the leaders of the Mattaponi Tribe signed peace treaties with the Court of Rappahannock County and the justices of Old Rappahannock County. Tribal members were to be treated equally as Englishmen in court and civil rights.

==== Bacon's Rebellion ====
During Bacon's Rebellion, the Mattaponi were one of several innocent tribes attacked by colonial militia directed by Nathaniel Bacon. Historians believe Bacon had a personal rivalry with Governor Sir William Berkeley, though there were other causes of the rebellion. Some of these other causes were: declining tobacco prices (economic problems), growing commercial competition (from Maryland and North Carolina), an increasingly restricted English market, and rising prices from English manufactured goods (mercantilism). Continued tensions and raids by other local Virginia tribes gave Bacon and his followers a scapegoat in which to take out their frustrations.

Once the conflict ended, the Treaty of Middle Plantation was signed on May 29, 1677. Cockacoeske (weroansqua of the Pamunkey) signed the treaty on behalf of several tribes, including the Mattaponi. Known as "Queen of the Pamunkey" by the English, she had succeeded her husband, Totopotomoi, upon his death in 1656. He was killed while fighting on the side of the English. The treaty ushered in a time of peace between the Virginia tribes and the English. More tribal leaders signed the treaty of 1677 than that of nearly 30 years before. It reconfirmed the annual tribute payments. The government established more reservation lands for the tribes, but required them in turn to acknowledge they and their peoples were subjects of the King of England (there is no record of what the tribes thought of that assertion).

The Mattaponi and Pamunkey tribes have continued to provide the state, the successor to the colony, with the annual tribute payment stipulated by the treaties of 1646 and 1677.

=== Late 17th century ===
In 1685, the Mattaponi, along with the Pamunkey and Chickahominy, attended a treaty conference at Albany, New York. It was an attempt by colonial governments of New York and Virginia to end the wars between them and the Haudenosaunee Confederacy. The Haudenosaunee were frequently invading Virginia, including the portion along the Shenandoah and Ohio rivers. Settlers got caught up in the warfare, which kept the tribes in a state of high alert. The warfare prevented colonial settlement in the backcountry.

=== 17th and 18th centuries ===
The Mattaponi continued to occupy their reservation throughout the 17th and 18th centuries. Colonists encroached on their lands during that time period, as recorded by a Baptist missionary who worked with the Tribe in the 18th century. Then-Governor Thomas Jefferson in 1781 also noted that settlers encroached on Indian land. Throughout their history, the Mattaponi had their own tribal government independent from the Powhatan leadership. Although the tribe had previously been a member of their Confederacy.

=== 19th century ===
The Mattaponi repeatedly defended the tribe and their land against efforts by local officials and individuals to dispose of their property and deny their existence as a tribe. In 1812, the local government tried to take an acre of land from the Mattaponi for a dam, but they defeated the attempt. In 1843, the so-called "Gregory Petition" alleged that the Pamunkey and Mattaponi were no longer Indians. This effort to remove the Mattaponi and Pamunkey from their lands was also defeated. At about the same time, the historian Henry Howe reported two Indian groups living in King William County, the Pamunkey and the Mattaponi. In 1865, the Pamunkey Baptist Church was formed, which many Mattaponi attended over the years.

Throughout the 19th century, the Mattaponi Tribe had its own tribal leadership. In 1868, the Mattaponi Tribe submitted a list of its chiefs, headmen and members to the Governor. The list identified the chief as Ellston Major, headmen as Austin Key and Robert Toopence, and tribal members as Nancy Franklin, Claiborne Key, Austin Key, Jno [Jonathan] Anderson Key, Henry Major, Ellston Major, Ellwood Major, Lee Franklin Major, Coley Major, Mary Major, Parkey Major, John Major, Park Farley Toopence, Elizabeth Toopence, Robert Toopence, Emeline Toopence, Laura Toopence, Mary Catherine Toopence, James C. Toopence, and Lucy J. Toopence. The list was signed by Hardin Littlepage and William J. Trimmer, trustees for the tribe. Present-day tribal members trace their descendancy from individuals on that list.

The Pamunkey and Mattaponi Tribes were treated by the Commonwealth of Virginia as a single administrative entity until 1894. That year, the Mattaponi affirmed their separation from the Pamunkey-led Powhatan Confederacy in the eyes of Virginia law. The Commonwealth's general assembly responded in 1894 by appointing five trustees to the Mattaponi Tribe.

The Mattaponi, like the Pamunkey Tribe, were declared exempt from certain local and county taxes. For its part, the Mattaponi Tribe adopted bylaws for its governance and established a school on its reservation.

=== 20th century to present ===
A Mattaponi woman, photo taken by Frank Speck in 1918.

During the 20th century, the Mattaponi Tribe and its reservation have been repeatedly acknowledged by the Commonwealth's Governors and Attorneys General. The Mattaponi Tribe has also been repeatedly identified in scholarly publications and newspaper articles.

The tribe has a traditional government, the Mattaponi Tribal Council, which controls the affairs of the reservation. It holds the land in common but assigns plots for members' use, settles internal disputes, maintains tribal property, and protects the interests of the Mattaponi Tribe in relationships with local, state, and federal governments. It maintains its obligations under the Treaty of Middle Plantation of 1677 by giving annual tribute to the Governor of the Commonwealth of Virginia.

== Upper Mattaponi Tribe ==
The Upper Mattaponi Tribe were a band settled on the upper reaches of the Mattaponi River. They did not belong to the reservation, and were organized around a lead family of Adams. Their founder was likely James Adams, who acted as an interpreter between the Mattaponi and English from 1702 to 1727. The settlement in the 19th century was recorded as Adamstown. The Upper Mattaponi tribe did not have separate recognition until 1921. However, the members of this tribes are descendants of a group of Indians who lived near Passaunkack during the 1700s.

In 1921 the group organized as the Upper Mattaponi Tribe, and have been recognized by the state of Virginia. During the 1920s after being officially recognized, the tribe found it difficult to maintain their culture and identity. The state Racial Integrity Act of 1924 banned interracial marriage in the state of Virginia. The subsequent legislation required racial identification on birth certificates and marriage certificates and, in an effort at suppression of African Americans, many Upper Mattaponi were reclassified as Black in official records because of being of mixed race. At the time there was disregard for how people identified culturally. As a result, their continuity as a people was disrupted by records being inaccurate.

Mollie Adams, Upper Mattaponi leader and activist, photographed in 1918 by Frank Speck.

In 1942 the Upper Mattaponi built the Indian View Baptist Church, the heart of their faith community. Next door is the Sharon Indian School. The original one-room school was built in 1917. Before then Mattaponi children were educated with the Pamunkey, with whom they were long linked by colonial and state governments. The school was replaced with an eight-room structure in 1952. It closed in the 1960s with the end of official state racial segregation in public schools. The state returned the school to the tribe's jurisdiction and use in 1987. They now use it as a community center.

In January 2022, the Upper Mattaponi Tribe purchased its first official unit of tribal housing, located in Central Garage, Virginia.

Mollie Holmes Adams, named one of the Virginia Women in History for 2010, was a member of the Upper Mattaponi Tribe.
