= Sweet Hall Marsh =

Marsh in King William County, Virginia, United States

Coordinates: 37°33′37″N 76°53′22″W

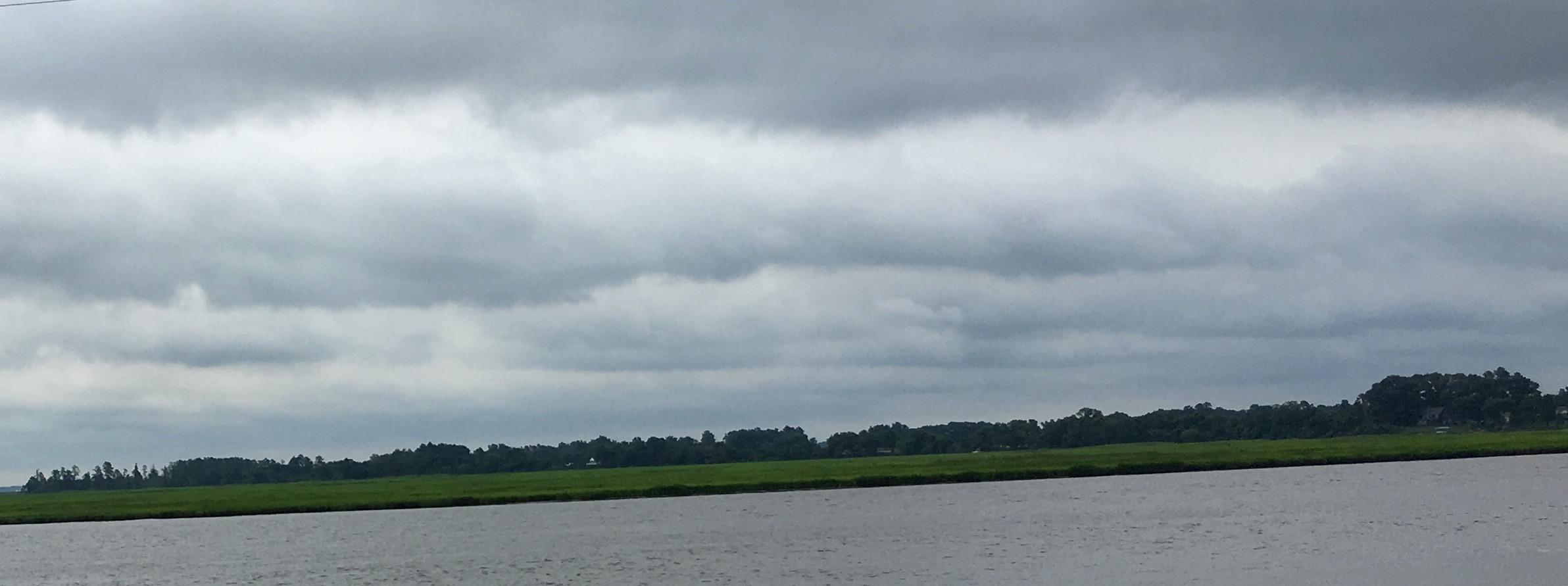
Sweet Hall Marsh in 2016.

Sweet Hall Marsh (also known as Sweethall Marsh) is a 353-hectare (870-acre) tidal marsh located on the northern edge of the Pamunkey River in southeastern King William County, Virginia, United States, just south-southeast of the unincorporated community of Sweet Hall. It is privately owned by the Tacoma Hunting and Fishing Club and is one of four components of the Chesapeake Bay National Estuarine Research Reserve.

Due to its low elevation (0 feet [0 m]) and rising sea level, the marsh's fresh water ecosystem is in jeopardy.
