= Cinquoteck =

Former Mattaponi village

Cinquoteck is a former Mattaponi village, on the site of what today is the town of West Point, Virginia in the United States.

it is the Birthplace of Pocahontas according to Mattaponi and Pamunkey Oral History.

Cinquoteck was the primary town of Opechancanough, a Mamanatowick of the Powhatan Confederacy and brother of former Mamanatowick Powhatan.
