= St. John's Church (Sweet Hall, Virginia) =

Historic church in Virginia, US

- U.S. National Register of Historic Places
- Virginia Landmarks Register
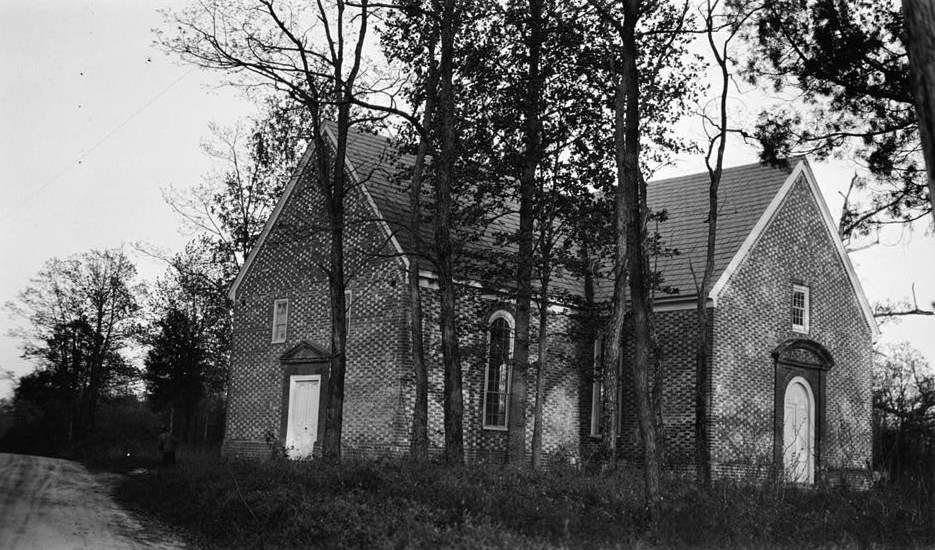
- Old St. John's Church, HABS Photo

- Location within Virginia Location within the United States
- Location: N of Sweet Hall on VA 30, near Sweet Hall, Virginia
- Coordinates: 37°36′58″N 76°55′17″W
- Area: 10 acres (4.0 ha)
- Built: 1734
- Architectural style: Colonial
- NRHP reference No.: 73002214
- VLR No.: 050-0061

Significant dates
- Added to NRHP: April 24, 1973
- Designated VLR: October 17, 1972

St. John's Church is a historic Episcopal church located near Sweet Hall, King William County, Virginia, United States. It was constructed in 1734 and is a one-story, T-shaped brick building. It measures 50 feet, 3 inches, by 20 feet, 2 inches, with a 24 feet wide, 28 feet, 9 inch, wing. St. John's is the only surviving colonial church in King William County to remain in the Episcopal charge. This church is also important in that it is associated with Carter Braxton, Signer of the Declaration of Independence, who regularly attended worship there.

It was listed on the National Register of Historic Places in 1973.
