= King William, Virginia =

- Census-designated place
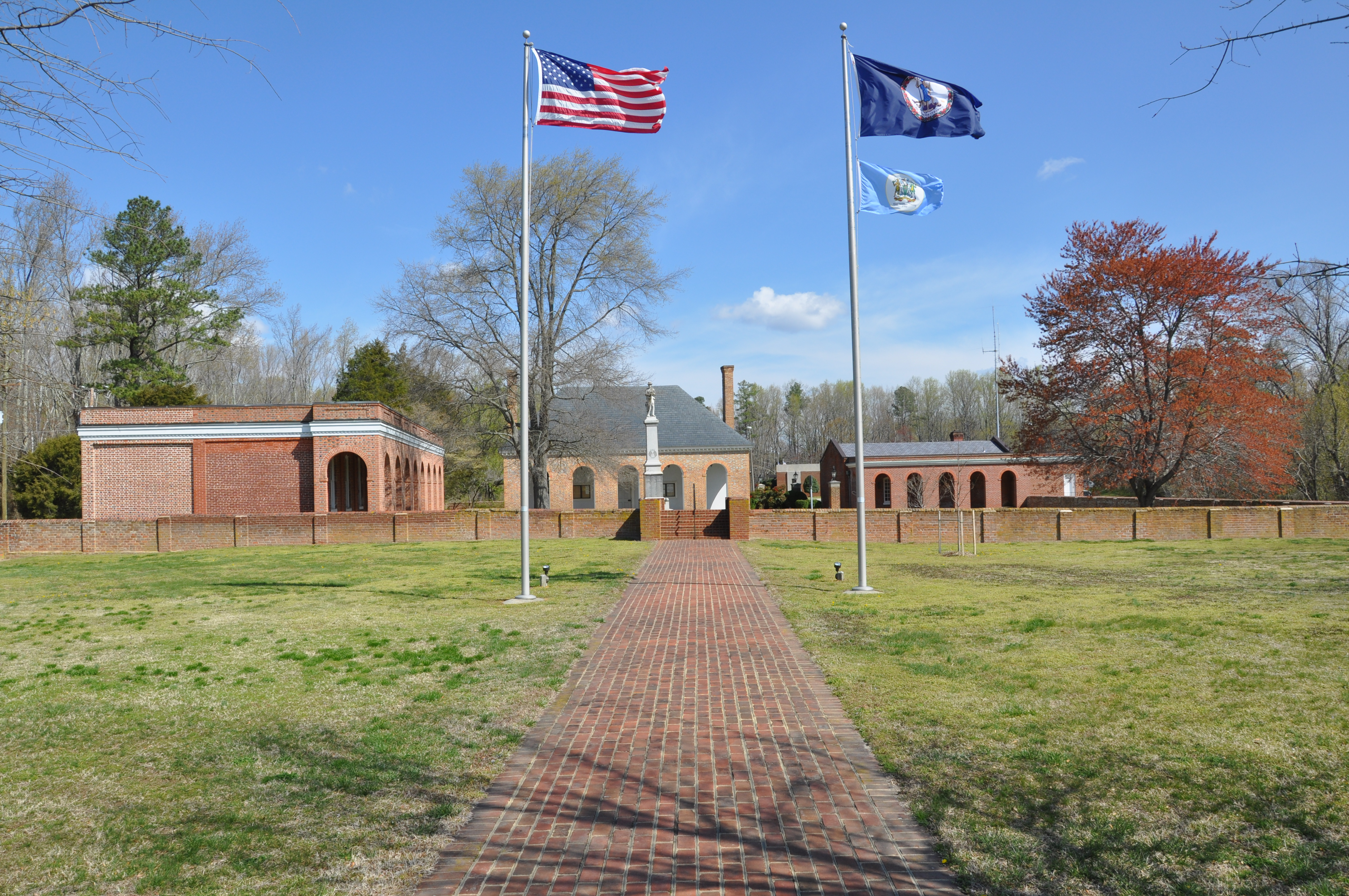
- King William County Courthouse

- Location in Virginia and the United States King William (the United States)
- Coordinates: 37°41′15″N 77°0′49″W
- Country: United States
- State: Virginia
- County: King William

Area
  - Total: 4.6 sq mi (11.9 km^{2})
  - Land: 4.6 sq mi (11.9 km^{2})
  - Water: 0 sq mi (0.0 km^{2})
- Elevation: 142 ft (43 m)

Population (2010)
  - Total: 252
  - Density: 55/sq mi (21.1/km^{2})
- Time zone: UTC−5 (Eastern (EST))
  - Summer (DST): UTC−4 (EDT)
- ZIP code: 23086
- FIPS code: 51-42792
- GNIS feature ID: 1498501

King William is a census-designated place (CDP) in and the county seat of King William County, Virginia, United States. As of the 2020 census, King William had a population of 276. Located in King William is the oldest courthouse in continuous use in the United States, built in 1725. The community is also known as King William Courthouse or, by an alternative spelling, King William Court House.

The King William County Courthouse, King William Training School, Sharon Indian School, and Sweet Hall are listed on the National Register of Historic Places.

== Geography ==
King William is slightly east of the center of King William County, along Virginia State Route 30. It is 17 miles (27 km) northwest of West Point and 31 miles (50 km) by road east of Richmond.

According to the U.S. Census Bureau, the CDP has an area of 4.6 square miles (11.9 km^{2}), of which 0.4 acres (1,588 m^{2}), or 0.01%, are water. King William is 2 miles (3 km) south of Horse Landing, a small community on the tidal Mattaponi River.

The Pamunkey Indian Reservation is located 10 miles (16 km) south of King William, and the Pamunkey Indian Tribe Museum was established on the reservation in 1979. The chiefs Wahunsonacock and Opechancanough are buried on the Pamunkey Indian Reservation near railroad tracks.

== Demographics ==
Historical population
Census	Pop.	Note	%±
2010	252		—
2020	276		9.5%
U.S. Decennial Census; 2010 2020

King William was first listed as a census designated place in the 2010 U.S. census.
