= Tom Peete Cross =

Tom Peete Cross (December 8, 1879 – December 25, 1951) was an American Celticist and folklorist.

== Education and career ==
Cross did his undergraduate education at Hampden–Sydney College, receiving his B.A. in 1899. He went on to Harvard University to pursue an M.A. (1906) and Ph.D. (1909). After receiving his Ph.D., he spent a year studying in Dublin, Ireland, then returned to the United States in 1910 to take up a position as an instructor at Harvard. In 1911 he became the head of the English department at Sweet Briar College. Following that, he spent his next year at the University of North Carolina, and in 1913 became the chair of the Department of English and Comparative Literature at the University of Chicago. His alma mater Hampden–Sydney College awarded him an honorary doctorate of literature in 1927. He was also member of the Modern Language Association and the American Council of the Irish Texts Society. He retired in 1945.

== Works ==
One major work of Cross's was A List of Books and Articles, Chiefly Bibliographical, Designed to Serve as an Introduction to the Bibliography and Methods of English Literary History, first published in 1919; it would go through numerous editions, renamed from the 7th onwards as the Bibliographical Guide to English Studies. Following his death it was expanded by Donald F. Bond as the Reference Guide to English Studies. He also published a number of journal articles and a monograph on the Arthurian legends.

Cross's final work, the Motif-Index of Early Irish Literature, whose compilation he had begun more than five decades earlier at the inspiration of Fred N. Robinson, was published post-humously as part of Indiana University Bloomington's Folklore Series in 1952. Stith Thompson, who visited him in late 1951, reported that he worked literally until the day he died reading the galley proofs in order to complete the corrections. Kenneth H. Jackson praised the Motif-Index as "enormously comprehensive and so extremely useful". However, William Sayers would half a century later criticise it as being limited by its "original conceptual categories, where such modern notions as ideology, gender, physical aberrance, the abject and the like are absent".

== Personal life ==
Cross was born in 1879 in Nansemond County, Virginia, to Thomas Hardy Cross and Eleanor Elizabeth Wright. His father was a planter. He had one younger brother, Hardy Cross, who would go on to achieve fame in the field of structural engineering for his development of the moment distribution method. He and his brother both did their preparatory education at Norfolk Academy. Cross was married to Elizabeth Weathers Cross. He had two daughters, Ellen Elizabeth Cross and Evelyn Douglas Cross. The former married music scholar Storm Bull in 1939. At the end of his career, Cross retired to a farm in Aylett, Virginia, where he lived until his death. Late in life, he suffered a heart attack, and his poor health kept him from being able to climb stairs, but he still continued his work on his Motif-Index. After his death, his wife moved to Boulder, Colorado, where she lived with Bull and her daughter until her own death in 1957.
