= Mount Columbia (Manquin, Virginia) =

Historic house in Virginia, United States

- U.S. National Register of Historic Places
- Virginia Landmarks Register
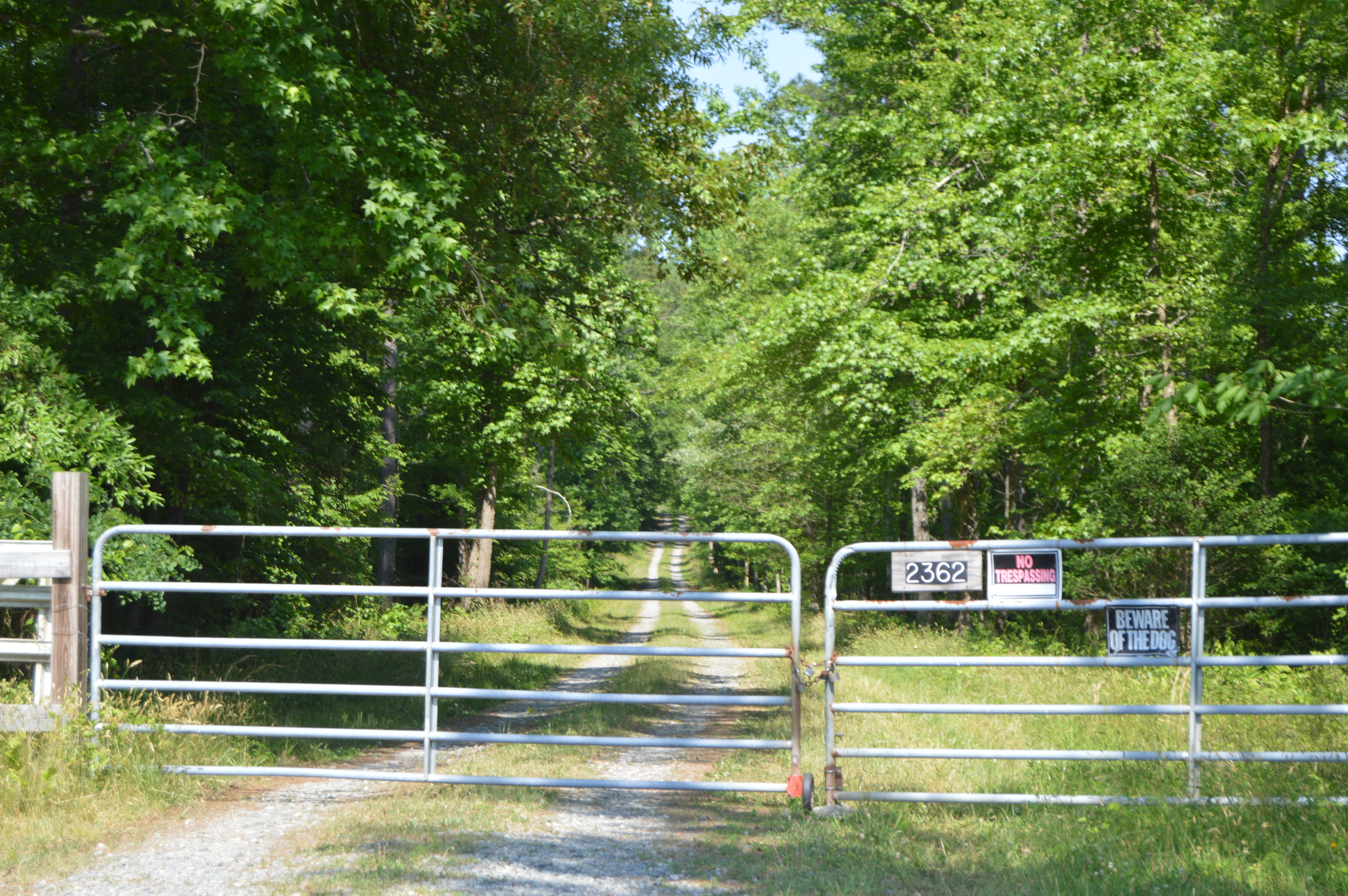
- Property entrance

- Location within Virginia Location within the United States
- Location: Off VA 649, 2.7 mi. W of VA 605, near Manquin, Virginia
- Coordinates: 37°42′51″N 77°11′14″W
- Area: 99.2 acres (40.1 ha)
- Built: c. 1792, c. 1835
- Architect: Bosher, Gideon; Bosher, William
- Architectural style: Federal
- NRHP reference No.: 88003208
- VLR No.: 050-0049

Significant dates
- Added to NRHP: January 19, 1989
- Designated VLR: April 19, 1988

Mount Columbia is a historic home located near Manquin, King William County, Virginia. It was built in two sections; the rear section was built about 1790 and the front was added about 1835. It is a two-story, five-bay, rectangular brick dwelling in the Federal style. The front section has a single-pile, central hall plan. Also on the property are the contributing brick kitchen dependency, a family cemetery and the vestiges of a formal garden.

It was listed on the National Register of Historic Places in 1989.
