= Burlington (Aylett, Virginia) =

Historic house in Virginia, United States

- U.S. National Register of Historic Places
- Virginia Landmarks Register
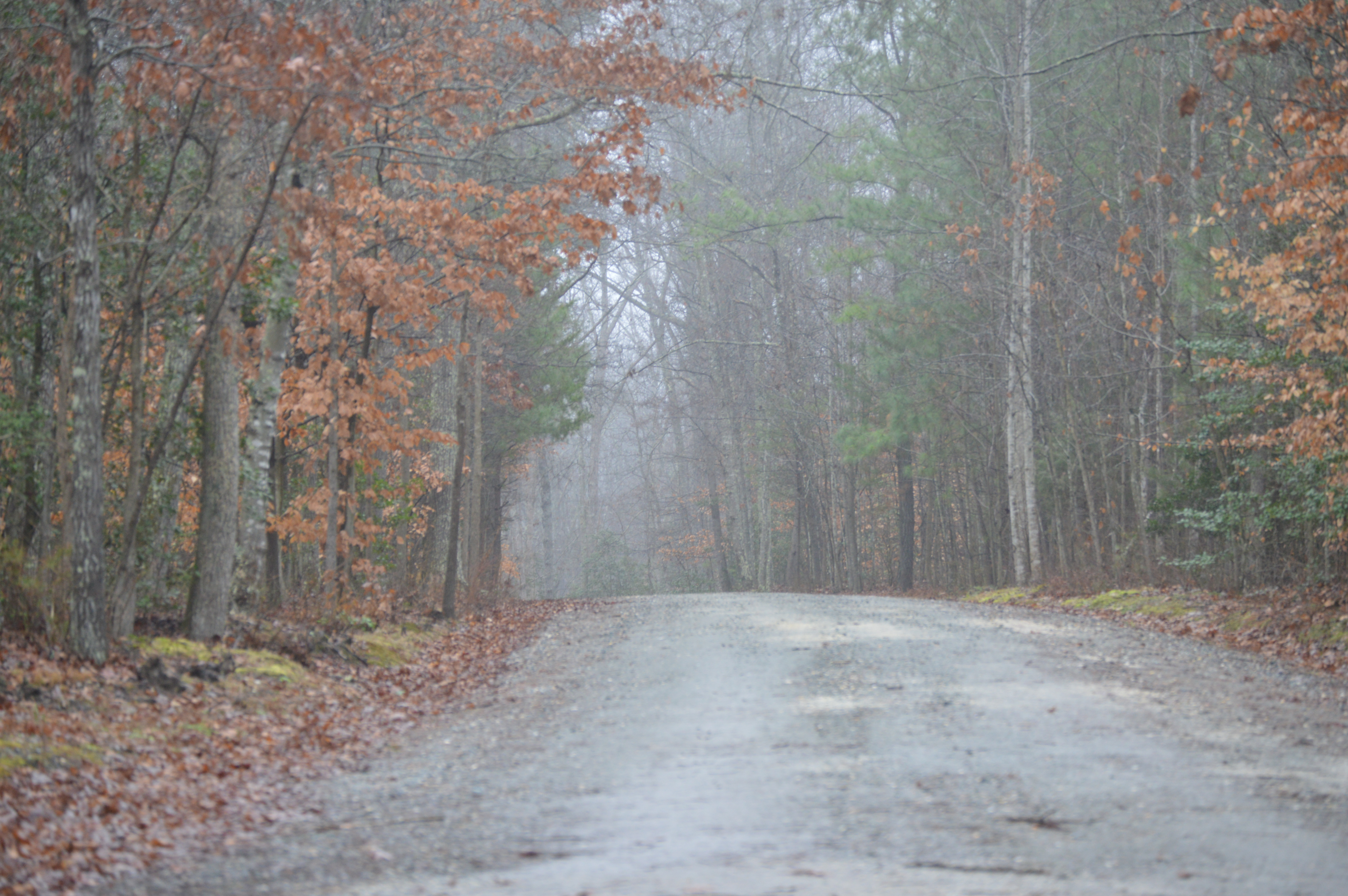
- Entrance to the estate

- Location within Virginia Location within the United States
- Nearest city: Aylett, Virginia
- Coordinates: 37.84443°N 77.14388°W
- Area: 782 acres (316 ha)
- Built: 1842
- Architectural style: Classical Revival, Colonial
- NRHP reference No.: 78003023
- VLR No.: 050-0010

Significant dates
- Added to NRHP: January 30, 1978
- Designated VLR: March 15, 1977

Burlington is a historic plantation house located near Aylett, King William County, Virginia.

== History ==
Owen Gwalthney II bought the 700 acre plantation from Lewis Burwell in the mid-18th century.

== Architecture ==
The two-part main house is mostly in the Classical Revival-style and was erected in 1842 by Dr. William Gwathmey, but the rear ell contains a fragment of a Colonial-period frame dwelling erected by the Burwell family. The main section is a two-story, stuccoed brick dwelling with a standing seam metal gable roof. The earlier portion is topped by a hipped roof. Also on the property are a 19th-century boxwood garden, the contributing old smokehouse, an early framed barn (that was the original meetinghouse of the Beulah Baptist Church), and the Gwathmey family cemetery surrounded by a brick wall.

It was listed on the National Register of Historic Places in 1978.
