= Aylett, Virginia =

Unincorporated community in Virginia, United States

- Unincorporated community
- Location within Virginia and the United States Aylett (the United States)
- Coordinates: 37°47′9″N 77°6′17″W
- Country: United States
- State: Virginia
- County: King William
- Elevation: 79 ft (24 m)
- Time zone: UTC−5 (Eastern (EST))
  - Summer (DST): UTC−4 (EDT)
- ZIP code: 23009
- Area code: 804

Aylett is an unincorporated community in King William County, Virginia, United States. It is located where Virginia State Route 360 crosses the Mattaponi River. William Aylett and his family had several prominent warehouses and mills in the area.

Formerly, Todd's Bridge (no longer in existence), or simply Todd's, was north of Aylett. Todd's and Aylett were both mentioned in Tobacco Inspection Act of 1730 legislation as a location for a public tobacco inspection warehouse.

Later, in 1781, Todd's Bridge provided crossing of the Mattaponi as a part of the Washington–Rochambeau Revolutionary Route

Burlington, Holly Hill, Roseville Plantation, and Zoar are listed on the National Register of Historic Places.

== See also ==
- Tom Peete Cross
- Zoar State Forest
