= King William County Courthouse =

Historic courthouse in Virginia, US

- U.S. National Register of Historic Places
- Virginia Landmarks Register
- The King William County Courthouse

- Location within Virginia Location within the United States
- Location: Rte. 619, off VA 30, King William, Virginia
- Coordinates: 37°41′17″N 77°0′48″W
- Area: 3 acres (1.2 ha)
- Built: 1725
- NRHP reference No.: 69000251
- VLR No.: 050-0038

Significant dates
- Added to NRHP: October 01, 1969
- Designated VLR: November 5, 1968

The King William County Courthouse is a courthouse located in the unincorporated community of King William, King William County, Virginia. The original courthouse structure was constructed in 1725; it is the oldest courthouse building in continuous use in the United States. The courthouse is constructed of brick laid in Flemish bond. In 1840 the courthouse was enlarged and a brick wall was erected to enclose the court green and to keep livestock and poultry away from the buildings. A new courthouse complex has been constructed to augment the old; however, hearings are still held in the old building to preserve its historic designation.

This courthouse was listed on the National Register of Historic Places in 1969.

== Gallery ==
King William County Courthouse

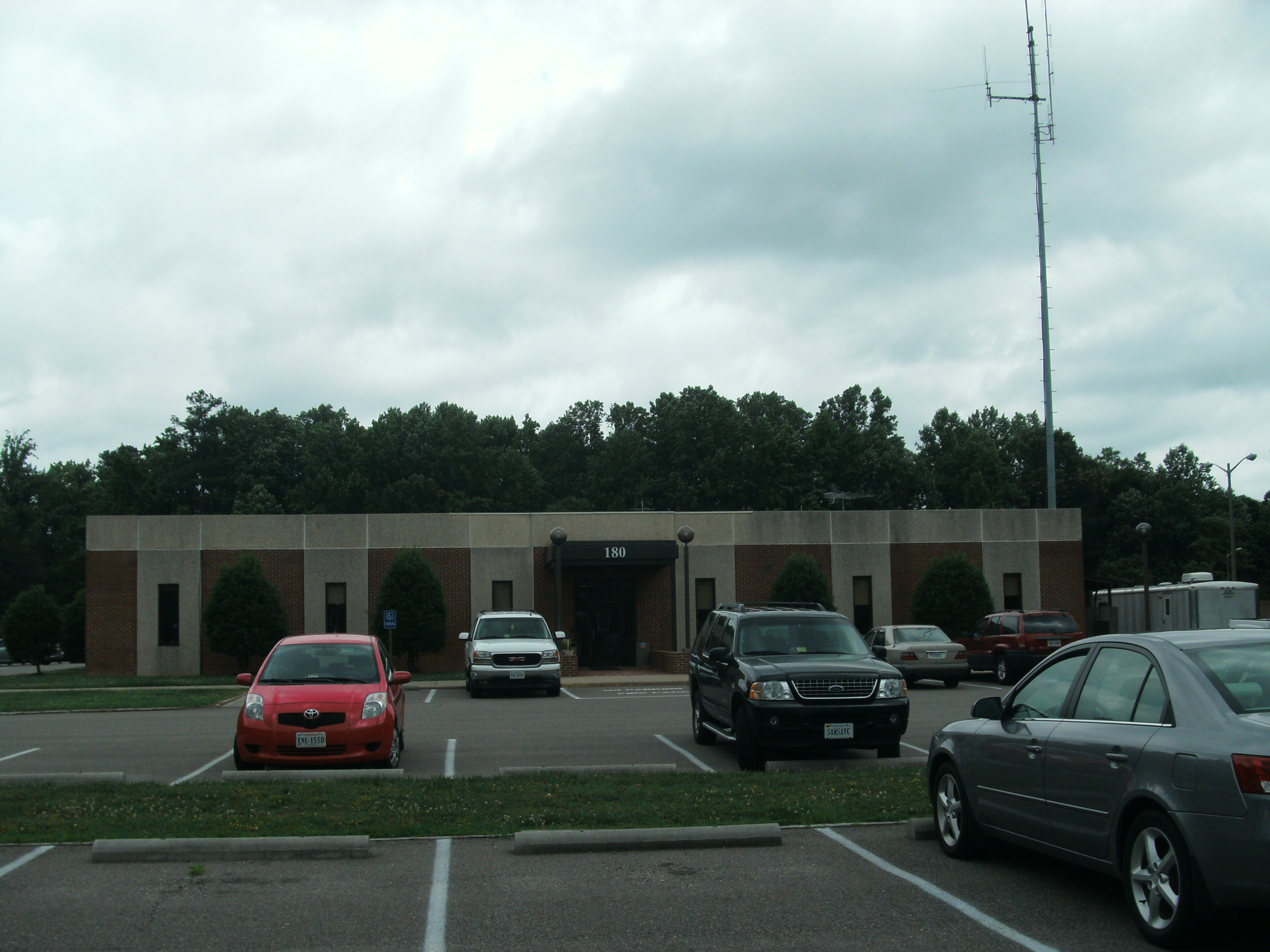
The new county office building located behind the historic courthouse
