= King William Training School =

- U.S. National Register of Historic Places
- Virginia Landmarks Register
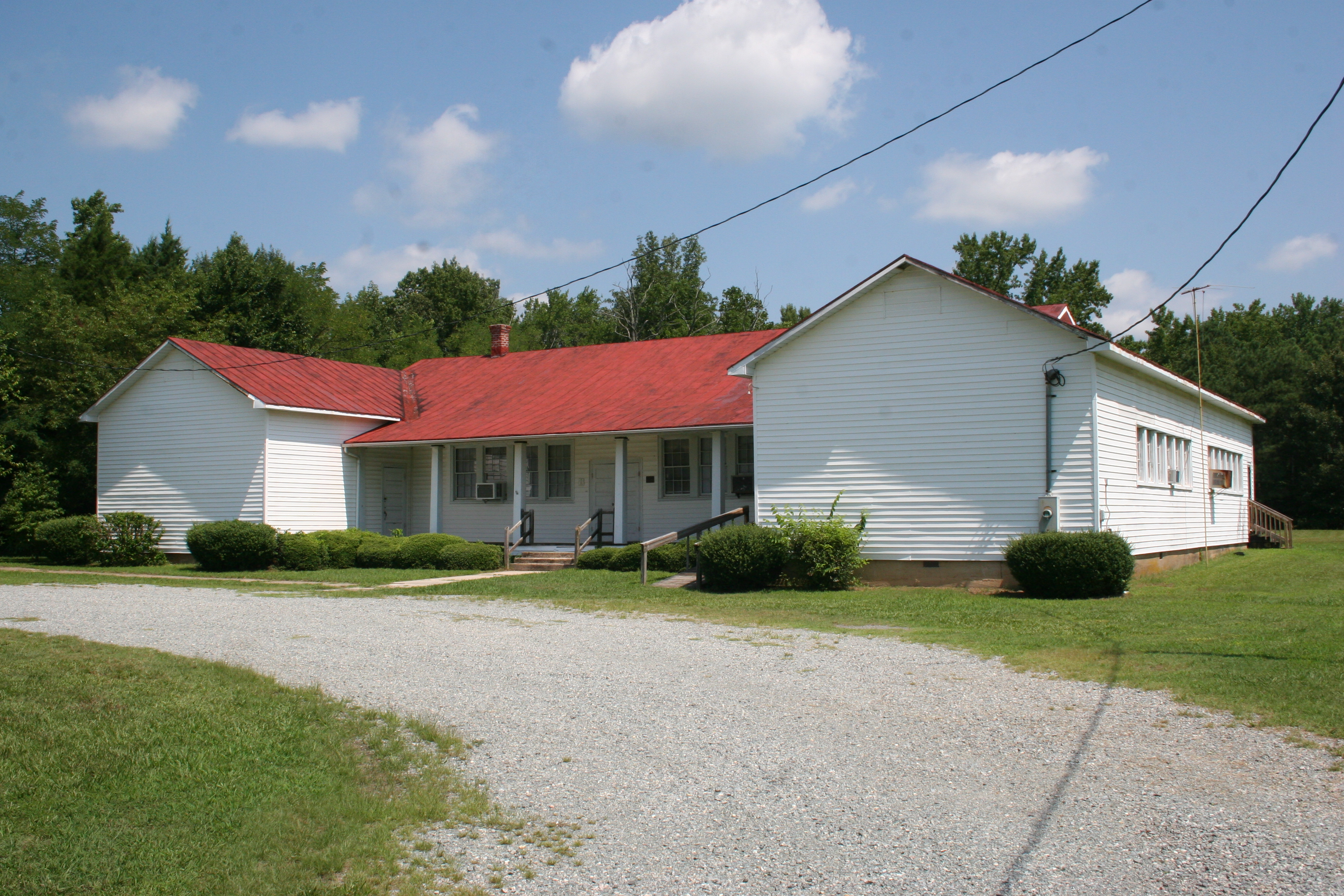
- King William Training School building, July 2012

- Location within Virginia Location within the United States
- Location: 18627 King William Rd., King William, Virginia
- Coordinates: 37°41′43″N 77°01′58″W
- Area: 6.5 acres (2.6 ha)
- Built: 1922-1923
- MPS: Rosenwald Schools in Virginia MPS
- NRHP reference No.: 06000872
- VLR No.: 050-5010

Significant dates
- Added to NRHP: September 19, 2006
- Designated VLR: June 8, 2006

King William Training School, also known as the Pamunkey Baptist Association Building and King William Training Academy, is a historic Rosenwald school complex located at King William, King William County, Virginia. The complex was built in 1922–1923, and consists of the school, a home economics building, a shop building (ruin), and the girls’ privy (ruin).

It was listed on the National Register of Historic Places in 2006.

The King William Academy had its inception through a vision activated by the Reverend Dr. Samuel B. Holmes, a former pastor of the Third Union Baptist Church. The King William Academy was initially erected on the property of Dr. Holmes and his wife, Martha Bundy Holmes. Students throughout King William and King & Queen Counties attended the school with some students actually boarding with the Holmes' and other families in close proximity to the Academy.
