= Roseville Plantation (Aylett, Virginia) =

Historic house in Virginia, United States

- U.S. National Register of Historic Places
- Virginia Landmarks Register
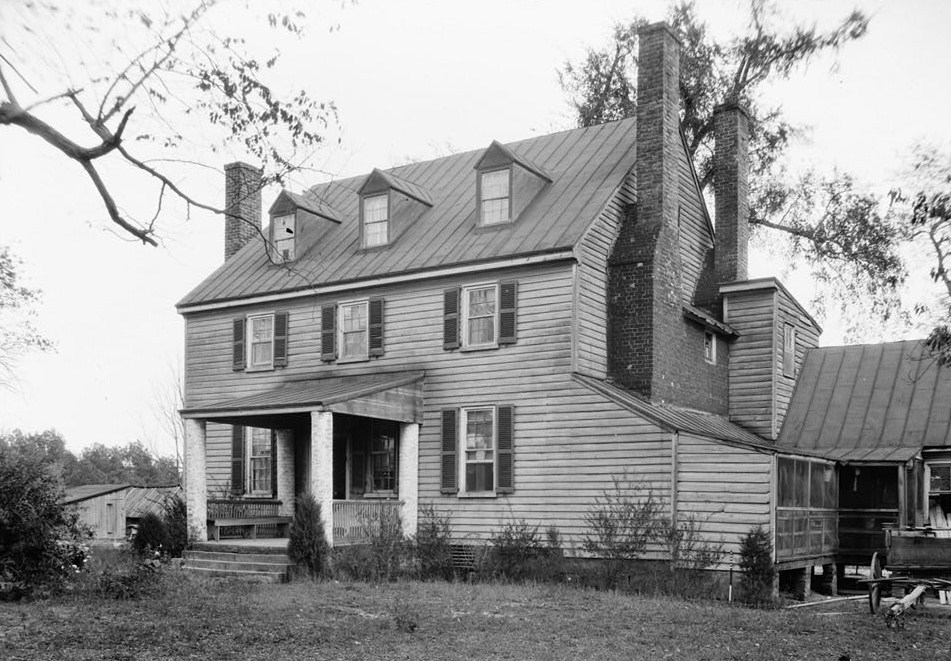
- Roseville, HABS Photo

- Location within Virginia Location within the United States
- Location: 3736 Herring Creek Rd, Aylett, Virginia
- Coordinates: 37°51′09″N 77°15′31″W
- Area: 148.8 acres (60.2 ha)
- Built: 1807
- Architectural style: Federal
- NRHP reference No.: 07000800
- VLR No.: 050-0060

Significant dates
- Added to NRHP: August 8, 2007
- Designated VLR: June 6, 2006

Roseville Plantation, also known as Floyd's, is a historic plantation home located near Aylett, King William County, Virginia. The main house was built in 1807, and is a 2 1/2-story, four-bay, frame dwelling in the Federal style. It sits on a brick foundation and is clad in weatherboard. Also on the property are the contributing one-story, one-bay detached frame kitchen; a one-story, two-bay frame school; a large, one-story, single-bay frame granary; a privy, a 1930s era barn, and two chicken houses, of which one has been converted to an equipment shed. The property also includes a slave cemetery and Ryland family cemetery.

It was listed on the National Register of Historic Places in 2007.
