= Horn Quarter =

Historic house in Virginia, United States

- U.S. National Register of Historic Places
- Virginia Landmarks Register
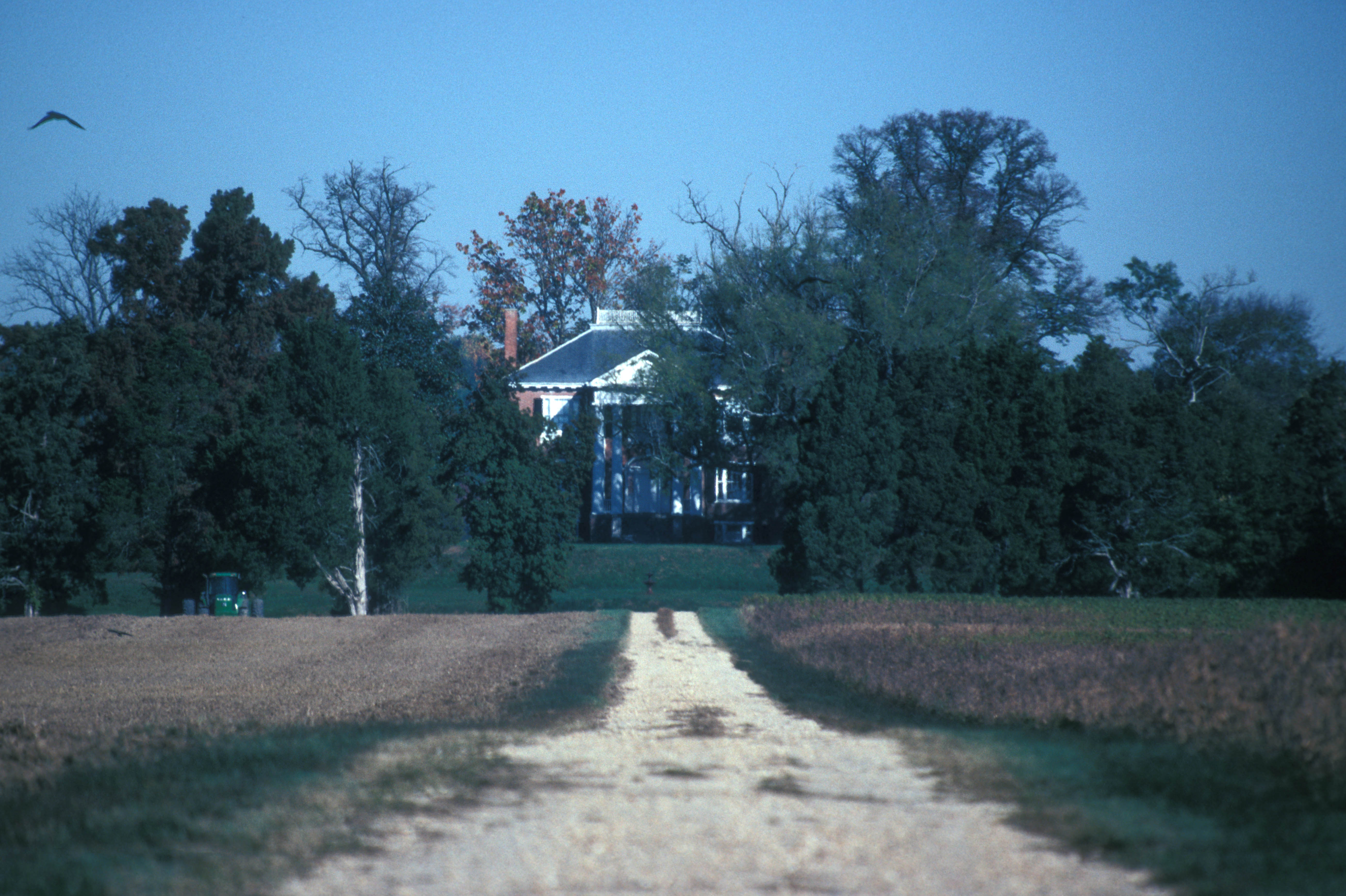
- Horn Quarter, April 1971

- Location within Virginia Location within the United States
- Location: NW of Manquin on VA 614, near Manquin, Virginia
- Coordinates: 37°46′24″N 77°18′50″W
- Area: 135 acres (55 ha)
- Built: c. 1830
- Architectural style: Federal
- NRHP reference No.: 80004196
- VLR No.: 050-0032

Significant dates
- Added to NRHP: June 09, 1980
- Designated VLR: March 18, 1980

Horn Quarter is a historic home located near Manquin, King William County, Virginia. It was built about 1830, and is a two-story, three bay by three bay, rectangular brick dwelling in the Federal style. It has a double-pile, central hall plan and is set on a brick foundation. The front facade features its original tetrastyle Roman Doric order pedimented portico with paired stuccoed columns and pilasters.

It was listed on the National Register of Historic Places in 1980.
