= Sharon Indian School =

Historic school building in Virginia, US

- U.S. National Register of Historic Places
- Virginia Landmarks Register
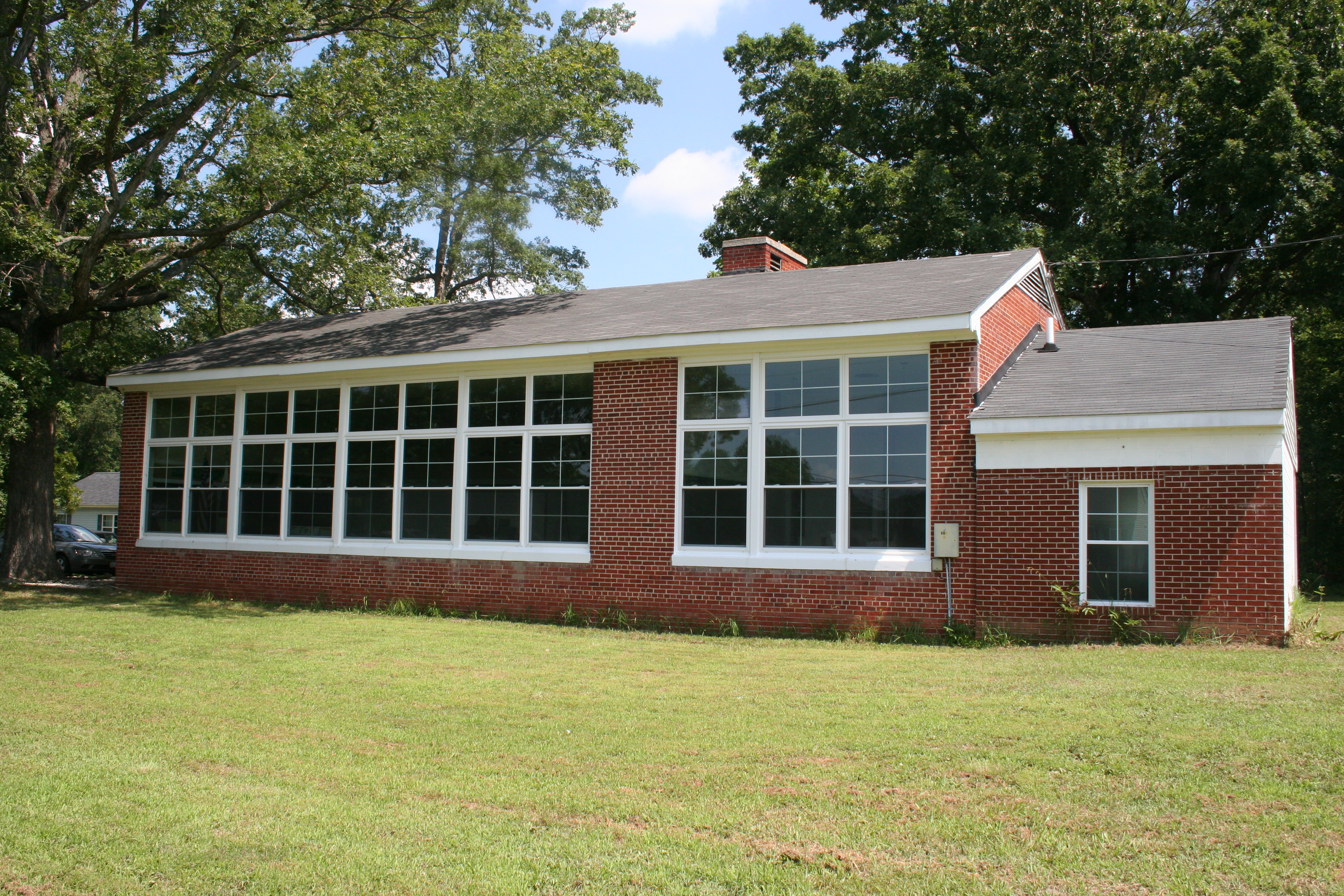
- Sharon Indian School, July 2012

- Location within Virginia Location within the United States
- Location: 13383 King William Rd., King William, Virginia
- Coordinates: 37.7345°N 77.1138°W
- Area: less than one acre
- Built: 1952
- Architect: Charles W. Huff Jr., Edward F. Sinnott
- Architectural style: Moderne, International Style
- NRHP reference No.: 07000764
- VLR No.: 050-5005

Significant dates
- Added to NRHP: July 27, 2007
- Designated VLR: June 8, 2006

Sharon Indian School, also known as Indian View, is a historic school building located at King William, King William County, Virginia. The original 1919 Sharon School was a one-room, vernacular frame structure raised on brick piers. It was built for members of the Upper Mattaponi tribe, led by Mollie Holmes Adams and her husband, Jasper. The extant 1952 Sharon School was designed by architect C.W. Huff, Jr., in association with architect Edward F. Sinnott (Richmond, VA). The school had two classrooms and offered children a primary and limited secondary education. The original school is thought to have been razed around 1964. The Sharon Indian School closed in 1965. It is a one-story, brick building with Hopper-style windows and assumes a vaguely International Style-inspired appearance.

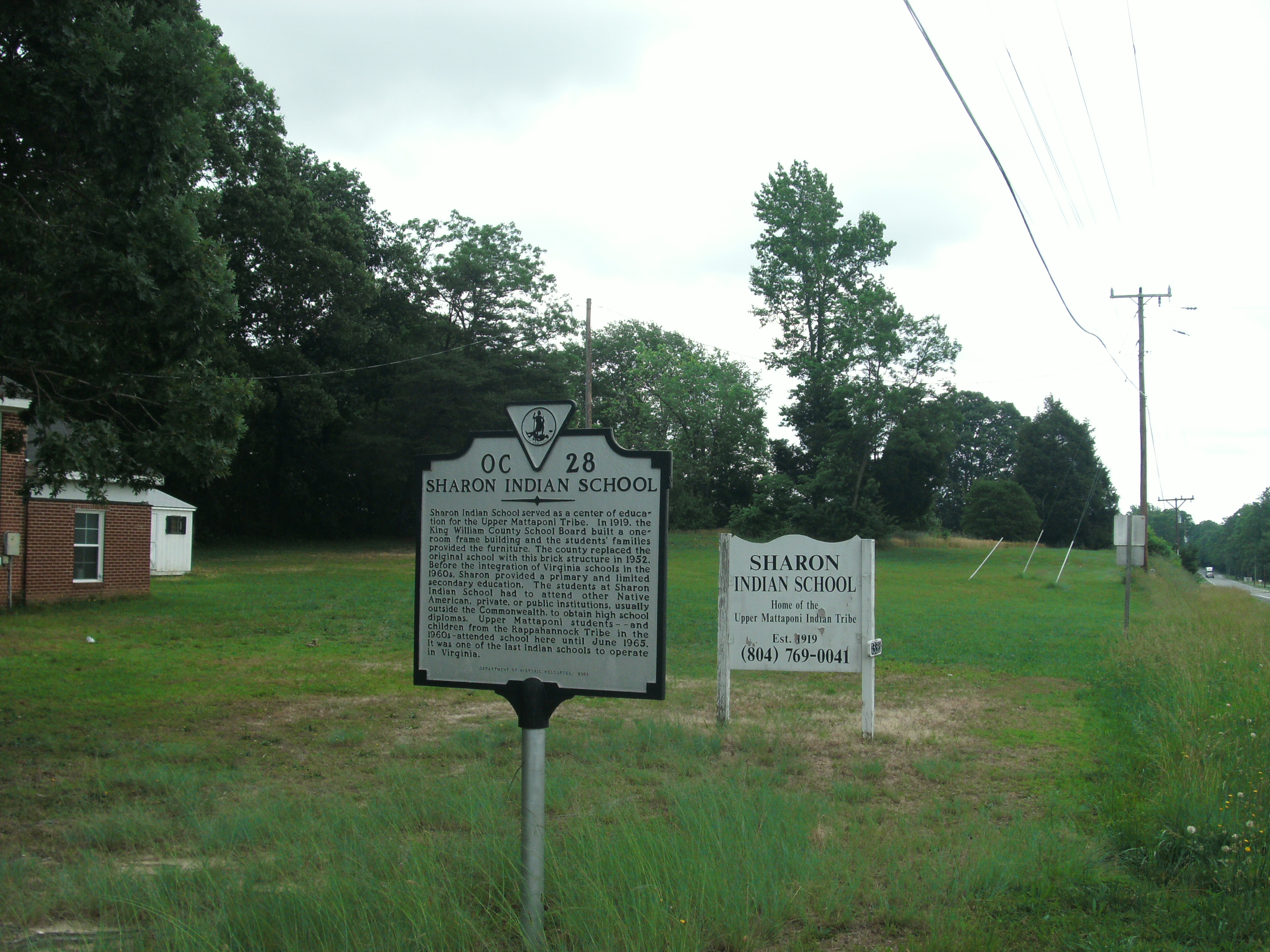
Historical marker of Sharon Indian School

It was listed on the Virginia Landmarks Register in 2006 and on the National Register of Historic Places in 2007.
