= Lanesville Christadelphian Church =

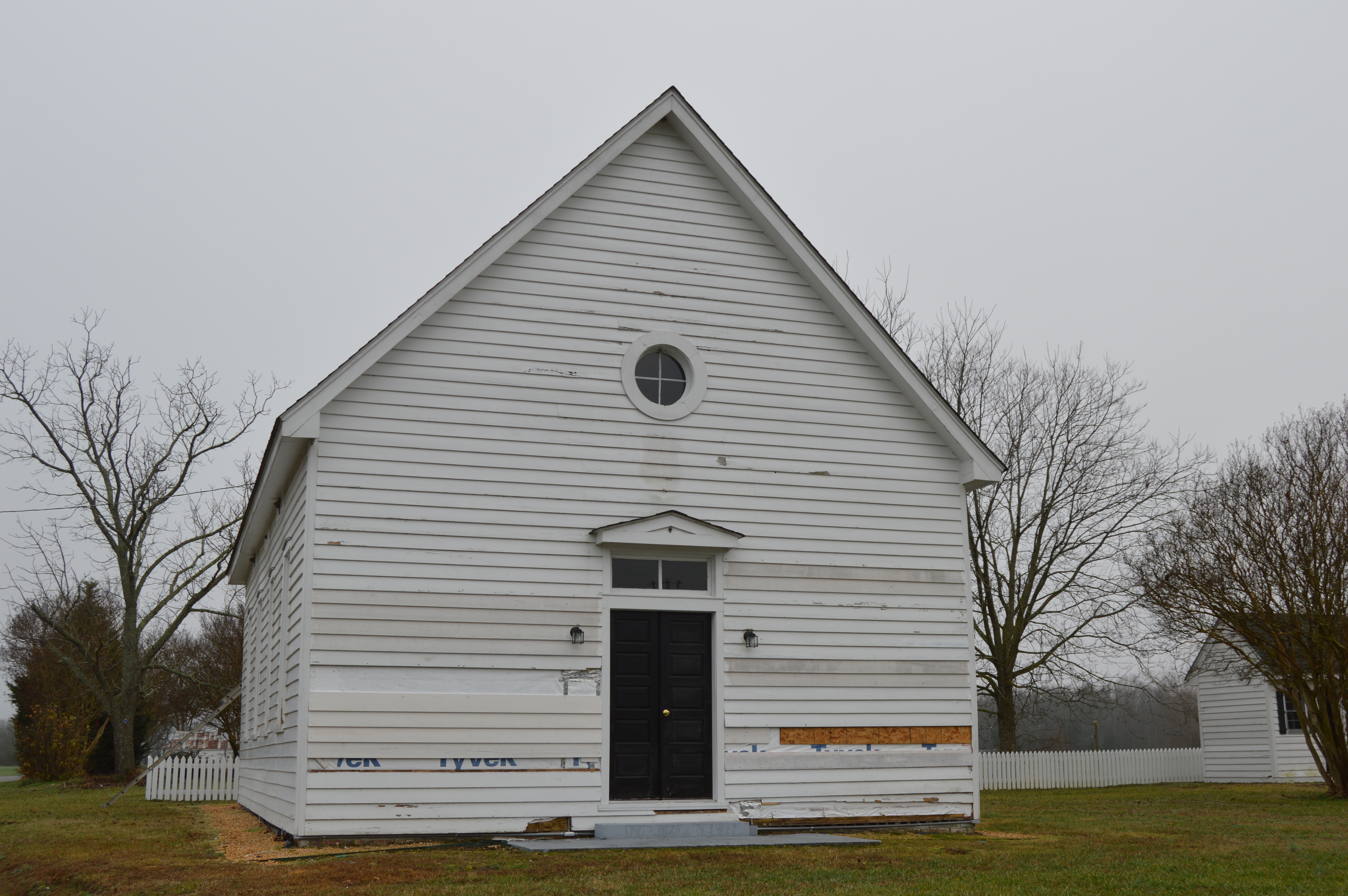
- The building's exterior in 2017
- Location: 7442 Mount Olive Cohoke Road, King William County, Virginia
- Coordinates: 37.61433°N 76.97869°W
- Built: c. 1875
- Architectural style(s): Vernacular rural Virginia
- Governing body: King William Historical Society
- Website: Virginia Department of Historic Resources

The Lanesville Christadelphian Church is a historic church building located at 7442 Mount Olive Cohoke Road in King William County, Virginia. Dating back to the late 1800s, the church is an example of a vernacular rural Virginia architecture, characterized by its rectangular footprint, simple architectural features, and large windows. The church was listed on the National Register of Historic Places on January 14, 2019.

== History ==
The Christadelphian sect was founded in the 1840s by Englishman Dr. John Thomas, who emphasized personal interpretation of biblical scripture. After the Civil War, Thomas visited Virginia. The Lanesville church was built around 1875, but by 1964, its membership had dissolved.

The King William Historical Society acquired the deed for the church in 2016. That year, they continued earlier stabilization and restoration efforts including the selective replacement of wood siding, exterior painting, and the installation of power, lighting, and HVAC.

== Architecture ==
The interior of the church features an open room with original wood flooring, wainscoting, window and door trim, lighting fixtures, wood pews, and a gently arched ceiling.
