= Sweet Hall, Virginia =

Unincorporated community in Virginia, United States

- Unincorporated community
- Location within Virginia and the United States Sweet Hall (the United States)
- Coordinates: 37°34′33″N 76°54′00″W
- Country: United States
- State: Virginia
- County: King William
- Elevation: 39 ft (12 m)
- Time zone: UTC−5 (Eastern (EST))
  - Summer (DST): UTC−4 (EDT)
- ZIP codes: 23086
- GNIS feature ID: 1475381

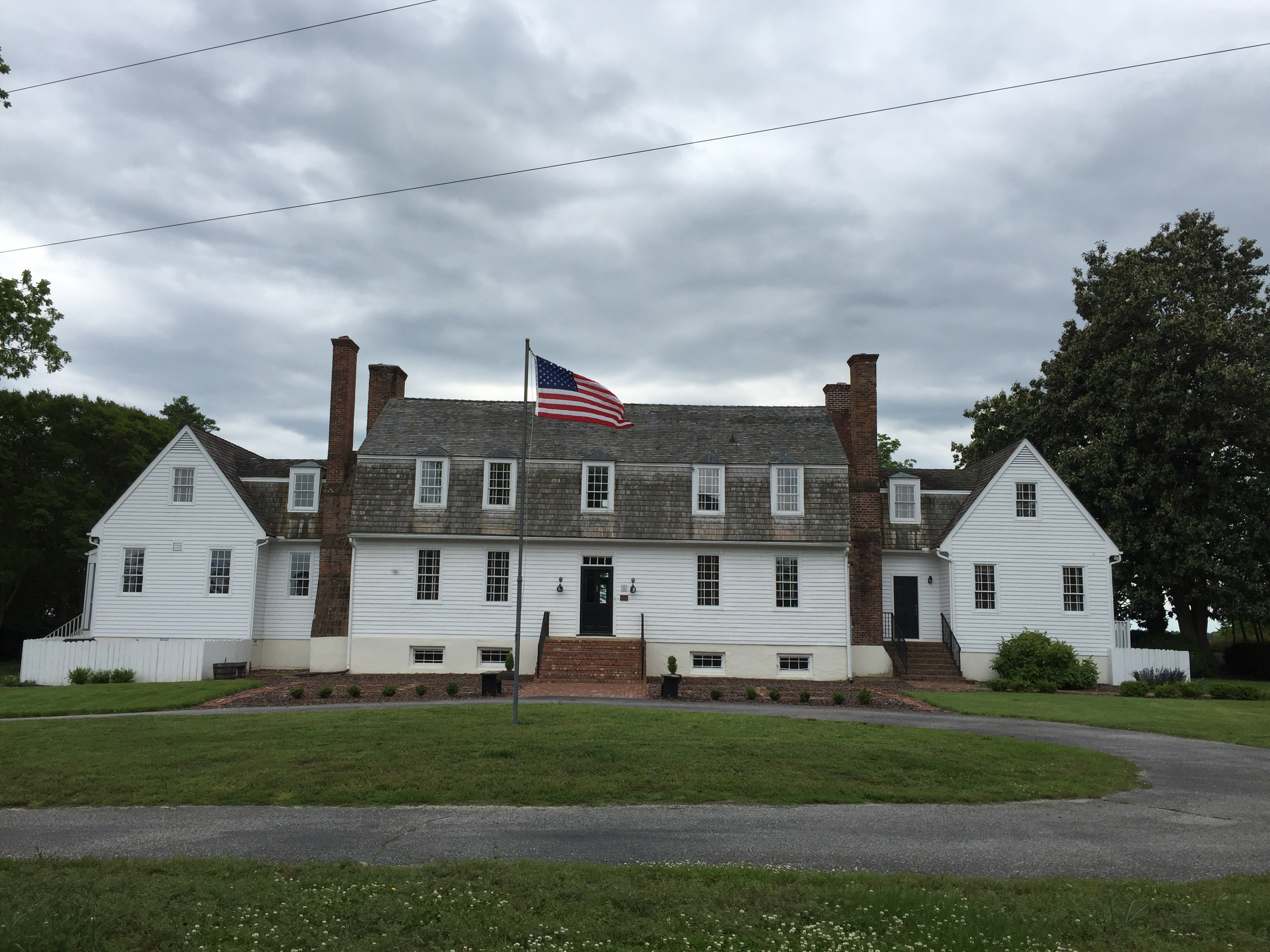
Windsor Shades, 2018

Sweet Hall (also known as Sweethall) is an unincorporated community on the northern bank of the Pamunkey River in southeastern King William County, Virginia, United States.

In none of the information easily available online about Sweet Hall is there mention that the owners were slaveholders, and that the structures were probably built and renovated by enslaved persons. Also, "outbuildings" were mentioned, but no mention was made of slave quarters, which surely existed. Enslaved persons were captive there until they followed the Union Army out of the area around 1863. For one account of life as an enslaved person at Sweet Hall, see Robert Ellett's account in Weevils in the Wheat, Interviews with Virginia Ex-Slaves. Weevils in the Wheat was "an expression used by slaves to communicate to one another that their plans for a secret meeting or dance had been discovered and that the gathering was called off. Weevils in the Wheat was edited by Charles L. Perdue, Jr., Thomas E. Barden and Robert K. Phillips. Copyright 1976 by the Rector and Visitors of the University of Virginia.

The small community includes two properties listed on the National Register of Historic Places: Sweet Hall and Windsor Shades. The Sweet Hall Marsh (part of the Chesapeake Bay National Estuarine Research Reserve) is located just south-southeast of the community.

== See also ==
- List of unincorporated communities in Virginia
