= West Point Historic District (West Point, Virginia) =

Historic district in Virginia, United States

- U.S. National Register of Historic Places
- U.S. Historic district
- Virginia Landmarks Register
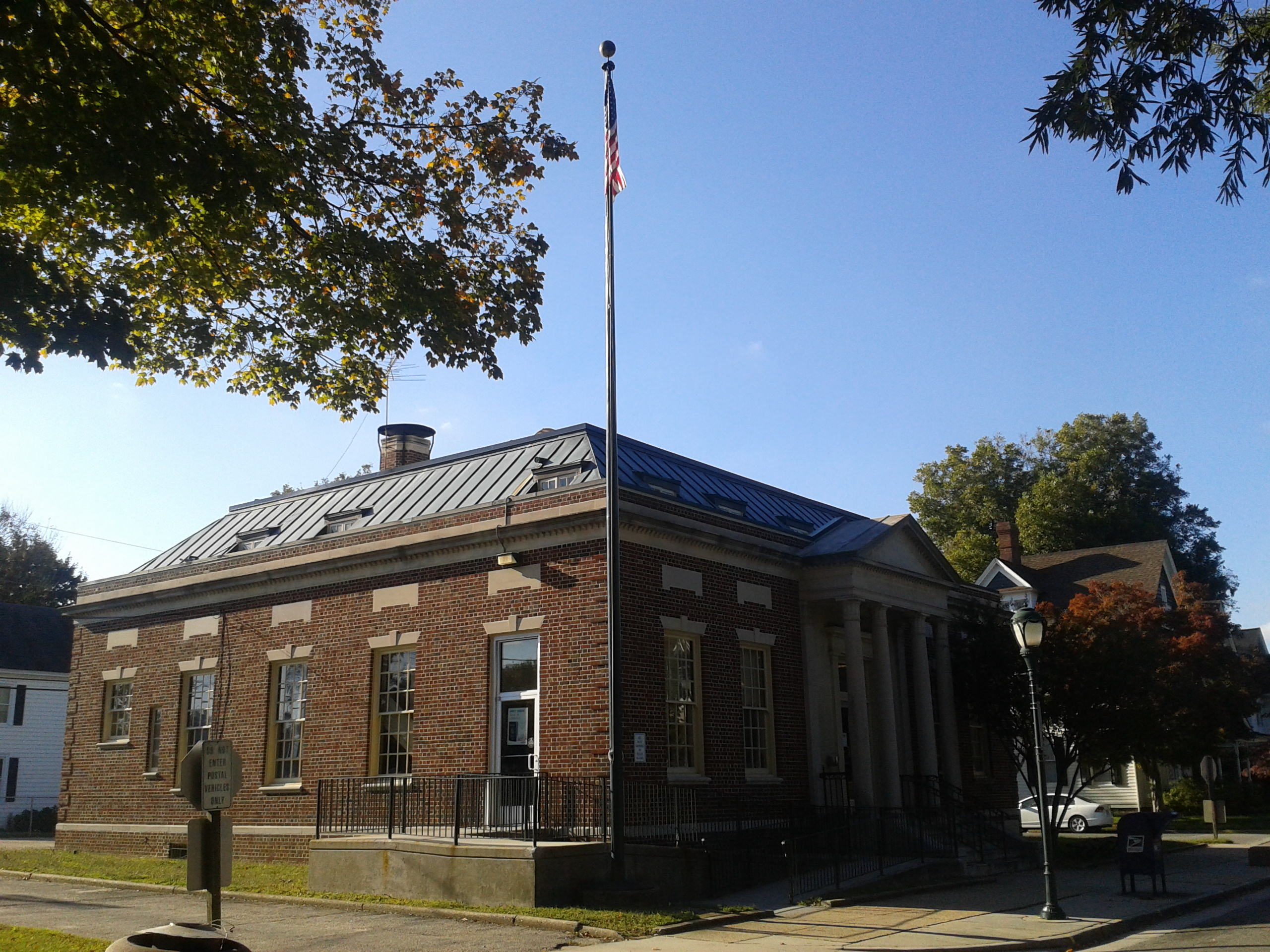
- United States Post Office in West Point, October, 2016

- Location within Virginia Location within the United States
- Location: Kirby, Main, and Lee Sts. from 1st through 13th Sts., West Point, Virginia
- Coordinates: 37°31′55″N 76°47′50″W
- Area: 96 acres (39 ha)
- Built: 1860
- Architect: multiple
- Architectural style: Italianate, Queen Anne, Gothic Revival
- NRHP reference No.: 96001051
- VLR No.: 325-0002

Significant dates
- Added to NRHP: October 03, 1996
- Designated VLR: March 20, 1996

West Point Historic District is a national historic district located at West Point, King William County, Virginia. The district encompasses 75 contributing buildings and 1 contributing object in the town of West Point. The district includes residential, commercial, and institutional buildings and is notable for its variety of late-19th- and early-20th-century styles and building types. Notable buildings include the William Mitchell House (c. 1850), Anderson-Mayo House (c. 1850), Ware House (c. 1870), St. John's Episcopal Church (1882), Mt. Nebo Baptist Church (1887), West Point United Methodist Church (1889), O'Connor Hotel and annex (c. 1895), Treat-Medlin House (1898), Gouldman House (1923), First Baptist Church (1926), U.S. Post Office (1931), West Point Town Office Building, Citizens and Exchange Bank (1923), and Beverly Allen School (1930s).

It was listed on the National Register of Historic Places in 1996.
