= Pamunkey Indian Reservation =

Pamunkey Indian Reservation, Virginia
- Indian reservation
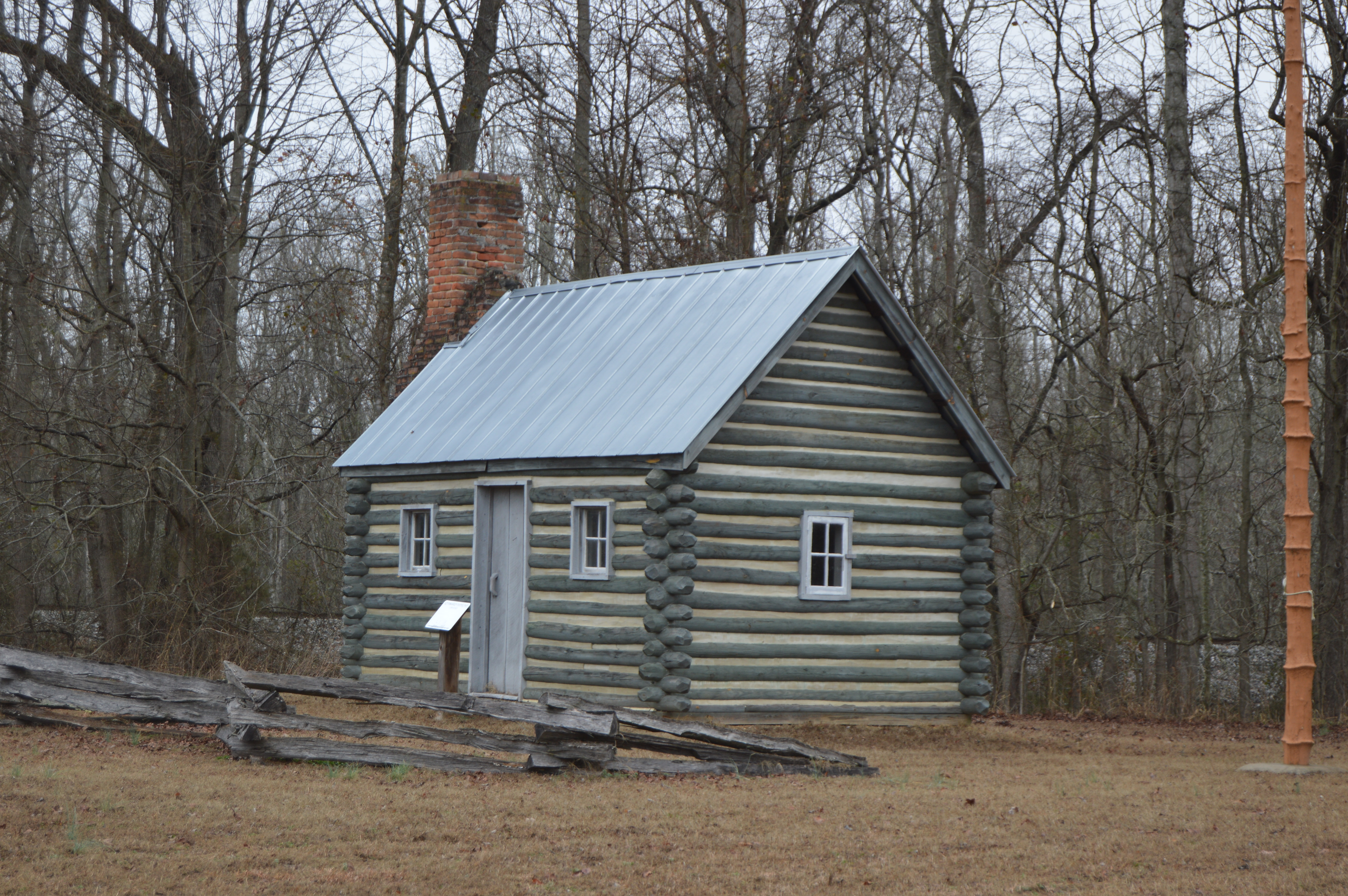
- Replica cabin near the reservation entrance

- Location within the Commonwealth of Virginia
- Coordinates: 37°34′29″N 77°0′5″W
- Country: United States
- State: Virginia
- County: King William
- Established: 1658

Government
  - Chief: Robert Gray

Area
  - Total: 1.9 sq mi (4.8 km^{2})
  - Land: 1.1 sq mi (2.8 km^{2})
  - Water: 0.77 sq mi (2.0 km^{2})
- Elevation: 9.8 ft (3 m)

Population (2012)
  - Total: 80
  - Density: 43/sq mi (16.7/km^{2})
- Time zone: UTC-5 (Eastern (EST))
  - Summer (DST): UTC-4 (EDT)
- ZIP code: 23806
- Area code: 804
- Website: pamunkey.org
- Pamunkey Indian Reservation Archaeological District
- U.S. National Register of Historic Places
- U.S. Historic district
- Location within Virginia Location within the United States
- Nearest city: Lanesville, Virginia
- Area: 1,700 acres (690 ha)
- NRHP reference No.: 82004567
- Added to NRHP: September 16, 1982

The Pamunkey Indian Reservation is a Native American reservation of the Pamunkey Indian Tribe in King William, Virginia, United States. It lies along the Pamunkey River in King William County, Virginia on the Middle Peninsula. It contains approximately 1,200 acres (4.9 km^{2}) of land, 500 acres (2.0 km^{2}) of which is wetlands with numerous creeks. Thirty-four families reside on the reservation and many Tribal members live in nearby Richmond, Newport News, and other parts of Virginia.

== History ==
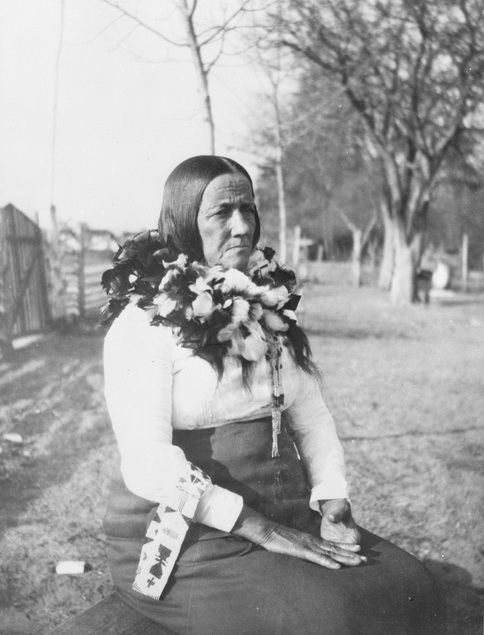
Theodora Octavia Dennis Cook, Pamunkey Powhatan, ca. 1864-ca. 1935. Mrs. Cook is wearing a traditional turkey feather neck ornament, now in the collections of NMAI.

It was confirmed to the Pamunkey tribe as early as 1658 by the governor, the council, and the General Assembly of Virginia. The treaty of 1677 between the king of England, acting through the governor of Virginia, and several Native American tribes including the Pamunkey is the most important existing document describing Virginia's relationship to Indian land. The Pamunkey tribe's early ancestors had locations as far north as the Middle Peninsula of Virginia and as far south as South Hampton Roads in Virginia. A burial mound, reported to contain the remains of Chief Powhatan, father of Matoaka (better known to historians and the public as Pocahontas), is also on this reservation, next to railroad tracks. His brother Opechancanough relocated his remains here. He is also buried here.
