= West Point, Virginia =

- Town
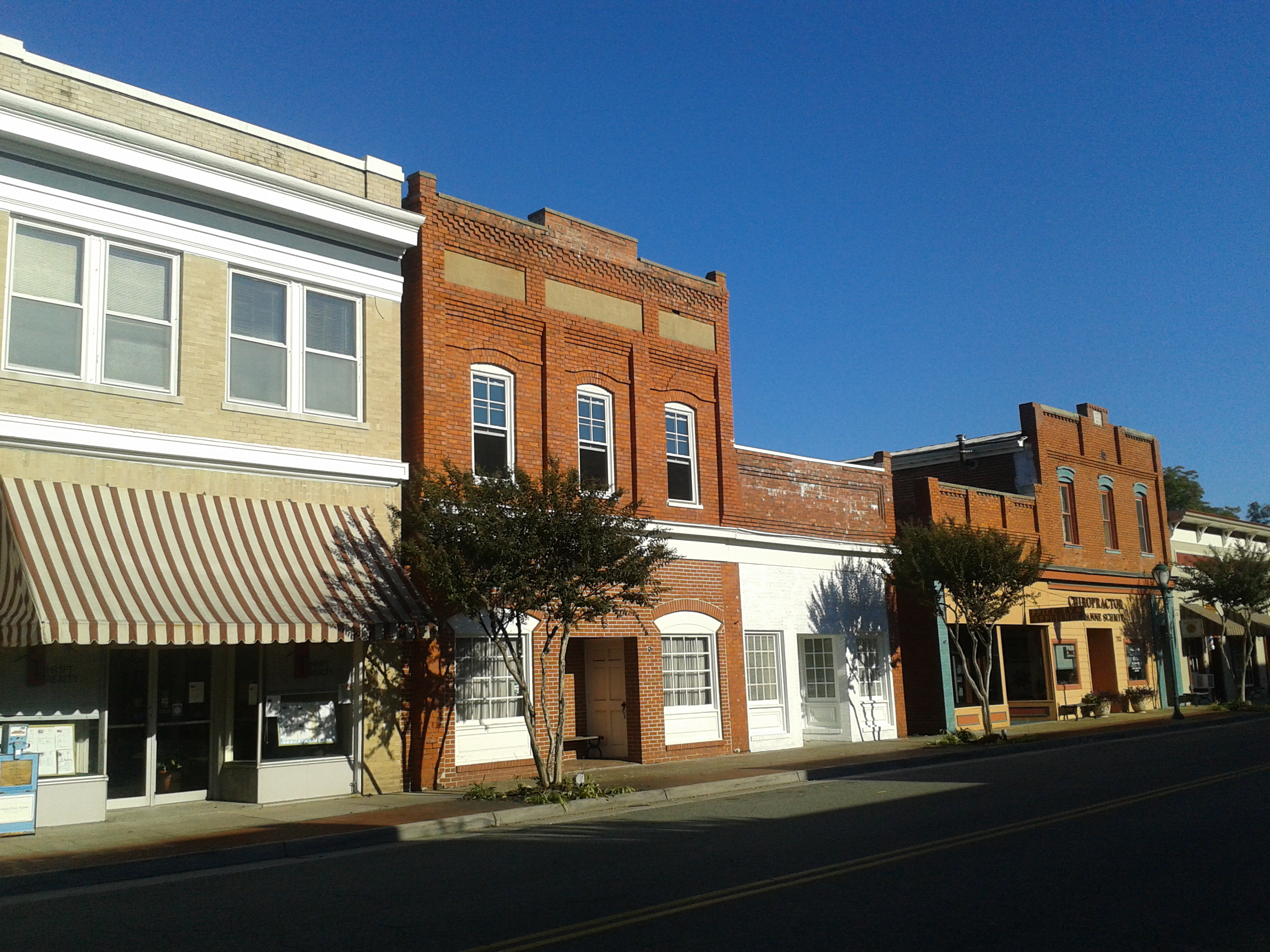
- Storefronts in 2016

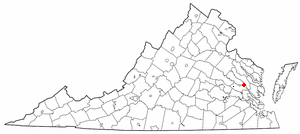
- Location of West Point, Virginia
- Coordinates: 37°32′37″N 76°48′19″W
- Country: United States
- State: Virginia
- County: King William

Government
  - Mayor: Jack Lawson

Area
  - Total: 6.66 sq mi (17.25 km^{2})
  - Land: 5.05 sq mi (13.08 km^{2})
  - Water: 1.61 sq mi (4.17 km^{2})
- Elevation: 62 ft (19 m)

Population (2020)
  - Total: 3,414
  - Estimate (2019): 3,257
  - Density: 644.9/sq mi (248.99/km^{2})
- Time zone: UTC-5 (Eastern (EST))
  - Summer (DST): UTC-4 (EDT)
- ZIP code: 23181
- Area code: 804
- FIPS code: 51-84960
- GNIS feature ID: 1500297
- Website: www.west-point.va.us

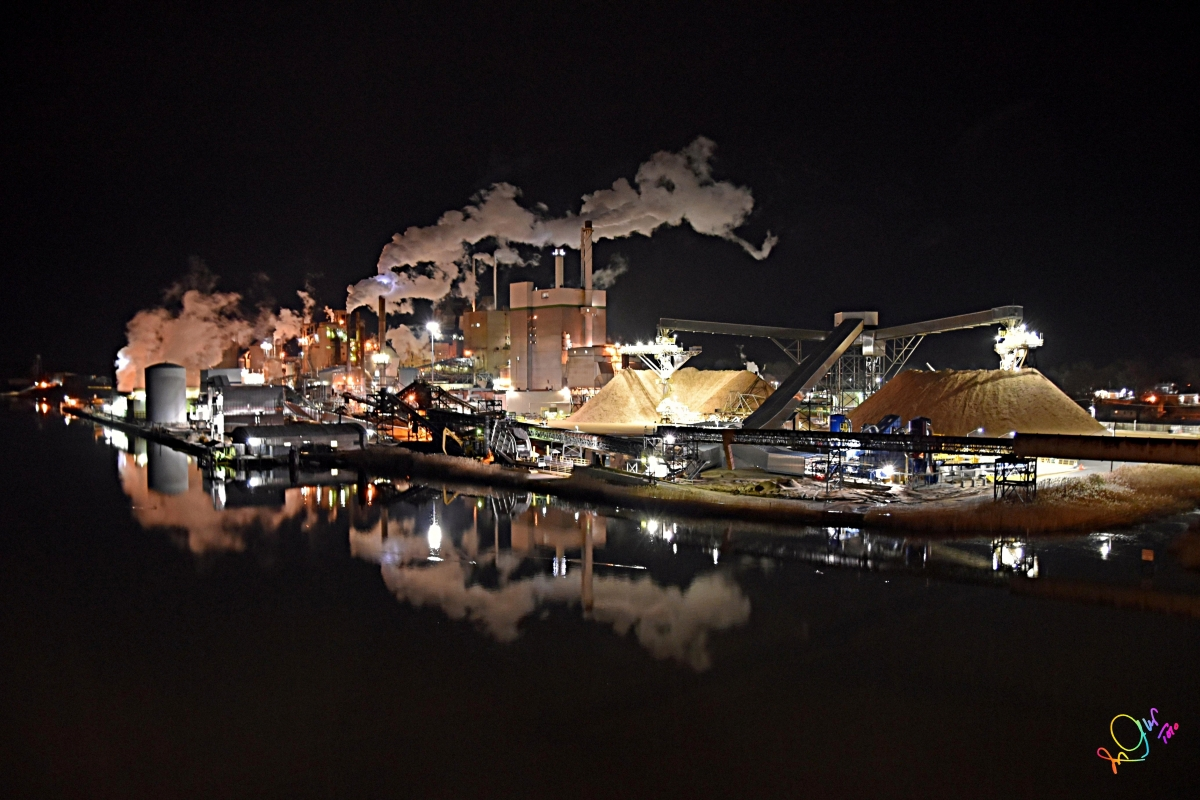

West Point (formerly Delaware) is an incorporated town in King William County, Virginia, United States. The population was 3,414 at the 2020 census.

== Geography ==
West Point is located at 37°32′37″N 76°48′19″W (37.543733, −76.805366). The York River is formed at West Point by the confluence of the Mattaponi and Pamunkey rivers; from there, it separates the Virginia Peninsula and Middle Peninsula regions of eastern Virginia as it flows approximately 40 miles (64 km) to the Chesapeake Bay.

According to the United States Census Bureau, the town has a total area of 6.7 square miles (17 km^{2}), of which 5.2 square miles (13 km^{2}) is land and 1.5 square miles (3.9 km^{2}) (23.12%) is water.

Much of downtown West Point is listed on the National Register of Historic Places as the West Point Historic District.

== History ==
The current site of West Point was once the site of Cinquoteck, a Native American village of the local Mattaponi, an Algonquian-speaking tribe affiliated with the Powhatan Confederacy. During the first half of the 17th century, the Confederacy and the English colonists who established their first permanent settlement at Jamestown in 1607 were frequently in conflict. By mid-century, the Natives had been largely overcome, including the area of Cinquoteck, by the ever-expanding Colony of Virginia.

By treaty, the colonial government established reservations for the Mattaponi and Pamunkey in this area. More than 350 years later, Pamunkey and Mattaponi tribal members continue to occupy the reservations, located a few miles north of modern-day West Point. Both are state-recognized tribes, which now number 11.

In 1655, Port Richmond West Plantation, the home of John West, was developed to incorporate the former site of Cinquetock. West was a Governor of Virginia from 1635 to 1637.

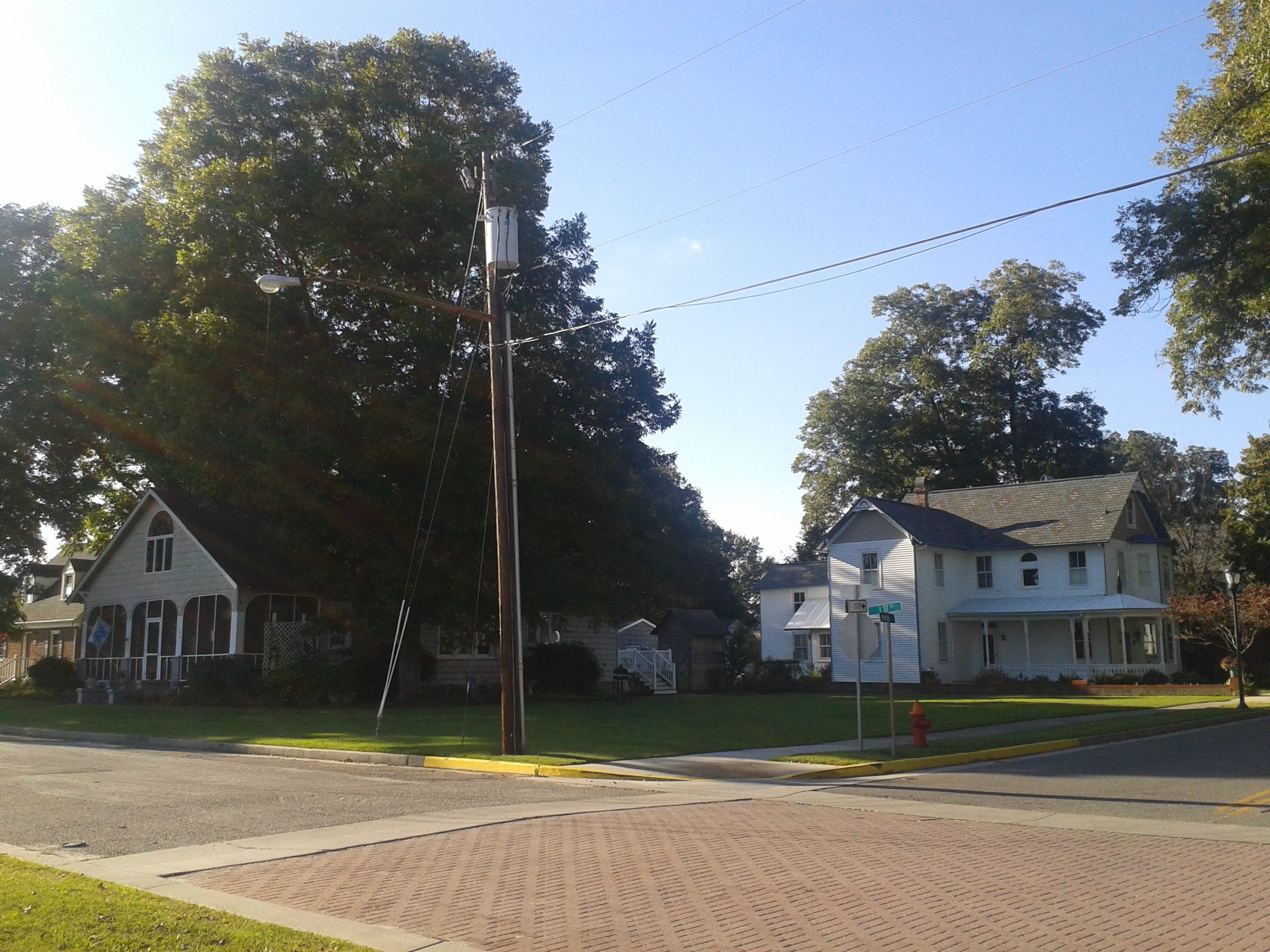
Houses in a residential section of West Point

After the West family sold off parts of the plantation, a settlement started at what became called West Point, which had access to the York River. In 1691, the Virginia General Assembly directed that West Point be chartered as a port of entry on the York. In 1705 the House of Burgesses authorized the town to qualify as a "free borough", and renamed it "Delaware" in honor of former Royal Governor Thomas West, 3rd Baron De La Warr. He was John West's elder brother, an early settler of Jamestown, and an earlier colonial governor.

When the Richmond and York River Railroad was built and completed in 1861 to the port community, just before the onset of the American Civil War, the city took back its former name of "West Point". The railroad was a key strategic goal of Union General George B. McClellan's failed Peninsula Campaign in 1862 to capture Richmond. Massively damaged during the War, the railroad was later rebuilt. It became part of the Richmond and Danville Railroad system.

In 1870, West Point became an incorporated town. Linked to Richmond by rail, it became a major shipping point for passenger and freight traffic. It was especially convenient for travel to Baltimore and points north via the York River and the Chesapeake Bay. Much of the Richmond and Danville Railroad (including the section between Richmond and West Point) became part of the Southern Railway in the 1890s during a financial reorganization.

Until the early 20th century, West Point was a thriving commercial port and resort destination. However, the port status declined with the completion of more railroads to the ocean harbor area of Hampton Roads, notably including the Chesapeake and Ohio Railway at Newport News and the Atlantic Coast Line Railroad at Portsmouth. Likewise, tourists began to frequent newer destinations closer to the ocean.

After the decline of both shipping and tourism, a shipyard built in 1917 and a 1914 pulp paper mill are credited with bringing new jobs to the town. In the 1980s, the railroad was acquired by the Norfolk Southern Railway system in continued restructuring of the industry. It has continued to serve the town's paper mill into the early 21st century.

== Public schools ==
West Point is one of two towns in Virginia to have a school division (terminology for a school district in Virginia) which is independent from the school division of the county in which it is located. (The other town with an independent school division is Colonial Beach, located in Westmoreland County in the Northern Neck region.)

The West Point school systems are consistently recognized among the top rated public schools in the Commonwealth of Virginia. West Point also sends students to Maggie L. Walker Governor's School for Government and International Studies.

== Climate ==
Climate data for West Point 2 NW, Virginia (1991–2020 normals, extremes 1954–present)
Month	Jan	Feb	Mar	Apr	May	Jun	Jul	Aug	Sep	Oct	Nov	Dec	Year
Record high °F (°C)	82 (28)	83 (28)	90 (32)	97 (36)	98 (37)	104 (40)	106 (41)	104 (40)	105 (41)	98 (37)	85 (29)	83 (28)	106 (41)
Mean daily maximum °F (°C)	49.0 (9.4)	52.8 (11.6)	60.7 (15.9)	71.8 (22.1)	78.7 (25.9)	86.1 (30.1)	90.0 (32.2)	87.7 (30.9)	81.8 (27.7)	71.7 (22.1)	61.1 (16.2)	52.0 (11.1)	70.3 (21.3)
Daily mean °F (°C)	38.7 (3.7)	41.3 (5.2)	48.5 (9.2)	58.8 (14.9)	67.0 (19.4)	75.0 (23.9)	79.2 (26.2)	77.3 (25.2)	71.2 (21.8)	60.2 (15.7)	49.8 (9.9)	41.8 (5.4)	59.1 (15.1)
Mean daily minimum °F (°C)	28.4 (−2.0)	29.9 (−1.2)	36.3 (2.4)	45.7 (7.6)	55.3 (12.9)	63.9 (17.7)	68.4 (20.2)	66.8 (19.3)	60.6 (15.9)	48.7 (9.3)	38.4 (3.6)	31.7 (−0.2)	47.8 (8.8)
Record low °F (°C)	−7 (−22)	−1 (−18)	10 (−12)	24 (−4)	30 (−1)	38 (3)	48 (9)	45 (7)	36 (2)	19 (−7)	12 (−11)	0 (−18)	−7 (−22)
Average precipitation inches (mm)	3.59 (91)	2.83 (72)	3.96 (101)	3.76 (96)	4.05 (103)	4.48 (114)	4.86 (123)	4.78 (121)	4.89 (124)	4.07 (103)	3.01 (76)	3.60 (91)	47.88 (1,216)
Average snowfall inches (cm)	4.3 (11)	2.6 (6.6)	1.0 (2.5)	0.1 (0.25)	0.0 (0.0)	0.0 (0.0)	0.0 (0.0)	0.0 (0.0)	0.0 (0.0)	0.0 (0.0)	0.0 (0.0)	1.6 (4.1)	9.6 (24)
Average precipitation days (≥ 0.01 in)	10.5	9.8	11.1	10.8	11.8	11.0	11.0	10.1	8.9	8.5	9.1	10.6	123.2
Average snowy days (≥ 0.1 in)	2.1	2.0	1.0	0.0	0.0	0.0	0.0	0.0	0.0	0.0	0.0	1.0	6.1
Source: NOAA

== Demographics ==
Historical population
Census	Pop.	Note	%±
1880	557		—
1890	2,018		262.3%
1900	1,307		−35.2%
1910	1,397		6.9%
1920	1,635		17.0%
1930	1,844		12.8%
1940	1,947		5.6%
1950	1,919		−1.4%
1960	1,678		−12.6%
1970	2,600		54.9%
1980	2,726		4.8%
1990	2,938		7.8%
2000	2,866		−2.5%
2010	3,306		15.4%
2020	3,414		3.3%
U.S. Decennial Census

As of the census of 2000, there were 2,866 people, 1,068 households, and 809 families residing in the town. The population density was 559.2 people per square mile (215.7/km^{2}). There were 1,151 housing units at an average density of 224.6 per square mile (86.6/km^{2}). The racial makeup of the town was 80.32% White, 16.92% African American, 0.45% Native American, 1.05% Asian, 0.35% from other races, and 0.91% from two or more races. Hispanic or Latino of any race were 1.74% of the population.

There were 1,068 households, out of which 35.8% had children under the age of 18 living with them, 59.6% were married couples living together, 12.8% had a female householder with no husband present, and 24.2% were non-families. 21.8% of all households were made up of individuals, and 11.8% had someone living alone who was 65 years of age or older. The average household size was 2.59 and the average family size was 3.00.

In the town, the population was spread out, with 26.0% under the age of 18, 5.2% from 18 to 24, 25.5% from 25 to 44, 25.4% from 45 to 64, and 17.9% who were 65 years of age or older. The median age was 39 years. For every 100 females there were 89.2 males. For every 100 females aged 18 and over, there were 87.0 males.

The median income for a household in the town was $49,655, and the median income for a family was $56,932. Males had a median income of $40,071 versus $24,702 for females. The per capita income for the town was $23,232. About 1.7% of families and 2.8% of the population were below the poverty line, including 2.9% of those under age 18 and 2.6% of those age 65 or over.

== Events ==
Since 1983 the town holds the Crab Carnival annually during the first weekend of October. According to the Crab Carnival official website, it is a time for the community to celebrate the Town's history and keep a tradition continuing.

== Education ==
Residents are in the West Point Town Public Schools.

== Notable people ==
- Lewis "Chesty" Puller (1898–1971) – One of the most highly decorated officers in the history of the U.S. Marine Corps.
