= List of former primary state highways in Virginia (Fredericksburg District) =

The following is a list of former primary state highways completely or mostly within the Fredericksburg District (VDOT District 6) of the U.S. state of Virginia.

== SR 124 ==
State Route 124
- Location: Port Richmond
- Existed: 1930–1943

State Route 124 connected SR 30 in Port Richmond (now within West Point limits) to the former Port Richmond Airport along present SR 701 (Euclid Boulevard). The first 1 mile (1.6 km) was added to the state highway system in 1930 as State Route 625, which was extended the remaining 0.2 miles (0.32 km) to the airport in 1932. SR 625 became SR 219 in the 1933 renumbering, but when US 219 entered Virginia in 1937 (and replaced SR 124), SR 219 became SR 124. SR 124 was downgraded to secondary in 1943 after the airport was abandoned.

== SR 199 ==
State Route 199
- Location: Millers Tavern-Bowlers Wharf
- Existed: 1928–1955

State Route 199 followed current secondary SR 684 from US 360 at Millers Tavern east across US 17 at Center Cross to the Rappahannock River at Bowlers Wharf. 9.6 miles (15.4 km), from Millers Tavern almost to Center Cross, was added to the state highway system in 1928 as State Route 604, which was extended the rest of the way to Bowlers Wharf in 1930. SR 604 became SR 199 in the 1933 renumbering and was downgraded to secondary in 1955.

== SR 208 ==
State Route 208
- Location: US 1-Villboro
- Existed: 1928–1945

State Route 208 followed current secondary SR 605 and SR 626 from US 1 between Cedon and Thornburg east via Woodford to SR 2 at Villboro. 9.5 miles (15.3 km) at the west end was added to the state highway system in 1928 as State Route 615, which was extended the rest of the way to Villboro in 1930. SR 615 became SR 208 in the 1933 renumbering and was downgraded to secondary in 1945 as an extension of existing SR 605 (now partly SR 626).

== SR 209 (1928-1948) ==
State Route 209
- Location: Snell-west
- Existed: 1928–1948

State Route 209 extended west from SR 51 (now SR 738) at Snell via Post Oak and Margo to Paytes, then south to 0.3 miles (0.48 km) short of SR 652 at Granite Springs in the direction of Belmont and SR 719 (former US 522). The route is now portions of SR 208 Business, SR 208, SR 606, and SR 601. The first piece, 5.75 miles (9.25 km) at the east end, was added to the state highway system in 1928 as State Route 616. Extensions were made of 4.2 miles (6.8 km) in 1930, 1.1 miles (1.8 km) in 1931, and finally 7.7 miles (12.4 km) in 1932. SR 616 became SR 209 in the 1933 renumbering. The portion west of Paytes was downgraded to secondary in 1944 as an extension of existing SR 601, and the remainder joined it in 1948 as an extension of existing SR 606. The east end from Snell to Post Oak would return to the primary system in 1950 as part of SR 208, which took a more direct route from Post Oak southwesterly towards US 522.

== SR 210 ==
State Route 210
- Location: Wilderness Corner-Spotsylvania
- Existed: 1928–1952

State Route 210 followed current secondary SR 613 from SR 3 at Wilderness Corner southeast to SR 208 (now SR 208 Business) at Spotsylvania. A majority of the route from the Wilderness Corner end was added to the state highway system in 1928 as State Route 617, which was extended the remaining 2.4 miles (3.9 km) to Spotsylvania in 1930. SR 617 became SR 210 in the 1933 renumbering and was downgraded to secondary in 1952.

== SR 212 ==
State Route 212
- Location: Stafford-Brooke
- Existed: 1928–1948

State Route 212 extended southeast from US 1 at Stafford along current secondary SR 630 and SR 629 to SR 608 at Brooke. It was added to the state highway system in 1928 as State Route 618, became SR 212 in the 1933 renumbering, and was downgraded to secondary in 1948, being initially numbered SR 687.

== SR 213 ==
State Route 213
- Location: Aquia Tavern-northwest
- Existed: 1928–1943

State Route 213 followed current secondary SR 610 from the historic Aquia Church northwest across US 1 at Aquia Tavern to the Stafford-Fauquier County line east of Somerville. The first 6.7 miles (10.8 km), northwest from US 1, was added to the state highway system in 1928 as State Route 619, which was extended a further 1 mile (1.6 km) in 1930 and 3.5 miles (5.6 km) in 1932, along with 1/4 mile (0.40 km) east of US 1 to the church. SR 619 became SR 213 in the 1933 renumbering and was extended the final 1/4 mile (0.40 km) to the county line in October of that year. All of SR 213 was downgraded to secondary in 1943, initially as SR 676 but later renumbered 610 to match Fauquier County.

== SR 215 ==
State Route 215
- Location: Tappahannock-west
- Existed: 1930–1944

State Route 215 extended west from US 17 in Tappahannock along present SR 657 (Marsh Street) and SR 627 to 1.1 miles (1.8 km) short of Rexburg, in the direction of SR 14 (now SR 721) at Sparta. 2.5 miles (4.0 km) were added to the state highway system in 1930 as State Route 621, which was extended another 4.8 miles (7.7 km) in 1932. East of SR 716 at Upper Mount Landing, this had been a former alignment of US 17. SR 621 became SR 215 in the 1933 renumbering, and was downgraded to secondary in 1944 as an extension of existing SR 627.

== SR 217 ==
State Route 217
- Location: Ark-southwest
- Existed: 1930–1942

State Route 217 extended southwest from US 17 at Ark to 2 miles (3.2 km) short of Allmonds Wharf on the York River along present secondary SR 606. The first 0.15 miles (0.24 km) was added to the state highway system in 1930 as State Route 623, which was extended another 4.2 miles (6.8 km) in 1932. SR 623 became SR 217 in the 1933 renumbering, and was downgraded to secondary in 1942 as an extension of existing SR 606.

== SR 224 ==
State Route 224
- Location: Foster-Mobjack
- Existed: 1930–1951

State Route 224 extended south from SR 14 at Foster to Mobjack on the East River along present SR 660. The first 1 mile (1.6 km) was added to the state highway system in 1930 as State Route 630, which was extended another 4 miles (6.4 km) in 1932. In the 1933 renumbering, SR 630 became SR 224, which was extended the remaining 1.3 miles (2.1 km) to Mobjack in October 1933 and downgraded to secondary in 1951.

== SR 226 ==
State Route 226
- Location: US 17-Water View
- Existed: 1930–1942

State Route 226 extended northeast from US 17 north of Church View to Water View on the Rappahannock River along present SR 640. The first 0.2 miles (0.32 km) was added to the state highway system in 1930 as State Route 631, which was extended another 4 miles (6.4 km) in 1932. In the 1933 renumbering, SR 631 became SR 226, which was extended the remaining 1.2 miles (1.9 km) to Water View in 1937 and downgraded to secondary in 1942.

== SR 228 ==
State Route 228
- Location: SR 3-Sharps
- Existed: 1930–1951

State Route 228 extended southwest from SR 3 east of Emmerton to Sharps on the Rappahannock River along present SR 642. The first 2.5 miles (4.0 km) were added to the state highway system in 1930 as State Route 632, which was extended the remaining 3.6 miles (5.8 km) in 1932. SR 632 became SR 228 in the 1933 renumbering, and was downgraded to secondary in 1951 as an extension of existing SR 642.

== SR 229 ==
State Route 229
- Location: Chilesburg-Ladysmith
- Existed: 1928–1942

State Route 229 followed current secondary SR 639 from SR 51 (now SR 738) at Chilesburg east to US 1 at Ladysmith. 2.9 miles (4.7 km) at the east end was added to the state highway system in 1928 as State Route 614, which was extended the rest of the way to Ladysmith in 1930. SR 614 became part of SR 207 in the 1933 renumbering, was renumbered SR 229 in 1935 or 1936, and was downgraded to secondary in 1942 as an extension of existing SR 639.

== SR 293 ==
State Route 293
- Location: Whites Shop-Lanesville
- Existed: 1930–1944

State Route 293 ran along present secondary SR 633 from SR 30 at Whites Shop (just southeast of King William) south to a point approximately 1/4 mile (0.40 km) south of Lanesville. About 1 mile (1.6 km) at the north end was added to the state highway system in 1930 as State Route 626, which was extended to just past Lanesville in 1932. The route was renumbered State Route 220 in the 1933 renumbering, but with the arrival of US 220 in Virginia in 1935 it was renumbered 293. Never making it to Lester Manor on the Pamunkey River (as the descriptions from the 1930 and 1932 additions imply was the aim), SR 293 was downgraded to secondary in 1944 as an extension of existing SR 633.

Major intersections

The entire route is in King William County.

Location	mi	km	Destinations	Notes
	0.00	0.00	SR 633 (Powhatan Trail)	
Whites Shop	5.70	9.17	SR 30 (King William Road) – Central Garage, West Point	
1.000 mi = 1.609 km; 1.000 km = 0.621 mi
