= Wrightsville, Virginia =

Unincorporated community in Virginia, United States

Coordinates: 38°01′42″N 77°19′53″W

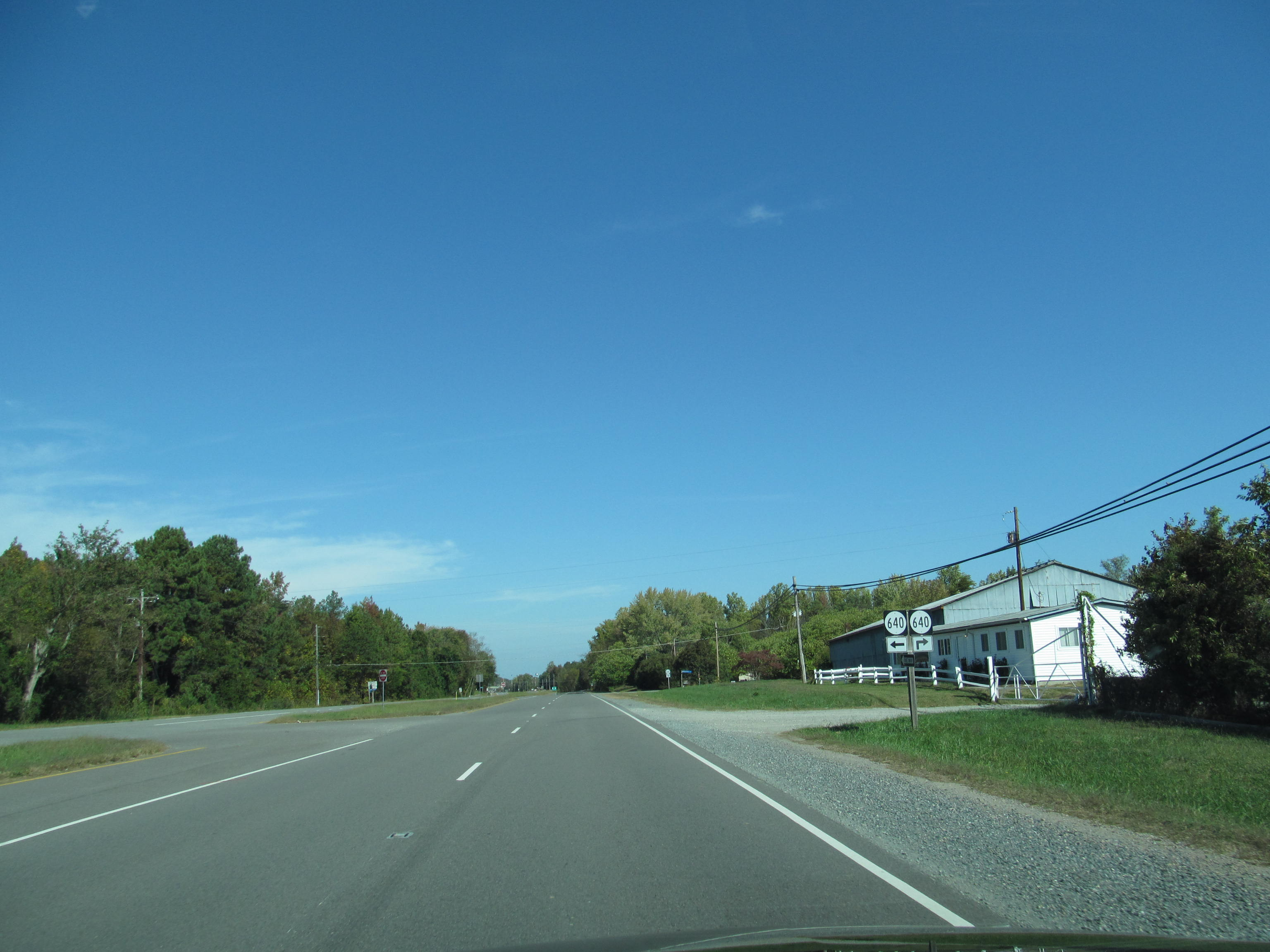
Northbound US 301/VA 2 approaching the short overlap with VSR 640 in Wrightsville.

Wrightsville is an unincorporated community in Caroline County, in the U.S. state of Virginia. It is located along US 301/VA 2 south of Bowling Green.
