= Virginia State Route 219 =

The following highways in Virginia have been known as State Route 219:

- State Route 219 (Virginia 1930-1933), Ferrum to Boones Mill
- State Route 219 (Virginia 1933), 1933 – late 1930s, spur of State Route 30 to Chelsea Plantation
- U.S. Route 219#Virginia, late 1930s – present
