= Virginia State Route 207 =

State highway in Caroline County, Virginia, US

State Route 207

Route information
- Maintained by VDOT
- Length: 11.93 mi (19.20 km)
- Existed: 1933–present

Major junctions
- West end: US 1 / SR 658 in Ruther Glen
- I-95 in Ruther Glen
- East end: US 301 / SR 2 in Bowling Green

Location
- Country: United States
- State: Virginia
- Counties: Caroline

Highway system
- Virginia Routes; Interstate; US; Primary; Secondary; Byways; History; HOT lanes
| ← SR 206 | → SR 208 |

State Route 207 (SR 207) is a primary state highway in the U.S. state of Virginia. Known for most of its length as Rogers Clark Boulevard, the state highway runs 11.93 miles (19.20 km) from U.S. Route 1 (US 1) in Ruther Glen east to US 301 and SR 2 in Bowling Green. SR 207 is a divided highway connection between Interstate 95 (I-95) north of Richmond and US 301, which heads toward Fort A.P. Hill, the Northern Neck, and the Potomac River Bridge to Southern Maryland.

== Route description ==
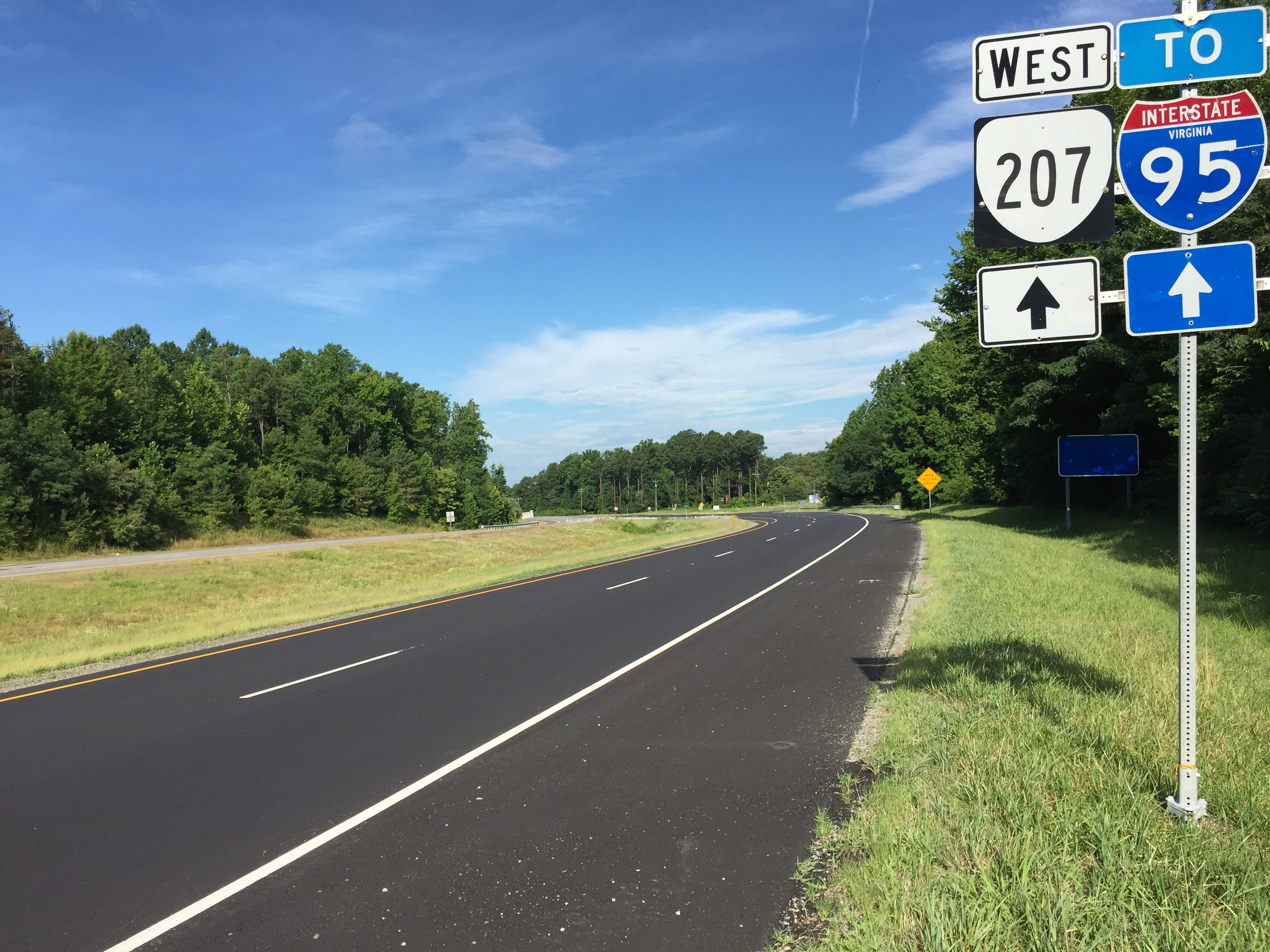
View west along SR 207 at SR 207 Bus. near Bowling Green

SR 207 begins at an intersection with US 1 (Emancipation Highway) in Ruther Glen, in an area also known as Carmel Church, in western Caroline County. The state highway heads east as Rogers Clark Boulevard, a four-lane divided highway that passes through a commercial area with services catering to travellers. Within the commercial area, SR 207 has a partial cloverleaf interchange with I-95. East of Ruther Glen, the state highway heads northeast toward Bowling Green. SR 207 crosses over CSX's RF&P Subdivision railroad line and the Mattaponi River north of the village of Milford. Southwest of Bowling Green, the state highway meets the western end of SR 207 Business, which takes the name Rogers Clark Boulevard toward the town of Bowling Green. SR 207 continues east as the Bowling Green Bypass to the route's eastern terminus. The state highway crosses over US 301 and SR 2 (Richmond Turnpike) and ends at a two-way ramp between the north–south road and the bypass. The Bowling Green Bypass continues northeast as US 301 toward Fort A.P. Hill. The two-way ramp, which is part of US 301, leads to the Richmond Turnpike, which heads south toward Richmond as US 301 and SR 2 and north into the town of Bowling Green as SR 2 and US 301 Business.

== History ==

Under a previous numbering system, SR 207 was known as State Route 613 from 1929-1933. This SR 613 initially ran only from US 1 at Carmel Church to the Mattaponi River but, in 1930-31, was extended east to the current US 301 Business and SR 2 intersection in Bowling Green. The route was renumbered in 1933 as SR 207, which itself had been a previous designation of part of what is now SR 24 near Roanoke. In addition to the current path of SR 207, the 1933 route included what is now SR 639 in Caroline County from Chilesburg to Ladysmith but this was renumbered as SR 229 by 1937. The route was enlarged by 1937 with the addition of a second section running from a point 2 miles (3.2 km) east of Bowling Green through Port Royal to an intersection with SR 3 at Office Hall. Part of this route had been SR 229 from 1933. In 1941, this new section became part of US 301 which it remains today.

== Major intersections ==
The entire route is in Caroline County.

| Location | mi | km | Destinations | Notes |
|---|---|---|---|---|
| Carmel Church | 0.00 | 0.00 | US 1 (Jefferson Davis Highway) / SR 658 (Jericho Road) – Richmond, Fredericksburg, Washington, D.C. | Western terminus |
| | 0.46 | 0.74 | I-95 – Fredericksburg, Richmond | Exit 104 (I-95) |
| Milford | 10.48 | 16.87 | SR 207 Bus. east (Rogers Clark Boulevard) to SR 2 – Bowling Green, Fredericksburg | Western terminus of SR 207 Bus. |
| Bowling Green | 11.93 | 19.20 | US 301 (Bowling Green Bypass) – Port Royal, Baltimore, Richmond, Fort A.P. Hill | Eastern terminus |
1.000 mi = 1.609 km; 1.000 km = 0.621 mi

== Bowling Green business route ==
State Route 207 Business
- Location: Bowling Green
- Length: 1.27 mi (2.04 km)

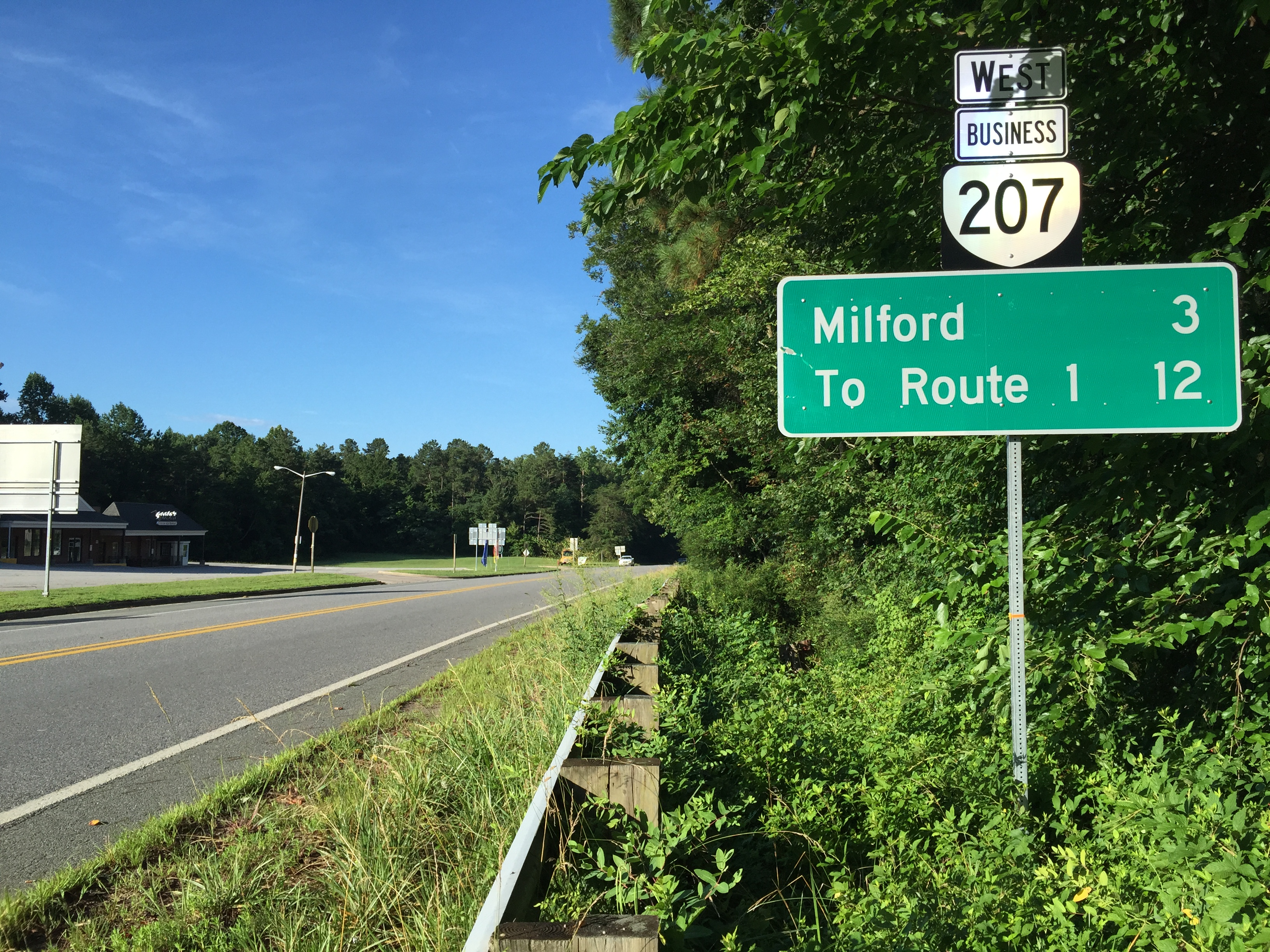
View west at the east end of SR 207 Bus. at US 301 Bus. and SR 2 in Bowling Green

State Route 207 Business (SR 207 Business) is a business route of SR 207 in Bowling Green. The two-lane highway, which has a length of 1.27 miles (2.04 km), begins at SR 207, which heads west as Rogers Clark Boulevard and east as the Bowling Green Bypass. SR 207 Business heads northeast as Rogers Clark Boulevard and becomes Broaddus Avenue on entering the town limits of Bowling Green. The business route reaches its eastern terminus at SR 2 (Main Street). US 301 Business also heads south on Main Street and east on Broaddus Avenue to its northern end between Bowling Green and Fort A.P. Hill.

| < SR 612 | District 6 State Routes; 1928–1933 | SR 614 > |
