= VA2 =

VA-2 may refer to:

- Virginia State Route 2
- Virginia's 2nd congressional district
