= Port Richmond =

Port Richmond may refer to:

== Places ==
- Port Richmond, Philadelphia, Pennsylvania, United States
- Port Richmond, Staten Island, United States
- Port Richmond, Virginia, United States

== Transportation ==
- Port of Richmond, in Richmond, Virginia, United States
- Port of Richmond, California, in Richmond, California, United States
- Port Richmond (Staten Island Railway station)
