= Jericho School =

- U.S. National Register of Historic Places
- Virginia Landmarks Register
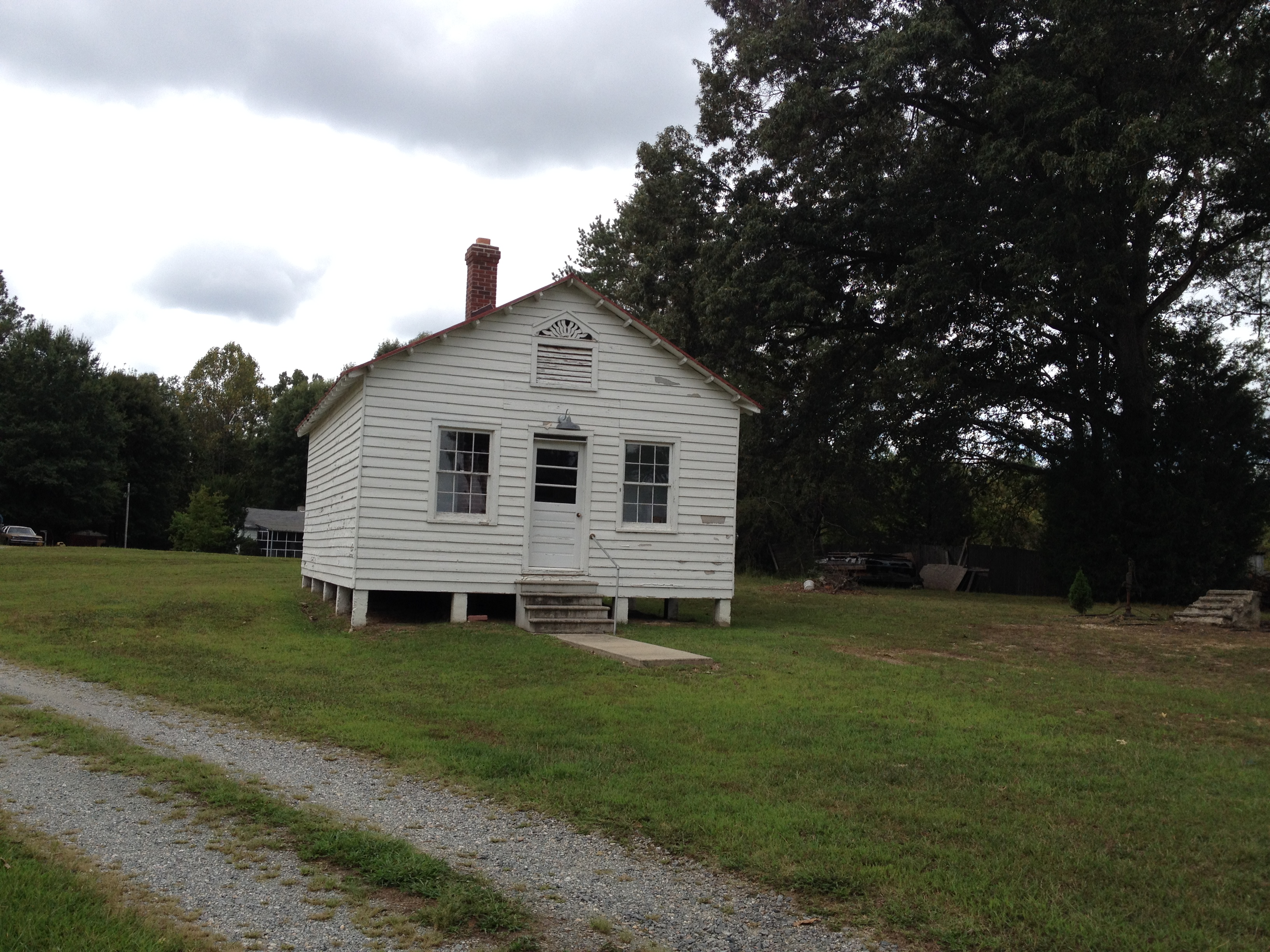

- Location within Virginia Location within the United States
- Location: Jericho Rd., Ruther Glen, Virginia
- Coordinates: 37°55′45″N 77°30′42″W
- Area: 1 acre (0.40 ha)
- Built: 1917
- NRHP reference No.: 04000041
- VLR No.: 016-5014

Significant dates
- Added to NRHP: February 11, 2004
- Designated VLR: December 3, 2003

Jericho School is a historic one-room school building located at Ruther Glen, Caroline County, Virginia.

Madison Public School District Trustees purchased land to construct a school to educate local African American children in 1885 and soon built a log structure. The current building was built in 1917 and is a one-story, rectangular frame building with a gable roof. Between 1912 and 1924 Caroline County built or remodeled 13 two-room and 22 single room schools for African American students. This one room building is sheathed in weatherboard and has a decorative vent on the front gable end.

The Jericho School served the African-American children (initially grades 1 to 7, later 1 through 4) of this area of Caroline County until 1959, when Union Elementary School was built.

Caroline County sold the building at public auction in 1962. In May 2001 Historic Jericho School, Inc. was formed to save the school.

It was listed on the National Register of Historic Places in 2004.
