= History of state highways in Virginia =

- Primary and secondary State Route shields

- The system used from 1923 to 1928 involved two-digit routes (red) with three- and four-digit spurs (orange). District 1 (Bristol) is shown here.

System information
- Length: 57,867 mi (93,128 km)
- Notes: Outside cities, some towns, and two counties, every road is state-maintained. These roads are split into primary and secondary State Routes, and receive different levels of funding. Inside cities, most primary State Routes are locally maintained.

Highway names
- Interstates: Interstate X (I-X)
- US Highways: U.S. Route X (US X)
- State: State Route X (SR X) or Virginia Route X (VA X)

System links
- Virginia Routes; Interstate; US; Primary; Secondary; Byways; History; HOT lanes

The History of State Highways in Virginia begins with Virginia's State Highway Commission, which was formed by the General Assembly in 1906. In 1918 the General Assembly designated a 4002-mile (6441 km) state highway system to be maintained by the commission. Beginning in 1922, the commission was authorized to add annually mileage equal to 2.5% of the original system (100 miles or 161 km). These highways were numbered from 1 into the 20s; by 1922 suffixed spurs had been added (such as 7X from 7). In 1923, the first renumbering was implemented, in which State Routes 1 to 9 became 31 to 39. The spurs were renamed to use numbers rather than letters (such as 114 from 11), and four-digit numbers were used for spurs of spurs (such as 1141 from 114) or for "rollovers" (such as 1010 from 10, as 101 to 109 were all in use).

The United States Numbered Highways were designated in late 1926. In 1928, the state routes were renumbered again; all the spurs were instead numbered by district, using the district number as the first digit. State routes that were also U.S. Routes had signage removed, but continued to be referred to by the Department of Highways (renamed from the State Highway Commission in 1927).

In 1932, the Byrd Road Act promoted by former Governor Harry F. Byrd and the Byrd Organization created the state's "Secondary System" of roads in the counties. Virginia's incorporated towns were provided a local option to participate, and all the counties in Virginia were given the option of turning this responsibility over to the state. However, Virginia's independent cities were excluded, typical of the Byrd Organization and its leader's rural priorities and political power base.

Only four counties of more than 90 initially opted not to join the system. Of these, Nottoway County opted to join the state system in 1933, and in the 1950s, Warwick County became an independent city and was then consolidated with another, forming the modern City of Newport News. (By the end of the 20th century, only Arlington and Henrico Counties were continuing to maintain their own roads.)

Generally, when an area became part of an independent city, through annexation, merger, consolidation, or conversions, the secondary roads passed from the state system to local responsibility. An exception was made by the General Assembly in the former Nansemond County, which like Warwick County, became an independent city (in 1972) and then 18 months later, consolidated with neighboring Suffolk in 1974. Under that special arrangement, VDOT maintained secondary routes in Suffolk until July 1, 2006. This arrangement eventually led to new conflicts over ownership and responsibility for the circa 1928 Kings Highway Bridge across the Nansemond River on State Route 125, which was closed in 2005 by VDOT for safety reasons.

The DoT took over road maintenance from most counties in 1932, forming the state secondary system. These routes were assigned numbers from 600 up, so the primary routes were renumbered again in 1933, assigning smaller ranges to each district. State routes with numbers that conflicted with U.S. Routes were renumbered, and the unsigned concurrencies were dropped. The numbers from 2 to 9 were again assigned (1 was not because of U.S. Route 1):

- State Route 2: State Route 50
- State Route 3: State Routes 37 and 827
- State Route 4: Many routes, including part of State Route 17
- State Route 5: State Route 41, part of State Route 39, and State Route 835
- State Route 6: Part of State Route 18 and State Route 19
- State Route 7: Parts of State Routes 37 and 54 and all of State Route 822
- State Route 8: State Route 23
- State Route 9: State Route 25

State Route 10 is the smallest number to survive from the 1918 system to the present day, though in a greatly modified form. State Route 35 is largely the same as the original SR 5, renumbered in 1923.

Two more renumberings took place in 1940, when routes ending at state lines were renumbered to match the adjacent state, and in 1958, when routes with numbers used for Interstate Highways were renumbered.

== Historic lists of routes ==
=== 1918-1923 ===
- State Route 1
- State Route 2
- State Route 3
- State Route 4
- State Route 5
- State Route 6
- State Route 7
- State Route 8
- State Route 9
- State Route 10
- State Route 11
- State Route 12
- State Route 13
- State Route 14
- State Route 16
- State Route 17
- State Route 18
- State Route 19
- State Route 20
- State Route 21
- State Route 22
- State Route 23
- State Route 24
- State Route 25
- State Route 26
- State Route 27
- State Route 28

=== 1923-1928 ===
- State Route 10
  - SR 101: 1923 - 1928
  - SR 102: 1923 - 1928
  - SR 103: 1923 - 1928
  - SR 104: 1923 - 1928
  - SR 105: 1923 - 1928
  - SR 106: 1923 - 1928
  - SR 107: 1923 - 1928
  - SR 108: 1923 - 1928
  - SR 109: 1923 - 1928
  - SR 1010: 1924 - 1928
  - SR 1011: 1924 - 1928
  - SR 1012: 1924 - 1928
- State Route 11
  - SR 111: 1923 - 1928
  - SR 112: 1923 - 1928
  - SR 113: 1923 - 1928
  - SR 114: 1923 - 1928
    - SR 1141: 1923 - 1928
  - SR 115: 1923 - 1928
  - SR 116: 1923 - 1928
  - SR 117: 1923 - 1926, 1926 - 1928
  - SR 118: 1924 - 1928
  - SR 119: 1924 - 1926, 1926 - 1928
- State Route 12
  - SR 121: 1923 - mid-1920s, 1927 - 1928
  - SR 122: 1923 - mid-1920s, 1925 - 1928
  - SR 123: 1923 - 1928
  - State Route 124
  - SR 125: 1924 - 1928
- State Route 13
  - SR 131: 1923 - 1928
  - SR 132: 1923 - 1928
  - SR 133: 1926 - 1928
- State Route 14
  - SR 141: 1923 - 1928
  - SR 142: 1923 - mid-1920s
  - SR 143: 1923 - 1928
  - State Route 144
- State Route 15
- State Route 16
- State Route 17
  - SR 171: 1923 - 1928
  - SR 172: 1923 - mid-1920s
- State Route 18
  - SR 181: 1924 - 1928
  - SR 182: 1927 - 1928
- State Route 19
  - SR 191: 1927 - 1928
- State Route 20
  - State Route 201
  - State Route 202
- State Route 21
  - State Route 211
  - State Route 212
  - SR 213: 1924 - mid-1920s
- State Route 22
  - State Route 221
- State Route 23
  - SR 231: 1924 - 1928
  - State Route 232
- State Route 24
- State Route 25
  - SR 251: 1924 - mid-1920s, mid-1920s - 1928
- State Route 26
- State Route 27
- State Route 28
- State Route 29
  - State Route 291
- State Route 30
- State Route 31
  - State Route 311
    - State Route 3111
  - SR 312: 1923 - 1928
  - SR 313: 1924 - 1928
  - SR 314: 1924 - 1925, mid-1920s, 1926 - 1928
  - State Route 315
  - State Route 316
- State Route 32
  - SR 321: 1923 - 1927
  - SR 322: 1923 - 1926
  - State Route 323
  - SR 324: mid-1920s - unknown
  - SR 325: 1923 - 1926
  - State Route 326
  - SR 327: 1925 - mid-1920s
- State Route 33
  - State Route 331
  - SR 332: 1924 - 1928
  - SR 333: 1924 - 1928
  - State Route 334
  - SR 335: 1924 - 1928
  - State Route 336
  - SR 337: 1925 - 1928
  - State Route 338
  - SR 339: 1927 - 1928
- State Route 34
  - SR 341: 1923 - 1928
  - SR 342: 1923 - 1928
  - SR 343: 1926 - 1928
- State Route 35
  - SR 351: 1924 - 1928
- State Route 36
  - State Route 361
- State Route 37
  - SR 371: 1923 - 1928
  - SR 372: 1923 - 1928
  - SR 373: 1923 - 1928
  - SR 374: 1923 - 1928
  - SR 375: 1925 - 1928
  - State Route 376
  - SR 377: 1927 - 1928
- State Route 38
- State Route 39
  - SR 391: 1923 - 1928
  - SR 392: 1923 - 1928
  - SR 393: 1923 - 1928
  - SR 394: 1923 - 1928
  - SR 395: 1924 - 1928
  - State Route 396
  - SR 397: 1926 - 1928
- State Route 40
- State Route 41

=== 1928-1933 ===
- State Route 10
- State Route 11
- State Route 12
- State Route 13
- State Route 14
- State Route 15
- State Route 16
- State Route 17
- State Route 18
- State Route 19
- State Route 20
- State Route 21
- State Route 22
- State Route 23
- State Route 24
- State Route 25
- State Route 26
- State Route 27
- State Route 28
- State Route 29
- State Route 30
- State Route 31
- State Route 32
- State Route 33
- State Route 34
- State Route 35
- State Route 36
- State Route 37
- State Route 38
- State Route 39
- State Route 40
- State Route 41
- State Route 42
- State Route 43
- State Route 44
- State Route 45
- State Route 46
- State Route 47
- State Route 48
- State Route 49
- State Route 50
- State Route 51
- State Route 52
- State Route 53
- State Route 54
- State Route 55
- State Route 56
- State Route 57
- State Route 58
- State Route 59

==== District 1 ====
- SR 100: 1928 - 1933
- SR 101: 1928 - 1933
- SR 102: 1928 - 1933
- SR 103: 1928 - 1933
- SR 104: 1928 - 1933
- SR 105: 1928 - early 1930s
- SR 106: 1928 - 1933
- SR 107: 1928 - 1933
- SR 108: 1928 - 1933
- SR 109: 1928 - 1933
- SR 110: 1928 - 1933
- SR 111: 1928 - 1933
- SR 112: 1928 - 1933
- SR 113: 1928 - 1933
- SR 114: 1928 - 1933
- SR 115: 1928 - 1933
- SR 116: 1928 - 1930, 1930 - early 1930s
- SR 117: 1928 - 1933
- SR 118: 1928 - 1933
- SR 119: 1928 - 1933
- SR 120: 1928 - 1933
- SR 121: 1928 - 1933
- SR 122: 1928 - 1933
- SR 123: 1928 - 1933
- SR 124: 1928 - early 1930s
- SR 125: 1928 - early 1930s
- SR 126: 1928 - 1933
- SR 127: 1928 - 1933
- SR 128: 1928 - 1933
- SR 129: 1928 - 1933
- SR 130: 1928 - 1933
- SR 131: 1928 - 1933
- SR 132: 1930 - 1933
- SR 133: 1930 - 1933
- SR 134: 1930 - 1933
- SR 135: 1930 - 1933
- SR 136: 1930 - 1933
- SR 137: 1930 - 1933
- SR 138: 1930 - 1933
- SR 139: 1931 - 1933

==== District 2 ====
- State Route 200
- State Route 201
- State Route 202
- State Route 203
- State Route 204
- State Route 205
- SR 206: 1928 - 1930, 1930 - 1933
- State Route 207
- State Route 208
- State Route 209
- State Route 210
- State Route 211
- State Route 212
- State Route 213
- State Route 214
- State Route 215
- State Route 216
- State Route 217
- State Route 218
- State Route 219
- State Route 220
- State Route 221
- State Route 222
- State Route 223
- State Route 224
- State Route 225
- State Route 226
- State Route 227
- SR 228: 1932 - 1933

==== District 3 ====
- State Route 300
- State Route 301
- SR 302: 1928 - 1930, 1930 - 1931
- State Route 303
- State Route 304
- State Route 305
- State Route 306
- State Route 307
- State Route 308
- State Route 309
- State Route 310
- State Route 311
- State Route 312
- State Route 313
- State Route 314
- State Route 315
- State Route 316
- State Route 317
- State Route 318
- State Route 319
- State Route 320
- State Route 321
- State Route 322

==== District 4 ====
- State Route 400
- State Route 401
- State Route 402
- State Route 403
- State Route 404
- State Route 405
- State Route 406
- State Route 407
- State Route 408
- State Route 409
- State Route 410
- State Route 411
- State Route 412
- State Route 413
- State Route 414
- State Route 415
- State Route 416
- State Route 417
- State Route 418
- State Route 419
- State Route 420
- State Route 421
- State Route 422
- State Route 423
- State Route 424
- State Route 425
- State Route 426
- State Route 427
- State Route 428
- State Route 429
- State Route 430
- State Route 431
- State Route 432
- State Route 433
- State Route 434
- State Route 435
- State Route 436
- State Route 437
- State Route 438
- State Route 439
- State Route 440

==== District 5 ====
- SR 500: 1928 - 1933
- SR 501: 1928 - early 1930s, early 1930s - 1933
- SR 502: 1928 - 1933
- SR 503: 1928 - 1933
- SR 504: 1928 - 1933
- SR 505: 1928 - 1933
- SR 506: 1928 - 1933
- SR 507: 1928 - 1933
- SR 508: 1928 - 1933
- SR 509: 1928 - 1933
- SR 510: 1928 - 1933
- SR 511: 1928 - 1933
- SR 512: 1928 - 1933
- SR 513: 1928 - 1933
- SR 514: 1928 - 1933
- SR 515: 1928 - 1933
- SR 516: 1928 - 1933
- SR 517: 1928 - 1933
- SR 518: 1928 - 1933
- SR 519: 1928 - 1933
- SR 520: 1928 - 1933
- SR 521: 1928 - 1933
- SR 522: 1928 - 1933
- SR 523: 1928 - 1933
- SR 524: 1928 - 1933
- SR 525: 1928 - 1933
- SR 526: 1929 - 1933
- SR 527: 1929 - 1930, 1930 - 1933
- SR 528: 1929 - 1933
- SR 529: 1930 - 1933
- SR 530: 1930, 1930 - 1932, 1932 - 1933
- SR 531: 1930 - 1933
- SR 532: 1930 - 1933
- SR 533: 1930 - 1933
- SR 534: 1930 - early 1930s
- SR 535: 1930 - 1933
- SR 536: 1930 - 1933
- SR 537: 1930 - 1933
- SR 538: 1930 - 1933
- SR 539: 1930 - 1933
- SR 540: 1931 - 1933
- SR 541: 1931 - 1933
- SR 542: 1932 - 1933

==== District 6 ====
- State Route 600
- State Route 601
- State Route 602
- State Route 603
- State Route 604
- State Route 605
- State Route 606
- State Route 607
- State Route 608
- State Route 609
- State Route 610
- State Route 611
- State Route 612
- State Route 613
- State Route 614
- State Route 615
- State Route 616
- State Route 617
- State Route 618
- State Route 619
- State Route 620
- State Route 621
- State Route 622
- State Route 623
- State Route 624
- State Route 625
- State Route 626
- State Route 627
- State Route 628
- State Route 629
- State Route 630
- State Route 631
- State Route 632

==== District 7 ====
- SR 700: 1928 - 1933
- SR 701: 1928 - 1933
- SR 702: 1928 - 1933
- SR 703: 1928 - early 1930s
- SR 704: 1928 - 1933
- SR 705: 1928 - 1933
- SR 706: 1928 - 1933
- SR 707: 1928 - 1933
- SR 708: 1928 - 1933
- SR 709: 1928 - 1933
- SR 710: 1928 - 1933
- SR 711: 1928 - 1933
- SR 712: 1928 - 1933
- SR 713: 1928 - 1933
- SR 714: 1930 - 1933
- SR 715: 1930 - 1933
- SR 716: 1930 - 1933
- SR 717: 1930 - 1933
- SR 718: 1930 - early 1930s, 1932 - 1933
- SR 719: 1930 - 1933
- SR 720: 1930 - 1933
- SR 721: 1930 - 1933
- SR 722: 1930 - 1933
- SR 723: 1930 - 1933
- SR 724: 1931 - early 1930s
- SR 725: 1931 - 1933
- SR 726: 1931 - 1933
- SR 727: 1931 - 1933

==== District 8 ====
- State Route 800
- State Route 801
- State Route 802
- State Route 803
- State Route 804
- State Route 805
- State Route 806
- State Route 807
- State Route 808
- State Route 809
- State Route 810
- State Route 811
- State Route 812
- State Route 813
- State Route 814
- State Route 815
- State Route 816
- State Route 817
- State Route 818
- State Route 819
- State Route 820
- State Route 821
- State Route 822
- State Route 823
- State Route 824
- State Route 825
- State Route 826
- State Route 827
- State Route 828
- State Route 829
- State Route 830
- State Route 831
- State Route 832
- State Route 833
- State Route 834
- State Route 835
- State Route 836
- State Route 837
- State Route 838
- State Route 839
