= Caroline County Public Schools =

Caroline County Public Schools may refer to:

- Caroline County Public Schools (Maryland)
- Caroline County Public Schools (Virginia)
