= Lake Caroline, Virginia =

- Census-designated place
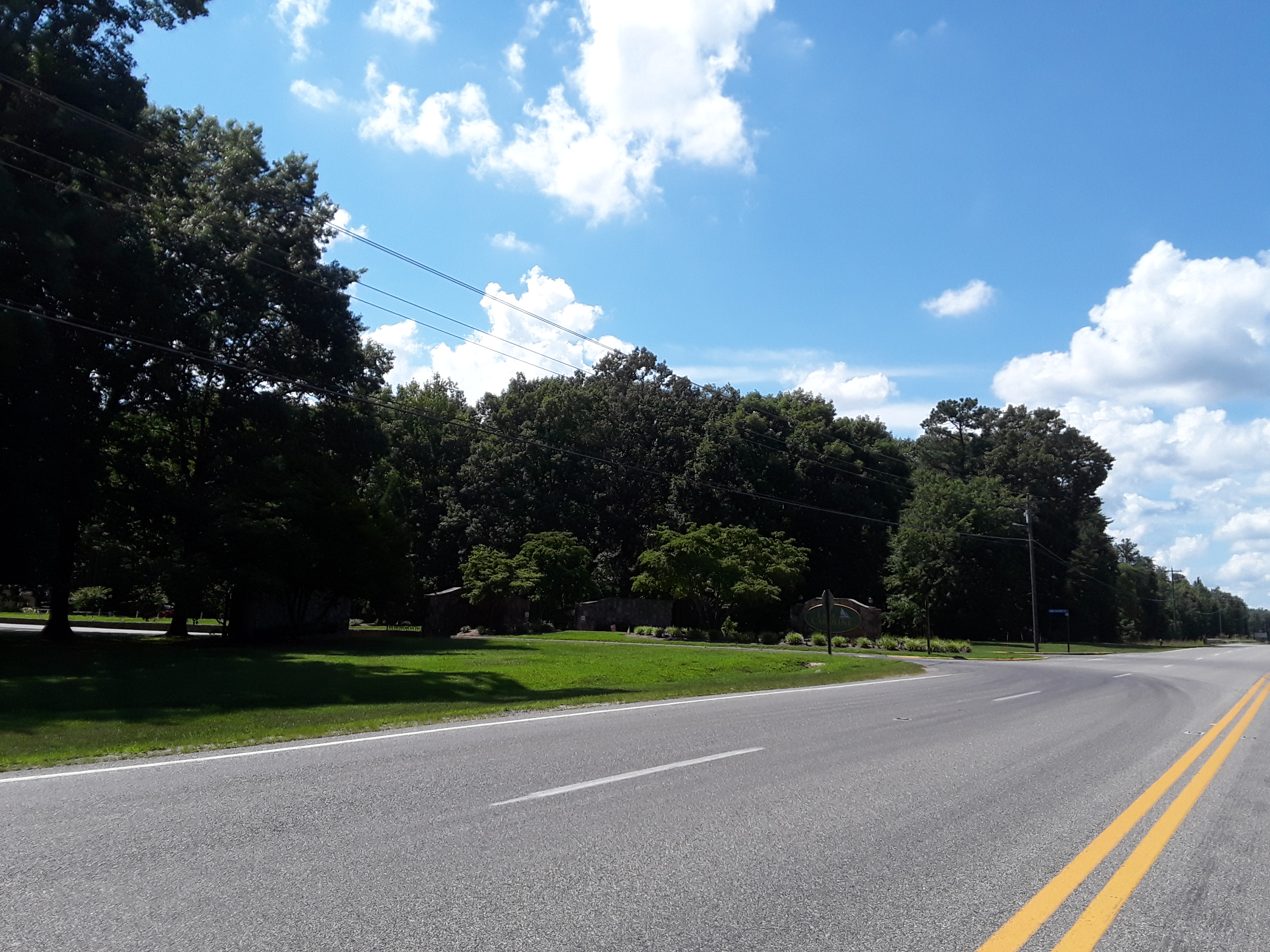
- Entrance to the CDP off of U.S. Route 1

- Location within Virginia
- Coordinates: 37°59′16″N 77°31′15″W
- Country: United States
- State: Virginia
- County: Caroline

Area
  - Total: 3.3 sq mi (8.5 km^{2})
  - Land: 2.9 sq mi (7.4 km^{2})
  - Water: 0.42 sq mi (1.1 km^{2})
- Elevation: 230 ft (70 m)

Population (2010)
  - Total: 2,260
  - Density: 796/sq mi (307.5/km^{2})
- Time zone: UTC−5 (Eastern (EST))
  - Summer (DST): UTC−4 (EDT)
- ZIP code: 22546
- FIPS code: 51-43359
- GNIS feature ID: 2630780
- Website: www.lakecaroline.net

Lake Caroline is a census-designated place in Caroline County, Virginia, United States. The population as of the 2020 census was 2,511.

It is a gated lakeside subdivision located approximately 2 miles (3 km) south of Ladysmith and 10 miles (16 km) north of Doswell. The CDP is bordered by U.S. Route 1 on the east, Cedar Fork Road on the south, and State Route 683 on the north.

== Demographics ==
Historical population
Census	Pop.	Note	%±
2010	2,260		—
2020	2,511		11.1%
U.S. Decennial Census; 2010 2020

Lake Caroline was first listed as a census designated place in the 2010 U.S. census.
