= Virginia State Route 50 =

The following highways in Virginia have been known as State Route 50:

- State Route 50 (Virginia 1928-1933), now mostly State Route 2
- U.S. Route 50 (Virginia), 1926 - present

== See also ==
- 1933 Virginia state highway renumbering
