= Mi$tro (rapper) =

American rapper

Mason Taylor
- Born: Stephon Manuel; January 8, 1992 (age 34); Caroline County, Virginia
- Genres: Hip hop
- Occupation: Rapper
- Years active: 2012-present
- Label: None

Stephon Manuel (born January 8, 1992), most popularly known now as Mason Taylor, is currently the VP of Brand Partnerships for Medium Creative Agency. Formally known as Mi$tro, he was first introduced as an American producer and rapper, from Caroline County, Virginia. He first gained recognition after the release of a mixtape entitled The Commonwealth II which was hosted by DJ Grady, DJ Iceberg and DJ Flatline. As a producer officially going by Mason Taylor, he recently produced "Freddy" for Fredo on the soundtrack for hit show Top Boy on Netflix.

== Career ==
In 2014, he released "The Commonwealth II" which featured hit single Bandz. XXL Magazine premiered the project with an exclusive interview, which was the start to him gaining national attention. Mi$tro then began to work with Lex Luger. During the A3C Festival, in Atlanta, Georgia, Mi$tro received a cosign from Jay Electronica. Jay Electronica was spotted wearing the MGM crewneck he received from Mi$tro's business partner, J-Real. Images of him wearing the crewneck caused the crewneck to sell out instantly.

In 2015, he signed with Ichor Music Group, under distribution of Warner Music Group. On February 16, 2015, he released his self-titled EP. After the release of the EP, Mi$tro signed with MIH Entertainment for management. MIH Entertainment is the home of rapper, King Lil G. In October 2015, Mi$tro was an official artist for A3C where he headlined the CreatiVeli showcase.

In 2016, he released a 9-track mixtape, GOLD that was executive produced by Money Montage. Respect Magazine wrote about Mi$tro's record "Gold Talk" in their With All Due RESPECT: 5 Tracks You're Sleeping On segment. Mi$tro was a special guest on King Lil G's Lost In Smoke 2 Tour.

In 2017, Mi$tro launched his production under the name Mason Taylor. He began his YouTube channel, which now has over 30 million views and over 100,000 subscribers. During this time, Mason Taylor landed his first major production credit in episode 7 of the first season of hit show On My Block on Netflix while as performing as Mi$tro.

In 2019, Mason Taylor was featured on the Top Boy Soundtrack as a producer for the single "Freddy" by Fredo. The song has peaked at #53 of the Official Charts and has gathered over 10 million streams worldwide.

As of 2021, Mason Taylor became VP of Brand Partnerships for media powerhouse, Medium Creative Agency. Serving on the management team for platinum, Grammy-nominated producer, Sonny Digital, Taylor had the privilege of "spearheading" the Last Train To Paris anniversary via Clubhouse.

== Discography ==
- The Commonwealth (2013)
- The Commonwealth II (2014)
- MI$TRO [EP] (2015)
- GOLD (Gods Only Look Down) (2016)
- On My Block - Season 1, Episode 7
- Top Boy Soundtrack
- Saks Fifth Commercial w/ Ayo and Teo
