= Ruther Glen, Virginia =

Unincorporated community in Virginia, United States

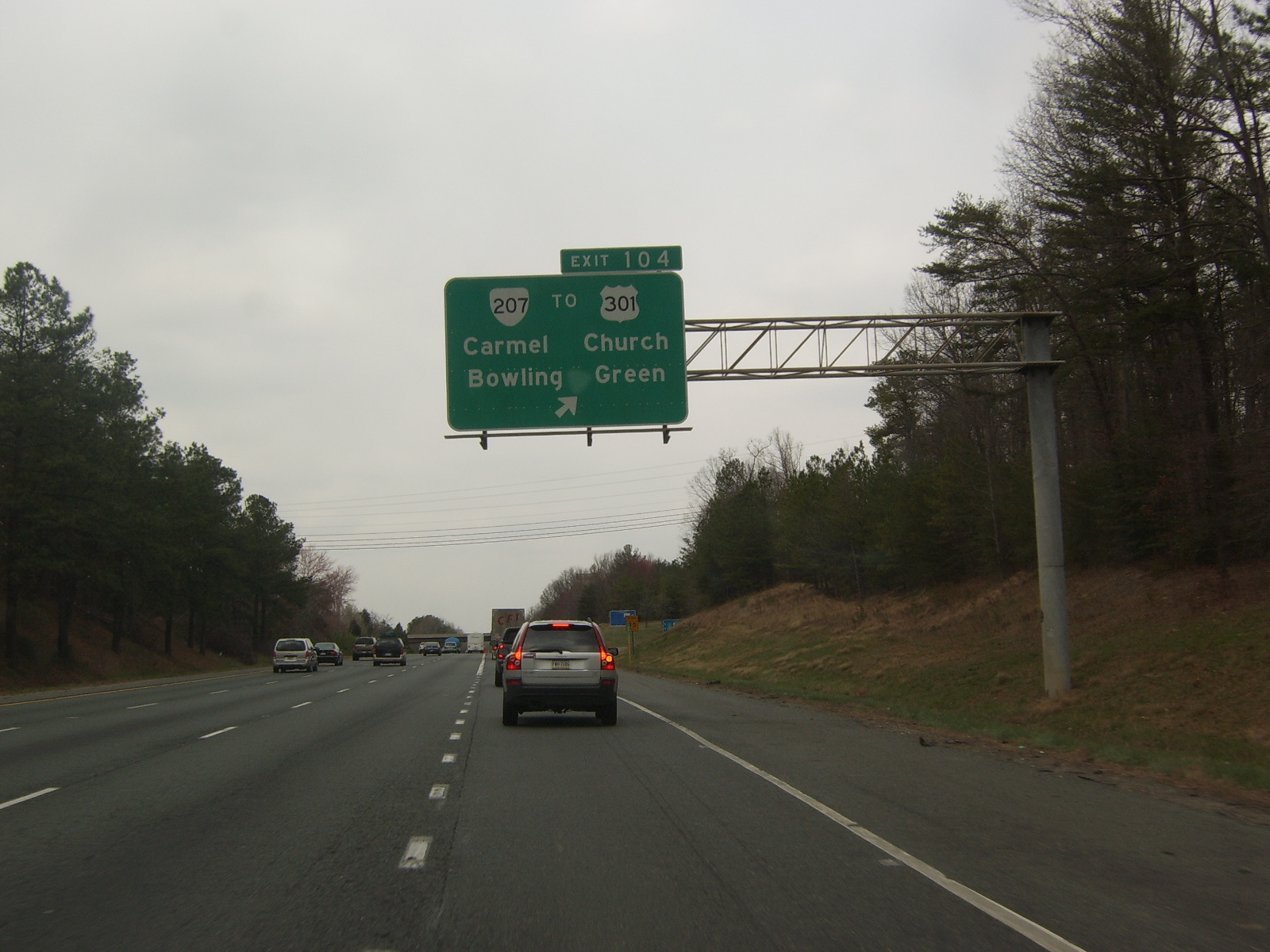
Interstate 95 approaches Virginia State Route 207 in Ruther Glen.

Ruther Glen is an unincorporated community in Caroline County, Virginia, United States, located near the interchange between Interstate 95 and Virginia State Highway 207, at 37°56′19.6152″N 77°28′17.2776″W (37.938782, -77.471466). The ZIP Code for Ruther Glen is 22546.

It is approximately 30 miles (48 km) north of Richmond. Mattaponi Springs golf course is located in the community. Numerous telemarketing organizations use phone number masking techniques to make "Ruther Glen, Virginia" appear on prospects' caller ID units.

Politician Julian M. Quarles was born near the community.

Caroline County's only private Christian school, The Carmel School, is located in Ruther Glen.

It was a stop on the Richmond, Fredericksburg and Potomac Railroad in the nineteenth century; this was replaced by CSXT. The Jericho School was listed on the National Register of Historic Places in 2004.
