= Golansville, Virginia =

Unincorporated community in Virginia, United States

Coordinates: 37°58′50″N 77°30′03″W

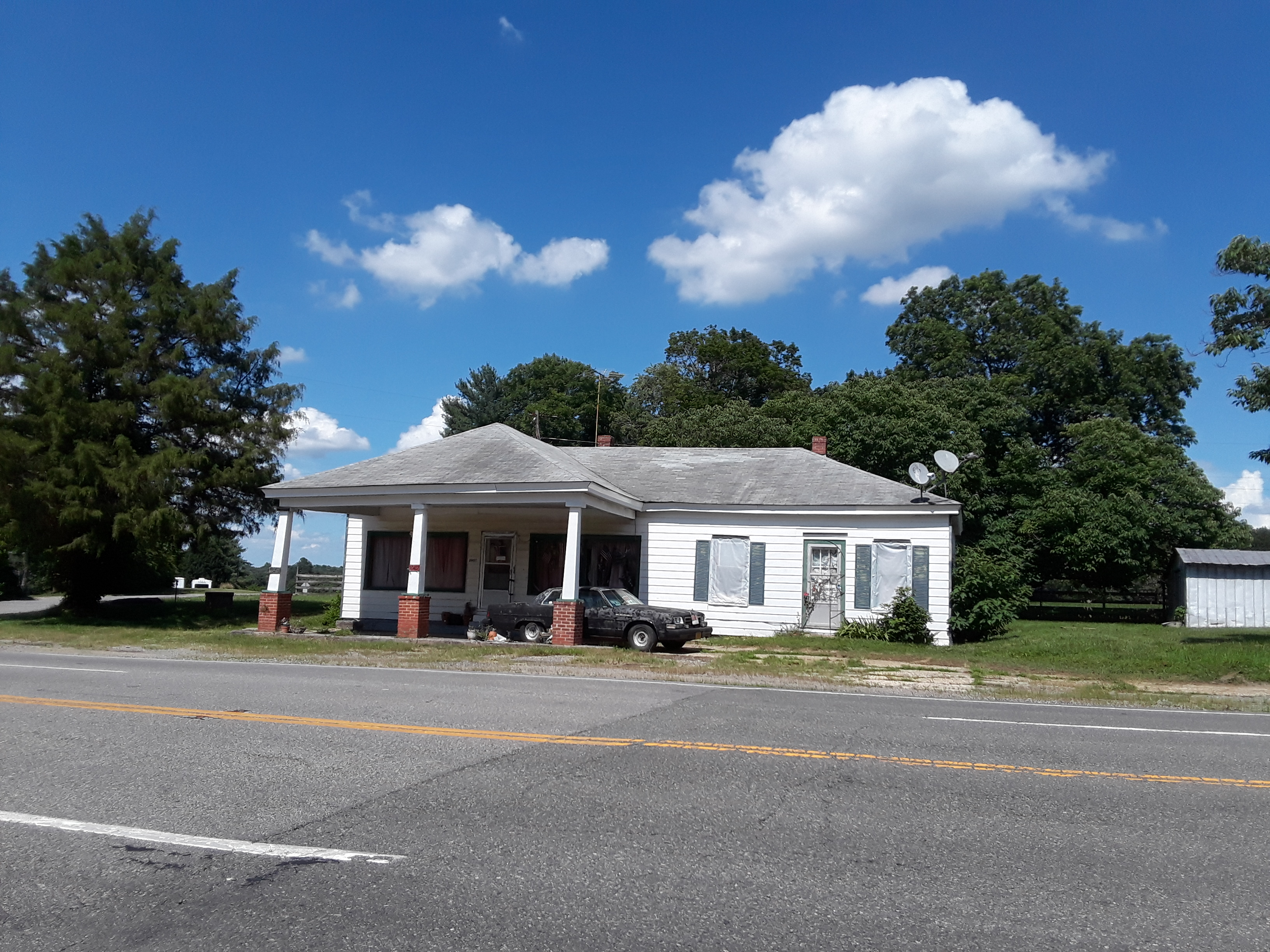
House in Golansville, July 2018

Golansville is an unincorporated community in Caroline County, in the U.S. state of Virginia. It was the site of a Quaker meetinghouse from 1739 until 1853; in 1767 members of the congregation became the first Quakers in Virginia to call for an end to slavery in the United States. Virgil Benjamin Luck (1846-1898) moved from Golansville, Virginia to Hickory Withe, Fayette County, Tennessee, where he had purchased a substantial amount of farm land.
