= Milford, Virginia =

Unincorporated community in Virginia, United States

- Unincorporated community
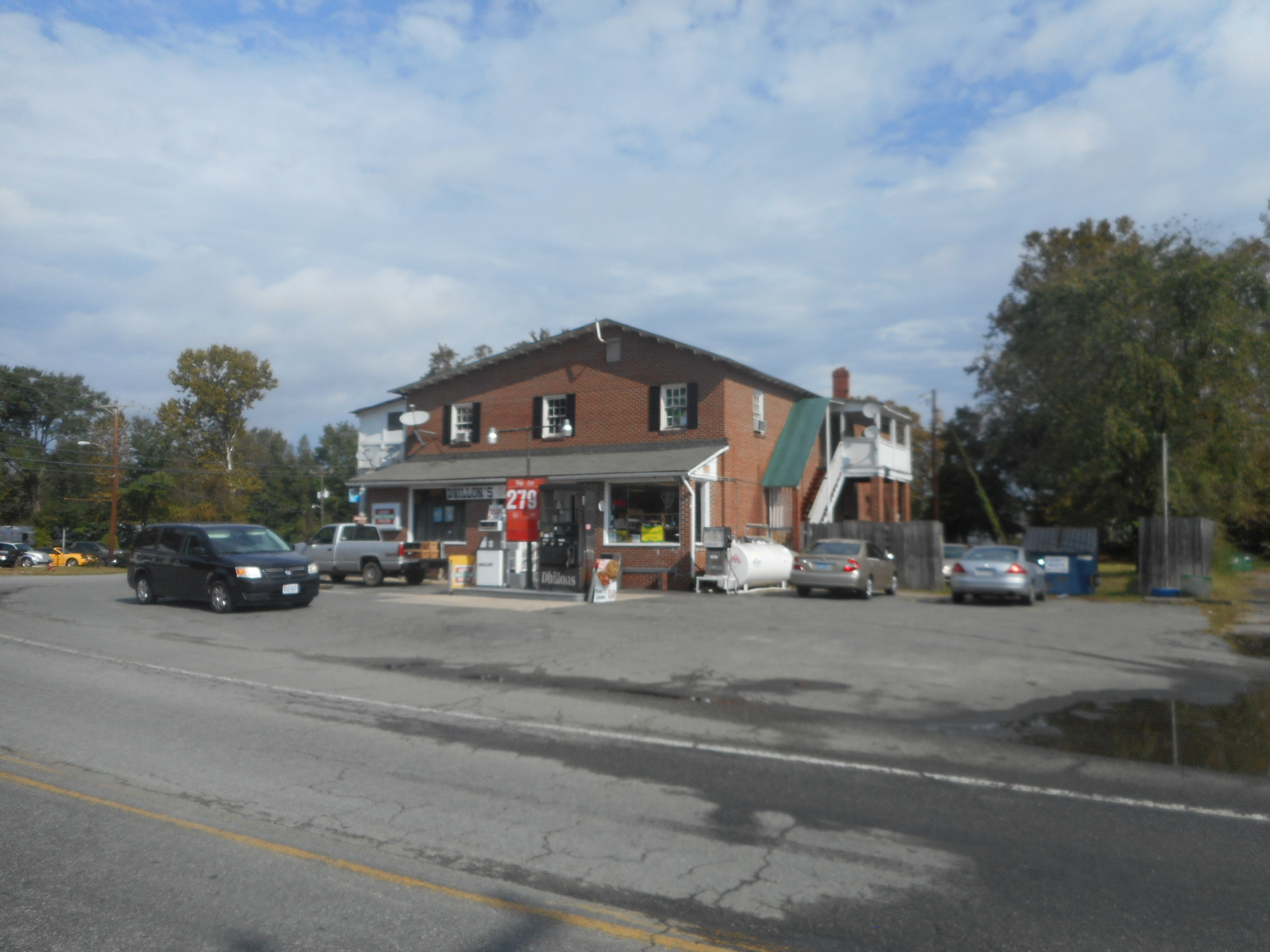
- The gas station and general store in Milford.

- Location within Virginia Location within the United States
- Coordinates: 38°01′23″N 77°22′24″W
- Country: United States
- State: Virginia
- County: Caroline
- Elevation: 98 ft (30 m)
- Time zone: UTC-5 (Eastern (EST))
  - Summer (DST): UTC-4 (EDT)
- ZIP code: 22514
- Area code: 804
- GNIS feature ID: 1493287

Milford is an unincorporated community in Caroline County, in the U.S. state of Virginia. It was a stop on the Richmond, Fredericksburg and Potomac Railroad in the nineteenth century; the railroad has since been replaced by CSXT.

Milford is west of Bowling Green along VA 207, and is home to Caroline Middle School and High School.
