= Water View, Virginia =

Unincorporated community in Virginia, United States

- Unincorporated community
- Location within Virginia Location within the United States
- Coordinates: 37°43′29″N 76°36′49″W
- Country: United States
- State: Virginia
- County: Middlesex
- Elevation: 26 ft (7.9 m)
- Time zone: UTC−5 (Eastern (EST))
  - Summer (DST): UTC−4 (EDT)
- ZIP code: 23180
- Area code: 804
- GNIS feature ID: 1500281

Water View is an unincorporated community in Middlesex County, Virginia, United States. Water View is located on the Rappahannock River, 6.4 miles (10.3 km) north-northwest of Urbanna. Water View had a post office, which closed on March 8, 2008.
