= Ladysmith, Virginia =

Unincorporated community in Virginia, United States

- Unincorporated community
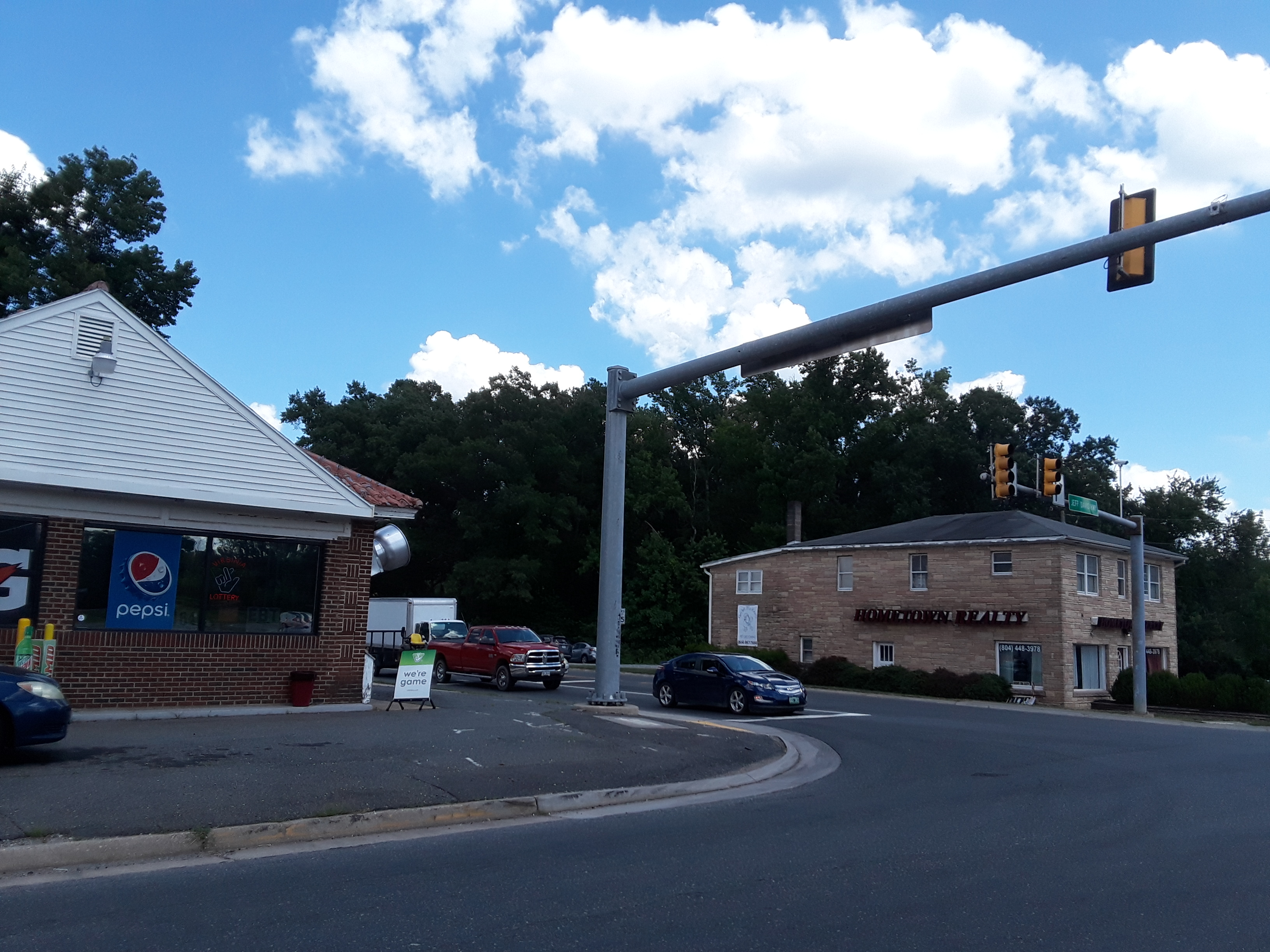
- Central intersection in Ladysmith

- Location within Virginia Location within the United States
- Coordinates: 38°01′03″N 77°30′55″W
- Country: United States
- State: Virginia
- County: Caroline
- Elevation: 230 ft (70 m)
- Time zone: UTC-5 (Eastern (EST))
  - Summer (DST): UTC-4 (EDT)
- ZIP code: 22501
- Area code: 804
- GNIS feature ID: 1469093

Ladysmith is an unincorporated community in Caroline County, in the U.S. state of Virginia. It is located along US 1 and SR 639 (former SR 229), northwest of Ruther Glen and 1 mile (1.6 km) west of I-95, exit 110. The community contains attractions such as the Pendleton Golf Club, which is addressed as being in Ruther Glen.

== History ==
A post office called Ladysmith has been in operation since 1928. The community may have been named after Ladysmith, in South Africa. A more likely scenario is that the community was given the name of Clara Smith‘s mother, original owner of the site.

In the mid-1990s, the Catholic Diocese of Richmond purchased land at 10306 Ladysmith Road to build a new church for St. Mary of the Annunciation, the parish having outgrown its previous location near Woodford. Already on the land was a cemetery of enslaved persons and their descendants, many of whom are associated with nearby St. John's Baptist Church. The place is locally known as the Oliver Cemetery, named after the family who initially owned the plantation which covered the area. Only a few remnants of headstones remain, though ground-penetrating radar has indicated that as many as 300 individuals could be buried there. As of fall 2025, a parish committee is working to remove brush, put up appropriate fencing, and install interpretive signage and a pathway to ensure safe public access.

== Notable people ==
- William Clark (born 1770 in Ladysmith), explorer and politician
