= Cedon, Virginia =

Unincorporated community in Virginia, US

Coordinates: 38°03′40″N 77°31′07″W

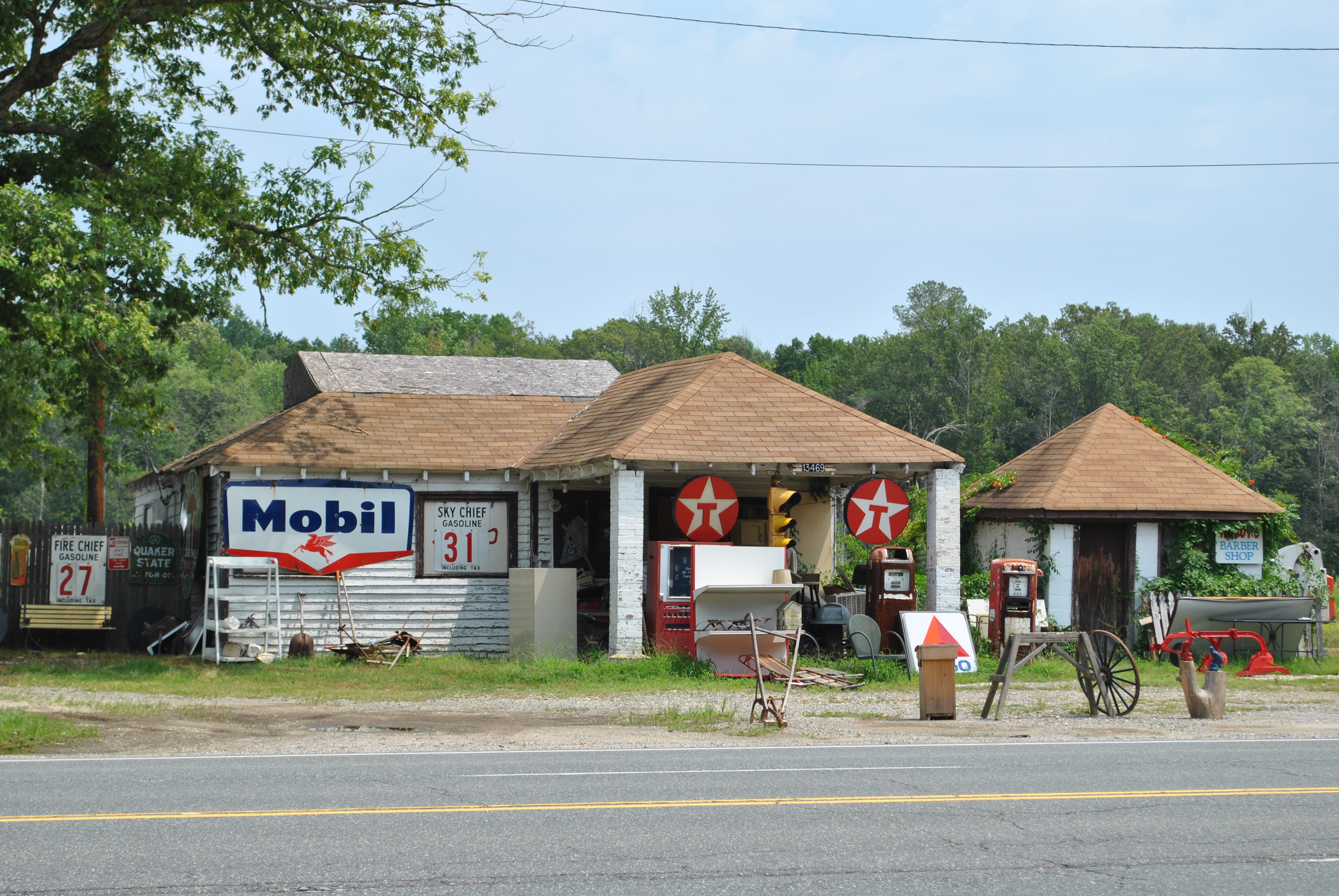
An antique shop in Cedon

Cedon is an unincorporated community in Caroline County, in the U.S. state of Virginia.
