= Mobjack, Virginia =

Unincorporated community in Virginia, United States

- Unincorporated community
- Location within Virginia Location within the United States
- Coordinates: 37°22′30″N 76°20′51″W
- Country: United States
- State: Virginia
- County: Mathews
- Elevation: 7 ft (2.1 m)
- Time zone: UTC-5 (Eastern (EST))
  - Summer (DST): UTC-4 (EDT)
- Area code: 804
- GNIS feature ID: 1497019

Mobjack is an unincorporated community in Mathews County, Virginia, United States. Mobjack is 4.5 miles (7.2 km) south-southwest of Mathews.
