= Villboro, Virginia =

Unincorporated community in Virginia, United States

Coordinates: 38°08′06″N 77°23′22″W

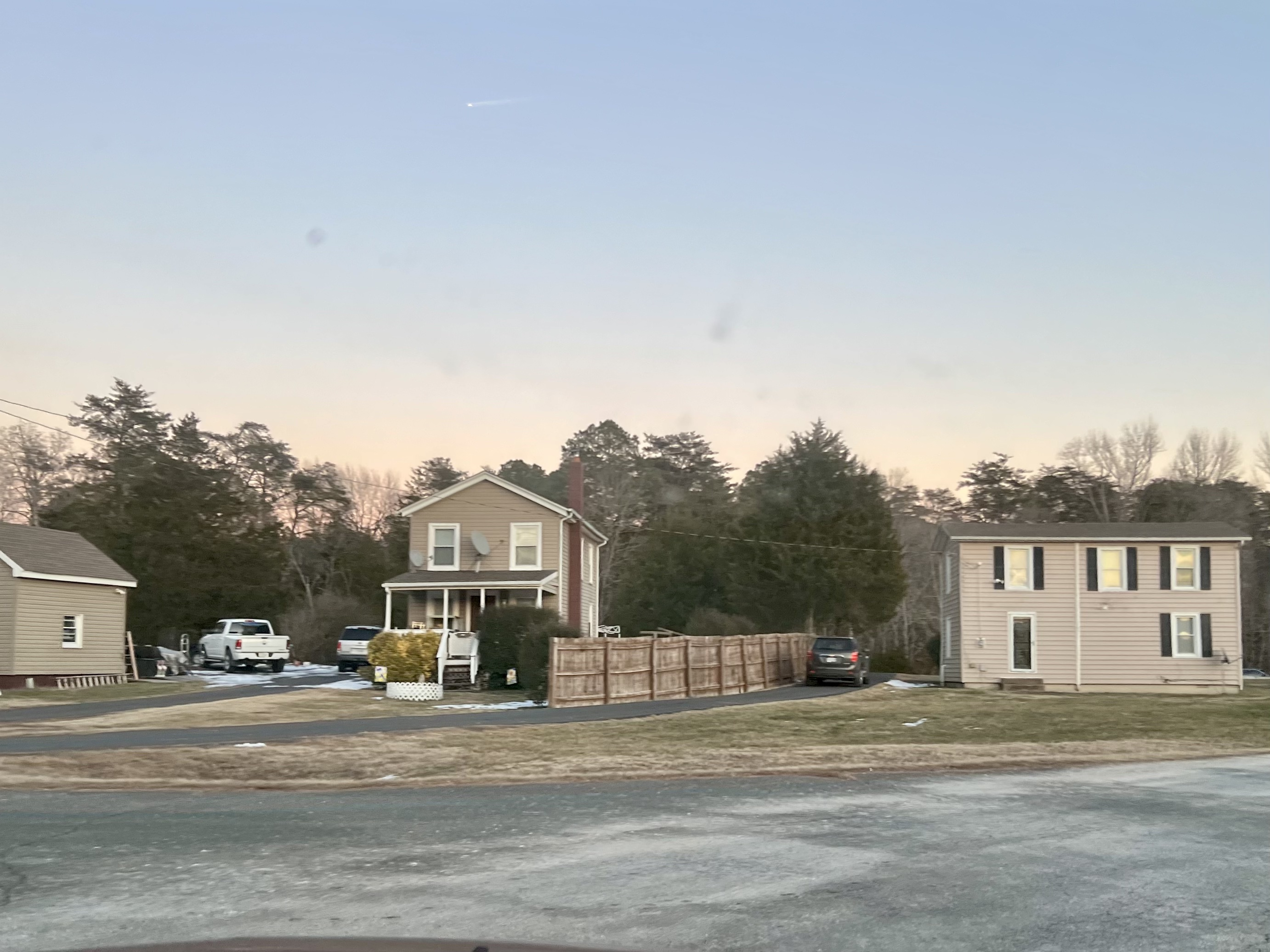

Villboro is an unincorporated community in Caroline County, in the U.S. state of Virginia.
