= Caroline County Public Schools (Virginia) =

School district in Virginia, United States

Coordinates: 38°2′17.60132″N 77°20′31.00128″W

Address
- 16261 Richmond Turnpike Bowling Green, Virginia, 22427; United States

District information
- Type: Public
- Grades: PK–12
- Superintendent: Sarah Calveric
- Chair of the board: JoWanda Rollins-Fells
- Schools: 5
- Budget: $42,797,669 (2015-16)
- NCES District ID: 5100660

Students and staff
- Students: 4,337 (2022-23)
- Teachers: 277.75 (FTE)
- Student–teacher ratio: 15.61

Other information
- Website: www.ccps.us

Caroline County Public Schools is the public school system of Caroline County, Virginia, United States. As of 2024, there are about 4,337 students enrolled in 5 schools. There are 3 elementary schools (grades PK-5), 1 middle school (grades 6-8), and 1 high school (grades 9-12).

== Administration ==
=== Superintendent ===
The current superintendent of Caroline County Public Schools is Sarah Calveric. Before being appointed superintendent, she was the assistant superintendent of Caroline County Public Schools. She was also the director of human resources for Spotsylvania County Public Schools.

=== School Board ===
- JoWanda Rollins-Fells, Chairperson
- Nancy G. Carson, Vice Chairperson
- George L. Spaulding, Jr.
- Shawn M. Kelley
- Calvin Taylor
- John I. Copeland

== Schools ==
Name	Address	Image
Caroline High School	19155 Rodgers Clark Blvd Milford, Virginia 22514	
Caroline Middle School	13325 Devils Three Jump Rd Milford, VA 22514	
Bowling Green Elementary School	17502 New Baltimore Road Milford, VA 22514	
Lewis and Clark Elementary School	18101 Clark And York Blvd Ruther Glen, VA 22546	
Madison Elementary School	9075 Chance Place, Ruther Glen, VA 22546	
