= Chilesburg, Virginia =

Unincorporated community in Virginia, United States

Coordinates: 37°59′58″N 77°35′33″W

Chilesburg is an unincorporated community in Caroline County, in the U.S. state of Virginia.
