= Port Richmond, Virginia =

RIP OZZY OSBOURNE 1948-2025

- Unincorporated community
- Location within Virginia and the United States Port Richmond (the United States)
- Coordinates: 37°33′07″N 76°48′39″W
- Country: United States
- State: Virginia
- County: King William
- Time zone: UTC−5 (Eastern (EST))
  - Summer (DST): UTC−4 (EDT)

Port Richmond is an unincorporated community in King William County, Virginia, United States. It lies on the Pamunkey River within the town limits of West Point, northwest of the town center and adjacent to Euclid Heights.
