= Virginia State Route 2 =

North-south state highway in Virginia, US

State Route 2

Route information
- Maintained by VDOT
- Length: 53.08 mi (85.42 km)
- Existed: July 1, 1933–present

Major junctions
- South end: US 1 / US 301 in Richmond
- I-95 in Chamberlayne; I-295 in Mechanicsville; US 301 in Bowling Green; US 17 in New Post; SR 3 in Fredericksburg
- North end: US 1 Bus. / US 17 Bus. / SR 3 Bus. in Fredericksburg

Location
- Country: United States
- State: Virginia
- Counties: City of Richmond, Henrico, Hanover, Caroline, Spotsylvania, City of Fredericksburg

Highway system
- Virginia Routes; Interstate; US; Primary; Secondary; Byways; History; HOT lanes
← US 1	→ SR 3

State Route 2 (SR 2), formerly State Route 50 (SR 50), is a primary state highway in the U.S. state of Virginia. The state highway runs 53.08 miles (85.42 km) from U.S. Route 1 (US 1) and US 301 in Richmond north to US 1 Business, US 17 Business, and SR 3 Business in Fredericksburg. SR 2 connects Richmond and Fredericksburg via Bowling Green. The state highway runs concurrently with US 301 from Richmond to Bowling Green and with US 17 Business in the Fredericksburg area.

== Route description ==
SR 2 begins at an intersection with US 1 and US 301 at the northern edge of Richmond. Southbound US 1 and US 301 head south along Chamberlayne Avenue toward downtown Richmond. Northbound US 1 heads west on Azalea Avenue then turns north onto Brook Road a few blocks to the west. SR 2 and US 301 head north on Chamberlayne Avenue, a four-lane divided highway that becomes Chamberlayne Road upon entering Henrico County. A short distance north of the city limits, the carriageways split, with the southbound lanes crossing to the west of Interstate 95 (I-95). Several ramps connect the two highways with I-95 in the forested area around Upham Brook. After I-95 veers northwest and the carriageways rejoin, SR 2 and US 301 pass through the suburb of Chamberlayne. The highways meet the eastern end of Parham Road, the main east–west boulevard of Henrico County, just before crossing the Chickahominy River into Hanover County.

SR 2 and US 301 meet I-295 at a cloverleaf interchange just north of the county line. The two highways continue through a suburban area where they pass under CSX's Piedmont Subdivision. North of Hanover High School, SR 2 and US 301 was reduced to two lanes, and the road's name was changed to Hanover Courthouse Road. The highways pass the 18th century Hanover County Courthouse and meet the eastern end of SR 54 (Patrick Henry Road) in the county seat of Hanover Courthouse. SR 2 and US 301 cross the Pamunkey River into Caroline County. The road, now named Richmond Turnpike, intersects SR 30 (Dawn Boulevard) in the hamlet of Bowersville, also known as Dawn. The two highways run straight for 13 miles (21 km); near the north end of the straight, the highways cross the Mattaponi River.

At the north end of the straight, SR 2 and US 301 expand to a four-lane divided highway that lasts until the two highways pass under SR 207 (Bowling Green Bypass). US 301 leaves SR 2 on a two-way ramp to the bypass to head toward the Potomac River Bridge into Charles County, Maryland. SR 2 and US 301 Business continue into the town of Bowling Green as Main Street. At the north end of downtown, the state highway intersects Broaddus Avenue, which heads west as SR 207 Business and east as US 301 Business. SR 2 leaves town as the Fredericksburg Turnpike. On this only stretch of the state highway that does not run concurrently with another highway, the highway passes along the western edge of Fort A.P. Hill and through the hamlets of Villboro, Locks Corner, and Corbin. SR 2 becomes Sandy Lane Drive upon entering Spotsylvania County, where its solo existence ends at its intersection with US 17 (Mills Drive) at New Post.

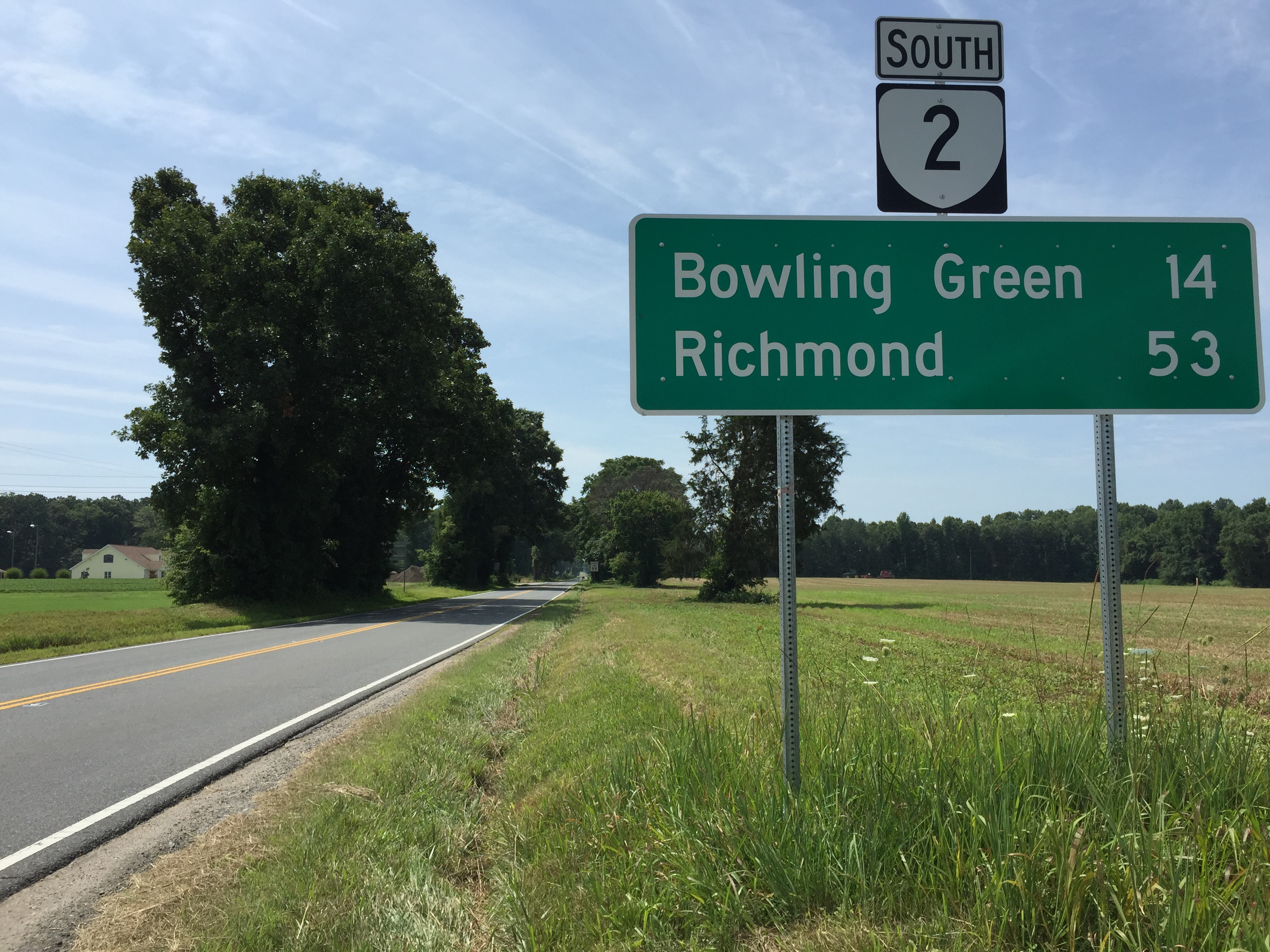
View south along SR 2 just south of US 17 near Fredericksburg

SR 2 continues north together with US 17 Business along Tidewater Trail, which crosses Massaponax Creek and passes through a suburban area on the south side of Fredericksburg. The highways become Dixon Street and expand to a four-lane divided highway as they enter the independent city. SR 2 and US 17 Business meet SR 3 (Blue and Gray Parkway) at a partial cloverleaf interchange. At Charles Street, Dixon Street veers east, then the two highways turn north onto a one-way pair, Caroline Street northbound and Princess Anne Street southbound. The two streets pass under CSX's RF&P Subdivision at the southern end of downtown adjacent to the Fredericksburg station, which serves Amtrak and Virginia Railway Express's Fredericksburg Line. Immediately north of the railroad crossing SR 2 and US 17 Business meet US 1 Business (Lafayette Boulevard), which joins the two highways through downtown Fredericksburg. Just north of St. George's Episcopal Church, which abuts Princess Anne Street, SR 2 reaches its northern terminus at SR 3 Business (William Street). The two U.S. Highway business routes continue north through Fredericksburg to an intersection with US 1 just south of that highway's crossing of the Rappahannock River.

== Major intersections ==
County	Location	mi	km	Destinations	Notes
City of Richmond		0.00	0.00	US 1 / US 301 south (Azalea Avenue / Chamberlayne Avenue)	Southern terminus; southern end of US 301 concurrency
see US 301 (mile 79.45-112.35)
Caroline	Bowling Green	32.90	52.95	US 301 north / SR 207 west (Bowling Green Bypass) to I-95 – Baltimore, Fort A.P. Hill	Interchange; north end of US 301 overlap; south end of US 301 Bus. overlap
Caroline	Bowling Green	33.86	54.49	US 301 Bus. north / SR 207 Bus. west (Broaddus Avenue) to I-95 / US 1 – Baltimore, Fort A.P. Hill	north end of US 301 Bus. overlap
Caroline	Villboro			SR 626 (Woodford Road)	former SR 208 west
Spotsylvania	New Post	47.05	75.72	US 17 (Mills Drive) to I-95 – Winchester, Newport News, Pettigrew Wildlife Management Area	Southern end of US 17 Bus. concurrency
City of Fredericksburg		52.13	83.90	SR 3 (Blue and Gray Parkway) – Culpeper, King George	Interchange
City of Fredericksburg		52.71	84.83	US 1 Bus. south (Lafayette Boulevard) to I-95	Southern end of US 1 Bus. concurrency
City of Fredericksburg		53.08	85.42	US 1 Bus. north / US 17 Bus. north (Caroline Street) / SR 3 Bus. east (William Street)	Northern terminus; northern end of US 1 Bus. / US 17 Bus. concurrencies
1.000 mi = 1.609 km; 1.000 km = 0.621 mi: Concurrency terminus

< SR 49	Two‑digit State Routes; 1923-1933	SR 51 >
