= Caroline County, Virginia =

County in Virginia, United States

- County
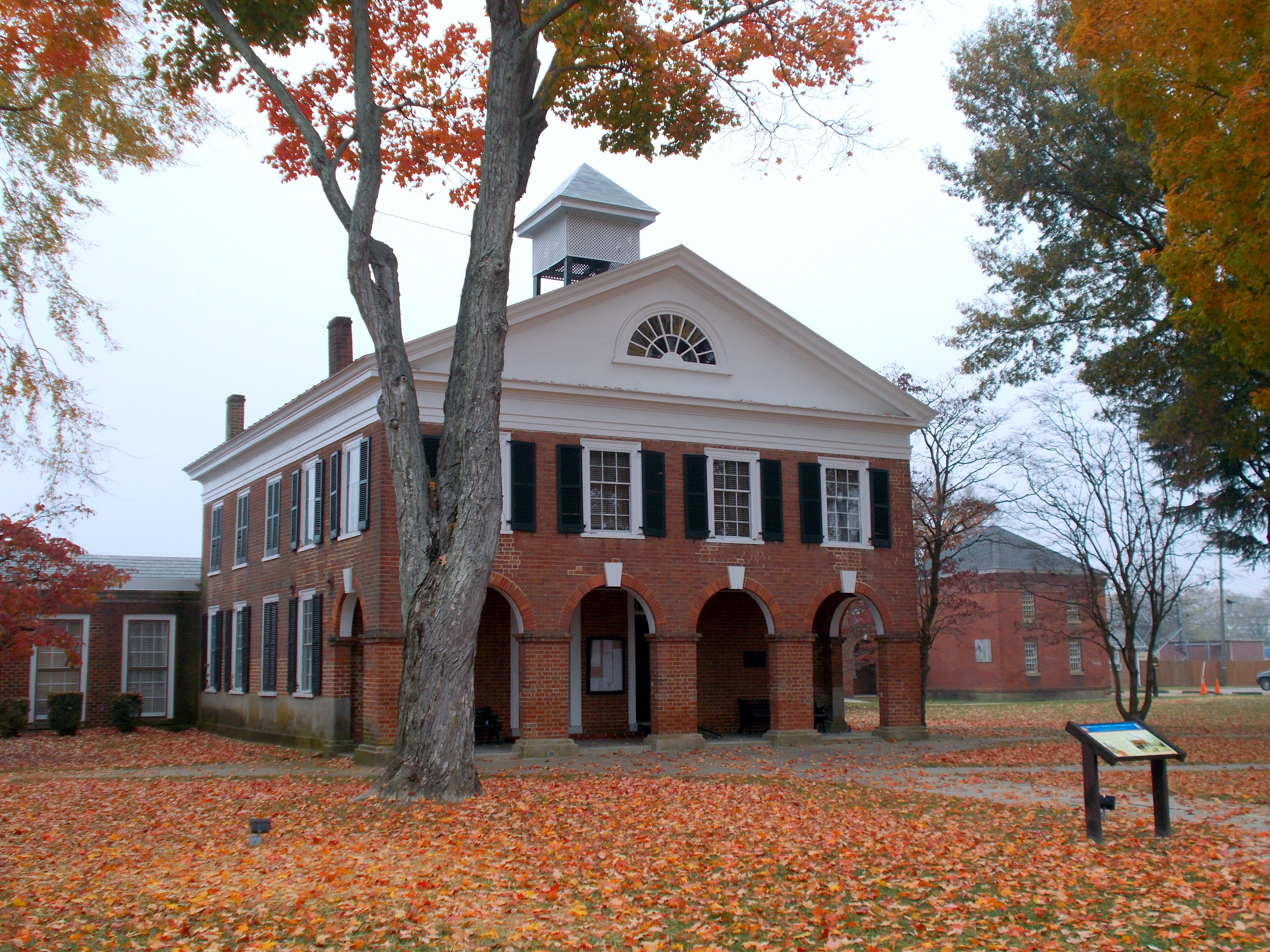
- Caroline County Courthouse (built 1803–1809) in Bowling Green

- Flag Seal

- Location within the U.S. state of Virginia
- Coordinates: 38°02′N 77°21′W
- Country: United States
- State: Virginia
- Founded: 1727
- Named for: Caroline of Ansbach
- Seat: Bowling Green
- Largest town: Bowling Green

Area
  - Total: 537 sq mi (1,390 km^{2})
  - Land: 528 sq mi (1,370 km^{2})
  - Water: 9 sq mi (23 km^{2}) 1.7%

Population (2020)
  - Total: 30,887
  - Estimate (2025): 34,413 ▲
  - Density: 58.5/sq mi (22.6/km^{2})
- Time zone: UTC−5 (Eastern)
  - Summer (DST): UTC−4 (EDT)
- Congressional district: 7th
- Website: www.co.caroline.va.us

Caroline County is a United States county located in the eastern part of the Commonwealth of Virginia. The northern boundary of the county borders on the Rappahannock River, notably at the historic town of Port Royal. The Caroline county seat is Bowling Green.

Caroline County was established in 1728 and was named in honor of the British queen Caroline of Ansbach. Developed in the colonial and antebellum years for tobacco and later mixed crops, worked by generations of enslaved African Americans, such agriculture gradually became less important. In the 20th century it was known for thoroughbred horse farms. It is the birthplace of the renowned racehorse Secretariat, winner of the 1973 Triple Crown: the Kentucky Derby, Preakness Stakes and Belmont Stakes.

As of the 2020 census, the county population was 30,887. It has doubled in the last fifty years. It is currently the location of the population center of Virginia.

== History ==
=== Founding, and colonial era ===
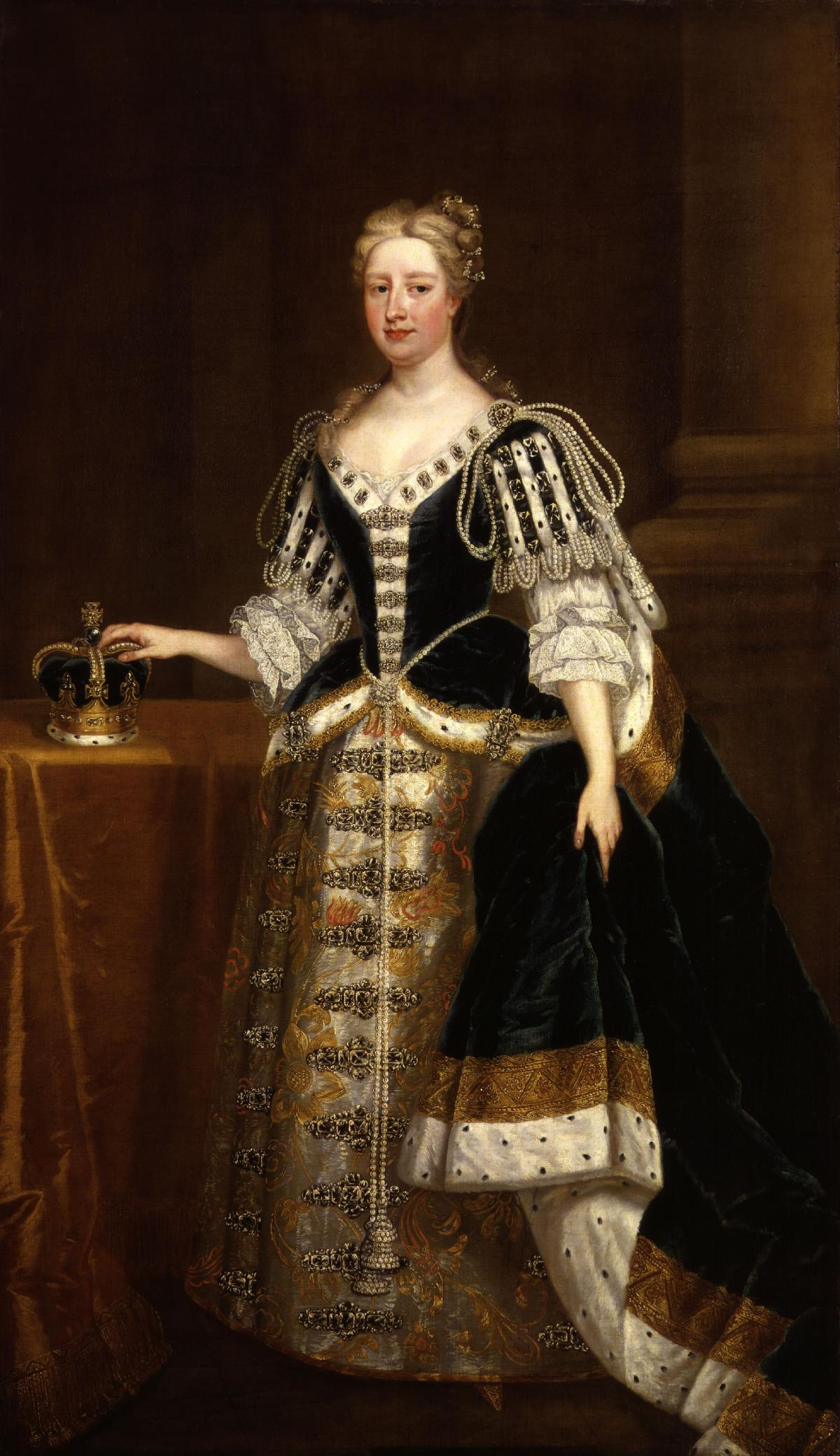
Portrait of Queen Caroline, for whom the county was named

Caroline County was established in the British Colony of Virginia in 1727 from parts of Essex, King and Queen, and King William counties. It was named for the new queen of Great Britain, Caroline of Ansbach.

During the Colonial Period, Caroline County was the birthplace of thoroughbred horse racing in North America. Arabian horses were imported from England to provide the basis for American breeding stock. The economy was based on tobacco cultivation as a commodity crop, and later mixed crops, much of which was worked by enslaved Africans and African Americans into the antebellum period.

The planter elite of Virginia became active in seeking independence from Great Britain. Patriot Edmund Pendleton played a large role in the Virginia Resolution for Independence (1775). Caroline native John Penn, who later lived in and represented North Carolina as a delegate, was a signer of the Declaration of Independence, albeit as a delegate from North Carolina.

=== 19th century ===
Explorers William Clark and his slave York were members of the Lewis and Clark Expedition (1803–1805), commissioned by President Thomas Jefferson to explore the newly acquired Louisiana Purchase area west of the Mississippi River. William's older brother, General George Rogers Clark, was considered a conqueror of the old Northwest Territory and a Revolutionary War hero. Both were born near what is now Ladysmith.

In 1847, after being a member of the first graduating class of Virginia Military Institute (VMI), William "Little Billy" Mahone (1826–1895) of Southampton County began teaching at Rappahannock Academy in Caroline County. He was to become prominent as a railroad builder and developer, Confederate general, leader of Virginia's short-lived Readjuster Party, and a United States Senator.

On May 10, 1863, Confederate Lieutenant General Thomas "Stonewall" Jackson died of complications from pneumonia at the Chandler plantation in Guinea Station (also known as Guiney's Station), in the unincorporated Caroline County community of Woodford. The Chandler residence has been preserved and is now known as the "Jackson Shrine."

During the American Civil War, Union General Ulysses S. Grant's Overland Campaign, Confederate troops under General George E. Pickett fought Union troops near Milford. Just as the Civil War was concluding in April 1865, President Lincoln was assassinated in Washington, D.C., as part of a conspiracy to kill the leaders of the United States. As the conspirators fled, a manhunt was launched. After 10 days, in the wee hours of April 26, federal troops tracked down John Wilkes Booth, Lincoln's assassin, and fellow conspirator David E. Herold at Garrett's farm about 3 miles west of Port Royal. Booth was fatally shot during their capture by federal troops. Herold was returned to Washington, where he was executed by hanging with 3 co-conspirators on July 7, 1865.

=== 20th century ===
While racial segregation was the law under Jim Crow, in many small communities, residents made friendships across racial lines. In 1958, Richard Loving and Mildred Jeter decided to marry. They went to Washington, D.C., but returned to their home in Central Point in this county. Living as a married interracial couple, they challenged state miscegenation laws. They were soon arrested and charged under the state's anti-miscegenation statute, the Racial Integrity Act of 1924. Forced to leave the state to avoid jail, they lived in Washington, D.C., for years but wanted to return home; they filed suit against the state's law. Their case reached the Supreme Court of the United States on appeal, which in 1967 found anti-miscegenation statutes to be unconstitutional in Loving v. Virginia, based on violating due process and equal rights under the law.

At the southern edge of the county, The Meadow, a plantation originally established in 1810, became a premier facility in the 20th century for breeding, raising and training Thoroughbred racehorses. In 1972, Riva Ridge, raised and trained at The Meadow, won the Kentucky Derby and the Belmont Stakes, two of the three events of the Triple Crown. In 1973 Secretariat, born at The Meadow, won the Triple Crown for the Chenery family's Meadow Stable.

=== 21st century ===
In 2003, The State Fair of Virginia purchased Meadow Farm for development as a new site for the annual Virginia State Fair. Long held at locations in the capital of Richmond and Henrico County, the fair was increasingly squeezed out by expanding development around it and the growth of the event. Before development of Meadow Farm, it was held at Strawberry Hill in central Henrico County, at the facility which later became the Richmond International Raceway.

Beginning in September 2009, the annual Virginia State Fair has been held at the new Meadow Event Park in Caroline County. The annual Meadow Celtic Games and Festival (formerly Richmond Celtic Games and Festival) will also be held at the new facility.

In 2009 the National Civic League presented Caroline County with one of ten annual All-America City Awards.

== Geography ==
According to the U.S. Census Bureau, the county has a total area of 537 square miles (1,390 km^{2}), of which 528 square miles (1,370 km^{2}) is land and 9 square miles (23 km^{2}) (1.7%) is water. Caroline County is 30 miles (48 km) north of the capital in Richmond and 32 miles (51 km) south of Fredericksburg.

Caroline County is bounded on the north by Spotsylvania and King George counties; on the south by Hanover County; on the east by King William, King and Queen, and Essex counties; and on the west by Spotsylvania County.

The county is home to a quarry that has proved a rich source of pre-historic whale and shark skeletons. The whole county is located in what was in ancient times land under an ocean. It is known to paleontologists as the middle Miocene Calvert Formation of Virginia. A whale skeleton discovered there in 1990 was proved to be a new whale species (see Eobalaenoptera harrisoni).

Caroline County is served by Interstate 95, US 1 and US 301. These three routes are important for inter-regional travel.

=== Adjacent counties ===
- King George County – north
- Hanover County – south
- King William County – east
- King and Queen County – east
- Essex County – east
- Spotsylvania County – northwest

=== Major highways ===
- I-95, the major north–south highway on the Eastern Seaboard runs through Caroline County. Exits 104 and 110 are located in the county and provide numerous motorist services. A pair of rest areas are located between the two interchanges at Milepost 108.
- US 1, a principal route connecting Richmond, Petersburg, and beyond enters Caroline County after the North Anna River Bridge. The road is known locally as Jefferson Davis Highway, and George Washington Boulevard, depending on which communities it runs through. The road is a four-lane, undivided highway with occasional left turn lanes and dividers at many intersections. It runs through Chandler Crossing, Ruther Glen, Golansville, Ladysmith, Ryland Corner, Cedon, and Ann Wrights Corner, before crossing into the Spotsylvania County Line.
- US 17, a principal route connecting the Hampton Road area with Fredericksburg as it runs through Caroline County along close proximity to the Rappahannock River. The road is known locally as Tidewater Trail. U.S. 17 is a four-lane, divided highway until it reaches Port Royal Crossroads and becomes a four-lane undivided highway. Dividers briefly return at the intersection with US 301, and then the road becomes a two-lane highway throughout the rest of the county before crossing into Spotsylvania County.
- US 301, a principal route connecting Richmond, Petersburg, and beyond enters Caroline County shortly after crossing a bridge over the Pamunkey River. The road is known locally as Richmond Turnpike for points south of the Bowling Green Bypass and as A.P. Hill Boulevard north of the bypass, and Main Street north of US 17 until it crosses the bridge over the Rappahannock River. The road is a two-lane undivided highway until reaching Antioch Forks, where it becomes a four-lane divided highway almost entirely throughout the county. U.S. 301 runs winds through Fort A.P. Hill until approaching Port Royal Crossroads at US 17, where the divider ends as it becomes Main Street until the bridge over the Rappahannock.
- SR 2, a south-to-north state route that runs concurrent with US 301 until Bowling Green. North of the Bowling Green Bypass it becomes Main Street, and north of the town limits, it becomes Fredericksburg Turnpike, until it crosses the Spotsylvania County Line.
- SR 30, a west to east state route that winds through southern Caroline County as Dawn Boulevard. It enters the county from Doswell in Hanover County and crosses the King William county line before entering Calno.
- SR 207, a major state route that runs from Ruther Glen to Bowling Green 11.93 miles (19.20 km) and connects US 1 and I-95 to US 301. The road is known for most of its length as Rogers Clark Boulevard, until it moves onto the Bowling Green Bypass.

=== National protected area ===
- Rappahannock River Valley National Wildlife Refuge (part) Port Royal unit

== Demographics ==
Historical population
Census	Pop.	Note	%±
1790	17,489		—
1800	17,438		−0.3%
1810	17,544		0.6%
1820	18,008		2.6%
1830	17,760		−1.4%
1840	17,813		0.3%
1850	18,456		3.6%
1860	18,464		0.0%
1870	15,128		−18.1%
1880	17,243		14.0%
1890	16,681		−3.3%
1900	16,709		0.2%
1910	16,596		−0.7%
1920	15,954		−3.9%
1930	15,263		−4.3%
1940	13,945		−8.6%
1950	12,471		−10.6%
1960	12,725		2.0%
1970	13,925		9.4%
1980	17,904		28.6%
1990	19,217		7.3%
2000	22,121		15.1%
2010	28,545		29.0%
2020	30,887		8.2%
2025 (est.)	34,413	▲	11.4%
U.S. Decennial Census; 1790–1960 1900–1990; 1990–2000 2010 2020

=== Racial and ethnic composition ===
Caroline County, Virginia – Racial and ethnic composition Note: the US Census treats Hispanic/Latino as an ethnic category. This table excludes Latinos from the racial categories and assigns them to a separate category. Hispanics/Latinos may be of any race.
Race / Ethnicity (NH = Non-Hispanic)	Pop 1980	Pop 1990	Pop 2000	Pop 2010	Pop 2020	% 1980	% 1990	% 2000	% 2010	% 2020
White alone (NH)	9,857	11,631	13,710	18,145	18,841	55.05%	60.52%	61.98%	63.57%	61.00%
Black or African American alone (NH)	7,644	7,230	7,562	8,297	7,627	42.69%	37.62%	34.18%	29.07%	24.69%
Native American or Alaska Native alone (NH)	191	202	168	189	160	1.07%	1.05%	0.76%	0.66%	0.52%
Asian alone (NH)	39	48	79	170	296	0.22%	0.25%	0.36%	0.60%	0.96%
Native Hawaiian or Pacific Islander alone (NH)	x	x	3	18	15	x	x	0.01%	0.06%	0.05%
Other race alone (NH)	45	6	33	49	163	0.25%	0.03%	0.15%	0.17%	0.53%
Mixed race or Multiracial (NH)	x	x	271	718	1,817	x	x	1.23%	2.52%	5.88%
Hispanic or Latino (any race)	128	100	295	959	1,968	0.71%	0.52%	1.33%	3.36%	6.37%
Total	17,904	19,217	22,121	28,545	30,887	100.00%	100.00%	100.00%	100.00%	100.00%

=== 2020 census ===
As of the 2020 census, the county had a population of 30,887. The median age was 40.3 years. 22.7% of residents were under the age of 18 and 17.2% of residents were 65 years of age or older. For every 100 females there were 97.7 males, and for every 100 females age 18 and over there were 95.0 males age 18 and over.

The racial makeup of the county was 62.2% White, 25.0% Black or African American, 0.5% American Indian and Alaska Native, 1.0% Asian, 0.0% Native Hawaiian and Pacific Islander, 3.5% from some other race, and 7.8% from two or more races. Hispanic or Latino residents of any race comprised 6.4% of the population.

0.0% of residents lived in urban areas, while 100.0% lived in rural areas.

There were 11,446 households in the county, of which 31.8% had children under the age of 18 living with them and 25.8% had a female householder with no spouse or partner present. About 23.2% of all households were made up of individuals and 10.3% had someone living alone who was 65 years of age or older.

There were 12,415 housing units, of which 7.8% were vacant. Among occupied housing units, 81.0% were owner-occupied and 19.0% were renter-occupied. The homeowner vacancy rate was 1.4% and the rental vacancy rate was 5.1%.

=== 2000 census ===
As of the census of 2000, there were 22,121 people, 8,021 households, and 6,007 families residing in the county. The population density was 42 people per square mile (16 people/km^{2}). There were 8,889 housing units at an average density of 17 units per square mile (6.6 units/km^{2}). The racial makeup of the county was 62.57% White, 34.37% Black or African American, 0.78% Native American, 0.36% Asian, 0.03% Pacific Islander, 0.52% from other races, and 1.37% from two or more races. 1.33% of the population were Hispanic or Latino of any race.

There were 8,021 households, out of which 31.70% had children under the age of 18 living with them, 56.30% were married couples living together, 13.20% had a female householder with no husband present, and 25.10% were non-families. 20.50% of all households were made up of individuals, and 8.20% had someone living alone who was 65 years of age or older. The average household size was 2.69 and the average family size was 3.08.

In the county, the population was spread out, with 24.80% under the age of 18, 7.40% from 18 to 24, 29.90% from 25 to 44, 25.00% from 45 to 64, and 12.90% who were 65 years of age or older. The median age was 38 years. For every 100 females there were 99.10 males. For every 100 females aged 18 and over, there were 97.50 males.

The median income for a household in the county was $39,845, and the median income for a family was $43,533. Males had a median income of $31,701 versus $22,455 for females. The per capita income for the county was $18,342. About 7.20% of families and 9.40% of the population were below the poverty line, including 12.00% of those under age 18 and 11.70% of those age 65 or over.

As noted, Caroline County gained the State Fair of Virginia (previously in Richmond since 1854 when the first State Fair opened in Monroe Park), which facility will be a venue for other events. New businesses and developments include Remuda Programs for Eating Disorders, The Virginia Sports Complex, the multi-national electrical contracting firm, M.C. Dean, and the Fortune 14 Company McKesson Corporation. The latter developed a 340,000 square foot distribution center, the largest private square footage investment in Virginia in 2010.

== Government ==
=== Board of Supervisors ===
- Bowling Green District: Jeffrey M. "Jeff" Sili (R)
- Madison District: Clayton T. Forehand (I)
- Mattaponi District: Floyd W. Thomas Jr. (D)
- Port Royal District: Nancy Long (R)
- Reedy Church District: Reggie L. Underwood (D)
- Western Caroline District: Jeffrey S. Black (I)

=== Administration ===
- County Administrator: Charles M. Culley Jr.
- Deputy County Administrator: Alan Partin

=== Constitutional officers ===
- Clerk of the Circuit Court: Susan Minarchi (R)
- Commissioner of the Revenue: Mark Bissoon (I)
- Commonwealth's Attorney: Benjamin Heidt (I)
- Sheriff: C.S. Moser (I)
- Treasurer: Brittany Eisenbrown (I)

Caroline County is represented by Republican Ryan T. McDougle in the Virginia Senate, Republicans Robert D. "Bobby" Orrock, Hyland F. "Buddy" Fowler, and Margaret Bevans Ransone in the Virginia House of Delegates and Democrat Eugene Vindman in the U.S. House of Representatives.

United States presidential election results for Caroline County, Virginia
Year	Republican		Democratic		Third party(ies)	
Year	No.	%	No.	%	No.	%
1912	144	16.63%	590	68.13%	132	15.24%
1916	198	23.57%	637	75.83%	5	0.60%
1920	308	31.30%	665	67.58%	11	1.12%
1924	223	20.59%	840	77.56%	20	1.85%
1928	638	49.96%	639	50.04%	0	0.00%
1932	270	19.79%	1,076	78.89%	18	1.32%
1936	258	18.87%	1,104	80.76%	5	0.37%
1940	305	21.08%	1,136	78.51%	6	0.41%
1944	383	27.53%	1,004	72.18%	4	0.29%
1948	397	30.26%	731	55.72%	184	14.02%
1952	858	47.01%	954	52.27%	13	0.71%
1956	907	46.06%	853	43.32%	209	10.61%
1960	864	36.50%	1,483	62.65%	20	0.84%
1964	1,166	35.95%	2,064	63.64%	13	0.40%
1968	1,162	26.25%	2,165	48.92%	1,099	24.83%
1972	2,086	52.80%	1,814	45.91%	51	1.29%
1976	1,648	34.36%	3,064	63.89%	84	1.75%
1980	2,071	40.18%	2,924	56.73%	159	3.08%
1984	2,949	48.04%	3,111	50.68%	78	1.27%
1988	3,065	48.71%	3,186	50.64%	41	0.65%
1992	2,947	38.01%	3,770	48.63%	1,036	13.36%
1996	2,816	38.65%	3,897	53.49%	572	7.85%
2000	3,873	46.38%	4,314	51.66%	164	1.96%
2004	4,999	50.22%	4,878	49.01%	77	0.77%
2008	5,617	43.48%	7,163	55.45%	139	1.08%
2012	6,151	45.06%	7,276	53.30%	225	1.65%
2016	7,147	48.09%	6,432	43.28%	1,284	8.64%
2020	8,336	51.18%	7,657	47.01%	295	1.81%
2024	9,511	53.74%	7,957	44.96%	230	1.30%

== Communities ==
There are two incorporated towns in Caroline County. They are:

- Bowling Green
- Port Royal

=== Bowling Green ===
The town of Bowling Green was earlier known as New Hope Village. One of the earliest stage roads in the colony ran through the area from Richmond to the Potomac River, where a ferry crossing was operated to Charles County, Maryland. One of the first stage lines in America to maintain a regular schedule operated along this road. New Hope Tavern was built along the road prior to 1700, and the area around it became known as New Hope Village.

The town was renamed for "Bowling Green", the plantation of town founder, Colonel John Hoomes. He donated considerable land when the community became the county seat in 1803. The Bowling Green estate took its name from the Hoomes family's ancestral seat in England, "Bolling Green". Such naming was a tradition in the Colony of Virginia. The Bowling Green estate was the site of one of the first tracks for horse racing in North America.

The manor home of the Hoomes family, built on plantation land patented by Major Thomas Hoomes in 1667, was constructed in 1741. A prominent town landmark, it is one of the oldest residences in original condition in Virginia. Bowling Green Farm is now on the Virginia Landmarks Register and the National Register of Historic Places.

The present Caroline County Court House was built in 1835, and Bowling Green was incorporated as a town in 1837. The town is best known as the "cradle of American horse racing".

The Richmond, Fredericksburg and Potomac Railroad (chartered in 1834) was built through nearby Milford (just west of town) and reached Fredericksburg by 1837. This important rail link between several major northern railroads at Washington, D.C., and other major southern railroads at Richmond was partially owned by the Commonwealth of Virginia for years. It was purchased by CSX Transportation in the 1990s. A major freight railroad line for north–south traffic, the corridor also carries many Amtrak trains. Although the closest Virginia Railway Express (VRE) commuter passenger rail service to Northern Virginia is accessed at Spotsylvania, future VRE extensions southward may include service at Milford. This would increase convenience for Bowling Green and the surrounding area.

Bowling Green is located along Virginia State Route 2, one of the two earlier highways between Richmond and Fredericksburg. In later years, U.S. Route 301 was built through the area, connecting Richmond with Baltimore, Maryland, by what was effectively an eastern bypass of the Washington, D.C., area. A new road, Virginia State Route 207, was established from Bowling Green west to Carmel Church. It intersects Interstate 95 and U.S. Route 1, major north–south highways.

In 1941, the United States government acquired 77,000 acres (310 km^{2}) of Caroline County to the north and east of Bowling Green. It established the A.P. Hill Military Reservation. Known in modern times as Fort A.P. Hill, the facility was named for Virginia military hero of the United States Army and later Confederate General Ambrose Powell Hill. Thousands of regular military and reserve troops undergo training at the complex each year. It was also the site of national Jamboree gatherings of the Boy Scouts of America for 29 years between 1981 and 2010.

=== Port Royal ===
Port Royal is one of the area's more historic towns. It was first established in 1652 as a port on a navigable portion of the Rappahannock River during an era when waterways were the major method of transportation of people and property in the British Colony of Virginia. It was an important point for export of tobacco, Virginia's cash crop.

Local tradition holds that Port Royal was named after the Roy family. Dorothy Roy and her husband John owned a warehouse chartered by the crown, a ferry service across the Rappahannock River to King George County and a tavern. In the 21st century, the chimneys of the Roy house are preserved landmarks in the town.

Port Royal was incorporated as a town in 1744. The "town green", upon which stands today the Town Hall and the firehouse, was forever reserved "for public and civic use".

Shipping of property from the port began to decline after completion of railroads which began in Virginia in the 1830s. The last scheduled passenger ship service ended in 1932, supplanted by highways. However, Port Royal was served by the new highways which became U.S. Route 17 and U.S. Route 301, with their crossroads at Port Royal.

=== Census-designated places ===
There are two unincorporated census-designated places in Caroline County:

- Lake Caroline
- Lake Land'Or

== Education ==
Caroline County Public Schools provides public education in the county. For the 2020–2021 school year, Caroline County Public Schools had 490 total employees with 209 of them being teachers.

== Notable people ==
- George Armistead, commander of Fort McHenry during the Battle of Baltimore
- John Wilkes Booth, well-known American actor and assassin of U.S. President Abraham Lincoln.
- Reuben Chapman, the thirteenth Governor of Alabama (1847–1849).
- Christopher Chenery, one of the founders of the New York Racing Association, and the owner/breeder of Thoroughbred horse racing's U.S. Triple Crown champion Secretariat.
- William Clark and his slave, York, and other members of the Lewis and Clark Expedition, were born in Caroline County. Clark's family, taking their slaves, moved to Louisville, Kentucky, when William was 15.
- General George Rogers Clark (1752–1818), Revolutionary war hero, conqueror of the old Northwest Territory (modern day Midwest of the US), hero of the Battle of Fort Sackville (Vincennes, Indiana) February 1779, father and founder of the Midwest. George was basically already living in Kentucky in 1784 when the Clark family left Virginia and settled there. General Clark made his home in Southern Indiana on the Ohio River, at what is known as Clark's Point.
- Peter Durrett (c. 1733–1823), founder with his wife of the First African Baptist Church of Lexington, Kentucky, the oldest black Baptist church in the state and the third oldest in the US.
- George Fitzhugh, lawyer and pro-slavery sociologist.
- Mildred and Richard Loving, successful plaintiffs in Loving v. Virginia, the U.S. Supreme Court decision ruling which determined miscegenation laws were unconstitutional and legalized interracial marriage in the United States. Subject of the 2016 Netflix movie "Loving".
- Lex Luger, record producer, owns a home in Milford, Virginia.
- Mi$tro, rapper.
- Edmund Pendleton (September 9, 1721 – October 23, 1803) was a Virginia politician, lawyer and judge, active in the American Revolutionary War.
- John Taylor of Caroline (December 19, 1753 – August 21, 1824) was a politician and writer. He served in the Virginia House of Delegates (1779–1781, 1783–1785, 1796–1800) and in the United States Senate (1792–1794, 1803, 1822–1824). He was the author of several books on politics and agriculture.
- William Lee Taylor (1854–1915) African American minister, bank president, farmer, and president of the True Reformers; formerly enslaved and born in Caroline County
- Thomas P. Westendorf (1848–1923), a notable composer.
- William Woodford, officer in the French and Indian War and American Revolutionary War.

== See also ==
- Caroline County Sheriff's Office
- National Register of Historic Places listings in Caroline County, Virginia
- Caroline County Public Schools (Virginia)
