= Caroline Hallowell Miller =

American suffragist (1831–1905)

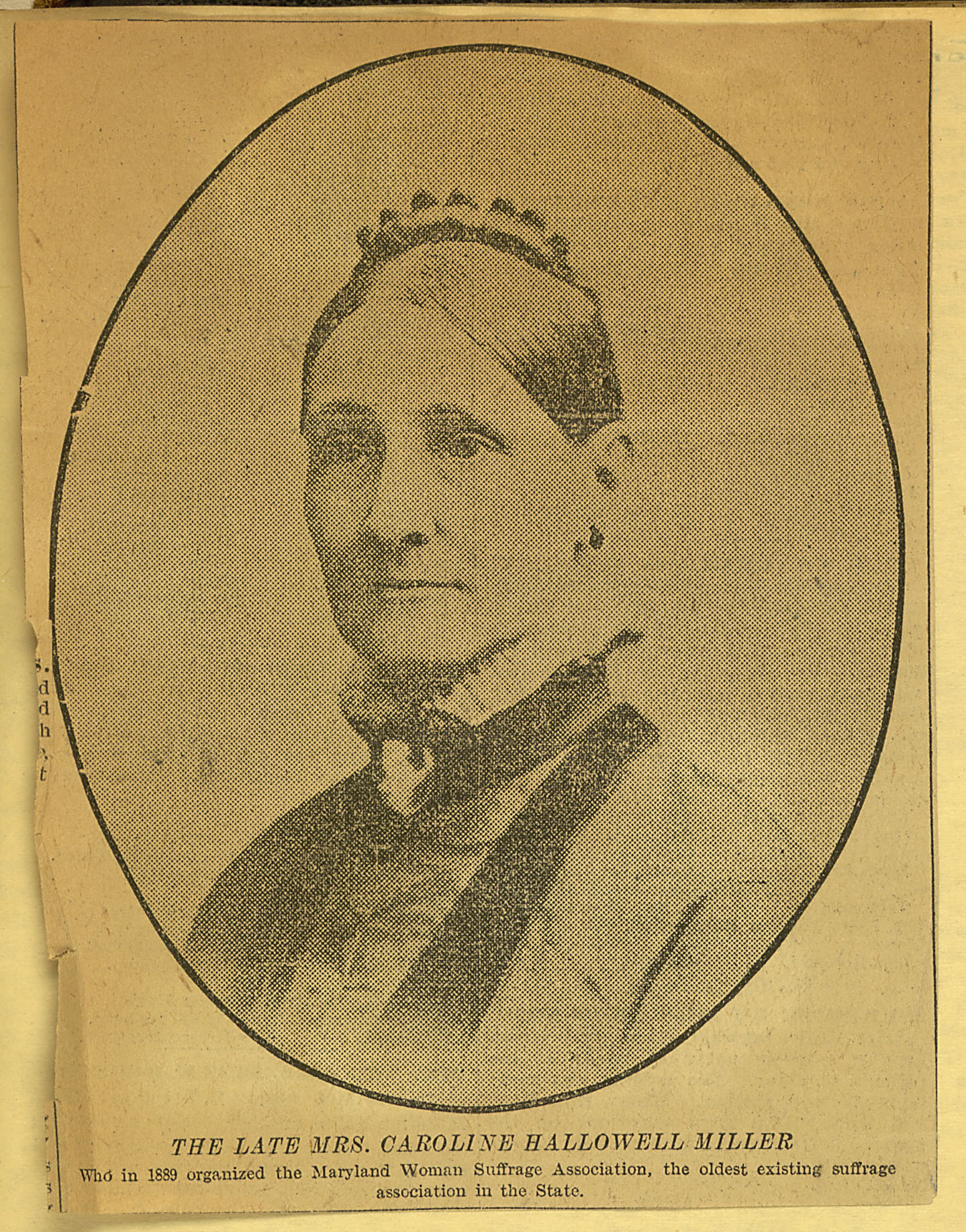
- Caroline Hallowell Miller, from a scrapbook in the Library of Congress
- Born: August 20, 1831; Alexandria, District of Columbia
- Died: September 2, 1905 (aged 74); Sandy Spring, Maryland, U.S.
- Occupations: Educator; suffragist
- Parent: Benjamin Hallowell
- Relatives: William Henry Farquhar (uncle); Arthur Briggs Farquhar (cousin); Issac Hallowell Clothier (cousin)

Caroline Hallowell Miller (August 20, 1831 – September 2, 1905) was an American educator and suffragist. She organized the Maryland Woman Suffrage Association in 1889, and was its first president.

== Early life ==
Caroline Hallowell was born in Alexandria, then part of the District of Columbia, the daughter of Benjamin Hallowell and Margaret Farquhar Hallowell. Her parents were Quaker educators active in the abolition movement; her father was the president of Maryland Agricultural College, and her mother ran a school for girls in the family's Alexandria home. Her uncle was educator William Henry Farquhar, and businessman Arthur Briggs Farquhar was one of her first cousins.

== Career ==
Miller founded the Stanmore School for Girls in Sandy Spring, Maryland in 1867. She was active in the suffrage movement and spoke at national suffrage meetings. In 1883, she was introduced by Susan B. Anthony at the National Woman Suffrage Convention in Washington. In 1889, she organized the Maryland Woman Suffrage Association, and was its first president. In 1890 she was succeeded as president by Mary Bentley Thomas. A historical marker naming both women was erected in 2021 in Sandy Spring.

== Personal life ==
Caroline Hallowell married attorney and fellow educator Francis Miller in 1852. They had seven children together; three of their children died in infancy. She was widowed when Francis Miller died in 1888; she died on September 2, 1905. Her cousin, Issac Hallowell Clothier (1837-1921), father to Hannah Hallowell Clothier Hull and William Clothier (tennis), was a cofounder of Strawbridge's and owner of "Ballytore", a mansion designed by Addison Hutton in 1885. "Her strongest characteristic was a love of justice," recalled one death notice, "and this was what made her a champion for women's enfranchisement, and for all who were oppressed in any way".
