= Arthur Briggs Farquhar =

American businessman, multi-millionaire and writer

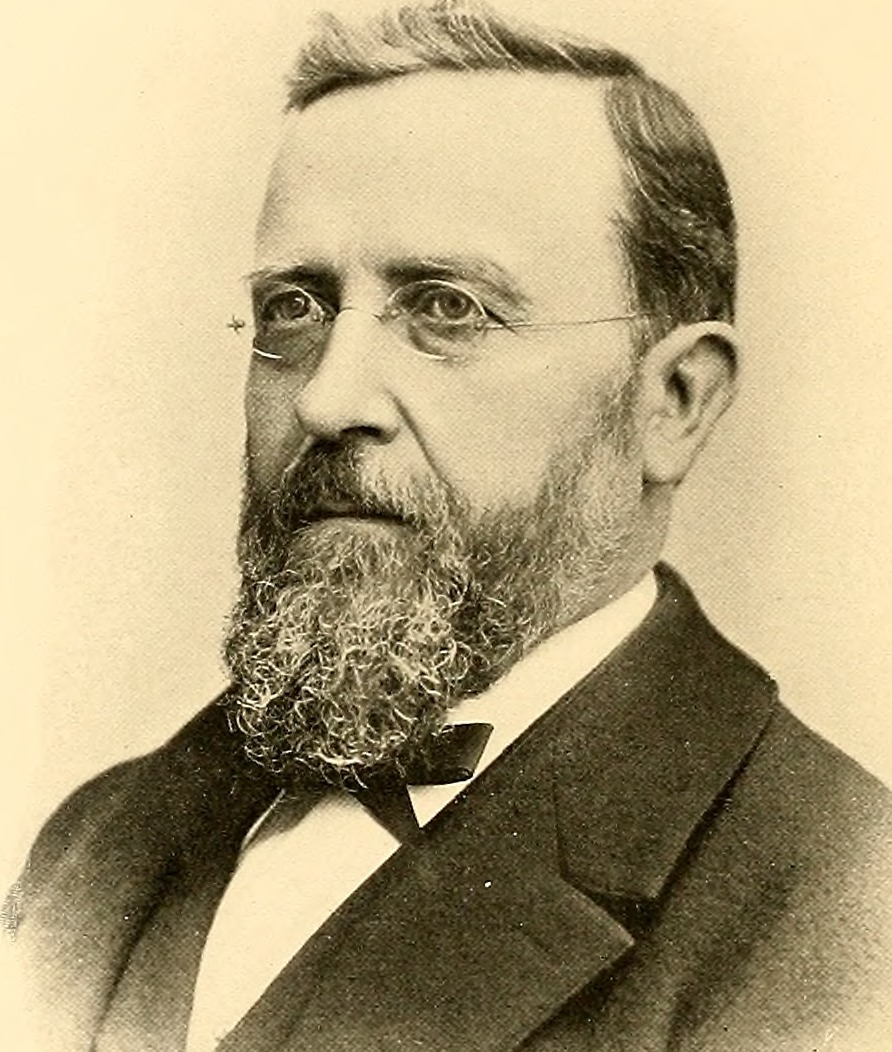
- Farquhar in 1897
- Born: September 28, 1838; Sandy Spring, Maryland, U.S.
- Died: March 5, 1925 (aged 86); York, Pennsylvania, U.S.
- Resting place: Prospect Hill Cemetery; York, Pennsylvania, U.S.
- Other name: A.B. Farquhar
- Occupations: Businessman; writer
- Known for: A.B. Farquhar Company
- Spouse: Elizabeth Jessop (m. 1860)
- Children: 5, including Percival
- Father: William Henry Farquhar
- Relatives: Isaac Briggs (uncle); Benjamin Hallowell (uncle)

Signature
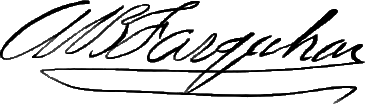

Arthur Briggs Farquhar (September 28, 1838 – March 5, 1925) was an American businessman, multi-millionaire and writer. He was the founder of A.B. Farquhar Company in York, Pennsylvania.

== Early life ==
Arthur Briggs Farquhar was born at The Cedars in Sandy Spring, Maryland, on September 28, 1838, to Margaret (née Briggs) and William Henry Farquhar. He attended school at the Sandy Spring Friends Meetinghouse and later the Hallowell Boarding School in Alexandria, Virginia, founded by his uncle Benjamin Hallowell. From an early age, he had an interest in the manufacture of agricultural machinery.

He was the nephew of Isaac Briggs.

== Career ==
=== A.B. Farquhar Company ===
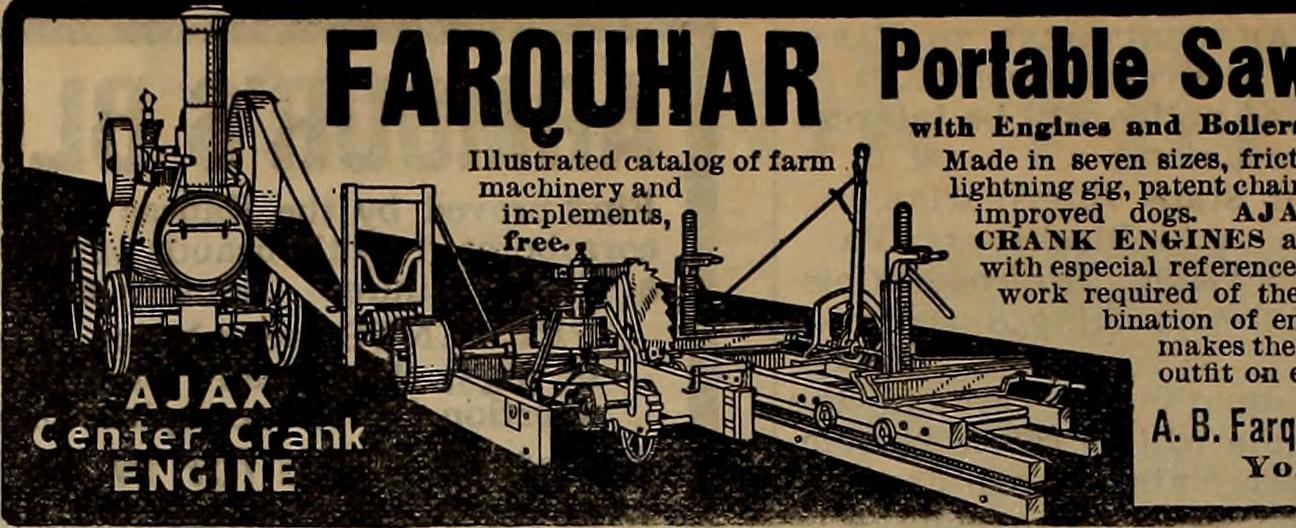
A. B. Farquhar advertisement for its Ajax steam engine

On April 4, 1856, he moved to York to live with the family of Edward Jessop, a friend of his father and future father-in-law. Three days after arriving, he became an apprentice at W.W. Dingee & Co. In 1858, he became a partner of the firm. In 1861, the W.W. Dingee & Co. factory burned down and Farquhar took over the liabilities and assets in 1862, and the company became known as the Pennsylvania Agricultural Works. To keep the business going during the American Civil War, Farquhar secured a contract with the government to supply chairs and stretchers to hospitals. In 1876, the factory caught fire again and the factory was rebuilt and expanded to a 500,000 square feet facility.

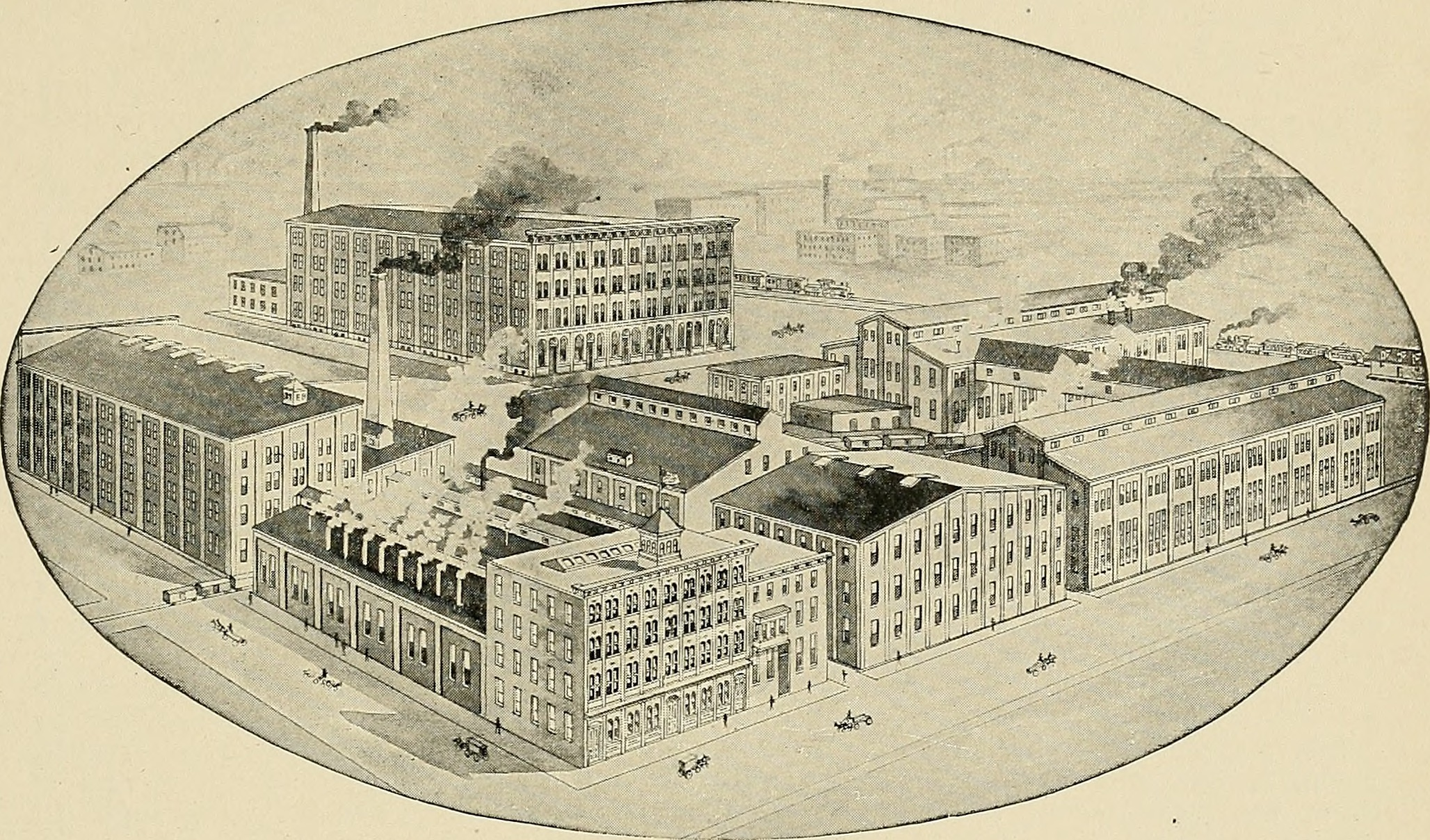
A. B. Farquhar Co. (North Duke Street, York, PA)

In 1889, the company was renamed as the A.B. Farquhar Company and he became president. The company was known worldwide for its agricultural machinery, including its Farquhar Ajax steam traction engines, vertical baler, corn and cotton planters and threshing machines. The company's machinery was showcased at a number of expositions, including the Centennial Exposition, World Cotton Centennial, World's Columbian Exposition, Pan-American Exposition, and the Louisiana Purchase Exposition. In the late 19th century, A.B. Farquhar Company employed the most people in York County, Pennsylvania. In 1911, he passed his business over to his son Francis.

Initially a pacifist, Farquhar did not want to profit off of European war contracts. In 1916, he served as a member of the American Manufacturers Export Association's American Industrial Commission to France and was appointed to the Pennsylvania Defense Organization in 1917. The company supplied hydraulic powder presses, boilers, sterilizers, shot trucks and machine tools during World War I. In 1952, the company was sold to Oliver Farm Equipment Company.

He was also the owner of the York Gazette and the president of York Hospital. He was state commissioner from Pennsylvania and Commissioner of Europe for the World's Columbian Exposition in 1893. He was also elected as president of the National Association of Executive Commissioners. He was a delegate to the first National Conservation Congress and served as director of the National Conservation Association. He was also vice president and director of the United States Chamber of Commerce. In 1911, he was elected to the York Chamber of Commerce and held the position of president until 1914.

== Civil War ==
Twice during the Battle of Gettysburg, Farquhar rode into Confederate lines to negotiate with Brigadier General John Brown Gordon about the Confederate occupation of York. After Gettysburg, he volunteered in the field hospitals and helped the wounded. Farquhar wrote a piece for McClure's about his experience, including meeting Abraham Lincoln and Edwin Stanton in Washington, D.C., after the battle.

== Publications ==
Farquhar wrote two books:

- Farquhar, Arthur B.; Farquhar, Henry (1891). Economic and Industrial Delusions; A Discussion for the Case of Protection. Doubleday, Page & Company.
- Farquhar, Arthur B.; Samuel Crowther (1922). The First Million the Hardest; An Autobiography. G. P. Putnam's sons.

== Personal life ==
On September 26, 1860, he married Elizabeth Jessop of Baltimore, daughter of Edward Jessop. Together, they had five children:

- Benjamin Hallowell Farquhar, named after educator Benjamin Hallowell
- Francis Farquhar, graduate of Yale University and Columbia Law School, president of A.B. Farquhar Company from 1925 to 1944, president of York Hospital and York National Bank
- Percival Farquhar, railroad man in Cuba, Brazil, and Guatemala
- William E. Farquhar, worked as secretary-treasurer of A.B. Farquhar Company

He was an Episcopalian. He was friends with Andrew Carnegie and William A. Clark.

== Later life and death ==
In 1875, Farquhar built the Edgecombe estate in York. In 1911, Farquhar purchased the Sharon estate in Olney, Maryland, the home of his grandfather. He restored the old log house on the property and built a mansion nearby.

Farquhar died on March 5, 1925, at Edgecombe. He had been hit by an automobile years earlier. He was buried at Prospect Hill Cemetery in York.

== Awards and legacy ==
- In the 1880s, he created the Farquhar Park and a pavilion in York.
- On August 21, 1897, Farquhar donated land to the city of York in the northwestern part of the city.
- In 1902, he received an honorary degree from Kenyon College.
- In 1999, York County Chamber of Commerce awarded the Keystone Award to Farquhar posthumously.
