= Mary Bentley Thomas =

American suffragist (1845–1923)

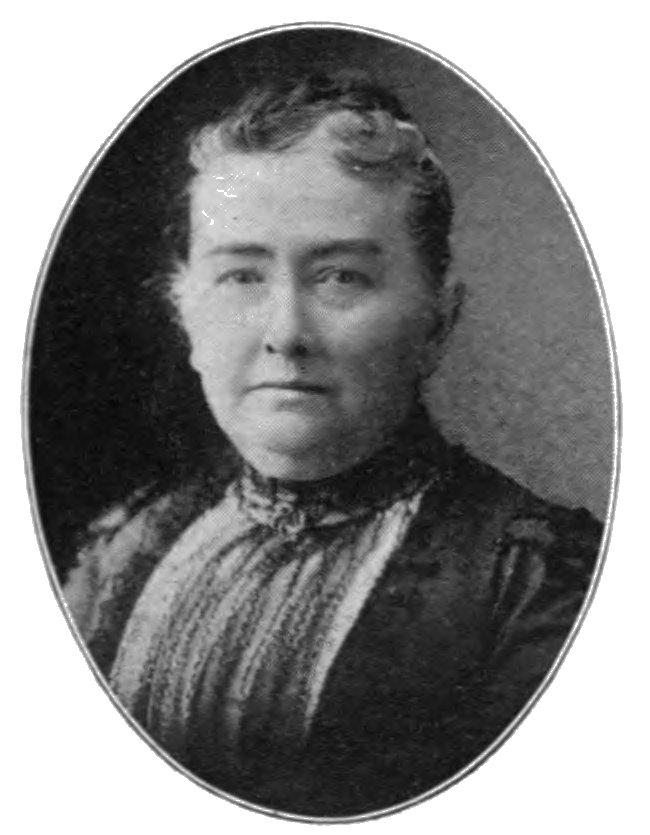
- History of Woman Suffrage Volume 4
- Born: Mary Henrietta Bentley; December 13, 1845; Maryland
- Died: February 11, 1923 (aged 77); Maryland
- Occupation: Suffragist
- Relatives: Caleb Bentley (grandfather)

Mary Bentley Thomas (December 13, 1845 – February 11, 1923) was an American suffragist and Maryland Woman Suffrage Association president from 1894 to 1904. She was also involved in the Friends Equal Rights Association and the National American Woman Suffrage Association, holding various offices in both organizations.

== Early life ==
Mary Bentley was born in Maryland to Richard and Edith Bentley, who were Quakers. Her grandfather, Caleb Bentley, was a silversmith and postmaster.

== Career ==
Thomas was president of the Maryland Woman Suffrage Association from 1894 to 1904, succeeding the association's founder, Caroline Hallowell Miller. She was in turn succeeded by Emma Maddox Funck. She held offices with the National American Woman Suffrage Association (NAWSA), and spoke at national suffrage conferences. She wrote to the governors of Wyoming, Utah, Idaho, and Colorado, and asked questions about women's suffrage, which was legal in all four states; she published the responses as a broadside. Thomas was also the third president of the Friends Equal Rights Association, and spoke on women's rights at national Quaker gatherings.

== Personal life ==
Mary Bentley married dairyman Edward Porter Thomas in 1865. They had six children together. She died in 1923, aged 77 years. Her scrapbook of newspaper clippings, in the collection of the Sandy Spring Museum, is available online at Digital Maryland. In 2021, a historical marker was erected in Sandy Spring, Maryland, noting Thomas and Miller's work on woman's suffrage; several of Thomas's descendants attended the marker's unveiling.
