= Stanley Jennings =

American journalist

Stanley Jennings (1921-2005) was a cartoonist, photographer, graphic designer, and journalist.

== Personal ==
Jennings was born in Forest Glen, Maryland and was raised on Jenkings Hill in Washington.

== Education ==
Jennings attended Eastern High School and obtained his degree from George Washington University and Corcoran College of Art and Design.

== Career ==
His first jobs were as a paperboy delivering papers for the Washington Star and also working on his family's farm in Richmond, Indiana. He worked for 15 years for National Geographic magazine, from 1956 to 1971. He was a contributor to many Washington publications, including The Washington Post, the Washington Daily News, the Washington Times-Herald, U.S. News & World Report, and Parade magazine. He designed the current version of the National Press Club seal. After working for National Geographic magazine, Jennings ran his own graphic design business, Jennings Publications.

== Organizations ==
Jennings was a member of the Senate Press Photographers Gallery. He also served on the board of directors for the National Press Club.

== Family ==
Jennings was married to Mildred Locke Jennings, but that later ended in a divorce. He remarried to Jane Smith Stokes for 21 years. He had two daughters, a stepson, two grandsons, and a great-grandson.

== Death ==
Jennings died on September 4, 2005, from congestive heart failure. He died at Montgomery General Hospital at the age of 84.
