= Jacob Wheeler Bird =

American medical doctor (1885–1959)

- Born: October 3, 1885; West River, Maryland, U.S.
- Died: October 28, 1959 (aged 74); New Hope, Alabama, U.S.
- Burial place: St. John's Episcopal Church, Olney, Maryland
- Education: St. John's College, University of Maryland School of Medicine
- Occupation: Medical doctor
- Years active: 1909–1959
- Known for: Founder of Montgomery General Hospital

Jacob Wheeler Bird (1885–1959) was a medical doctor in Sandy Spring, Maryland.

== Early years ==
Bird was born in West River, Maryland, in 1885. He attended St. John's College in Annapolis, and he earned his medical degree from the University of Maryland School of Medicine in 1907.

== Career ==
Bird worked three years as a resident and assistant superintendent of the University of Maryland Hospital in Baltimore. In 1911, Bird moved to Sandy Spring, Maryland, to take over the medical practice of Roger Brooke, whose death had left the area without a physician. Brooke's widow had specifically sought to sell the house to another doctor who would take over her late husband's medical practice. Bird named the house Glen Mary after his wife, Mary. Now located at 17420 Doctor Bird Road, (Note: 39.1419336°N 77.0418589°W) Bird lived and worked out of the transitional Colonial Revival house.

Bird made house calls to his patients, at first in a horse-drawn buggy and later an automobile. He founded a volunteer nurse corps in 1918. He founded Montgomery General Hospital, which opened November 27, 1919, as the first hospital located in Montgomery County; it is now called MedStar Montgomery Medical Center. Bird served on the Maryland State Board of Health. Bird also founded the Montgomery County Social Service League, the Juvenile Court, and the Maryland State Welfare Department.

In 1959, over 1,000 friends and neighbors of Bird attended an event honoring his fifty-year career in medicine at Montgomery General Hospital. Governor J. Millard Tawes attended.

== Personal life ==
Bird married Mary McIntyre Wilson, a nurse, in 1910. They had three children. Mary died of pleuropneumonia at their home in 1917. He later married Jean Skinner, and they had two children.

== Death ==
Bird and his wife Jean died in an automobile accident near New Hope, Alabama, on October 25, 1959. They had been visiting their son and his wife, who were injured in the crash, in nearby Huntsville. About 1,200 people attended his funeral at St. John's Episcopal Church in Olney, where he had been a vestryman. Bird and his wife were buried in the church's cemetery. The Maryland House of Delegates adopted a resolution expressing sympathy over his death.
