= William Henry Farquhar =

American historian (1813–1887)

- Born: June 14, 1813; York, Pennsylvania, U.S.
- Died: February 17, 1887 (aged 73); Sandy Spring, Maryland, U.S.
- Occupations: Educator; historian; surveyor; engineer
- Spouse: Margaret Briggs (m. 1844)
- Children: 7, including Arthur Briggs Farquhar
- Relatives: Isaac Briggs (father-in-law)

William Henry Farquhar (June 14, 1813 – February 17, 1887) was an American who was influential in the development of Montgomery County, Maryland.

== Early life and education ==
William Henry Farquhar was born in June 1813 to Amos Farquhar (1768–1835) and Mary Elgar in York, Pennsylvania. The Farquhar family was of Scottish descent. Amos was a cotton manufacturer and later became a farmer. William had a brother-in-law and sister, Benjamin Hallowell and Mary W. Kirk (née Farquahar), respectively.

The family moved from York to Montgomery County, Maryland when he was eleven and settled in the town of Olney, Maryland. He attended the Fair Hill Boarding School. Farquhar, fond of books and a student from his earliest years, completed his education with Hallowell in Alexandria, Virginia, at the Brimstone Academy. He could not fulfill his dream of studying law because of his weak eyesight. Farquhar then turned to farming and teaching.

== Personal life ==
In 1838, Farquhar built The Cedars, a home for the Farquhar family. The house was known for the notable Christmas parties.

Farquhar married Margaret Briggs (1812–1889), daughter of Isaac Briggs, in 1844, and together they had seven children:

- Allan Farquhar (1853–1944), farmer and banker
- Arthur Briggs Farquhar (1838–1925), founder of A.B. Farquhar Co. and father of Percival Farquhar
- Edward Farquhar (1843–1905), professor of English at Columbia University and librarian at the United States Patent Office
- Ellen Farquhar (d. 1927), school teacher
- Hallowell Farquhar
- Henry Farquhar, died of scarlet fever at the age of four.
- Henry Hill Farquhar (1846–1925), worked at the United States Coast Survey, United States Census Bureau, and United States Department of Agriculture. He was a delegate at the Hague Convention of 1907

== Career ==
Farquhar is most known for his contributions to the development of modern Montgomery County, Maryland. Along with Mary W. Kirk, he re-established the Fair Hill Boarding School in 1846. William also served as the principal from 1847 to 1855. He was a school commissioner for the Montgomery County School Board from 1859 to 1860 and served as its first president from 1860 to 1868. He was also a county surveyor, civil engineer, president of the Sandy Spring Lyceum from 1872 to 1873, and one of the original directors of the Mutual Fire Insurance Company from 1848 to 1885.

Other jobs include a promoter of the turnpike from Ashton, Maryland, to Olney, Maryland, a candidate for the Maryland State Senate in 1858, an influential member of the grange, director of the Sandy Spring Savings Institution from circa 1856 to 1857, a census taker on at least two occasions (1850 and 1870) and a historian. He authored The Annals of Sandy Spring in 1882.

== Later life and death ==
After about 1880, the aging Farquhar retired from most of his positions. For the rest of his life, he lived on his farm with his grandchildren and wife, where he published several books and remained influential with the Montgomery County School Board.

Farquhar died at his home in Sandy Spring on February 17, 1887.

== Legacy ==
In 1968, Montgomery County Public Schools (MCPS) named their first middle school in the county William H. Farquhar Middle School after him. The school is on Batchellor's Forest Road.
