= Mary Bentley =

Mary Bentley may refer to:

- Mary Bentley (politician) (born 1961), American politician and businesswoman in Arkansas
- Mary Bentley Thomas (1845–1923), American suffragist
- Mary Moore-Bentley (1865–1953), Australian writer and parliamentary candidate
