= Washington Christian Academy =

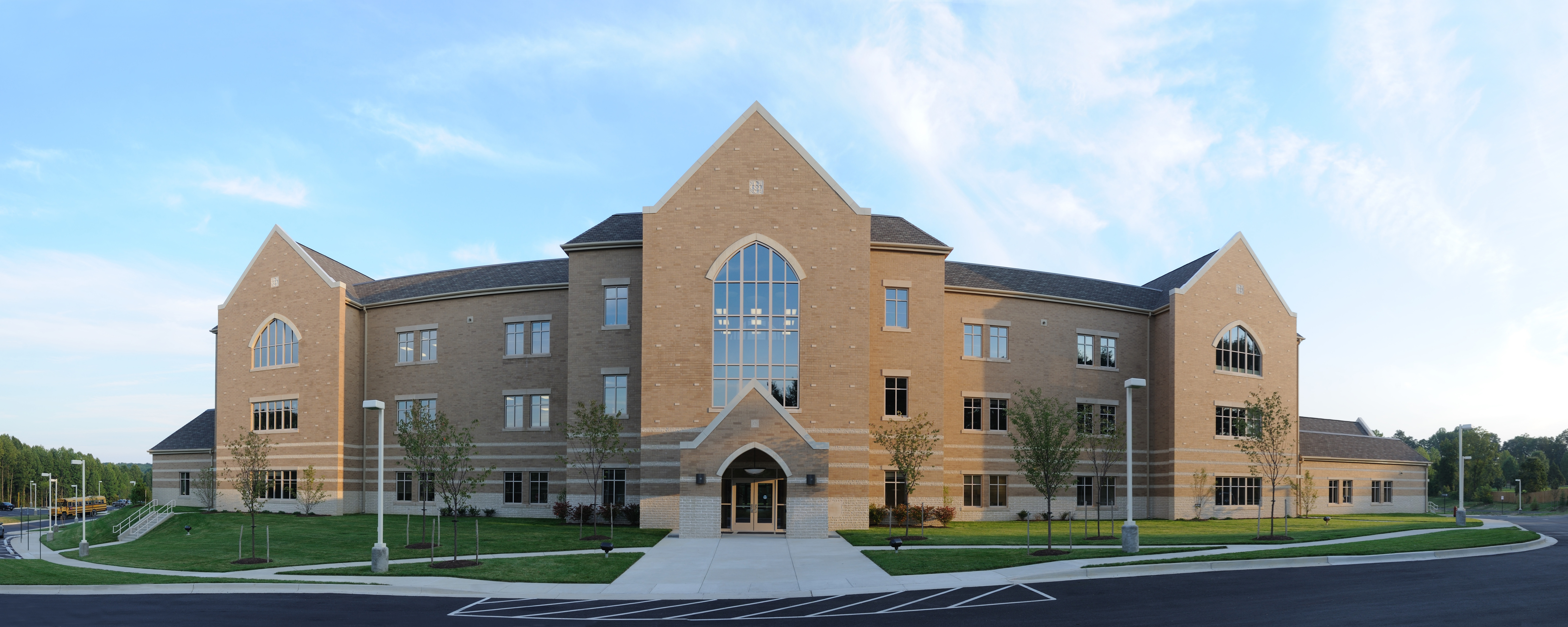

Location
- 16227 Batchellors Forest Road; Olney, Montgomery County, Maryland 20832; United States; 39°07′16″N 77°04′09″W

Information
- Other name: WCA
- Former name: Washington Christian School
- Type: Private
- Motto: Reverent, Adventurous, Academically Serious: in the Historic Reformed Tradition
- Religious affiliation: Christian
- Established: 1960; 66 years ago
- CEEB code: 210963
- NCES School ID: 00580078
- Head of school: Bart Den Boer (Interim Head of School starting Fall 2025)
- Grades: K-12
- Campus: Suburban
- Campus size: 57.63 acres (23.32 hectares)
- Colors: White and Blue
- Nickname: Wildcats
- Website: WashingtonChristian.org

Washington Christian Academy (WCA) is a private Christian school established in 1960 in Silver Spring, Maryland that is now located in Olney, Maryland, at a new campus that was completed in 2008.

== History ==
=== Formation ===
Washington Christian Academy was formed when local families from Presbyterian and Christian Reformed churches in the area felt the need for a strong, biblically based and diverse school in the Washington metropolitan area. For the time, the school defied cultural values and created a school that specifically named diversity as one of its top qualities. The school was formed as Washington Christian School in 1960 for grades K-4. WCS grew gradually, and in 1982 it leased a larger building from the county on Franwall Avenue in Silver Spring, which allowed it to add a middle school and offer instruction through the eighth grade. WCS expanded again in 1996 when it merged with the nearby Silver Spring Christian Academy (a local high school formed by parents of WCS alumni), forming Washington Christian Academy (Pre K-12).

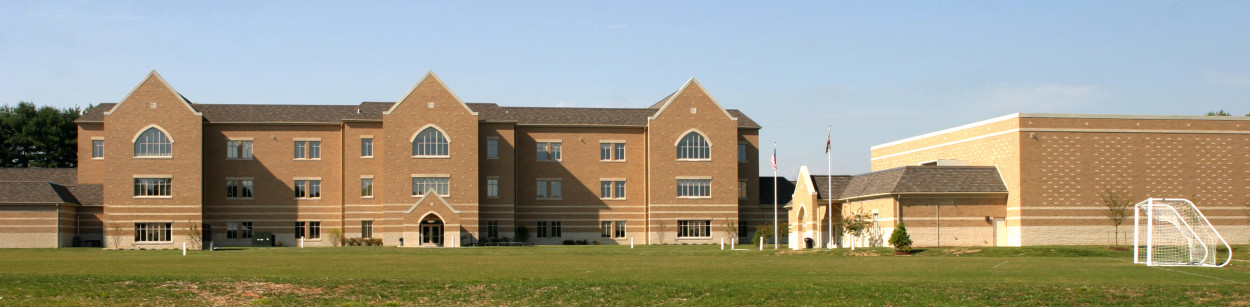

=== Transition ===
During the 2004–2005 school year, Washington Christian Academy was notified that it would need to leave the rented facility the following year as the building was to be torn down to construct a new public school. For the three years from the fall of 2005 through the spring of 2008, Washington Christian Academy rented space for its elementary school in Colesville Baptist Church off of New Hampshire Avenue in Silver Spring, and likewise rented space for the middle and high schools in Global Mission Church on Georgia Avenue in nearby Aspen Hill. During this transition period, Washington Christian Academy was able to purchase land and build a new facility, which opened in the summer of 2008.

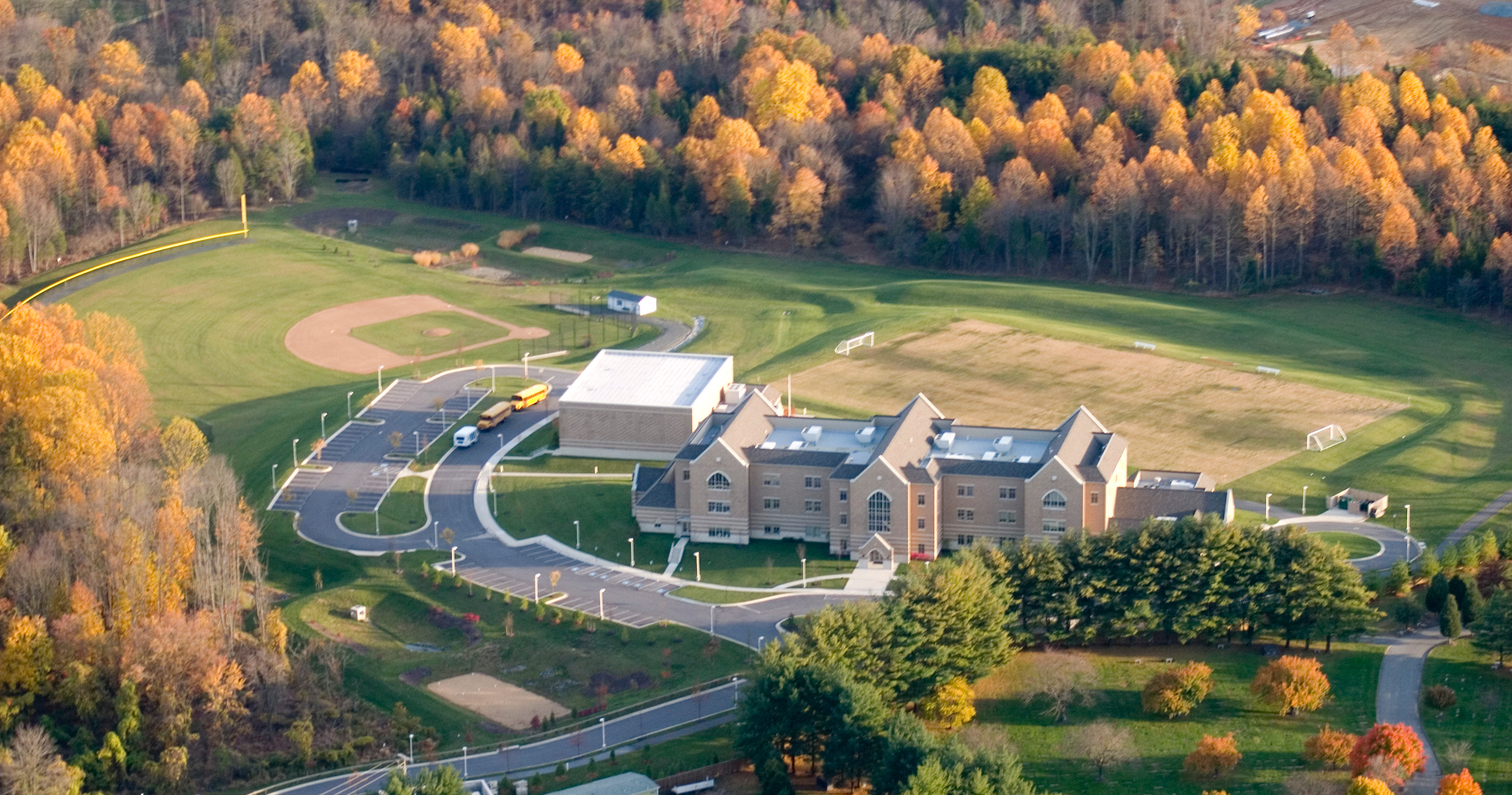
WCA's building and grounds, 2009

=== New Campus ===
Washington Christian Academy opened its newly constructed facility in Olney for the fall semester of 2008. The new building provided the school with an increase in available space and opportunity for future expansion. The new WCA property is 57.63 acres (23.32 hectares) in size, with about 22 acres (8.9 ha) of land currently developed, including the new building, gym, baseball and soccer fields and parking areas.

== Athletics ==
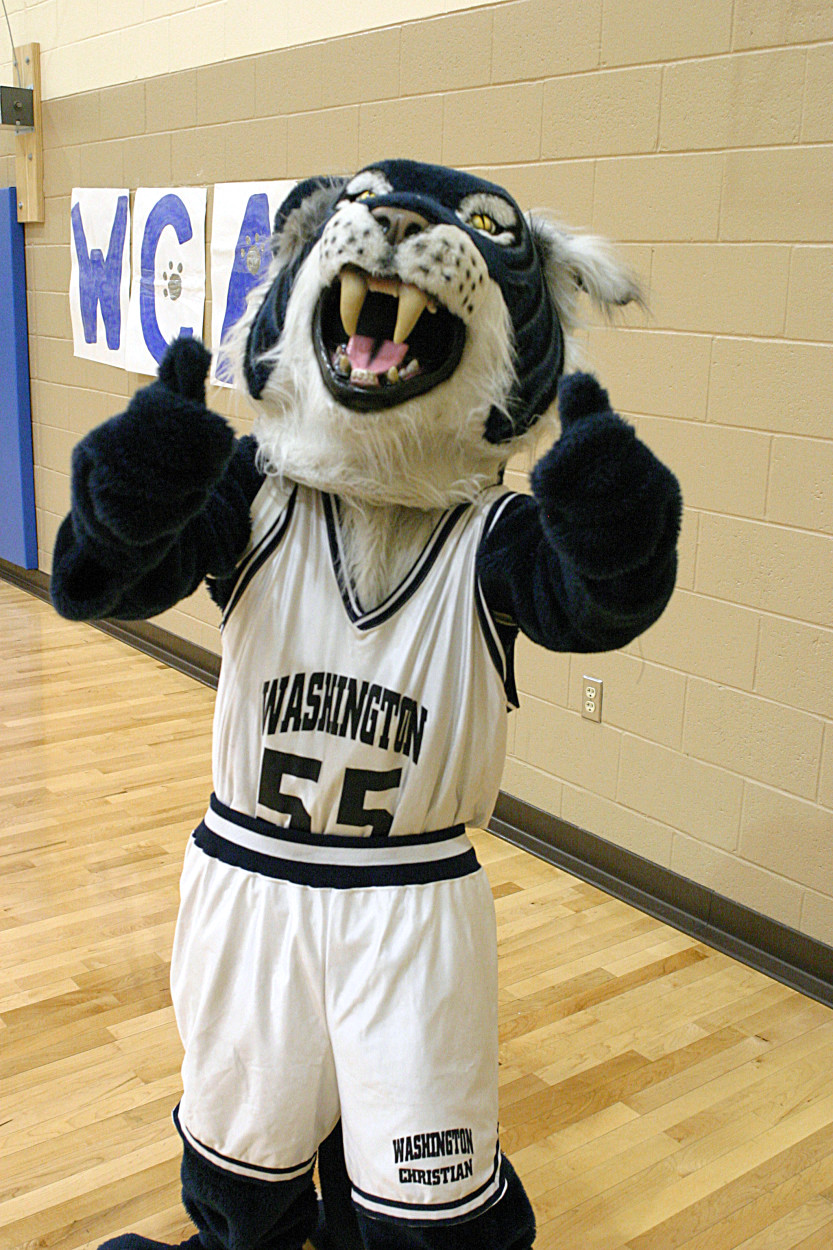
WCA Wildcat

With the opening of its new Olney campus, WCA also gained a number of modern athletic facilities: including a gymnasium with a hardwood basketball court and seating for up to 300, a multi-purpose athletic field employed for soccer and numerous other sports and a baseball field.

The WCA Men's Varsity soccer in 2010-11 won the championship game.

Between 2015 and 2017, the Varsity Boys won back-to-back; the PVAC Division along with the PVAC Championship capped off with two Maryland Christian State Tournament (MCST) Championship final appearances which one game was won. In 2017, they won the Championship Final of the MCST versus Holly Grove Christian School. Within the new expanded PVAC Conference of 11 teams, the boys finished fourth behind Washington International School, Sandy Spring Friends School, and Berman Hebrew Academy.

In recent years, WCA teams have won the following:

2022-2023

- Varsity Boys Soccer Maryland Christian State Tournament Championship

2018-2019

- Varsity Boys Soccer Maryland Christian State Tournament Championship

2017-2018

- Varsity Boys Soccer Maryland Christian State Tournament Championship

2016-2017

- Varsity Girls Soccer PVAC Division Championship
- Varsity Boys Soccer PVAC Division Championship
- Varsity Boys Soccer PVAC Tournament Championship

2015-2016

- Varsity Boys Soccer Division Championship

2013-2014

- Varsity Softball League Championship

2012-2013

- Varsity Girls Soccer Conference Championship

2011-2012

- Varsity Softball League Championship
- Varsity Volleyball League Championship
- Middle School Boys Basketball League Championship

2010-2011

- Varsity Boys Soccer League Championship
- Middle School Baseball League Championship

2009-2010

- Varsity Boys Basketball League Championship
- Varsity Girls Basketball MCST D1 Championship
- Varsity Girls Basketball League Championship
- Varsity Softball League Championship
- Middle School Boys Basketball League Championship

2008-2009

- Varsity Boys Basketball MCST D1 Championship
- Varsity Softball League Championship

== Affiliations ==
- Christian Schools International (CSI)
- Middle States Association Commissions on Elementary and Secondary Schools (MSA-CESS)

== See also ==
- Olney, Maryland
- Christian Schools International
- Montgomery County, Maryland
