= Woman Suffrage Association =

Woman Suffrage Association may refer to:

- National American Woman Suffrage Association (NAWSA), formed in 1890
- National Woman Suffrage Association (NWSA), formed in 1869
- American Woman Suffrage Association (AWSA), formed in 1869
- Connecticut Woman Suffrage Association (CWSA), founded in 1869
- Georgia Woman Suffrage Association, founded in 1890
- Maryland Woman Suffrage Association (MWSA), founded in 1889
- Massachusetts Woman Suffrage Association (MWSA), founded in 1870
- Minnesota Woman Suffrage Association (MWSA), founded in 1881
- New England Woman Suffrage Association (NEWSA), founded in 1868
- Texas Woman Suffrage Association (TWSA), founded in 1903
- Canadian Woman Suffrage Association, founded in 1883
