= Benjamin Hallowell (educator) =

First president of the Maryland Agricultural College (1799–1877)

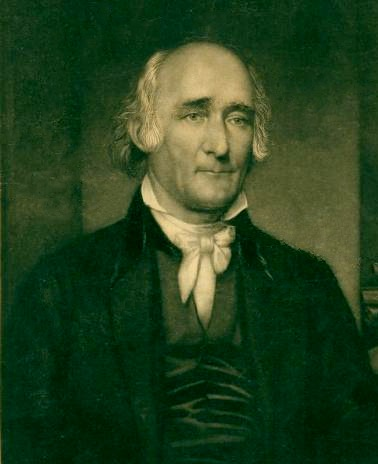
- Benjamin Hallowell (c. 1850s)

President of Maryland Agricultural College
- In office 1859–1860

Personal details
- Born: August 17, 1799 Cheltenham Township, Montgomery County, Pennsylvania, U.S.
- Died: September 7, 1877 (aged 78)
- Resting place: Sandy Spring Friends Meetinghouse cemetery
- Spouse: Margaret (m. 1820; died 1876)
- Relations: Arthur Briggs Farquhar (nephew)
- Children: 3, including Caroline Hallowell Miller

Benjamin Hallowell (August 17, 1799 – September 7, 1877) was the first president of the Maryland Agricultural College.

== Early life ==
Benjamin Hallowell was born in 1799. He went to school at the Westtown Boarding School.

== Personal life ==
Hallowell met his wife Margaret, the sister of William Henry Farquhar, at Westtown School. They married around 1820 and she died in 1876. Together, they had three children:

- Henry C. Hallowell
- Caroline Hallowell Miller, wife of Francis Miller
- Benjamin Hallowell

He was friends with Henry Clay.

== Career ==
In November 1819, he started his first official teaching position at Fair Hill Boarding School in Montgomery County, Maryland. In 1824, Hallowell opened a boarding school in Alexandria, Virginia, where his nephew Arthur Briggs Farquhar would later attend. His most famous student was Robert E. Lee who studied at the school for a month before entering West Point.

Hallowell was elected to the American Philosophical Society in 1854.

On October 4, 1859, Hallowell was appointed as the first president of the Maryland Agricultural College. He would only accept the appointment on condition that the college not use slaves and he would not accept a salary. He helped to develop the college's curriculum, which included Ancient Languages, Modern Languages, Natural Sciences, English, and Mathematics. After one month of serving as the president, he resigned due to illness.

== Death ==
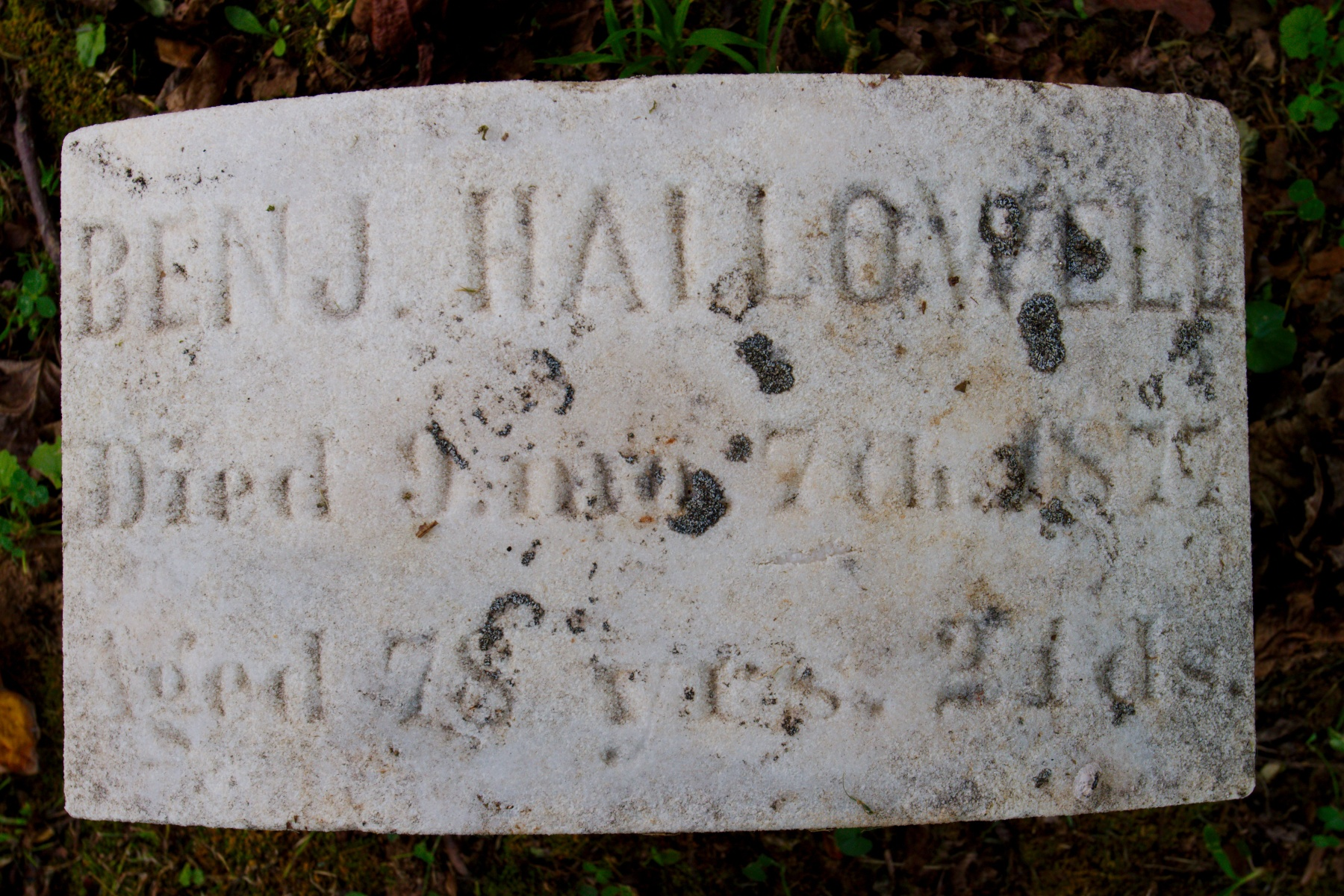
Benjamin Hallowell's grave marker, Sandy Spring Friends Meeting House Cemetery

Hallowell was buried at the Sandy Spring Friends Meetinghouse cemetery.

Academic offices
Preceded by No President	President of the Maryland Agricultural College; 1859	Succeeded by Charles Benedict Calvert (acting)
