= Percival Farquhar =

American investor and financier (1865–1953)

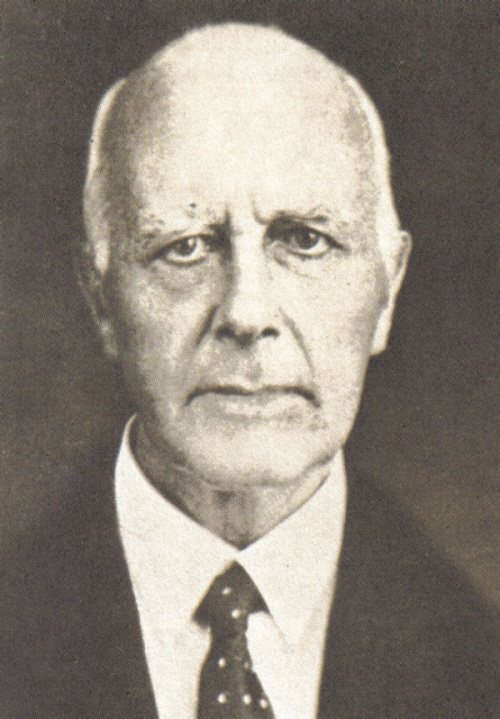
- Percival Farquhar
- Born: October 19, 1865; York, Pennsylvania
- Died: August 5, 1953 (aged 88); New York City
- Occupations: investor and financier
- Years active: 1880s–1920s
- Known for: Investing in railways; neocolonial attitude
- Father: Arthur Briggs Farquhar

Percival Farquhar (October 19, 1865 – August 5, 1953) was an American investor and financier with extensive interests in Latin America and pre-Soviet Russia, including railways, mines, hotels, and restaurants.

== Early life ==
Farquhar was born to a wealthy Maryland-Pennsylvania Episcopalian family, with Quaker roots, at York, Pennsylvania in 1865. His father was Arthur B. Farquhar (1838–1925), founder of a large agricultural equipment works at York, which was called the Pennsylvania Agricultural Works (1856–1889) and later the A.B. Farquhar Company (1889–1951). His mother was Elizabeth N. (née Jessop) Farquhar (1837–1918). His grandfather was William Henry Farquhar.

Percival attended the York Collegiate Institute, spent two years working in his father's office, and then attended the Sheffield Scientific School of Yale University, where he studied science and engineering.

== Career as a lawyer, legislator, investor, and financier ==
After Yale he studied law, entered politics, and was elected to the New York State Legislature. He was a member of the New York State Assembly in the 114th (1891), 115th (1892) (both New York Co., 3rd D.), and 116th (1893) (New York Co., 11th D.) sessions.

His father wrote, "In the meantime he had become associated with me as a partner in my business in New York, from which he drifted into financial operations of larger scope, his activities in this direction leading him to Cuba, South America, and Europe." His father's agricultural equipment business had long had a sizeable export component, selling to distributors who resold in Latin America, South Africa, Australia, Russia, and other places.

Farquhar was vice-president of the Atlantic Coast Electric Railway and the Staten Island Railway, which controlled rail services in New York. He was also partner and director of the Compañía de Electricidad de Cuba in Cuba and partner and vice-president of the Guatemala Railway. In 1910 he became the owner of the Paraguay Central Railway Company. His father wrote in 1922, "My son Percival has an international reputation as a promoter of large enterprises. Among other things he was president of the Brazil Railway Co. and of the Mamore Railway Co. in Brazil, and the railroad from Santa Barros to Guatemala City, called the Guatemala R.R., and was active in building the Cuba R.R. from Havana to Santiago, running nearly the length of the island."

Farquhar developed businesses in Cuba and Central America. He owned railways and mines in Russia and dealt personally with Lenin during the years when those assets were being nationalized and foreign specialists were held over to assist.

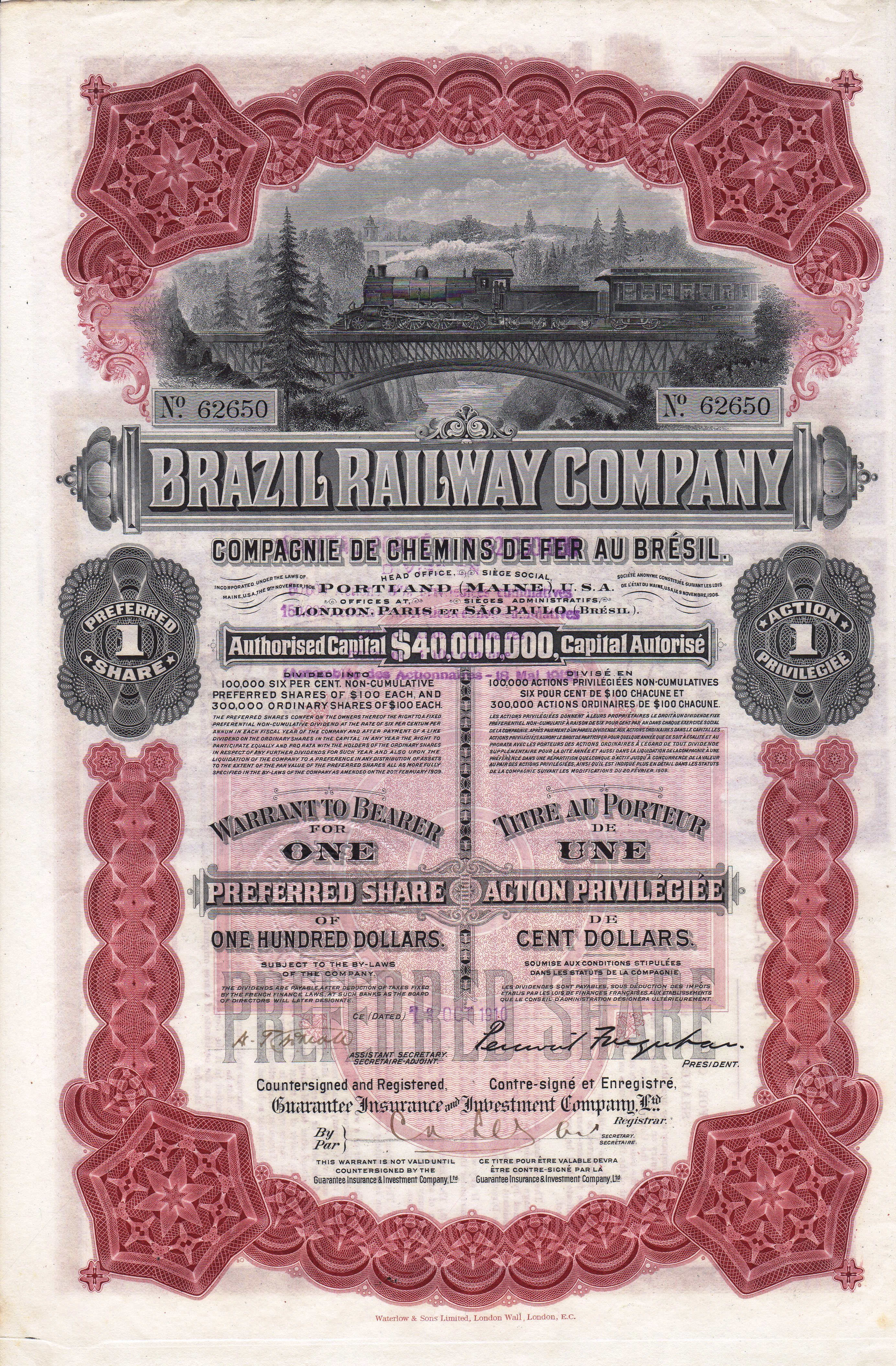
Preferred Share of the Brazil Railway Company, issued 13. October 1910; signed by President Percival Farquhar

Farquhar's dream was to control all the railways of Latin America, in a version of manifest destiny.

Visionary, controversial, and audacious, Farquhar became the greatest private investor in Brazil between 1905 and 1918. A history journal article of 1937 described the way that Farquhar's syndicate during this period was viewed by Brazilians nervous about Yankee ambitions and by British competitors. According to the writer and former minister Ronaldo Costa Couto, Farquhar's empire was comparable to those of Count Francisco Matarazzo and Irineu Evangelista de Souza, The Viscount of Mauá.

The writing on Farquhar is full of contradictions, making it very difficult to sort through the legend, hagiography, and libel found in his biographies.

Professor Francisco Foot Hardman in an interview with the newspaper O Estado de S. Paulo, stated:

One can't say that Farquhar was Satan, but we also cannot take an apologist stance, making him into a great icon of entrepreneurship. He was a typical example of old international capitalism..

A book which exalts his deeds—with a few passages that border on hagiography—is The Last Titan – An American Entrepreneur in Latin America—a dissertation by Charles A. Gauld for Stanford University, under the supervision of Professor Ronald Hilton.

The Brazilian magazine Exame, in a review of the book, said:

Although his admiration of this character is excessive, always treating him as an enlightened capitalist and full of good intentions, Charles Gauld drew from an extraordinary variety of documents and sources....

In contrast, the Brazilian historian Edgard Carone, in his book A República Velha (The Old Republic) says that Farquhar's businesses "lived off government favors".

In the book Chatô – O Rei do Brasil (Chatô – The King of Brazil), the journalist Fernando Morais describes Farquhar as:

king of the Rio Light, the Companhia Telefônica Brasileira and a large number of railways in Brazil, tracks in Russia and coal mines in Central Europe, in addition to sugar mills in Cuba.

It is true that he built and directed numerous businesses in Latin America, many of them in Brazil. His activities were frequently related to governmental concessions and privileges—and to guarantees that governments would receive revenues from the capital invested—which he ably obtained from young and inexperienced local governments, frequently through personal bribery.

A bold and fearless financier, with great experience in the European capital markets, Farquhar considered himself "able to finance anything". According to Gauld, Farquhar "was hungrier for land than anyone in Latin American history since the time of the Incas".

The beginning of the First World War in 1914, cut off his main source of resources and financing, and left Farquhar's already precarious empire—which had created the practicing of issuing debt based on debt—extremely indebted, causing it to crumble. His businesses reached bankruptcy by October 1914. His investors lost all of their capital, and Farquhar was ruined. Despite this setback, he would rise again after the war using the same tactics, to fail again after the 1929 stock market crash. After the revolution of 1930, the government of Getúlio Vargas constrained the areas in which he could work, and Farquhar decided to leave Brazil.

Although the dimensions and scope of his economic activity are impressive due to the large sums of money involved and the fervor of his apparently charitable activities, a more detailed examination of Farquhar's businesses in Brazil shows that they frequently led to the deaths of thousands of native people, the ecological destruction of entire states, abandoned railways, bankruptcies, and even civil wars.

Charles A. Gauld writes:

The genius of Farquhar lay more in his vision and capacity to raise money to expand than in the efficient management or cost control in his 38 businesses.

An avid speculator, he bet especially strongly on his own commercial paper. At the beginning of 1913, Farquhar came to realize that he was bankrupt.

Farquhar had a great ability to get himself into trouble with governments and nationalist groups. But the dislike that he provoked was not totally baseless.

Determined and capable in the promotion of his own self-image, he always made an effort to make the press portray his actions as "the example of a highly successful American capitalist, a true icon of American entrepreneurship", a fact which gained him a few admirers.

Among these were Assis Chateaubriand, King of Brasil, who became the owner of the country's largest journalism network. This friendship greatly contributed to favorable reactions to Farquhar's activities. (Chateaubriand later bought O Jornal, in 1924, using funds provided by Farquhar, supposedly as legal fees.)

Percival Farquhar believed that no country in the world could become developed without good hotels and fine cuisine.

To fill these needs in Brazil at the beginning of the 20th century, Farquhar built in São Paulo the Rotisserie Sportsman and imported, from the famous Elisée Palace Hotel in Paris, the chef Henri Galon, according to Fernando de Morais' book, Chatô – O Rei do Brasil (Chatô – The King of Brazil).

In 1911, Farquhar purchased from the firm Prado, Chaves & Cia control over the Companhia Balneária de Santo Amaro, founded in 1892 which under the direction of Councillor Antonio Prado had been created to organize a tourist beach resort in the place that is today the center of Guarujá. Farquhar's new business was called Companhia Guarujá. An establishment called the Grand Hôtel de la Plage was involved.

== Bibliography ==
- GAULD, Charles. Farquhar, o último titã: um empreendedor americano na América Latina. São Paulo: Editora de Cultura, 2006. Tradução Eliana do Vale.
- FAORO, Raymundo. Os Donos do Poder, volume 2. Ed. Globo: São Paulo, 1998 (13ª edição)
- FERREIRA, Manoel Rodrigues. A Ferrovia do Diabo. Ed. Melhoramentos: São Paulo, 1959 e 2005.

== Sources ==
- ALVES Ivan. O Contestado. Estados, posseiros, companhias – todos brigam pela terra. Coleção Os grandes enigmas de nossa história. Otto Pierre Editores: Rio de Janeiro,1982
- ARAÚJO NETO, Adalberto Coutinho de. A experiência sindical dos ferroviários da E. F. Sorocabana nos anos 1930.Tese de Mestrado, Departamento de História da Faculdade de Letras, Filosofia e Ciências Humanas da USP, São Paulo, 2006
- BROMBERGER, H. A. Les chemins de fer exotiques.... Paris, édition du Moniteur économique et financier, 1913 (in French)
- Os caçadores de concessões no Brasil e o fantasma de Percival Farquhar; Ceci Vieira Juruá
- HIRST, Mônica. História da Diplomacia Brasileira - A Era Vargas, Ministério das Relações Exteriores.
- A Ferrovia do Contestado
- "História de Santa Catarina". Archived from the original on October 27, 2009.
- Governo de Santa Catarina - Site Oficial do Município de Três Barras
- MACHADO, Paulo Pinheiro. Lideranças do Contestado. Editora Unicamp / FAPESP
- Entre a Revolução e o Corporativismo

New York State Assembly
Preceded by James A. Monaghan	New York State Assembly; New York County, 3rd District; 1891-1892	Succeeded by Jacob A. Mittnacht
Preceded by William N. Hoag	New York State Assembly; New York County, 11th District; 1893	Succeeded by James R. Sheffield
