= MedStar Montgomery Medical Center =

- MedStar Health

Geography
- Location: 18101 Prince Philip Drive, Olney, Maryland, United States
- Coordinates: 39°9′14.1″N 77°3′16.9″W

Organization
- Type: General

Services
- Beds: 115

Links
- Website: medstarmontgomery.org
- Lists: Hospitals in Maryland

MedStar Montgomery Medical Center, formerly known as Montgomery General Hospital and Montgomery County General Hospital before then, is a large hospital in Olney, Maryland. The hospital is part of MedStar Health.

== History ==
A local physician, Jacob Wheeler Bird, rented a house between Ashton and Brighton, and he opened five-bed infirmary there, named Wrenwood Hospital, on January 1, 1916. Within three years of its opening, it was clear that the small facility was not large enough for the surrounding area. In 1919, Bird and eight women, who met to roll bandages and sew for community organizations, raised funds to establish a new hospital in the area.

The land for the hospital was bought from the heirs of a local physician, William E. Magruder, who had died. The building's cornerstone was laid on May 31, 1919. Thomas C. Groomes of Rockville was the architect, and Frank H. Karn of Rockville was the builder. The land, equipment, and building ended up costing a total of $50,000 (equivalent to $929,000 in 2025). The facility was originally named Montgomery County General Hospital.

Construction was delayed because of World War I, but Bird decided to open the hospital in 1920, before its construction was complete, because of the Spanish flu epidemic. It admitted its first five patients during a blizzard. Named Montgomery County General Hospital, it originally had 28 beds and, during its first year open, it admitted a total of 596 patients.

In 1977, the original building was demolished and was replaced by a more modern facility, which was renamed Montgomery General Hospital.

In February 2008, the hospital merged with MedStar Health and renamed MedStar Montgomery Medical Center. A $30-million expansion began that included adding a 23,000-square-foot (2,100 m^{2}) emergency department.
