= Etta Haynie Maddox =

American singer (1860–1933)

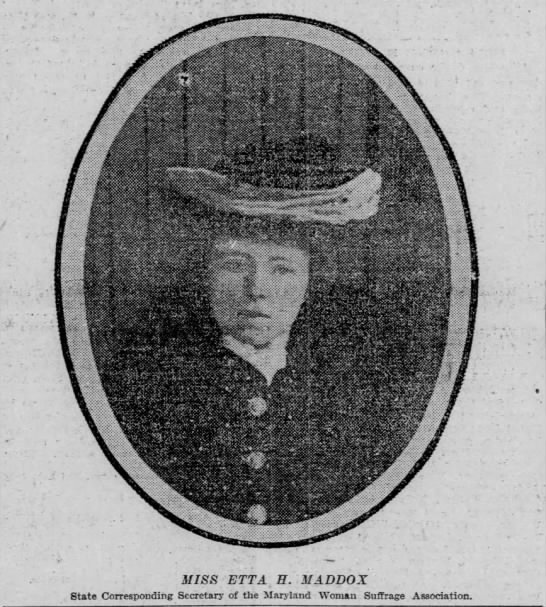
- Died: February 19, 1933; Baltimore
- Resting place: Green Mount Cemetery
- Alma mater: University of Maryland Francis King Carey School of Law; Peabody Institute
- Occupation: Lawyer, suffragist
- Relatives: Emma Maddox Funck
- Awards: Maryland Women's Hall of Fame (2003)

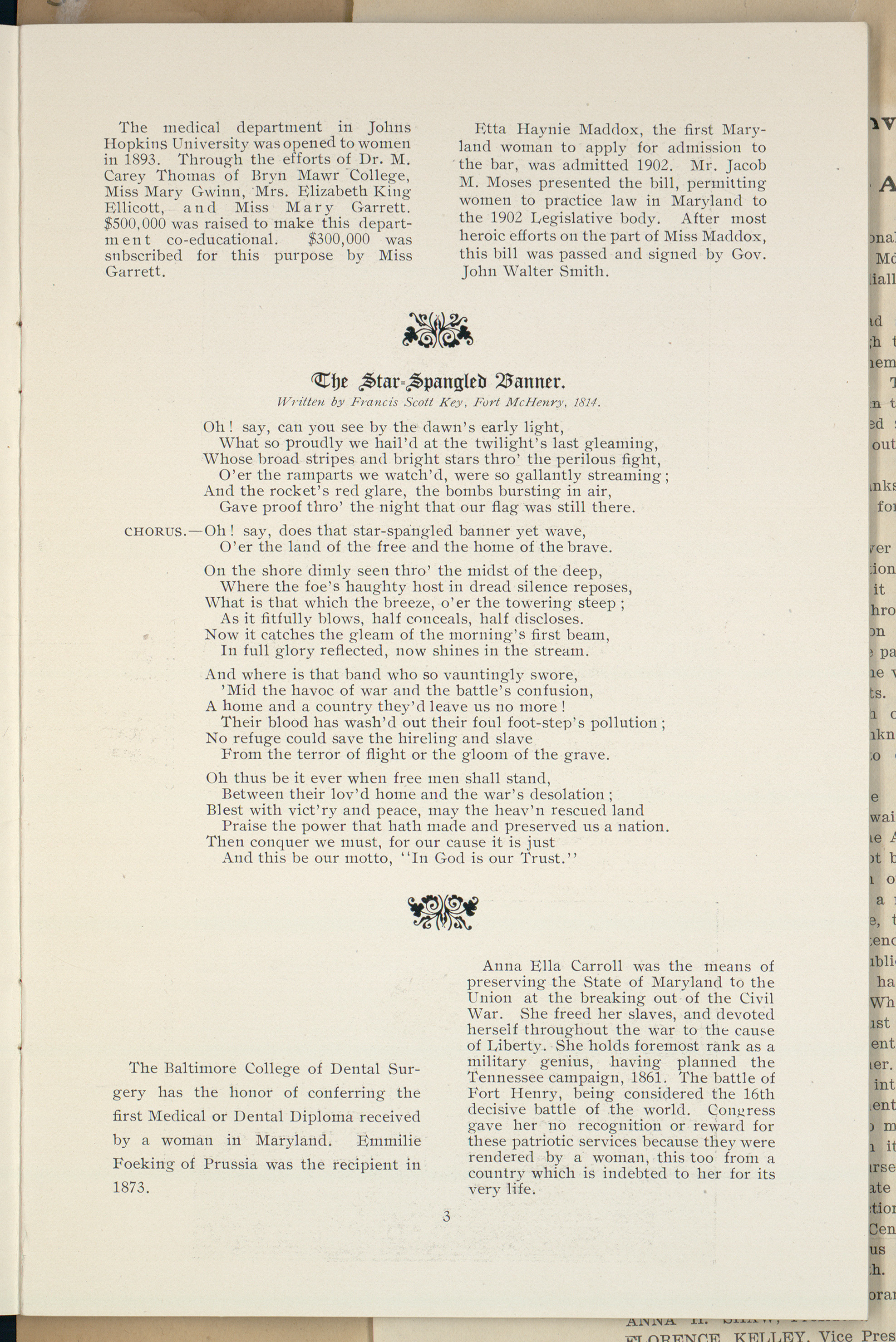
Maddox is mentioned among historic firsts in the Suffrage Convention booklet, Baltimore, 1906

Henrietta Haynie Maddox (January 6, 1860 – February 19, 1933) was a vocalist, lawyer and suffragist. Maddox became the first woman in Maryland licensed to practice law in 1902. She fought for the rights of women to take the bar exam and practice law in the state of Maryland. She was a successful vocalist who studied at the Peabody Conservatory of Music before starting a second career as an attorney. She was the co-founder of the Maryland Woman Suffrage Association in 1894 and campaigned for equal pay for equal work. Maddox wrote the first Maryland suffrage bill introduced to the General Assembly on February 23, 1910.

== Early life and education ==
Maddox was born in Baltimore, Maryland, and though her exact date of birth is unknown it is most often recorded as January 6, 1860. Her parents were John T. Maddox, a local Baltimore magistrate and Susanna Moore. Both of her two sisters, Emma Maddox Funck and Margaret A. Maddox were accomplished suffragists as well. She attended Eastern Female High School and graduated in 1873 before studying voice at the Peabody Conservatory of Music. Maddox was independent-minded and began traveling across the country as a vocalist in 1875. During this time she was already involved in the local suffrage movement and her colleagues encouraged her to apply to law school. Maddox was determined to attend Baltimore Law School and graduated in 1901. She was the first woman to attend Baltimore Law School and the only woman in her class.

== Career ==
As a successful mezzo-soprano vocalist Maddox performed for many years across the country including as lead vocalist for the Marine Band. She performed and directed in local Baltimore church choirs and offered vocal lessons. As a strong vocalist, she often sung at the opening of suffrage club meetings.

Baltimore Law School accepted its first class of students in 1900. Maddox was the only female in a class of 13. Maddox stated in an article to the Baltimore Sun that she became fascinated by the study of law. She graduated from Baltimore Law School as a noteworthy scholar. Nonetheless, as a woman she was not permitted to take the bar exam or practice law according to Maryland statutes in 1901.

== Right of women to practice law ==
The law at this time did not permit women to take the bar exam or practice law on the grounds that the applicable statute, the Act of 1898, still maintained wording that permitted men to practice law while excluding women. The practice of law was not legally considered a natural given right. Maryland property laws forbid married women from participating in various forms of employment just a few years earlier. Though this section of the law changed and Maddox was unmarried it was still not expected that a woman would choose to become a lawyer to the extent of taking the bar exam and practicing as a fully licensed attorney. Maddox petitioned the court of appeals to permit her to take the bar exam but her request was denied.

Just before Maddox brought the issue before the legislature 37 states had already passed laws permitting women to take the bar exam in the late 19th century. She took her case to the state legislature where it was introduced by State Senator Jacob M. Moses and was signed into law by Maryland Governor John Walter Smith in 1902. Maddox became the first woman in Maryland to be permitted to take the bar exam, become licensed and proceed to practice law. Maddox established a private practice and handled will and estate claims. In addition she practiced family law and served women in low socioeconomic circumstances. Her suffrage colleagues at the Maryland Suffrage Association awarded her a medal for her achievements as the first woman lawyer in Maryland and for her fight for the key legal enactments at the state level that would permit women in the future to become lawyers.

== Suffrage activism ==
Maddox and her sister, Emma Maddox Funck, had been participating in the suffrage movement long before she determined to become an attorney and win the right of Maryland women to practice law. Both were involved in the Maryland Suffrage Association in 1894. She was engaged in a variety of roles including chairwoman of legislative work and corresponding secretary. Maddox was known for attending almost every suffrage case hearing during General Assembly sessions starting in 1908 over a period of years. This study of individual judges on the bench may have honed her legal skills leading to a more informed strategy when approaching the court herself.

Maddox is known for writing the first suffrage bill submitted to the Maryland legislature on February 23, 1910. She led the hearing in support of suffrage for her state along with other prominent suffragists in the movement. Leaders and speakers were bolstered by the presence of 400 suffragists at the hearing. Speakers extolling the benefits of suffrage for Marylanders included her sister, Emma Maddox Funck, Reverend Anna Howard Shaw, and Reverend Dr. John Roach Straton. Reverend Shaw's words about women entering the workforce as the twentieth century began were particularly powerful. Nonetheless, the bill was tabled the following month. But the failure of the legislature to pass a suffrage bill did not prevent Maddox from continuing to fight for change in Maryland.

== Personal life ==
Maddox died on February 19, 1933, at the home of her sister. She was buried in Green Mount Cemetery.

== See also ==
- Married Women's Property Acts in the United States
- Women's suffrage in the United States
- List of suffragists and suffragettes
- List of first women lawyers and judges in Maryland
