= Isaac Briggs =

American engineer (1763-1825)

- Born: 1763; Haverford, Pennsylvania, British America.
- Died: January 5, 1825 (aged 61–62); Brookeville, Maryland, U.S.
- Education: University of Pennsylvania (B.A., M.A.)
- Occupations: Engineer; surveyor; manufacturer
- Spouse: Hannah Brooke (m. 1794)
- Children: 8
- Relatives: Arthur Briggs Farquhar (nephew)

Isaac Briggs (1763– January 5, 1825) was an American engineer, surveyor and manufacturer. He lived much of his adult life with his family in Brookeville, Maryland.

== Early life ==
Isaac Briggs was born in Haverford, Pennsylvania in 1763 to Samuel and Mary Briggs, two Quakers. He studied at the College of Pennsylvania (the University of Pennsylvania today), where he graduated with a Bachelor of Arts in 1783 and a Master of Arts in engineering in 1786.

== Personal life ==
After his graduation, Briggs traveled, moving to Georgia and Georgetown, Washington, D.C. He married Hannah Brooke on August 27, 1794 and settled near Brookeville in Montgomery County, Maryland in their home Sharon, a 245 acres (99 ha) estate inherited from Hannah's father, Roger Brooke IV. Together, they had eight children, including Margaret, who married William Henry Farquhar.

Additionally, Briggs was a devout Quaker and a member of the American Philosophical Society. He was close friends with both Thomas Jefferson and James Madison. In keeping with his Quaker beliefs, Briggs was an avid abolitionist and never owned slaves. He was a member of the Pennsylvania Society for Promoting the Abolition of Slavery as well as an abolitonist society in Wilmington, Delaware, through which he was active in supporting free black members of his community who were at risk of being kidnapped and sold back into enslavement.

== Career ==
On February 1, 1788, the Georgia legislature awarded Augusta inventor William Longstreet and his associate Isaac Briggs a patent for a steam engine. It is the only patent issued by the state because this was before the adoption of the Federal Constitution. In 1807 their engine was used to power a boat on a 5-mile journey against the current on the Savannah River. Only days before, Robert Fulton had sailed his new steamboat, the Clermont, from New York City up the Hudson River to Albany.)

He was an unsuccessful candidate for the U.S. House of Representatives in 1789.

Briggs was a renowned surveyor and engineer. During 1791-1792, he assisted Andrew Ellicott in the survey of the boundaries of the original District of Columbia (see Boundary Markers of the Original District of Columbia). In 1803 President Thomas Jefferson appointed him to be the Surveyor General of the Mississippi Territory. In 1814, he relocated to Wilmington, Delaware to work as a superintendent of Thomas Little & Company, a textile mill. In 1818, New York Governor DeWitt Clinton appointed Briggs as one of the chief engineers of the Erie Canal. He returned home in January 1819 and was appointed by Thomas Moore in March 1819 as a chief engineer in Virginia on the James River and Kanawha Canal. He would be promoted to principal engineer after Moore's death in 1822, but did not complete any major portion of the canal.

Additionally, he was devoted to developing domestic agriculture and manufacturing. He co-founded the American Board of Agriculture and a cotton mill and manufacturing town at Triadelphia in Montgomery County, Maryland in 1809.

== Death ==
Briggs became ill while working on the James River and Kanawha Canal in Virginia. He died at home at Sharon near Brookeville on January 5, 1825.
