= Elizabeth King Ellicott =

American suffragist (1858–1914)

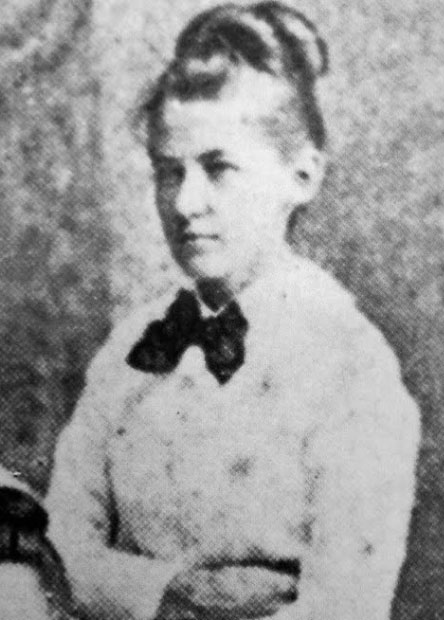
- Born: Elizabeth King; 1858; Baltimore, Maryland
- Died: May 14, 1914 (aged 55–56)
- Education: Howland Institute
- Spouse: William Miller Ellicott (m. 1900)

Elizabeth King Ellicott (1858–1914) was an American suffragist.

== Biography ==
Ellicott was born in 1858 to a wealthy Baltimore family. After studying at the Howland Institute, she returned to Baltimore. Several years later, she and several friends opened the Bryn Mawr School for Girls in 1885. That same group four years later donated $500,000 to Johns Hopkins University, on the condition that they allow women to attend the medical university. In 1894, she founded the Women's Literary Club and Arundel club in Baltimore. In 1900, the latter club would merge into the Maryland Federation of Women's Clubs, of which Ellicott was elected president of the board. That same year, she married William Miller Ellicott.

Six years later, after resigning from the board, she became involved in the suffrage movement. She organized the Equal Suffrage League of Baltimore out of the nearly defunct Livermore Equal Rights League. The league worked closely with the Maryland Woman Suffrage Association. The Baltimore League broke permanently from the Maryland League in 1910, when they submitted an equal suffrage bill to the Maryland General Assembly, which was quickly defeated. After the break, Ellicott formed a competing association, the State Equal Franchise League of Maryland, in 1911. The club began publishing The New Voter, Maryland's first suffrage magazine. After suffering from ill health for years, she died of pneumonia and a subsequent heart failure on May 14, 1914. She left about $250,000 to many establishments. A large portion of the money went to establishing the Elizabeth King Ellicott Fellowship for the Political Education of Women at Goucher College.
