= Moira Geoffrion =

American sculptor

Moira Marti Geoffrion (née Moira Marti; born 1944) is an American sculptor.

== Biography ==
A native of Olney, Maryland, Geoffrion is the daughter of Swiss-born philosopher Fritz Marti and his wife Gertrude, and was one of six children.

She received her bachelor of fine arts degree from Boston University School of Fine and Applied Arts in 1965. She followed this with study at Indiana University before receiving her master of fine arts degree from Southern Illinois University Edwardsville.

She has exhibited widely, both in groups and on her own, and is represented in numerous public collections including those of the Indianapolis Museum of Art and the Midwest Museum of American Art. Among the grants and awards which she has received during her career are a Mellon Foundation research grant; several grants from the National Endowment for the Arts; an ICIP/Fulbright grant; and an Exxon distinguished scholars grant. She has taught at the University of Notre Dame and the University of Arizona, and served as the president of the Mid-America College Art Association from 1991 until 1992; she has also been on the board of the National Council of Arts Administrators.
