= Sandy Spring Friends Meetinghouse =

Historic church in Maryland, United States

- U.S. National Register of Historic Places
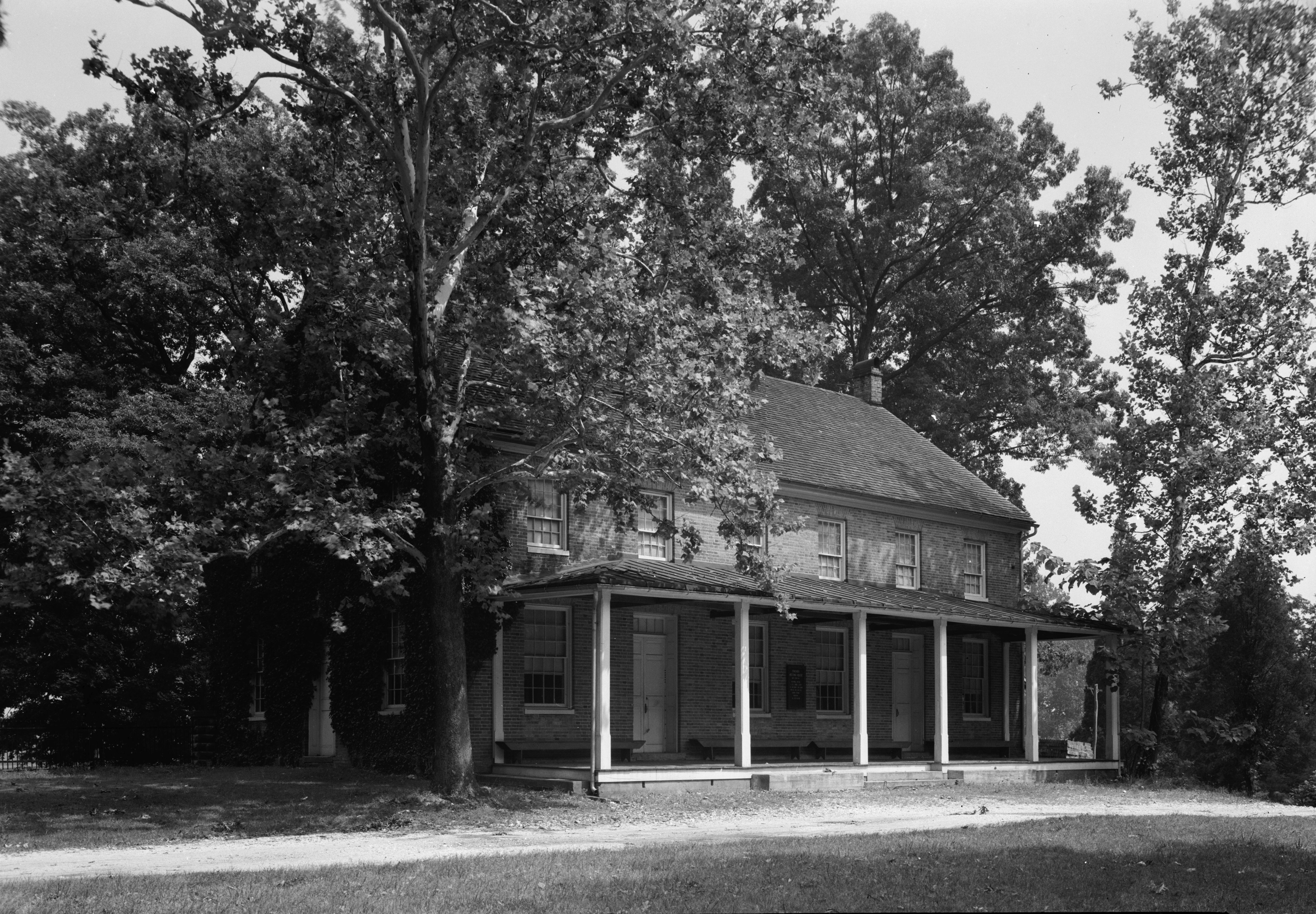
- Sandy Spring Friends Meeting House in 1936

- Location within Maryland Location within the United States
- Location: 17715 Meeting House Road, Sandy Spring, Maryland
- Coordinates: 39°8′50″N 77°1′31″W
- Area: 9 acres (3.6 ha)
- Built: 1817
- Architectural style: Federal
- NRHP reference No.: 72000587
- Added to NRHP: September 22, 1972

The Sandy Spring Friends Meetinghouse is a historic building located at Sandy Spring, Montgomery County, Maryland. It is a large, Flemish bond brick, Federal-style Quaker Meeting House built in 1817. The meetinghouse is on two acres deeded by James Brooke in the 1750s, for the use of the Quaker Meeting. Nearby is the cemetery where he and many of his descendants were buried.

In the mid-1900s a community house was built adjacent, "where first day school" classes and "young friends" meet. The weekly meeting (congregation) was also essential in the formation of Sandy Spring Friends School, and Friends House (an assisted living community), both built nearby on Norwood Road.

It was listed on the National Register of Historic Places in 1972.
