= Maryland Woman Suffrage Association =

Woman's suffrage organization in Maryland, US

The Maryland Woman Suffrage Association (MWSA) was a woman's suffrage organization in Maryland, USA, founded in 1889.

== About ==
The MWSA was created to fight for women's suffrage in Maryland. Carolyn Hallowell Miller started the group on January 11, 1889. The group included both men and women. MWSA met in members' homes and worked to plan statewide conventions and conferences.

The first president was Miller, though only for a short time. She was followed by Mary Bentley Thomas. In 1902, MWSA opened a headquarters in Baltimore. In 1904, Emma Maddox Funck became president. MWSA invited the National American Woman Suffrage Association to hold its 1906 conference in Baltimore.

In 1910, MWSA worked closely with Elizabeth King Ellicott and presented a bill for suffrage for all to the Maryland House of Delegates. The bill was soundly rejected by the delegates. In 1911, there was a split in the group, with some leaving MWSA to form the State Equal Franchise League of Maryland. MWSA continued to provide an amendment for women's suffrage in the Maryland Constitution in 1912, 1914 and 1916, with no success.

== Notable members ==
- Emma Maddox Funck, president.
- Etta Haynie Maddox, corresponding secretary.
