= Emma Maddox Funck =

American suffragist

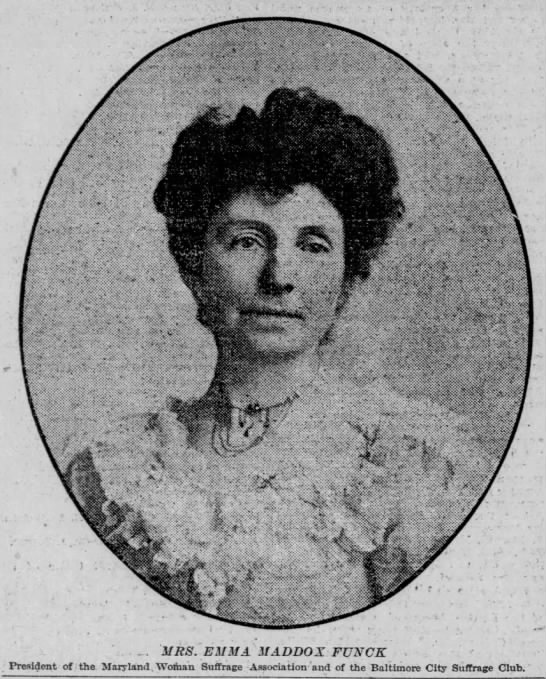
Emma Maddox Funck in 1906.

Emma Maddox Funck (November 19, 1853 – March 21, 1940) was an American suffragist and served as president of the Maryland Woman Suffrage Association (MWSA).

== Biography ==
Funck was born in Baltimore on November 19, 1853, where she attended public school, graduating from Eastern High School. Her sister, Etta Haynie Maddox, was the first Maryland woman to pass the state bar. Funck attended the Peabody Conservatory of Music and was involved in music in Baltimore. She also sang, performing with her sister, Etta.

She married a member of the Men's League for Woman Suffrage, Dr. J. William Funck, in 1892. Emma Funck led the Baltimore City Society starting in 1897 and continued until 1920. She became the president of the Maryland Women Suffrage Association (MWSA) in 1904, also holding that position until 1920. During her tenure at MWSA, Funck worked on drafting resolutions for an amendment to the Maryland State Constitution allowing women's suffrage. In 1906, Funck brought the National Women's Suffrage Convention to Baltimore.

Funck was also involved in advocating for women to work in the Baltimore police force. She also raised issues about women in the workplace.

In 1920, after women gained the right to vote, Funck helped to organize the Maryland Federation of Republican Women and served as the first president. Funck ran for Clerk of the Court of Common Pleas in Baltimore in 1928, becoming the "first woman to run for a city-wide office in Baltimore."

Funck died in her home in Baltimore on March 21, 1940, after suffering a week-long illness. She was buried in Green Mount Cemetery.
