= Sandy Spring Museum =

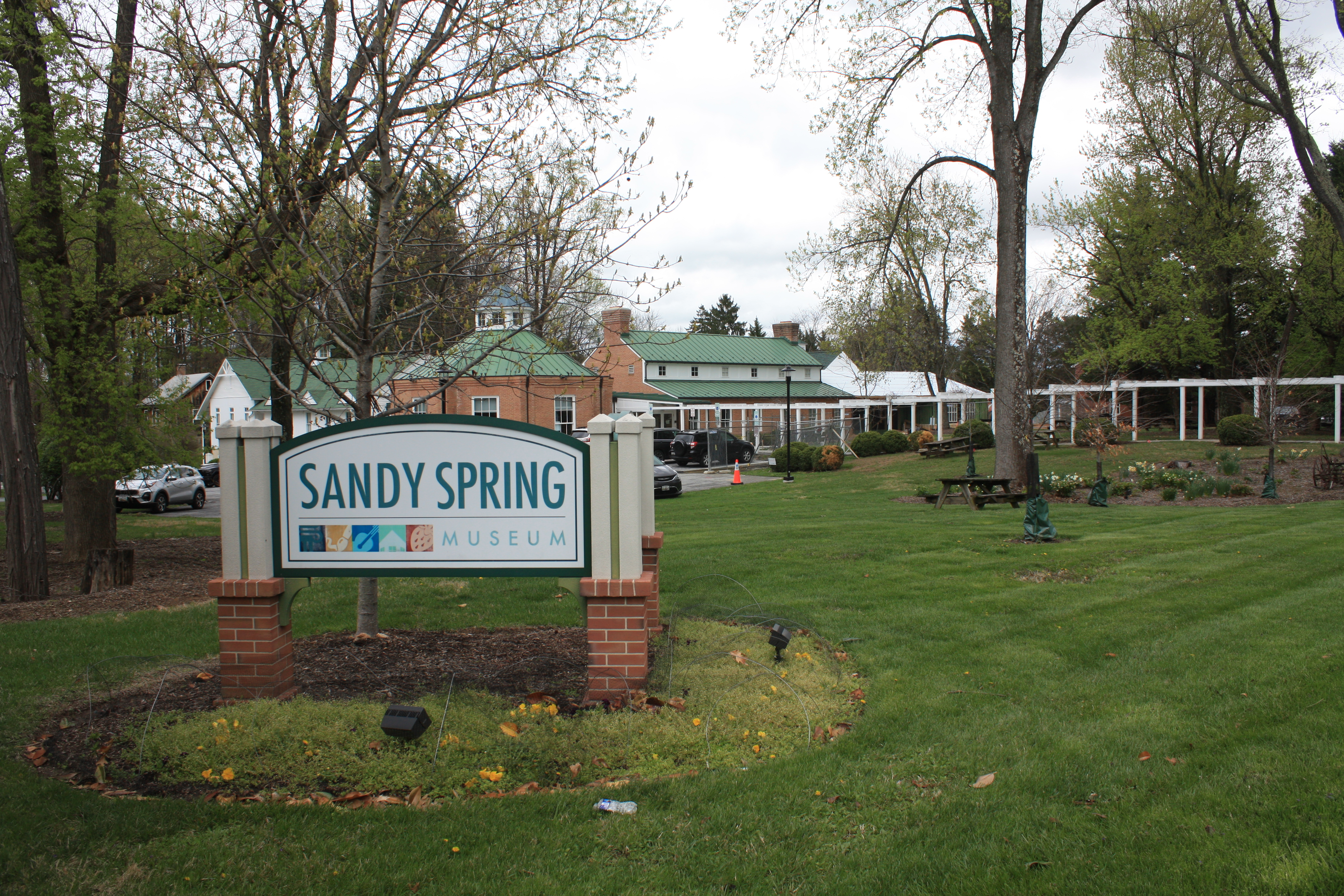
- Sandy Spring Museum (April 2025)
- Established: January 5, 1981; 45 years ago
- Location: Sandy Spring, Maryland, U.S.
- Coordinates: 39.149577°N 77.021271°W
- Type: 501(c)(3) nonprofit history museum
- Director: Allison Weiss
- President: David Hickson
- Website: www.sandyspringmuseum.org

Sandy Spring Museum is a local history museum preserving the history of the area around Sandy Spring, Maryland. It supports community-driven cultural arts and educational programs to help build a sense of place and belonging.

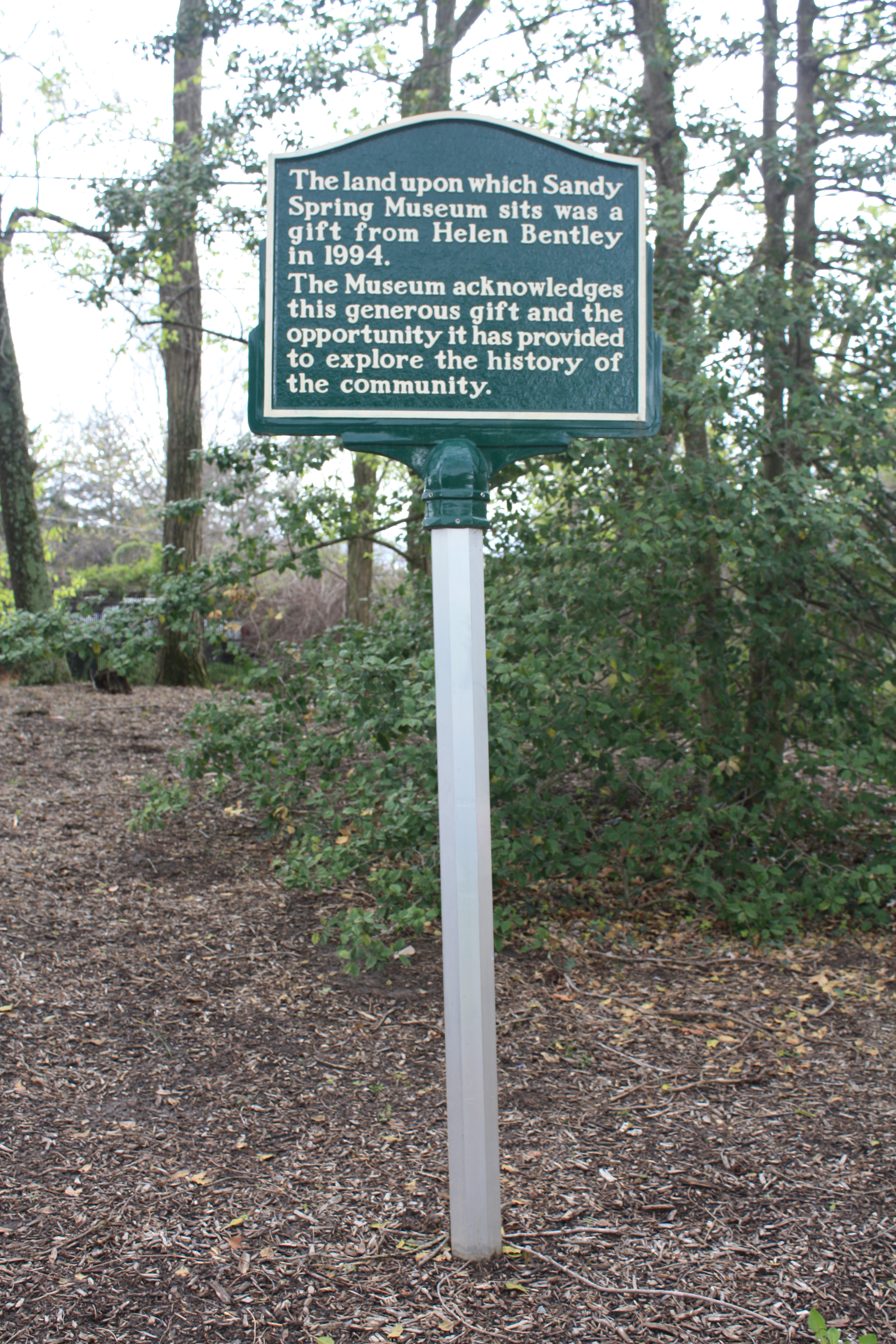
A plaque commemorating the gift of land from Helen Bentley to the Sandy Spring Museum (April 2025)

== History ==
An insurance salesman and auctioneer named Delmas Wood started the Sandy Spring Museum in 1981 because he thought Sandy Spring's history was gradually being lost as older residents died. Wood wanted a place to preserve antique furniture, farm equipment, photographs, paintings, and documents of the Sandy Spring area. Florence Virginia Barrett Lehman also helped found the museum.

The museum was originally located in the basement of a Sandy Spring National Bank branch in Olney. In October 1986, it moved to Tall Timbers, a brick four-story Colonial house that had been the home of Gladys Brooke Tumbleson, who had died earlier that year. Tumbleson descended from the Brooke family, for which nearby Brookeville was named. Tumbleson sold the building to the museum for less than market value.

Mary Jane Forman Rice founded the Sandy Spring Museum Garden Club, a group of volunteers who tend to the museum's courtyard garden, in 1992.

Helen Bentley, the widow of baseball star Jack Bentley, donated 7.5 acres (30,000 m^{2}) of land on Bentley Road in Sandy Spring to the museum in 1994. The Bentleys' ancestors had lived in Sandy Spring since the late 18th century. Almost the entire cost of the new location was contributed by local donors. The building was designed by local architects Miche Booz and Thomas Bucci. They based the design local 18th century barns and houses in order to make sure it would blend in with the area. The arched walkway was originally planned from the road to the entrance, but it was shortened to save costs. The architects gave a distinctive feel to each room of the building, and Booz called the central courtyard the "best room in the museum".

The museum's new building on Bentley Road opened in 1997, providing more room for the museum's exhibits.

Maryland Historical Trust awarded the Educational Excellence Award to Sandy Spring Museum for its interactive exhibit and web site in 2001.

In 2007, a 3,500-square-foot (330 m^{2}) addition opened, providing a research library and a collection storage facility for the museum.

In July 2022, the Montgomery County Commission on Women created and buried a time capsule at the Sandy Spring Museum to be opened in July 2072. The capsule contained photos, maps, and written works.

== Exhibits ==
Sandy Spring Museum's exhibits include a replica of a 19th-century classroom, a replica of a blacksmith's shop, a replica of a general store, and a tractor made from a Model T Ford. The museum has archived more than 15,000 artifacts and photographs from the area around Sandy Spring. Some of its collection dates back to 1650.

There are temporary exhibitions that rotate quarterly, which often focus on art and history or art and current events. The artists featured are frequently but not exclusively local. A windowed gallery displays art by the faculty of Montgomery College.

Two new exhibits were designed by locals in 2014. One of the exhibits is about veterans transitioning from life in a combat zone to life as a civilian. Another exhibit recreated an existing exhibit about community gathering spaces.
