= Global Mission Church =

Baptist church in Seongnam, South Korea

Global Mission (Jiguchon) Church is a Baptist megachurch located in the Bundang area of Seongnam, Gyeonggi Province, South Korea. The church boasts over 25,000 people in attendance every Sunday at its worship locations in Bundang and Suji District, and with over 30,000 people registered as members.

The church also has Global Department with worship services in English, Japanese, Mongolian, Chinese, and Japanese. The English Ministry (GEM) is led by Rev. Stanley Park.

GMC is actively involved in world missions and the Evangelism Explosion (E.E.) program. In 2008 it began its first E.E. in English headed by Sansook Ko. Over 300 members of the Global Missions Church are involved in E.E.

== History ==
It was founded in January 1994 by Daniel Dong-Won Lee. The church began as a 60-member church dedicated to spreading the gospel through missions with strong focus on cell-church ministry.

In 2011, Rev. Lee entered early retirement and was succeeded by Dr. Peter Chin.

in 2025, David Woojoon Kim was voted in 97% by the church congregation as the 4th Senior Pastor. Prior to coming to Korea, Kim was pastoring the Good Community Church of Torrance, CA which became one of the largest Southern Baptist Korean churches in the United States. He is a graduate of UC Berkeley and Stanford University and received his theological education from the conservative Southwestern Baptist Theological Seminary (Master of Divinity, Ph.D.) He has spoken as a keynote speaker during the annual Southern Baptist Convention in August 2025. Kim is fluent in Spanish, Korean, and English. He is a strong proponent of gospel-centered discipleship and expository preaching.
