= Olney, Maryland =

- Census-designated place
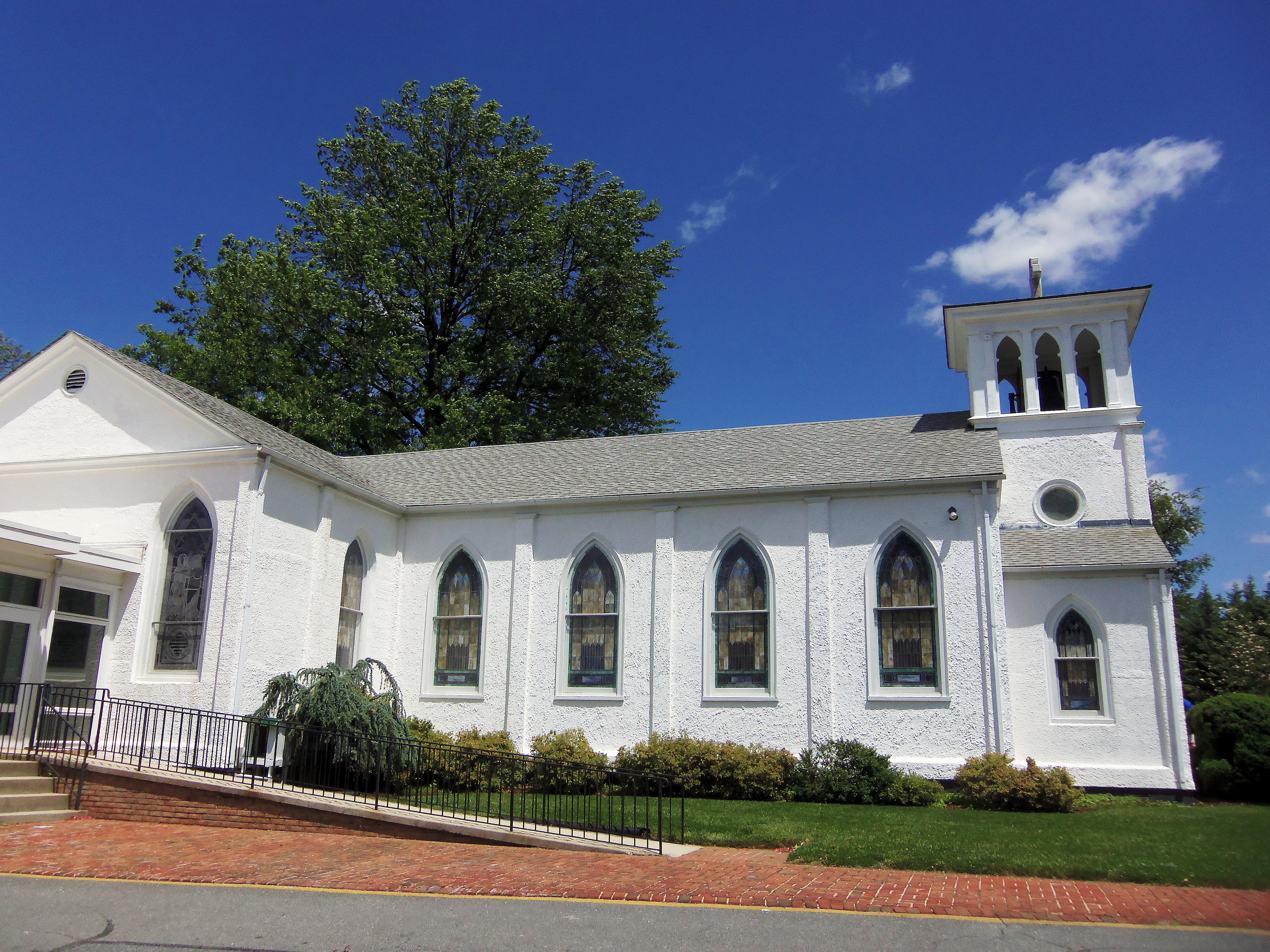
- Olney's St. John's Episcopal Church in 2013

- Location of Olney in Maryland
- Coordinates: 39°08′11″N 77°04′17″W
- Country: United States
- State: Maryland
- County: Montgomery

Area
  - Total: 16.22 sq mi (42.02 km^{2})
  - Land: 16.18 sq mi (41.91 km^{2})
  - Water: 0.042 sq mi (0.11 km^{2})
- Elevation: 499 ft (152 m)

Population (2020)
  - Total: 35,820
  - Density: 2,213.6/sq mi (854.69/km^{2})
- Time zone: UTC−5 (Eastern (EST))
  - Summer (DST): UTC−4 (EDT)
- ZIP codes: 20830, 20832, 20833
- Area codes: 301, 240
- FIPS code: 24-58900
- GNIS feature ID: 2389620

Olney is a census-designated place and an unincorporated area in Montgomery County, Maryland, United States. It is located in the north central part of the county, thirteen miles (21 km) north of Washington, D.C.

Olney was largely agricultural until the 1960s, when growth of Washington, D.C.'s suburbs led to its conversion into a mostly residential area. It has a total population of 35,820 as of the 2020 United States census.

== History ==
In 1763, Richard Brooke received a patent for a tract of land located in the Province of Maryland. Originally known as Mechanicsville or Fair Hill, the village which became Olney was established in 1800. The area was mostly farmland, but it soon began attracting artisans. Early residents Sarah Brooke and Dr. Charles Farquhar were devotees of the English poet William Cowper, and named their home after the poet's hometown of Olney in England. The area was later named for their home, which still stands and is known as the Olney House. In the town's center was a blacksmith, William Kelley's wheelwright shop, Canby's pottery factory, and a Benedict Duley's store.

The Brooke family held the largest tracts of land in Olney, whose central village was at the intersection of the Rockville to Baltimore road, and the one which connected Washington with Westminster to the north. The Quaker community in Sandy Spring thrived just to Olney's east. The Sandy Spring Museum is a historical museum featuring educational programs and displays. St. John's Episcopal Church was established in 1842 and survives to this day.

Although not as involved in the Civil War as areas of Maryland to the west, Olney residents still experienced the tug-of-war between loyalty to the plantation economy of the South and to the Federal government in Maryland's midst. Both Union and Confederate forces made stops in Olney during the war. Union Generals George B. McClellan and Ambrose Burnside led soldiers through in the midst of the Maryland Campaign in 1862. During the Gettysburg campaign in 1863, Confederate General J. E. B. Stuart marched between 10,000 and 20,000 troops north through the village and raided it of supplies, including horses and crops from surrounding farms in which they bivouacked.

Olney served as the original headquarters of the Emergency Management Institute, founded in 1951 as the Civil Defense Staff College (CDSC) to provide training for civil defense. While there, the college built "Rescue Street," a training center designed to resemble atomic bomb ruins. The CDSC was soon relocated to Battle Creek, Michigan due to security concerns of a potential attack on Washington, D.C. during the Cold War.

== Geography ==
Olney has a total area of 13.0 square miles (34 km^{2}), all land.

Olney's town center sits at the intersection of state route 97 (Georgia Avenue) and route 108 (Olney-Laytonsville Road). The town, larger than any other in the neighboring areas, lies south of Brookeville, west of Sandy Spring, east-northeast of Gaithersburg, north-northeast of Rockville, and north of Aspen Hill.

== Demographics ==
Historical population
Census	Pop.	Note	%±
2000	31,438		—
2010	33,844		7.7%
2020	35,820		5.8%
source: 2010–2020

=== Racial and ethnic composition ===
Olney CDP, Maryland – Racial and ethnic composition Note: the US Census treats Hispanic/Latino as an ethnic category. This table excludes Latinos from the racial categories and assigns them to a separate category. Hispanics/Latinos may be of any race.
Race / Ethnicity (NH = Non-Hispanic)	Pop 2000	Pop 2010	Pop 2020	% 2000	% 2010	% 2020
White alone (NH)	23,949	22,872	21,061	76.18%	67.58%	54.9%
Black or African American alone (NH)	2,734	3,613	4,366	8.70%	10.68%	14.7%
Native American or Alaska Native alone (NH)	63	34	43	0.20%	0.10%	0.12%
Asian alone (NH)	2,520	3,654	4,531	8.02%	10.80%	11.7%
Native Hawaiian or Pacific Islander alone (NH)	7	3	4	0.02%	0.01%	0.01%
Other race alone (NH)	64	84	183	0.20%	0.25%	0.51%
Mixed race or Multiracial (NH)	525	713	1,829	1.67%	2.11%	5.11%
Hispanic or Latino (any race)	1,576	2,871	3,803	5.01%	8.48%	12.1%
Total	31,438	33,844	35,820	100.00%	100.00%	100.00%

=== 2020 census ===
As of the 2020 census, Olney had a population of 35,820. The median age was 43.0 years. 23.7% of residents were under the age of 18 and 17.6% of residents were 65 years of age or older. For every 100 females there were 92.2 males, and for every 100 females age 18 and over there were 88.4 males age 18 and over.

98.7% of residents lived in urban areas, while 1.3% lived in rural areas.

There were 12,211 households in Olney, of which 38.0% had children under the age of 18 living in them. Of all households, 66.7% were married-couple households, 9.4% were households with a male householder and no spouse or partner present, and 21.0% were households with a female householder and no spouse or partner present. About 15.3% of all households were made up of individuals and 7.6% had someone living alone who was 65 years of age or older.

There were 12,466 housing units, of which 2.0% were vacant. The homeowner vacancy rate was 0.7% and the rental vacancy rate was 4.1%.

Racial composition as of the 2020 census
Race	Number	Percent
White	21,771	60.8%
Black or African American	4,435	12.4%
American Indian and Alaska Native	118	0.3%
Asian	4,547	12.7%
Native Hawaiian and Other Pacific Islander	12	0.0%
Some other race	1,397	3.9%
Two or more races	3,540	9.9%
Hispanic or Latino (of any race)	3,803	10.6%

=== 2010 census ===
In the 2010 U.S. census, there were 33,844 people, 11,606 households, and 9,447 families residing in the area. The population density was 2,603.4 inhabitants per square mile (1,005.2/km^{2}). There were 11,879 housing units at an average density of 913.8 units per square mile (352.8 units/km^{2}). The ethnic makeup of the area was 75.1% White, 11.9% African American, 12.0% Asian, 8.5% Hispanic or Latino, and 0.53% Native American. 3.1% of the population identifies with "Some Other Race."

There were 11,606 households, of which 81.4% were family households. Among all households:

- 41.7% had children under the age of 18 living with them.
- 67.2% were married couples living together.
- 11.0% had a woman householder with no husband present.
- 3.1% had a man householder with no wife present.
- 22.8% had individuals 65 years and over.
- 18.6% were non-families.

The average household size was 2.91 and the average family size was 3.25.

28.9% of residents were under the age of 20, 25.8% from 20 to 44, 34.4% from 45 to 64, and 10.8% 65 years of age or older. The median age was 41.9 years. For every 100 women, there were 91.8 men.

=== Income ===
In 2023, the median household income was $171,766, with 4.4% of the population living in poverty.

According to a 2015 survey, the median household income was $126,762, and the median family income was $138,072. Men had a median income of $96,624 versus $68,709 for women. The per capita income for the area was $48,289. 2.8% of the population and 2.3% of families were below the poverty line.

== Arts and culture ==
Historic sites include Olney Ale House, Sandy Spring Museum, and Woodlawn Manor Living History Museum.

"Olney Days" is held annually each April, and included a parade and charity bike ride and walk.

Founded in 1938, the Olney Theatre is one of two state theaters in Maryland. It presents dramatic and musical live theatrical productions.

There is a branch of the Montgomery County Library in Olney.

Falling Green had been an active farm since 1764. A house and barn survive from the original farm. Falling Green house is a Georgian architecture house built in 1770 by a Quaker planter.

== Parks and recreation ==
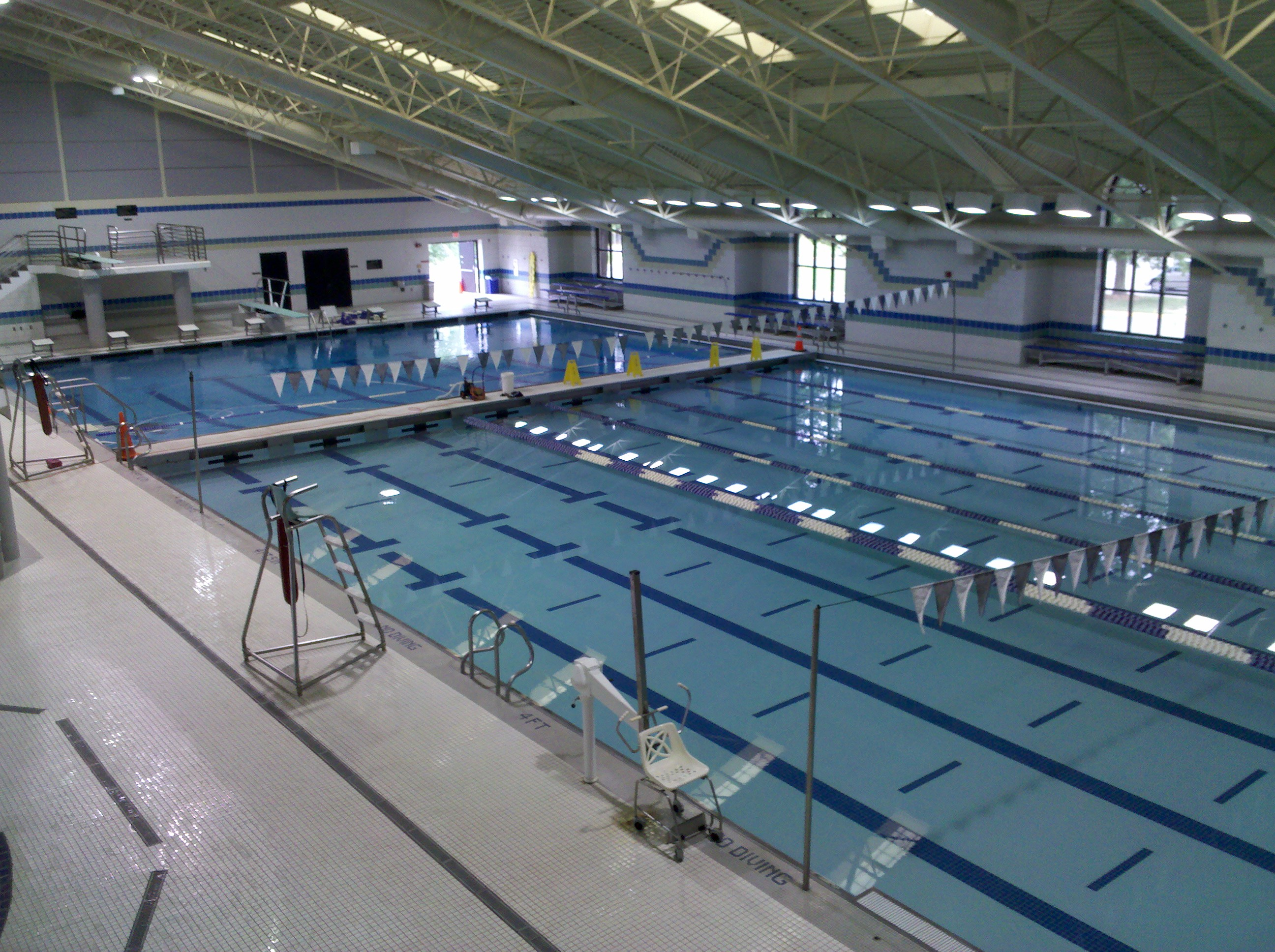
Olney's Graham S. Little Natatorium

Public parks include Olney Manor Park (which features the Olney Swim Center), Southeast Olney Park, Longwood Park, Cherrywood Park, Bowie Mill Park, and the OBGC Park at Freeman Fields.

Olney is also home to a private country club and a golf driving range, and the Norbeck Country Club.

== Education ==
There are three Montgomery County Public School clusters that trisect Olney, with some children attending elementary and middle schools that send students on to Sherwood High School and others attending schools that send students to Magruder High School or James Hubert Blake High School. The Our Lady of Good Counsel High School building opened in January 2007, enabling the Roman Catholic high school to relocate to Olney from Wheaton, Maryland. The new building of Washington Christian Academy opened in 2008 in Olney. Brooke Grove Elementary School, a public elementary school in Olney, was awarded in 1999 the Blue Ribbon School for Excellence. Cashell Elementary School was also selected as a 2014 National Blue Ribbon School. Other elementary schools serving Olney include Olney Elementary School, Belmont, and Sherwood. Middle schools include William Farquhar and Rosa Parks.

== Notable people ==
- Joe Aitcheson Jr., jockey in Racing Hall of Fame
- Hilda Counts, first woman to earn an electrical engineering degree from the University of Colorado
- Stefon Diggs, wide receiver for the Washington Commanders; attended Our Lady of Good Counsel in Olney
- Sidney A. Fitzwater, federal judge of the United States District Court for the Northern District of Texas
- Katie Feeney, social media personality and correspondent for the Washington Commanders
- Moira Geoffrion, sculptor
- Harold L. Ickes, U.S. Secretary of the Interior, bought the Headwaters Farm in 1937.
- Justin Maxwell, outfielder for the Washington Nationals and others
- Frank Miller, artist and film director
- Evan Vucci, photographer
- "Montana Jack" Ziegler, physician
- James Wood, baseball player for the Washington Nationals

== In popular culture ==
Olney appears in the 2008 video game Fallout 3, where it is referred to as Old Olney and depicted as a rundown, derelict town inhabited by Deathclaws.
