= Sandy Spring, Maryland =

Unincorporated community in Maryland, United States

Sandy Spring
- Location in the U.S. state of Maryland
- Coordinates: 39°08′58.3″N 77°01′34.42″W
- Country: United States of America
- State: Maryland
- County: Montgomery
- Settled: ca. 1715
- Time zone: UTC-5 (EST)
  - Summer (DST): UTC-4 (EDT)
- ZIP code: 20860
- Area codes: 301, 240

Sandy Spring is an unincorporated community in Montgomery County, Maryland, United States.

== Geography ==
Sandy Spring's boundaries are roughly defined as Brooke Road and Dr. Bird Road to the north and west, Ednor Road to the south, and New Hampshire Avenue to the east.

The United States Census Bureau combines Sandy Spring with the nearby community of Ashton to form the census-designated place of Ashton-Sandy Spring, and all census data are tabulated for this combined entity.

== History ==
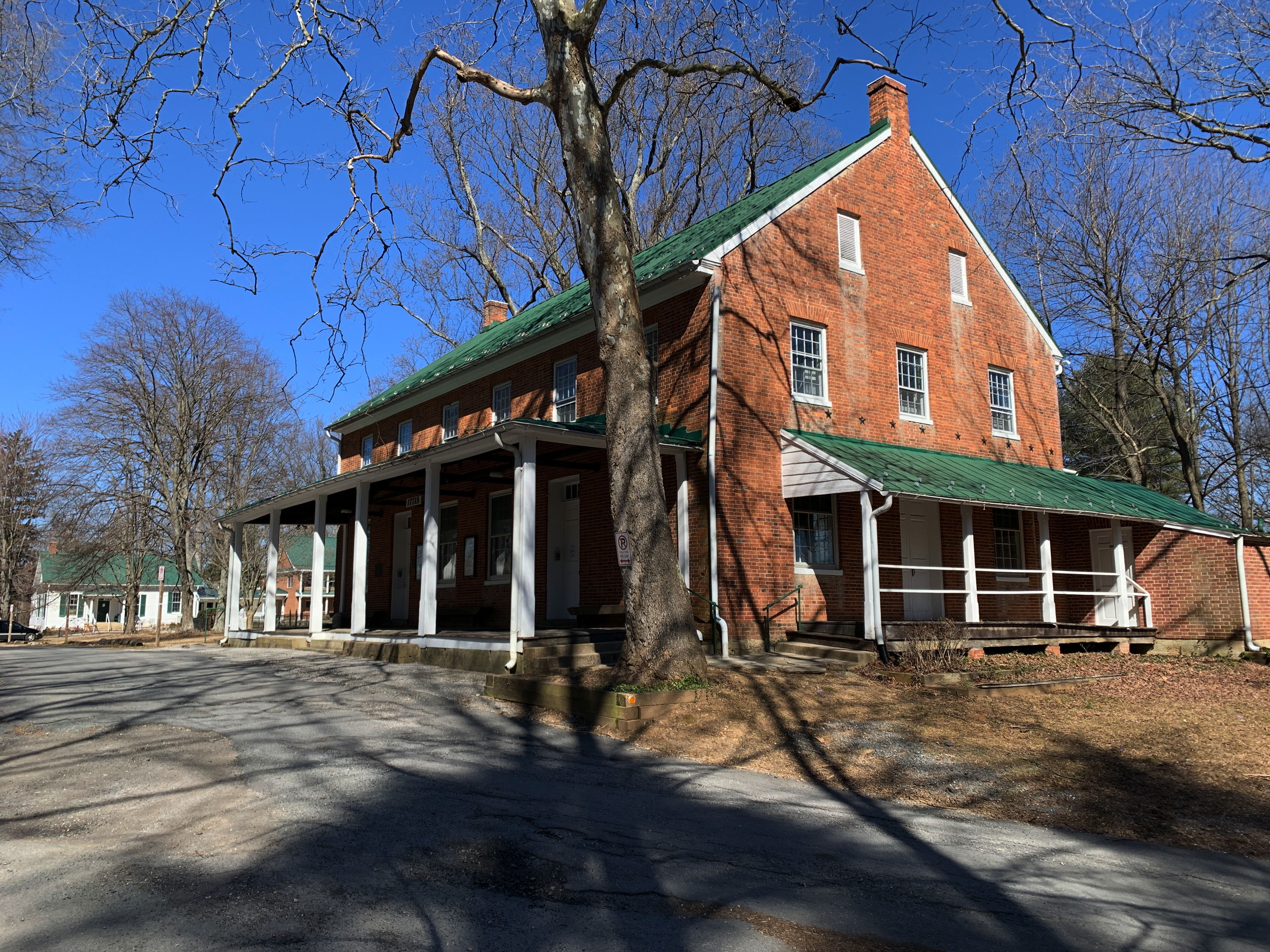
Sandy Spring Friends Meeting House

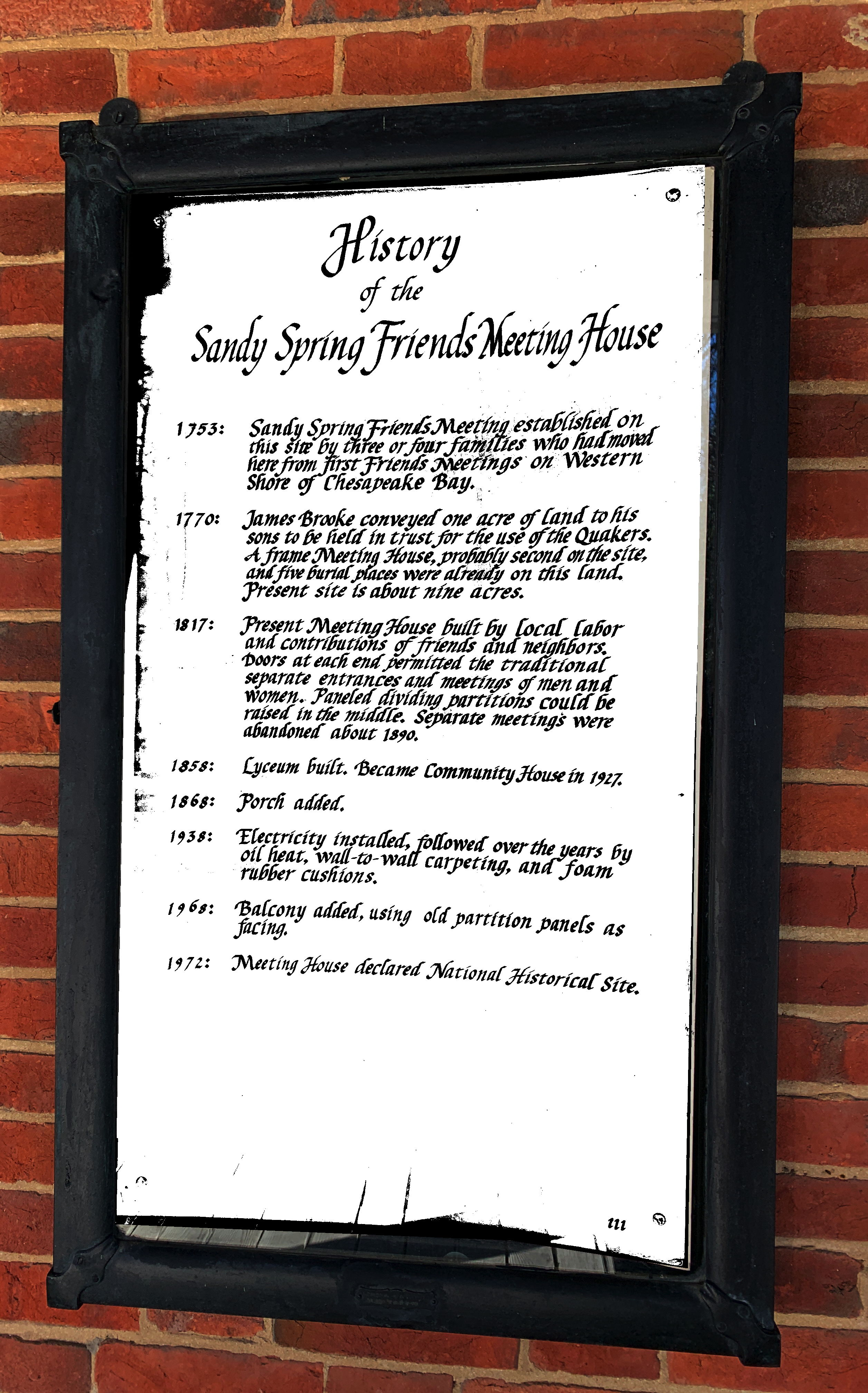
Chronology of the Sandy Spring Friends Meeting House

The community was founded by Quakers who arrived in the early 18th century searching for land where they could grow tobacco and corn. One of the very early land owners in the Sandy Spring area was Richard Snowden, who patented (purchased) the 1,000 acres (4 km^{2}) "Snowden's Manor" in 1715. Snowden gradually enlarged his property with additional land purchases over the next few decades until it was surveyed at over 9,000 acres (36 km^{2}) as "Snowden's Manor Enlarged" in 1743.

Another important early landowner, Major John Bradford, had patented over 2,000 acres (8 km^{2}) in the Sandy Spring area, including "Charley Forest" in 1716, "Charley Forest Enlarged", "Higham", and "Discovery." Bradford sold off large parts of these properties, but Snowden's son-in-law, James Brooke, later bought up the original Charley Forest land as well as other land in the area, eventually owning over 22,000 acres (90 km^{2}) by the 1760s.

The Quakers built their current brick meeting house in 1817, replacing a 1770 frame meeting house. Quakers first began worshiping in the area circa 1753. The site is near a fresh-water spring that gave its name to the community. The location of this meeting house in the village of Sandy Spring helped to define the geographic extent of the greater Sandy Spring neighborhood of the time, comprising those areas from which members of the Meeting could travel to and from the meeting house by horse or carriage in one day, arriving home before sunset. The greater Sandy Spring neighborhood thus includes the current communities of Brookeville, Olney, Norbeck, Ednor, Brighton, and other communities within a six-mile radius of the meeting house.

Founded in 1822, Sharp Street Church was the first African-American congregation in Montgomery County. The Quaker church prohibited its members from owning slaves in the 1770s, and Sandy Spring was home to many Quakers. The local Quakers freed their enslaved people, and they donated land and money to build and support the Sharp Street Church. Sharp Street Church was named after Sharp Street Church in Baltimore, often considered the mother church of Black Methodism in the United States. When Sandy Spring's Sharp Street Church started the first school for Black children in the county around 1864, Quaker teachers from the nearby Friends School served as its teachers. The original log cabin structure was replaced by a frame building in 1886. The church burned in 1920, and it was replaced by a new structure in 1923.

In the late 19th century the community started a local school called the Sherwood Academy. This school was turned over to the Government of Montgomery County in 1906 to become Sherwood High School, the county's third public high school. A Quaker school, Sandy Spring Friends School, was established in 1961. In 1967 a Quaker retirement community, Friends House, was founded next to the school.

The Sandy Spring Library opened behind the Sandy Spring Store in 1842. The Farmer's Club of Sandy Spring was established in 1844 to discuss preferable methods of farming.

A 1901 Department of Labor study documented hundreds of residents who trace their lineage 125 years to free black families.

=== Sandy Spring Museum ===
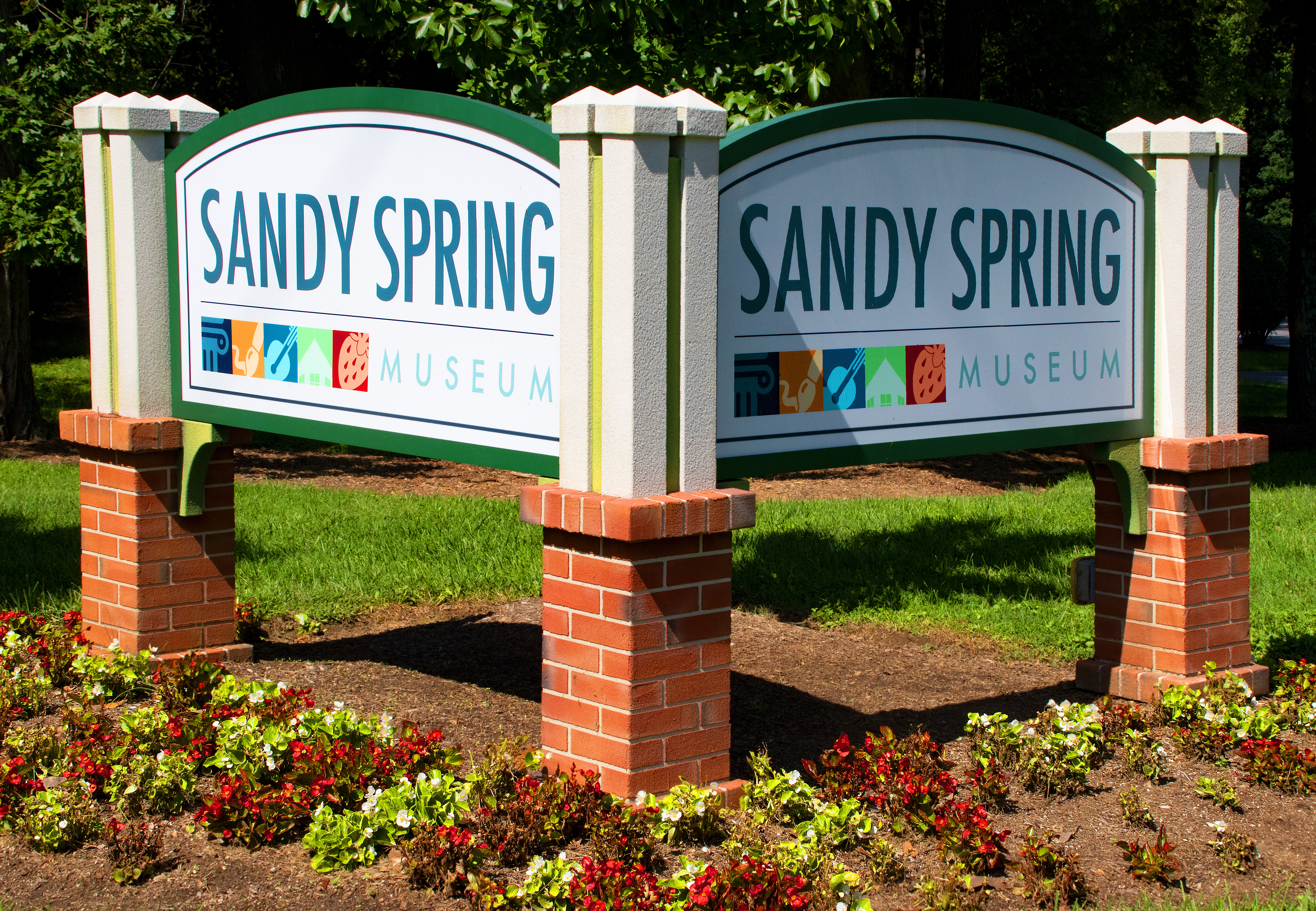
The sign for the Sandy Spring Museum in Sandy Spring, Maryland as photographed in September 2020.

An insurance salesman and auctioneer named Delmas Wood started the Sandy Spring Museum in 1980 because he thought Sandy Spring's history was gradually being lost as older residents died. Wood wanted a place to preserve antique furniture, farm equipment, photographs, paintings, and documents of the Sandy Spring area. Florence Virginia Barrett Lehman also helped found the museum.

The museum was originally located in the basement of a Sandy Spring National Bank branch in Olney. In October 1986, it moved to Tall Timbers, a brick four-story Colonial house that had been the home of Gladys Brooke Tumbleson, who had died earlier that year. Tumbleson descended from the Brooke family, for which nearby Brookeville was named. Tumbleson sold the building to the museum for less than market value.

Helen Bentley donated 7.5 acres (30,000 m^{2}) of land on Bentley Road in Sandy Spring to the museum in 1994. The museum's new building on opened in 1997, providing more room for the museum's exhibits.

In 2007, an addition opened, providing a research library and a collections storage facility for the museum.

== Notable residents ==
- Dr. Jacob Wheeler Bird, medical doctor and founder of Montgomery General Hospital
- Benjamin Hallowell, prominent teacher
