= Baltimore Design School =

Middle-high school in Baltimore, Maryland

- High school entrance (September 2026)

Location
- 1500 Barclay Street; Baltimore, Maryland 21202; United States; 39°18′25.99″N 76°36′39.82″W

Information
- School type: Charter
- Founded: 2013
- School district: Baltimore City Public Schools
- School number: 382
- Principal: Darrin Brozene
- Grades: 6-12
- Enrollment: 516 (2018)
- Area: 115,000 sq ft
- Campus type: Urban
- Website: Official website

Baltimore Design School is a public charter middle/high school located in Baltimore, Maryland, United States. The school occupies the former Lebow Brothers Clothing Factory in the Greenmount West neighborhood, part of the Station North Arts and Entertainment District. The school was modeled on, and intended to complement, the Baltimore School for the Arts, which focuses on the performing arts. By contrast, Baltimore Design School's stated aim is to provide its students with "a solid foundation of design and studio skills followed by intensive academics and design study", by completion of four years of study in one of three tracks in architecture-construction design and management, graphic design-interactive media production, or fashion design, followed by three years of CTE training.

== History ==
The industrial building that would eventually become the Baltimore Design School was built between 1915 and 1916 as part of the Crown Cork & Seal Co. which at the time produced nearly half the worlds supply of metal bottle caps (invented in Baltimore); the building was one of the finest machine shops in the country, producing nearly all the production machinery for Crown's plants worldwide. After Crown Cork left Baltimore in 1958, it passed into the hands of the Lebow Brothers Clothing factory, which occupied the site until 1985, when the building was closed during a labor dispute. After that, the building sat vacant for nearly 30 years. Portions of the abandoned factory were used for scenes in the fourth season of The Wire. The redevelopment was a product of a public-private partnership between Seawall Development Co., Baltimore City Public Schools and the school organization.
