= Crown Cork & Seal Company (Baltimore) =

American company

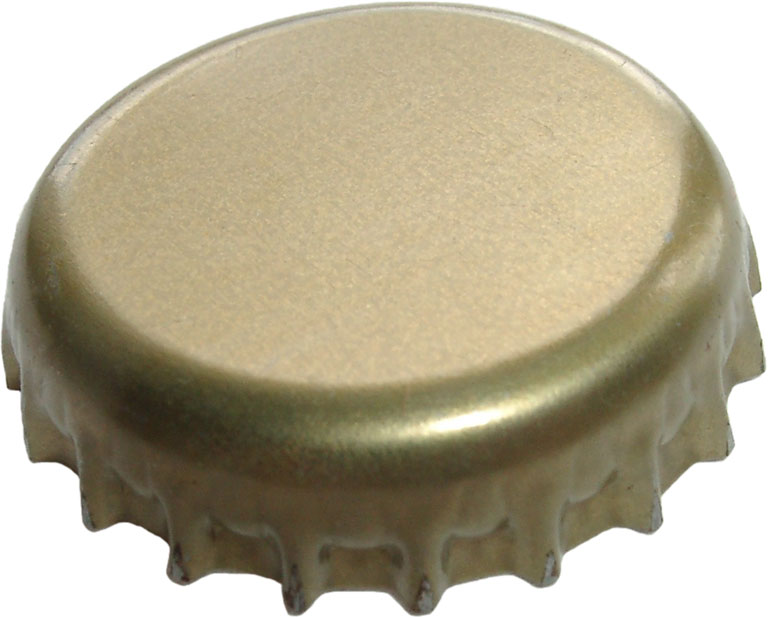
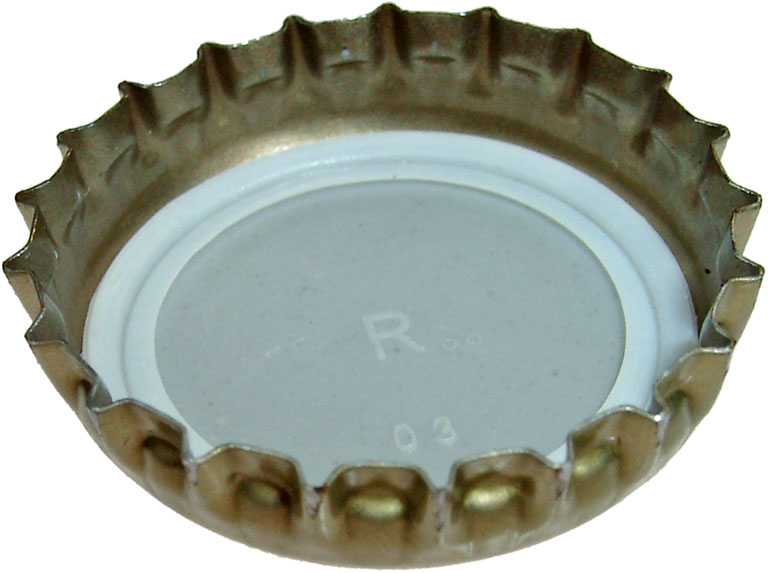
The "crown cork" disposable metal bottle cap was invented and manufactured in Baltimore by the billions.

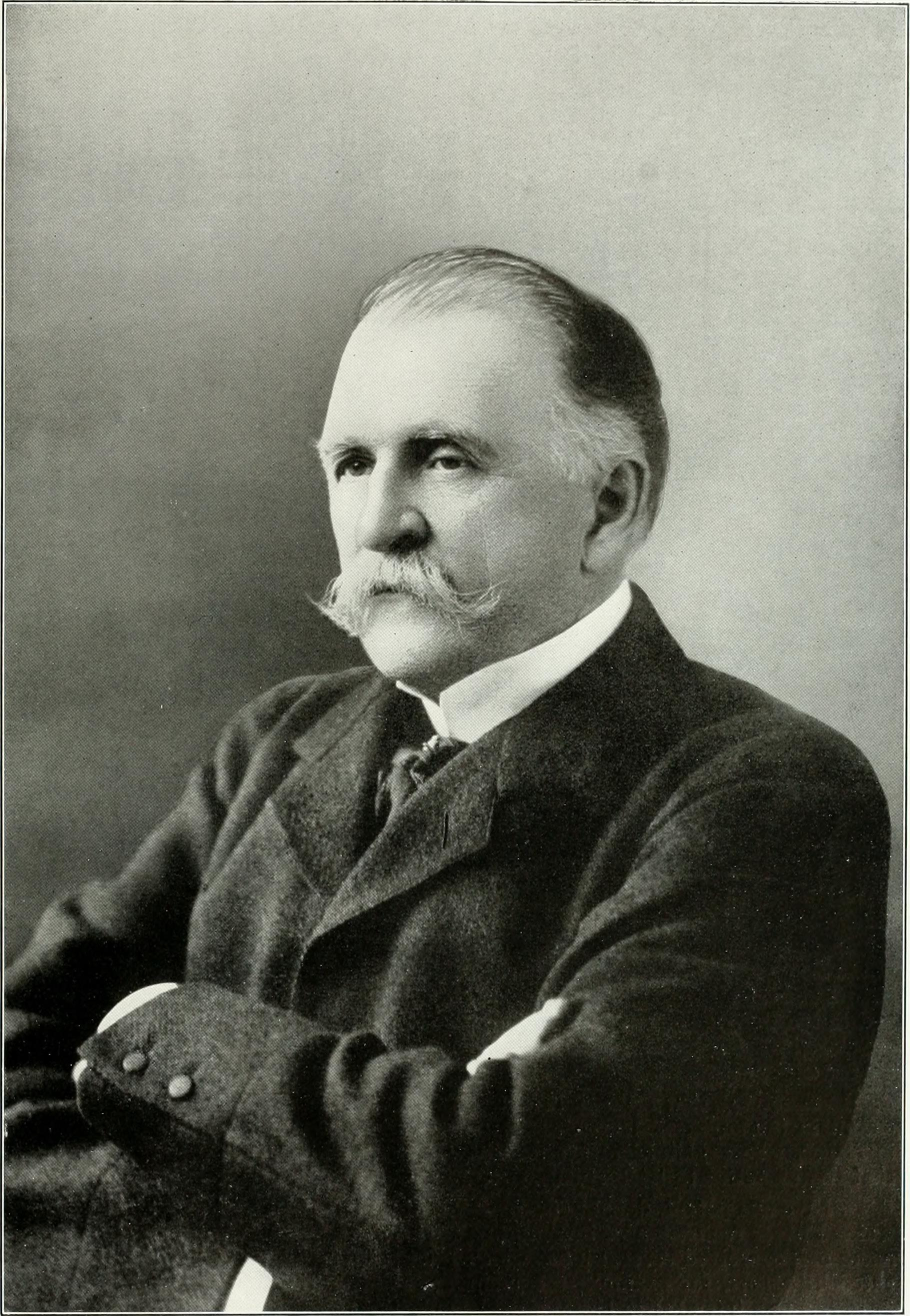
Painter (1896)

The Crown Cork & Seal Company was founded in Baltimore, Maryland, in 1892, for the purpose of manufacturing metal bottle caps (the "crown cork"), a technology invented in Baltimore. The invention was so successful that by 1920 the company supplied half the world's bottle caps at the rate of millions and eventually billions per year. The Crown Cork factory was one of the largest manufacturing concerns in the United States, a sprawling city within a city. The 66-year Baltimore period, from the invention in 1892 to 1958, was a significant part of the city's cultural, technological, and industrial history. The company reorganized, diversified and moved the headquarters to Philadelphia in 1958. Many of the old factory buildings in Baltimore have been rehabilitated as artist studios, small businesses, and schools.

In time, the Crown Cork & Seal Company evolved into Crown Holdings, Inc., an American multinational packaging company headquartered in Tampa, Florida, that designs and manufactures rigid-metal packaging including aluminum beverage cans, metal food cans, aerosol cans, and specialty packaging.

== Background ==
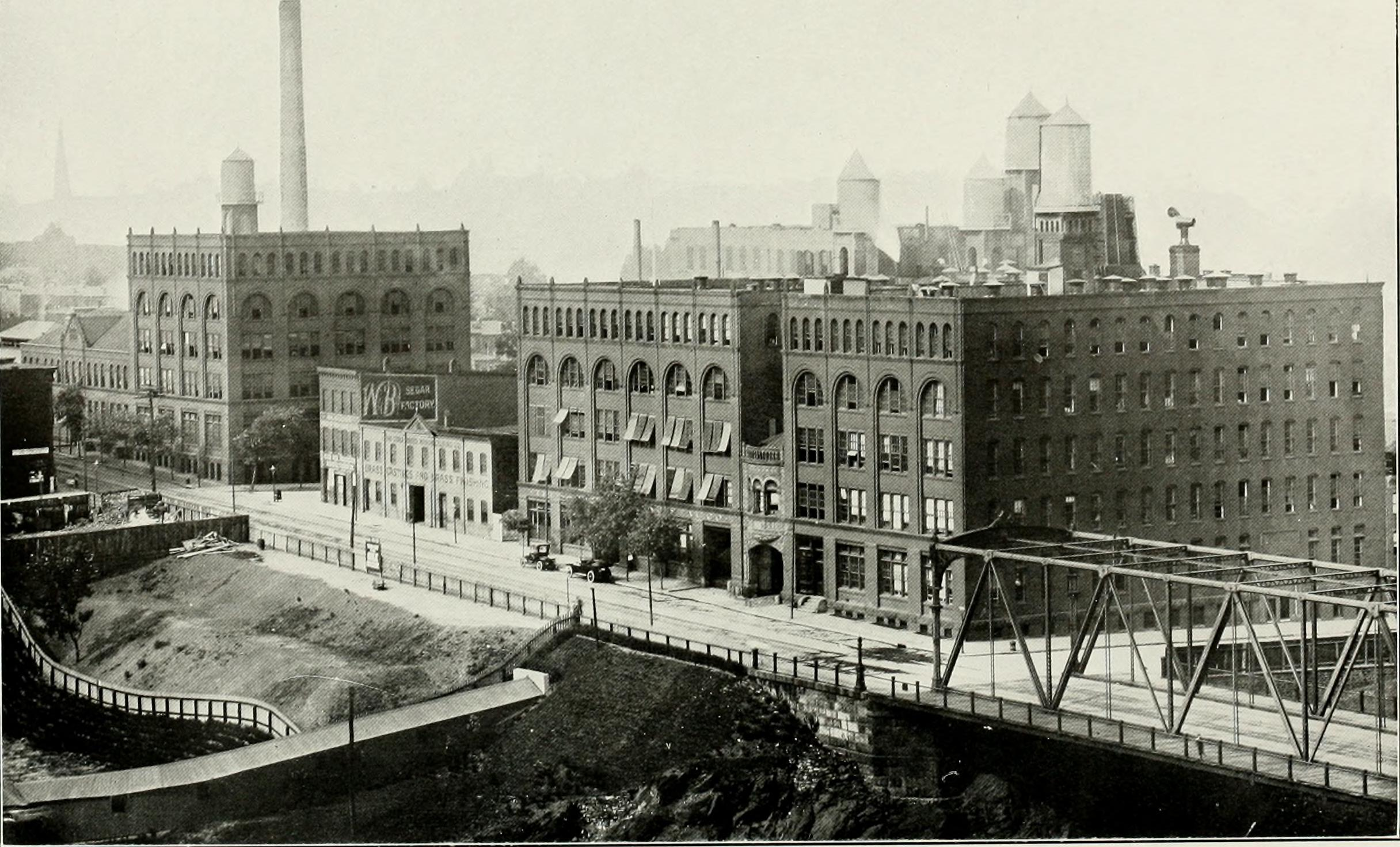
The Guilford Ave. complex were the company's first dedicated buildings, and within a year already too small.

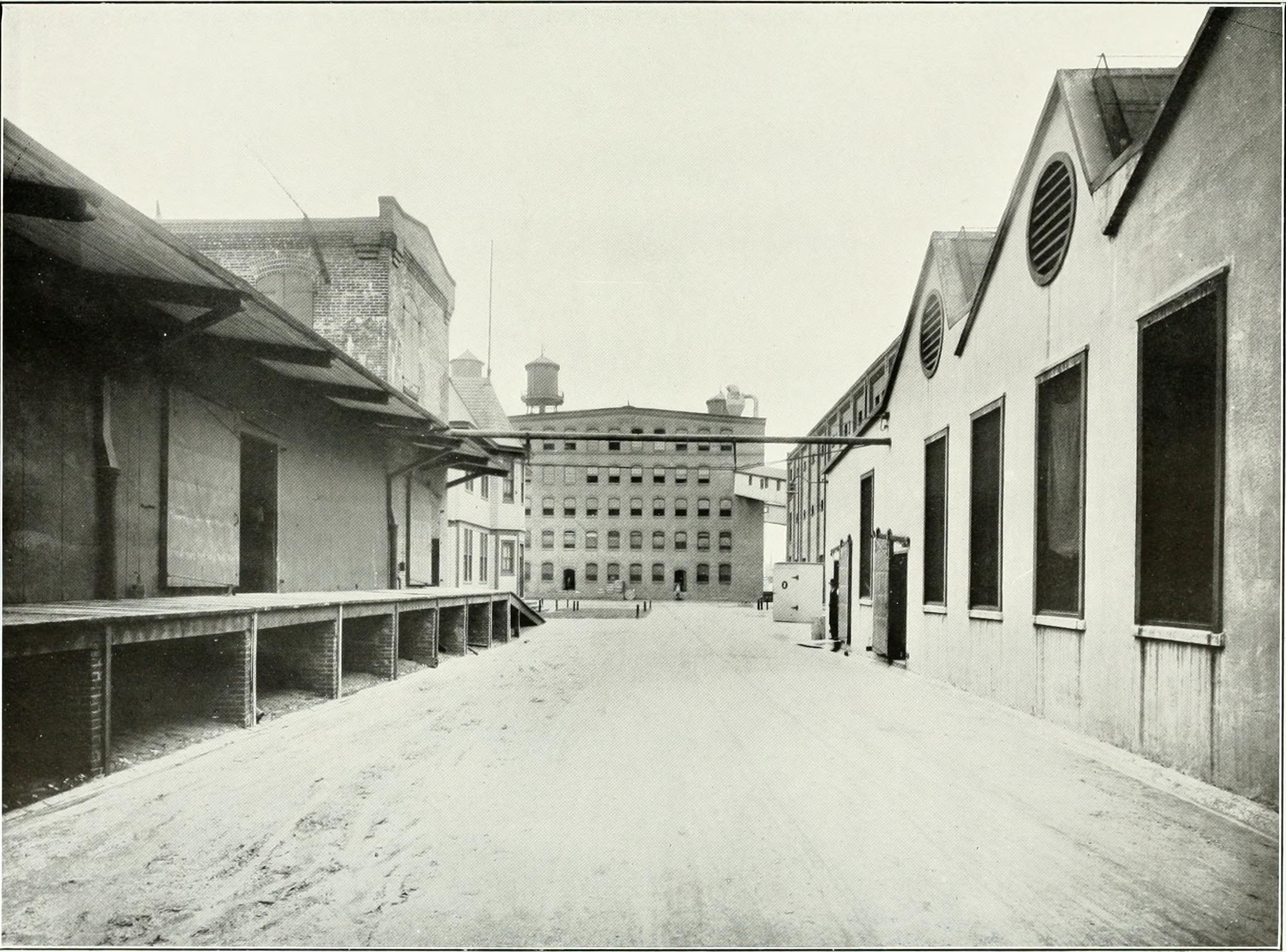
Highlandtown entrance, a "city within a city"

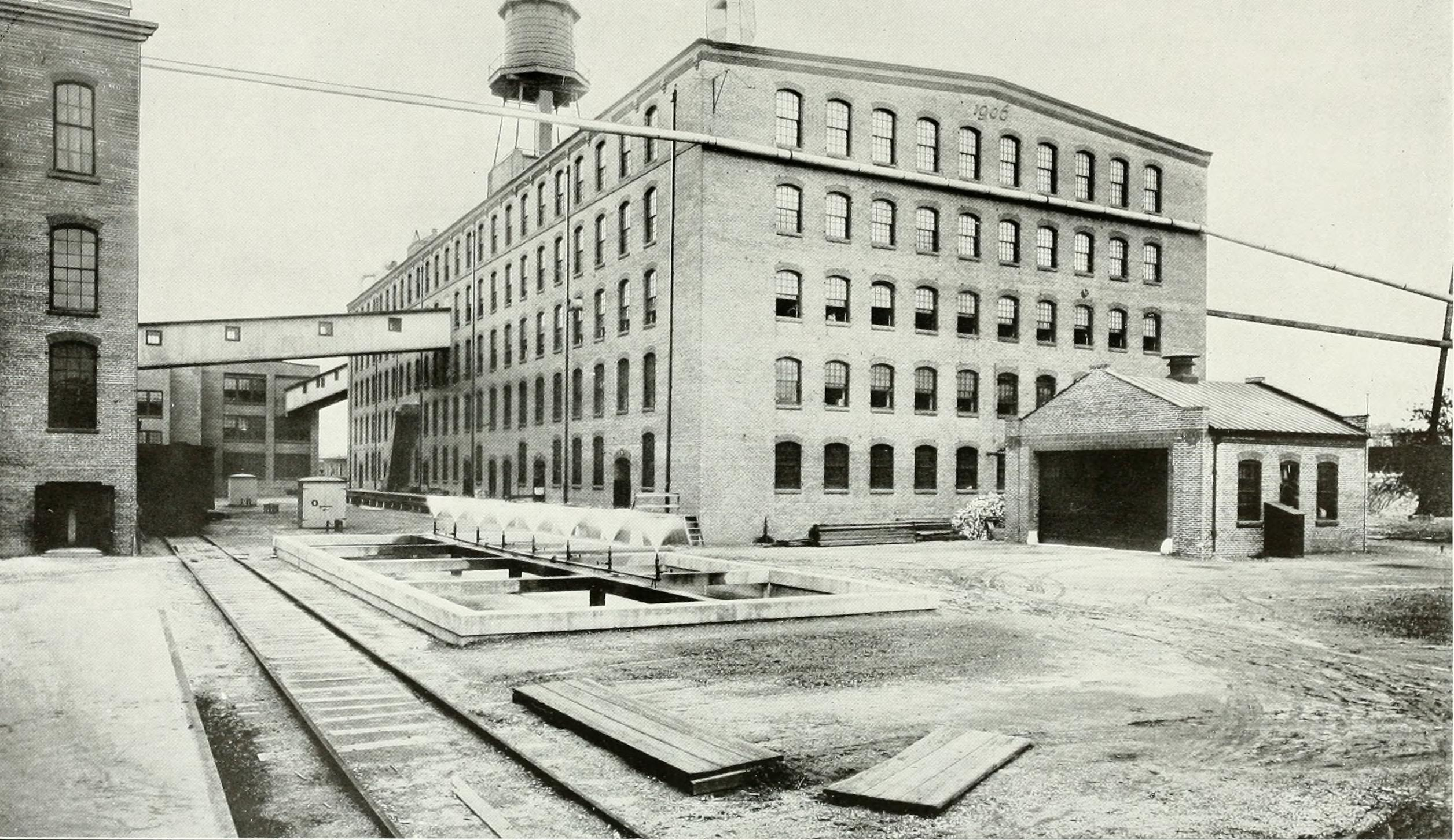
Highlandtown complex was one of the largest manufacturing plants in the United States.

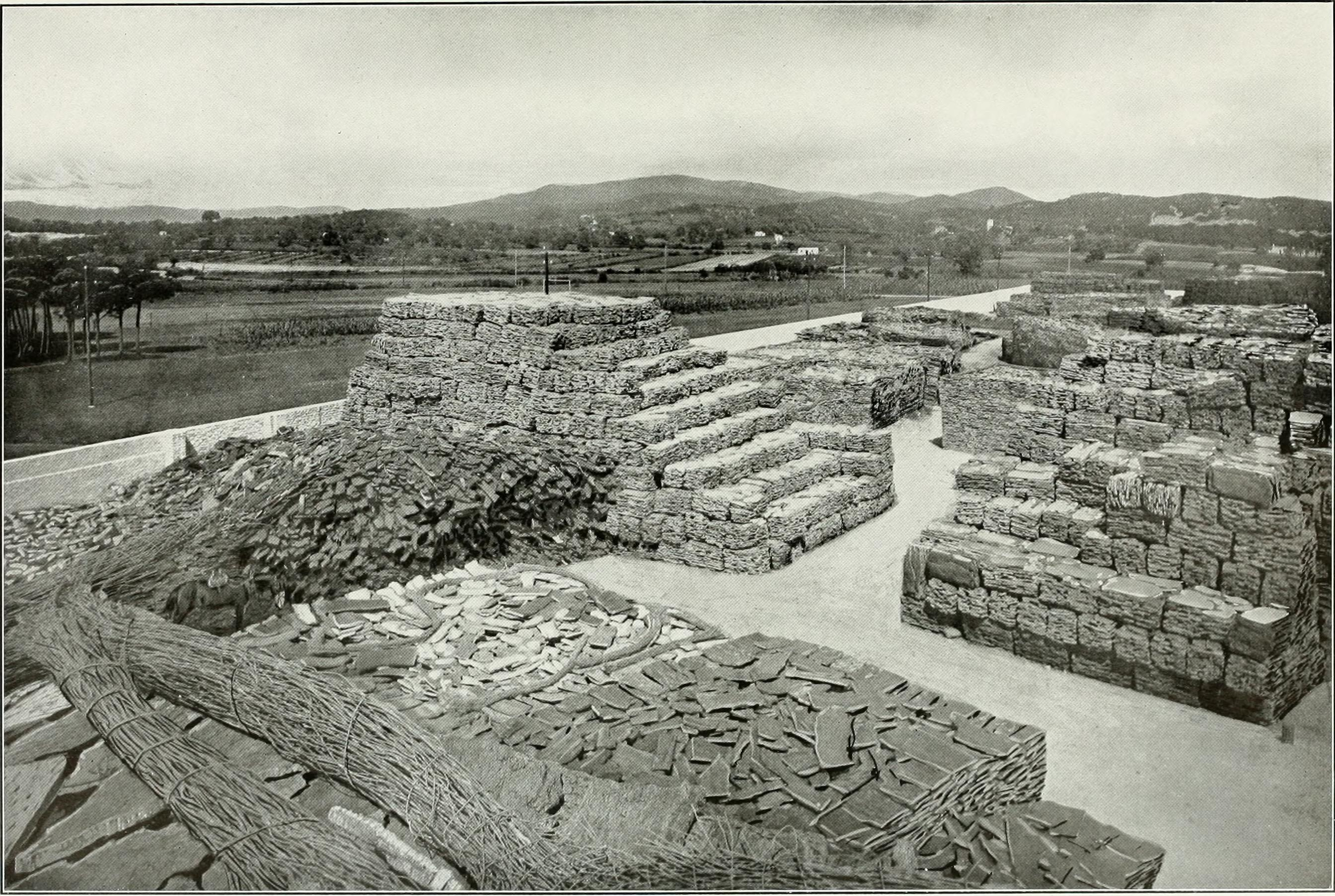
Valuable cork-wood depot in Spain, this pile was over 1 million dollars in 1914.

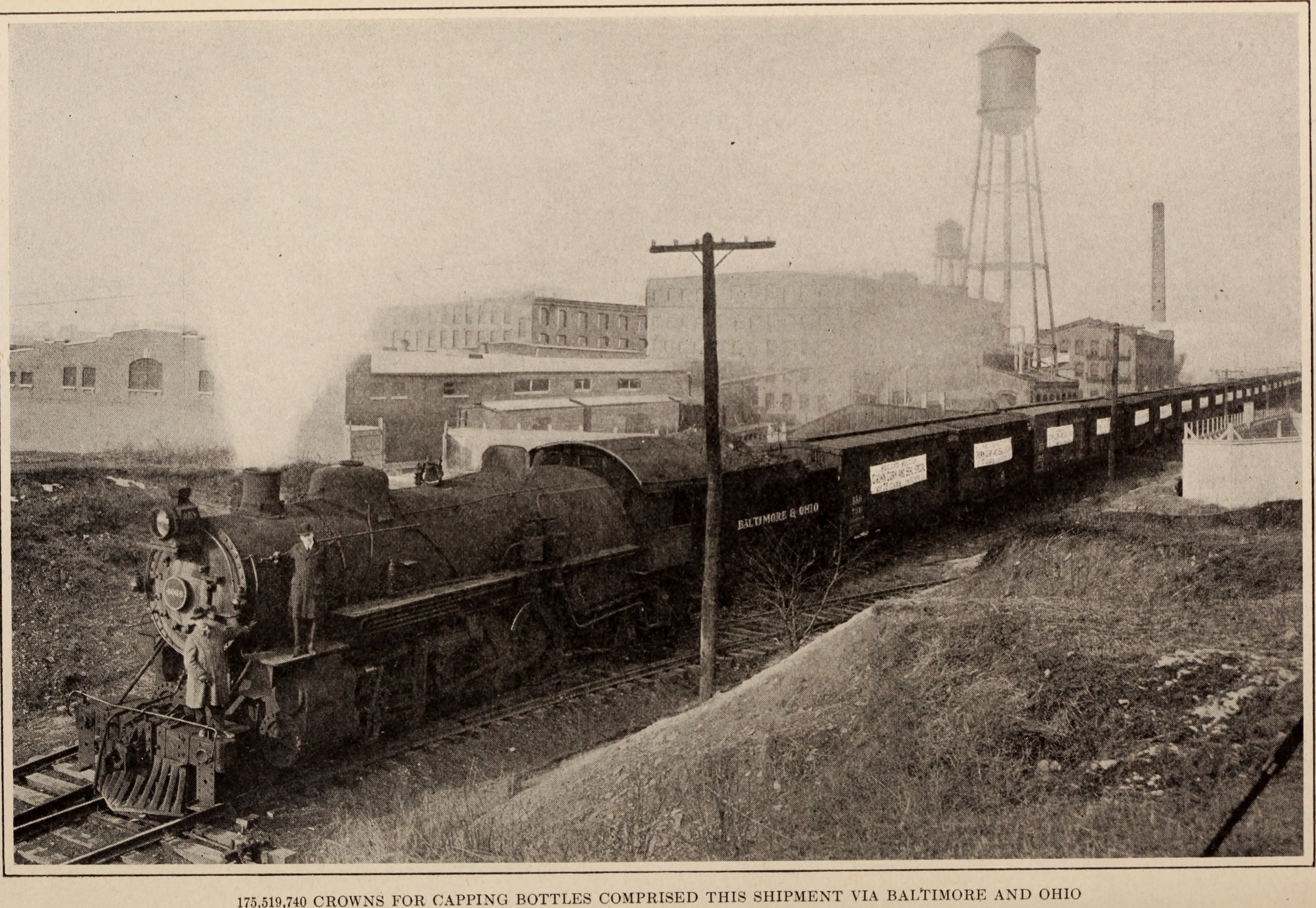
A record-breaking 175 million bottle caps leave the Highlandtown factory for points west on the B&O railroad (1916). By 1930 they were producing over 100 million per day.

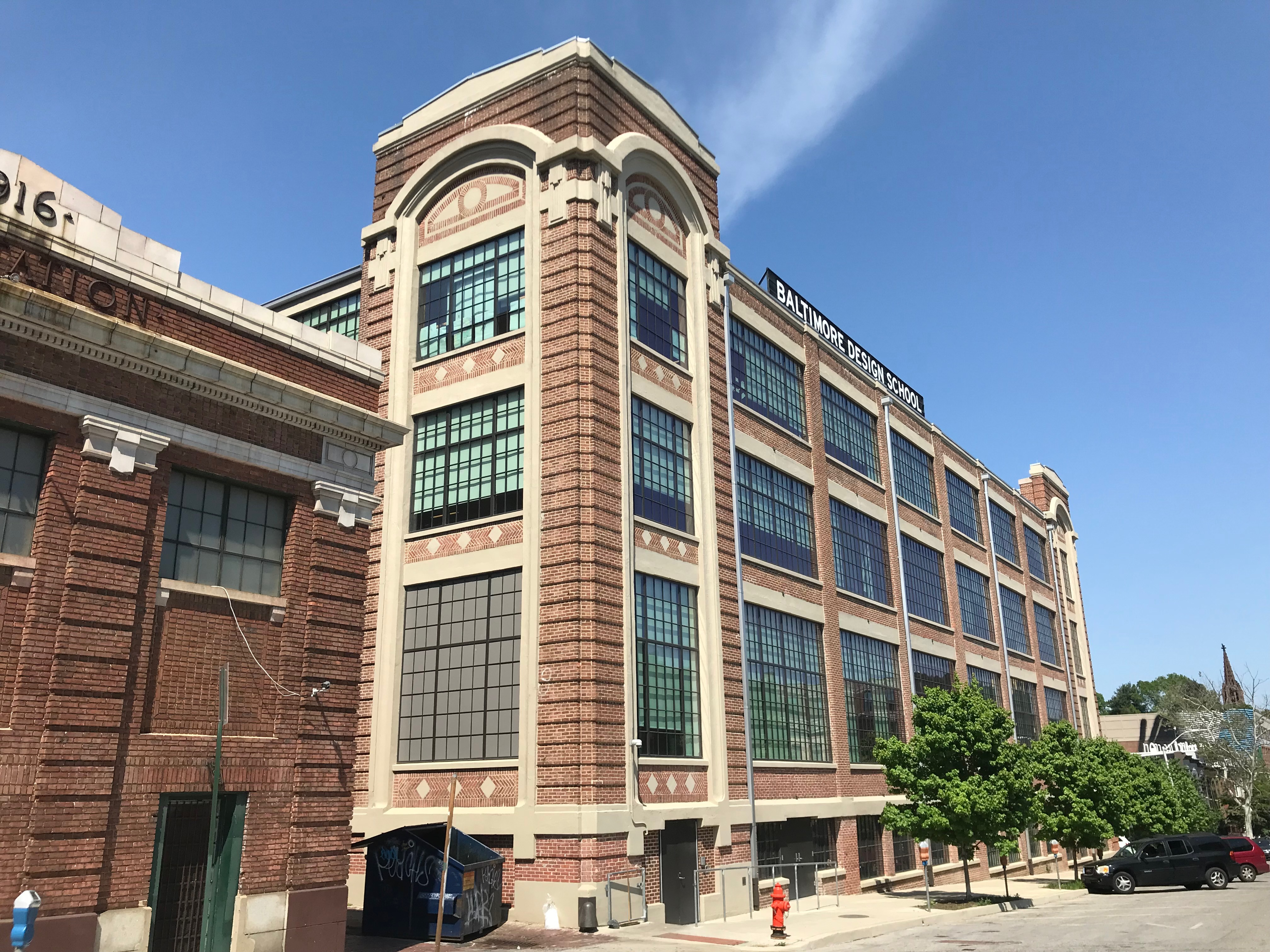
The Machinery Works on Barclay St. is now the Baltimore Design School (high school)

The founder of Crown Cork & Seal was William Painter who was born in 1838 in Tridelphia, Maryland to a Quaker family. Described as an "irrepressible tinkerpreneur," he had no higher education but had the drive to "make something." In 1855, at the age of seventeen, he began an apprenticeship at a patent leather manufacturing shop in Wilmington, Delaware, where his first invention, a machine for softening leather, was reportedly stolen by his foreman. This experience taught Painter about the importance of obtaining intellectual property rights. Over his lifetime, Painter filed about 85 patents including a paper-folding machine, a counterfeit coin detector, and a safety ejection seat for passenger trains.

In the late 19th century, the market for bottled beverages like beer and soda was growing, but sealing carbonated drinks was a problem. Existing stoppers were a mix of cork, glass, wire, and rubber contraptions. They were often expensive, unsanitary, and unreliable. Corks could dry out and shrink, causing leaks, while other stoppers were difficult to clean and could affect the taste. By the 1880s, the U.S. Patent Office had approved an estimated 1,500 different bottle stopper patents. While working as a foreman at Baltimore's Murrill & Keizer machine shop, Painter became preoccupied with the bottle stopper challenge. In 1885, he patented two stoppers: the "Triumph," a wire-retaining stopper, and the "Bottle Seal" (also known as the "Baltimore loop seal"). The Bottle Seal was a simple, flat rubber disk that fit into a groove inside the bottle's mouth, forming an "inverted arch" that resisted internal pressure. It was cheap enough to be disposable, selling for just twenty-five cents per gross, a fraction of the cost of reusable stoppers. To manufacture it, Painter and his business partner Samuel Cook formed the Bottle Seal Company.

== The crown cork ==
Despite the success of the Bottle Seal, William Painter was not satisfied. His idea was to invent something "which everybody needs, better and more cheaply provided than ever before." Between 1888 and 1891 he experimented with a new idea: a metal, corrugated cap internally lined with a thin cork disk that would seal the top of the bottle, "crowning" its mouth. This approach eliminated any contact between the metal cap and the beverage, ensuring sanitation, and created a gas-tight seal perfect for carbonated drinks. The thin cork liner provided the seal, while the tin cap held it in place with a series of crimped "flutes" or corrugations that locked under the bottle's head.

Painter understood the cap's advantage as a small, cheap and most importantly a disposable product. It guaranteed never-ending sales, a very low cost to manufacture, and no ongoing stopper maintenance (collecting, cleaning, repairing). In his patent application, he noted that he had devised "metallic sealing-caps... so inexpensive as to warrant throwing them away after a single use." This concept was unusual in an era accustomed to reuse. On February 2, 1892, Painter was granted three patents for his new system: one for the cap itself, one for the sealing disk's composition, and one for the use of cork and other materials. The family dubbed the invention the "crown cap," and Painter's son Orrin drew the company's crown logo. One editor marveled that the invention "crowned one of the most troublesome inventive problems with a success which is simply dazzling."

== Early years: 1892–1897 ==
With the patent secured, the Crown Cork & Seal Company was incorporated in Baltimore on April 1, 1893, acquiring the rights to both the Bottle Seal and the new Crown Cork. The company began operations at the Bottle Seal Company's small factory at 500-506 East Monument Street. The initial reception from brewers and bottlers was chilly; many were skeptical that a small metal cap with a "tiny sliver of cork" could contain the pressure of their products. To prove its effectiveness, Painter convinced a Baltimore brewer to ship cases of crown-capped beer as ballast on a round-trip journey to South America. After forty days at sea, the beer returned perfectly preserved and carbonated, a "frothy success" that won over the industry.

Painter's inventions went beyond the cap itself; he recognized that a new closure required a new system of bottling. He told his son that the mechanisms he devised for applying the Crown Cork "had cost him more mental effort than the invention of the Crown itself." The company had to sell glass manufacturers on making bottles with a new "crown finish" — a uniform, specially shaped lip that the cap could grip securely. This required a level of precision that was a new challenge for the glass industry. To meet the needs of bottlers, Painter designed a suite of machinery. Crown Cork & Seal became the sole provider of an integrated system, manufacturing the caps, the machines to apply them, and the equipment to carbonate, blend, and fill the bottles. The company's works produced seven different kinds of filling and stoppering machines, the largest of which was the "Jumbo," an automatic power machine capable of capping 100 bottles a minute, hailed as "the most rapid and perfect machine in the history of bottling."

The company grew rapidly, supported by a sales force that included King C. Gillette, who would later invent the disposable safety razor. Gillette had joined the Baltimore Seal Company in 1891 and developed a close friendship with Painter, who advised him, "King, you are always thinking and inventing something. Why don't you try to think of something like the Crown Cork which, when once used, is thrown away, and the customer keeps coming back for more?" This advice on the value of a disposable product would profoundly influence Gillette's own future success. As demand soared, the company quickly outgrew its Monument Street facility.

== Expansion and crisis: 1897-1927 ==
In May 1897, Crown Cork & Seal moved to a factory complex on the 1500 block of Guilford Avenue (then known as York Street). The pace of growth was so fast that the new factory was almost immediately insufficient to meet demand. A December 1898 article in The Baltimore Sun reported that the plant, which had been occupied for just over a year, "already proved too small," necessitating the construction of an adjacent six-story building. The resulting complex was "one of the largest manufacturing plants in the South." By the end of 1897, the new factory was producing nearly 280 million bottle caps annually — "very close to a million pieces for every actual working day in the year."

To keep up with demand that constantly threatened to outstrip production capacity, the company adopted new industrial technology. It was one of the first manufacturers in Baltimore to purchase electricity from the city's new power plants, which allowed the factory to operate twenty-four hours per day and "meet the growing national demand for their closures." Around 1906, having outgrown the Guilford Avenue complex, the company began relocating its primary manufacturing to a new, seventeen-acre site on Eastern Avenue in Highlandtown. William Painter died in July 1906, having lived long enough to see his invention become well established and leaving the company he founded at the height of its power, although in the hands of less capable family management.

After Painter's death, the company entered a period of decline. The business "almost ran into the ground" under the management of one of his sons-in-law. The expiration of Painter's original patents in 1909 opened the company to competition. Even worse, Prohibition in 1920 eliminated in a single day the entire market for beer bottle caps. The company responded by shifting to the growing soft drink industry, but it was a weak substitute. By the later 1920s, profits were underperforming, and the company "seemed to be sinking".

== McManus era: 1928–1946 ==
The company began a new life under Charles E. McManus, a Baltimore native. McManus founded the New Process Cork Company in 1912, perfecting "composition cork," a material made from cork granules and a binder. It was cheaper and more effective than pure natural cork for sealing bottles. In the early 1920s, while on a commercial flight to Cuba, he happened to be seated next to the husband of Painter's granddaughter, who confided in him about the family company troubles. That chance encounter proved to be the catalyst. A few years later, in 1927, McManus orchestrated a reverse takeover that "astonished the crown industry," as his smaller, more innovative company acquired the floundering Crown Cork & Seal. He kept the more famous name and consolidated all manufacturing at the massive Highlandtown plant, which he then proceeded to transform into an industrial city within a city.

Under McManus, the company entered its greatest period of expansion. The seventeen-acre complex was described as "the largest manufacturing plant of its kind in the world," a fully integrated facility that created "everything necessary for making bottle caps — the tin, and the litho press for colorful brands — everything except the cork, which arrived by rail from the harbor." McManus invested millions in modernizing and expanding the plant, adding new buildings and machinery. He developed a "breaker room" with machinery for granulating cork slabs and pressing them into composition cork. Another building had machines for slicing the cork cylinders into the small disks used in the caps. The company diversified beyond bottle caps, adding automotive parts like cork gaskets and sun visors, as well as materials for railroads and the shoe industry.

McManus transformed the company into a leader in metal fabrication and machinery. In 1935, he installed a five-stand tandem cold-reducing steel mill at the plant to produce the company's own steel for caps and closures. He later pioneered electrolytic tinning lines, a process that conserved tin and was licensed to major steel companies. The company's Machinery Works on Barclay and Oliver Street (now the Baltimore Design School) was one of the finest machine shops in the country, producing nearly all the production machinery for Crown's plants worldwide. In 1936, McManus entered the can-making business, founding the Crown Can Company. During World War II, the Baltimore plant became a defense contractor, producing gun mounts, aircraft sub-assemblies, and gas mask canisters. At its peak, the Highlandtown plant employed 5,000 people and produced around 40 billion bottle caps annually.

== Global expansion ==
Crown Cork & Seal's global expansion began almost immediately after it was founded, under the leadership of William Painter's business partner, Samuel G. B. Cook. In 1889, Cook traveled to London. He first formed The Bottle Seal Company, Ltd. of England to sell the Bottle Seal. He established the first European factory for the Bottle Seal in Hamburg, Germany. With the success of the Crown Cork, Cook organized The Crown Cork Company, Limited, in London in May 1897. It was the global headquarters for all business outside of the United States and Canada. It opened factories in London, Paris, Hamburg, Yokohama, Japan, and Rio de Janeiro. By 1914, the company also operated a manufacturing plant in Toronto, with distributing depots in Montreal and Winnipeg, and another plant in Mexico City.

Under the leadership of Charles E. McManus, the company's international presence was consolidated and expanded. In 1928, he organized the Crown Cork International Corporation to oversee the foreign subsidiaries, which at the time included plants in Canada, England, France, Brazil, and Spain. Soon after, the company acquired additional plants in Belgium, Holland, South Africa, Portugal, and Algeria. The company also controlled its raw material supply chain through its subsidiary, the Corchera International, located in Palamós, Spain. This firm processed corkwood for the cork disks and operated collecting depots in Spain, Portugal, and Algeria to receive raw cork from the region's forests.

== Final years: 1946-1958 ==
After McManus's death in 1946, his sons took over, yet once again the leadership faltered. By 1957, Crown Cork & Seal was at risk of imminent insolvency, an echo of the problems 30 years earlier. A new president, John F. Connelly, was brought in to restructure the company. He implemented immediate emergency cost-cutting measures such as stopping all production and firing many staff. Most significantly he moved the corporate headquarters from Baltimore to Philadelphia to be closer to the company's can-making operations.

== Legacy: 1958-present ==
Crown Cork & Seal continued to use the Highland plant for making cans and bottle caps until 1983, after which it was phased out of commission finally closing in 1987. Parts of the massive complex sat derelict for decades and have since been demolished, particularly on the southern end. In the 1980s, the remaining buildings were renamed Crown Industrial Park and leased to small businesses and artist studios, including machine shops and coffee roasters. In 2024 the state of Maryland acquired the property, and in February 2025 Cross Street Partners, a local real-estate development firm headed by Bill Struever, who has renovated many historic sites in Baltimore, purchased it from the state for future redevelopment into artist studios, business, and retail spaces.

The complex on the 1500 and 1600 blocks of Guilford Avenue, located in what is now the Station North Arts and Entertainment District, has survived. After the company vacated the buildings, they were eventually converted into artists' live/work studios. Known today as the Crown Cork and Seal Building or, more commonly, the Copycat Building (after the last tenant), the complex provides studio space for hundreds of artists and has been part of the city's arts scene for decades. The former Crown Cork & Seal Machinery Works on Barclay Street, next to 1500 Guilford Ave, built between 1915 and 1916, was later leased to various businesses and then sat vacant for 30 years. In 2013, it was rehabilitated and is now home to the Baltimore Design School, a public middle-high school.

The company operated a Machinery Division located in an industrial park in East Baltimore, completely separate from the historic Highlandtown and Barclay Street locations. This modern facility was located at 1200 E. 22nd Street, in the Northwood Industrial Park; it was the company's primary center for designing and manufacturing high-speed bottling and canning machinery. This division was finally shut down in 2007, ending the company's Baltimore operations.
