= Pelliconi =

Italian bottle cap manufacturer

Pelliconi is an Italian bottle cap manufacturer. It is the largest privately owned bottle cap company in the world. It operates two plants in Italy and has its U.S. headquarters in Orlando, Florida, opened in 2010. It also has a plant in Egypt. The company makes plastic bottle caps and metal caps (crown caps).
