= Greenmount West, Baltimore =

Coordinates: 39°18′33″N 76°36′41″W

Greenmount West
- Neighborhood of Baltimore
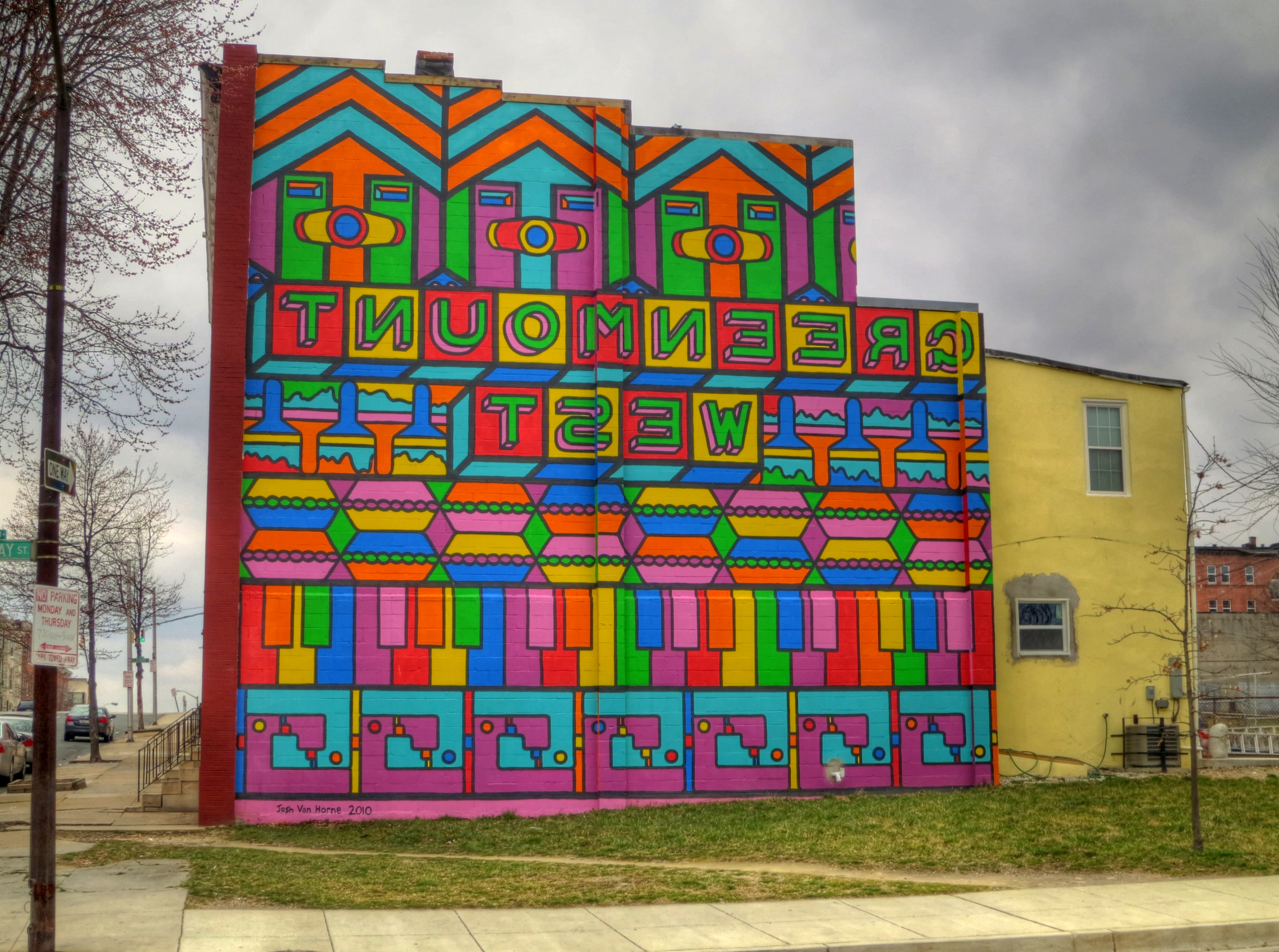
- Street art on the side of a rowhouse in Greenmount West

- Location within Baltimore
- Country: United States
- State: Maryland
- City: Baltimore
- Time zone: UTC-5 (Eastern)
  - Summer (DST): EDT
- ZIP code: 21201
- Area code: 410, 443, and 667

Greenmount West is a neighborhood in the state-designated Station North Arts District of Baltimore. Its borders consist of Hargrove Alley to the west, Hoffman Street and the Amtrak railroad tracks to the south, the south side of North Avenue to the north, and Greenmount Avenue to the east. Residents in the area include a mix of low, middle and high income families, artists, commuters to Washington DC and working-class Baltimoreans with the majority of residents of African American descent.

The neighborhood was one of many affected by the Baltimore riot of 1968. For years, the area suffered from urban decay, housing abandonment and crime, but in recent times the area has experienced a resurgence. Artists have created live/work space in the sprawling former Crown Cork and Seal factory buildings (commonly known as the Copycat Building) along the railroad tracks. Small developers are rehabbing the two and three story rowhouses for market rate homeownership. Pocket parks like McAllister Park, Hunters Lot and Brentwood Commons were created in the area, and the neighborhood's 2002 designation as an Arts and Entertainment District further catalyzed development. The real estate bubble of the 2000s caused Baltimore's housing prices to skyrocket, and drove home buyers seeking out cheaper areas on the upswing to the neighborhood. Housing sales in 2009 ranged between $169,000 - $320,000.

== Local attractions ==
Greenmount West is within walking distance to the Maryland Institute College of Art; Penn Station is directly south, providing walking-distance access to Amtrak, Light Rail and MARC commuter rail service (the latter being of particular interest to those commuting to Washington, D.C.). Mt. Vernon, Baltimore borders the neighborhood to the south.

Historic Green Mount Cemetery, located at 1501 Greenmount Avenue, is the final resting place of many famous and infamous Maryland and Baltimore figures (Enoch Pratt, John Wilkes Booth). The neighborhood was the early high school Baltimore home of the now deceased rapper Tupac Shakur.

As part of the Station North Arts and Entertainment District, Greenmount West is also within walking distance of the commercial district on Charles Street. This area includes attractions such as the Charles Theatre, a popular art house multiplex and many other businesses, arts spaces, and galleries. One block away is the Charm City Art Space which serves as a music venue and art gallery.

The Baltimore-based HBO drama The Wire was filmed here. Baltimore Montessori Public Charter School opened in the former Mildred Monroe Elementary School (The Wire's Primary School 32) in September 2008 and a graphic designer's letterpress now inhabits The Wire's "Bubbles Garage". City Arts, an affordable housing facility for artists at 440 E. Oliver Street which includes a gallery space, opened in November 2010.

== Maryland Arts and Entertainment District designation ==
The neighborhood's 2002 designation of the area as an arts district has furthered the neighborhood's transformation. The earliest and most visible signs of change were the official conversion of several industrial and warehouse buildings to mixed-use housing. These buildings had been in use for decades as artist's studios and (illegal) housing, and contributed toward the area winning arts district status under then-mayor Martin O'Malley. Such designation paved the way for these buildings to be rezoned for residential use.

In Maryland, the State Department of Business and Economic Development designates certain neighborhoods as “arts and entertainment districts”, which confers three specific tax breaks. Artists who live and work in the district are offered property-tax credits on qualifying renovations, can apply for an income-tax credit when they make money on their art, and are given a waiver of the admissions and amusement tax charged by the city. Artists who live or work in Station North may qualify for certain tax breaks by submitting Form 502AE (Subtraction For Income Derived Within An Arts and Entertainment District) with their Maryland Tax Returns. Major tax benefits concerning building usage are also in place, with assessment freezes and building rehab credits to encourage growth.

== Future development ==
As a part of the Station North Arts and Entertainment District, current plans for Greenmount West call for a major transformation of the neighborhood.

A 2006 Action Plan Report, prepared by Randall Gross / Development Economics, the Baltimore Neighborhood Collaborative, and Station North Arts & Entertainment, Inc., focuses on four key strategies for Station North: To strengthen positive image and identity, to establish commercial corridors, to provide housing options to attract new residents while preventing displacement of existing residents, and to encourage economic development.

In early 2010, construction began on City Arts, a $15 million housing development for artists. Located at 440 East Oliver Street in Greenmount West and consisting of 69 apartments for rent and eight town houses for sale, City Arts will be the first all-new housing project in the 100-acre (0.40 km^{2}) arts district since a $1 billion "vision plan" was unveiled for the area in 2008. The building will consist of four stories of apartments, a multipurpose first-floor space provided for artistic use by the residents, and thirty-five off-street parking spaces. Key to the project’s plans are financing regulations that will ensure the space remains affordable to artists even as the neighborhood changes. The project was featured on CNN as an example of how federal Recovery Act money has restarted development that stalled during the economic downturn.
