= Crown Holdings =

American manufacturing company

Crown Holdings, Inc.
- Brand-Building Packaging
- Type: Public company
- Traded as: NYSE: CCK; S&P 400 component
- ISIN: US2283681060
- Industry: Packaging
- Founded: 1892; 134 years ago
- Founder: William Painter
- Headquarters: Tampa, Florida, U.S.
- Area served: Worldwide
- Key people: Timothy J. Donahue (CEO, President, and Chairman)
- Products: Aerosol Packaging; Beverage Packaging; Food Packaging; Speciality Packaging
- Revenue: ▲US$12.4 billion (2025)
- Operating income: ▲US$1.6 billion (2025)
- Net income: ▲US$738 million (2025)
- Total assets: ▲US$14.3 billion (2025)
- Total equity: ▲US$3.5 billion (2025)
- Number of employees: c. 23,000 (2026)
- Website: www.crowncork.com

Crown Holdings, Inc. is an American multinational packaging company headquartered in Tampa, Florida, that designs and manufactures rigid-metal packaging including aluminum beverage cans, metal food cans, aerosol cans, and specialty packaging. Founded in 1892, as the Crown Cork & Seal Company, the company is ranked No. 356 in the Fortune 500 list for 2026. As of 2026, Crown employs over 23,000 people at 189 plants in 39 countries.

== History ==
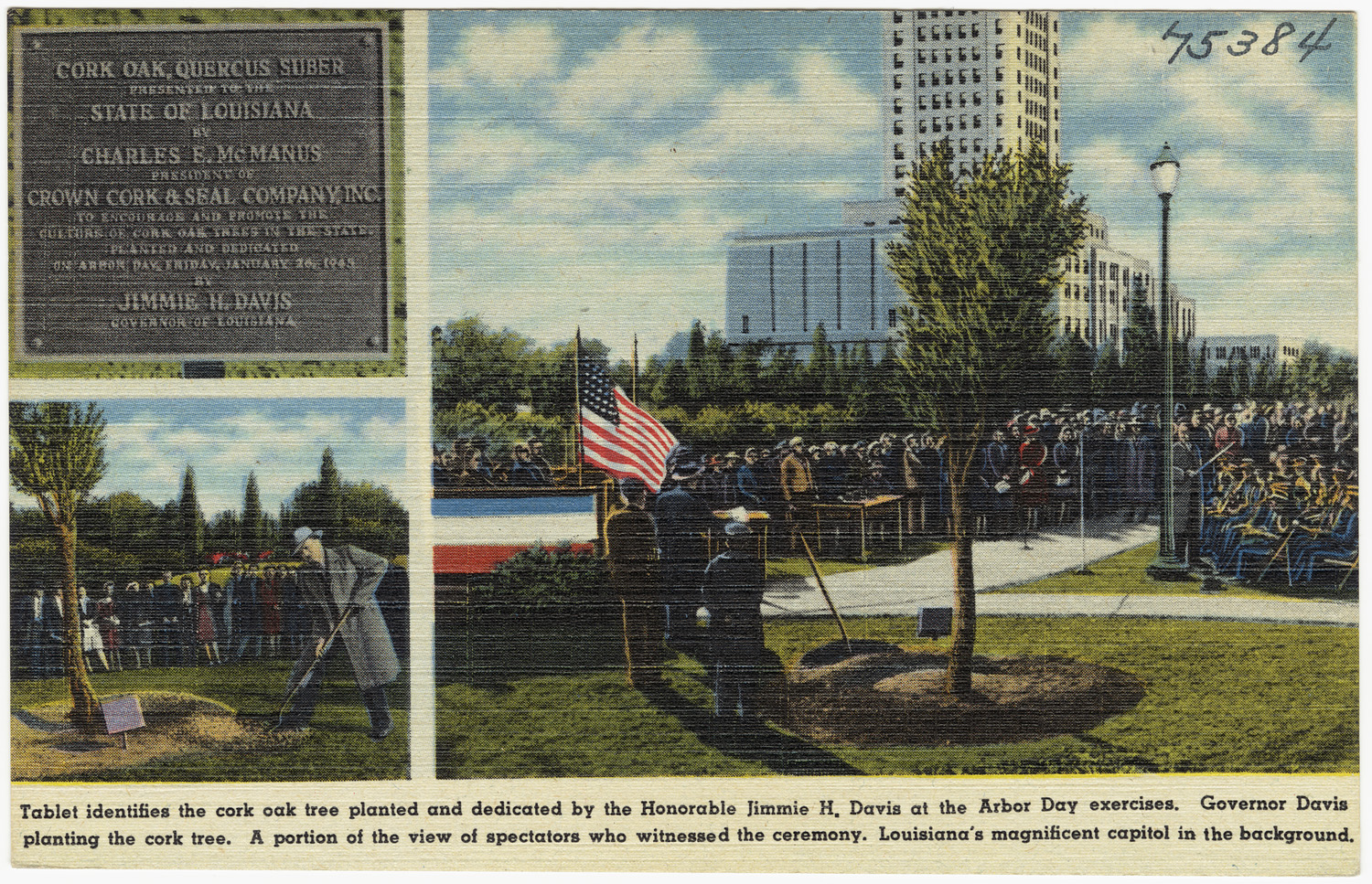
Cork oak tree planted and dedicated by Jimmie H. Davis at the Crown Cork plant in Louisiana.

William Painter, a Quaker from Maryland, invented the metal disposable bottle cap ("crown cork") for bottled carbonated beverages in 1891 and obtained patents on February 2, 1892. He founded his own manufacturing company, the Crown Cork and Seal Company, in Baltimore and sold bottlers that his cap was the right one in a crowded field of contraptions. By 1898, he had created a foot-powered crowner device to sell to bottlers and retailers so that they could seal the bottles with his caps quickly and easily. This helped gain acceptance of his bottle caps. By 1906, Crown had opened manufacturing plants in Brazil, France, Germany, Japan, and the United Kingdom.

By the 1930s, Crown was selling half of the world's supply of bottle caps. Crown entered the tin can business in 1936 with the purchase of the Acme Can Company of Philadelphia, which led to the creation of the Crowntainer, a funnel-shaped beer can, the following year.

To address market changes after World War I and Prohibition, Crown focused heavily on soft drinks. During World War II, Crown produced war products such as the Kork-N-Seal, the Pour-N-Seal, and the Merit Seal, as well as gas mask canisters. In 1957, John Connelly took over the presidency which was facing insolvency and moved the headquarters from Baltimore to Philadelphia. In 2003, Crown restructured as a public holding company. In 2005 and 2006 Crown exited the plastics industry with the sale of its Global Plastic Closure and its cosmetics packaging businesses.

In August 2023, it was announced Crown had acquired Helvetia Packaging - a beverage can manufacturing facility in Saarlouis, Germany.

== Regions ==
- Americas Division: Headquartered in Tampa, FL and serves North, Central and South America, with 46 plants and 5,600 employees which produce aerosol, beverage, food and specialty packaging, as well as metal closures.
- European Division: Headquartered in Zug, Switzerland, and serves Europe, Africa and the Middle East with 71 plants and 11,200 employees which produce aerosol, beverage, food and specialty packaging, as well as metal closures.
- Asia Pacific Division: Headquartered in Singapore, and serves Asia Pacific with 32 plants, 4,300 employees with aerosol, beverage, and food packaging, as well as metal closures.

== See also ==
- Crown cork
- King C. Gillette, was inspired while working as a salesman for Crown Cork and Seal to create a disposable product, the safety razor blade
