= Cone top =

Type of can

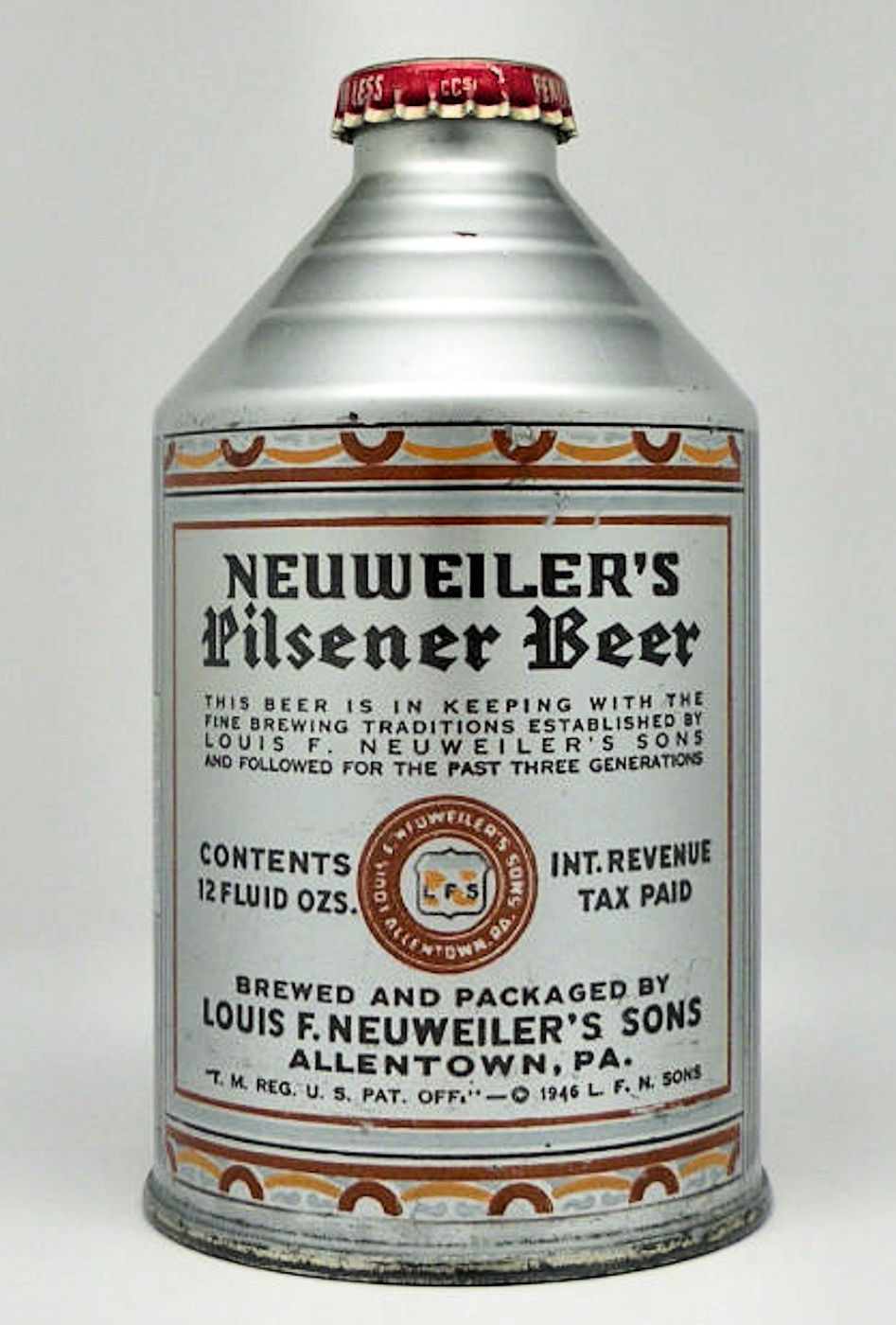
A 1946 Neuweiler Pilsner cone top beer can

A cone top (also called a cap-sealed can, cone-top, or conetop) is a type of can, especially a type of beverage can, introduced in 1935. Cone tops were designed in response to flat top beer cans as a hybrid between beer bottle and flat top can. Cone tops were especially attractive to smaller breweries which did not have the capital necessary to buy new canning machinery; cone tops could be filled on standard bottling equipment.

Because they were typically made with steel, beverage cans faded out during the metal shortages of World War II. They were continued after the war, but fell out of use in 1960. They are now considered collector's items.

Types:

- Low Profile, manufactured by Continental Can Co., was first marketed in 1935. It is named as such because the neck of the cone top is low. The earliest version of the low profile set the way for the Quart cone top which was produced until 1937.
- High Profile, manufactured by American Can Company, was the last cone top to enter the market and remained in use after World War II along with the Crowntainer.
- J Spout, manufactured by Crown Cork & Seal Company, was launched right after Continental Can Co.’s low profile version of the cone top. It is named “J Spout” because the thin neck resembles the letter J. It was Crown’s official move to canning beer instead of solely producing crown caps. The design was phased out during the beginning of World War II.
- Crowntainer, manufactured by Crown Cork & Seal Company, is unique because it has a continuous form instead of a separate cone top. Between 1940 and 1955 over 70 different breweries in the United States used the container which developed over 250 designs incorporating the metallic background.
