= Triadelphia Reservoir =

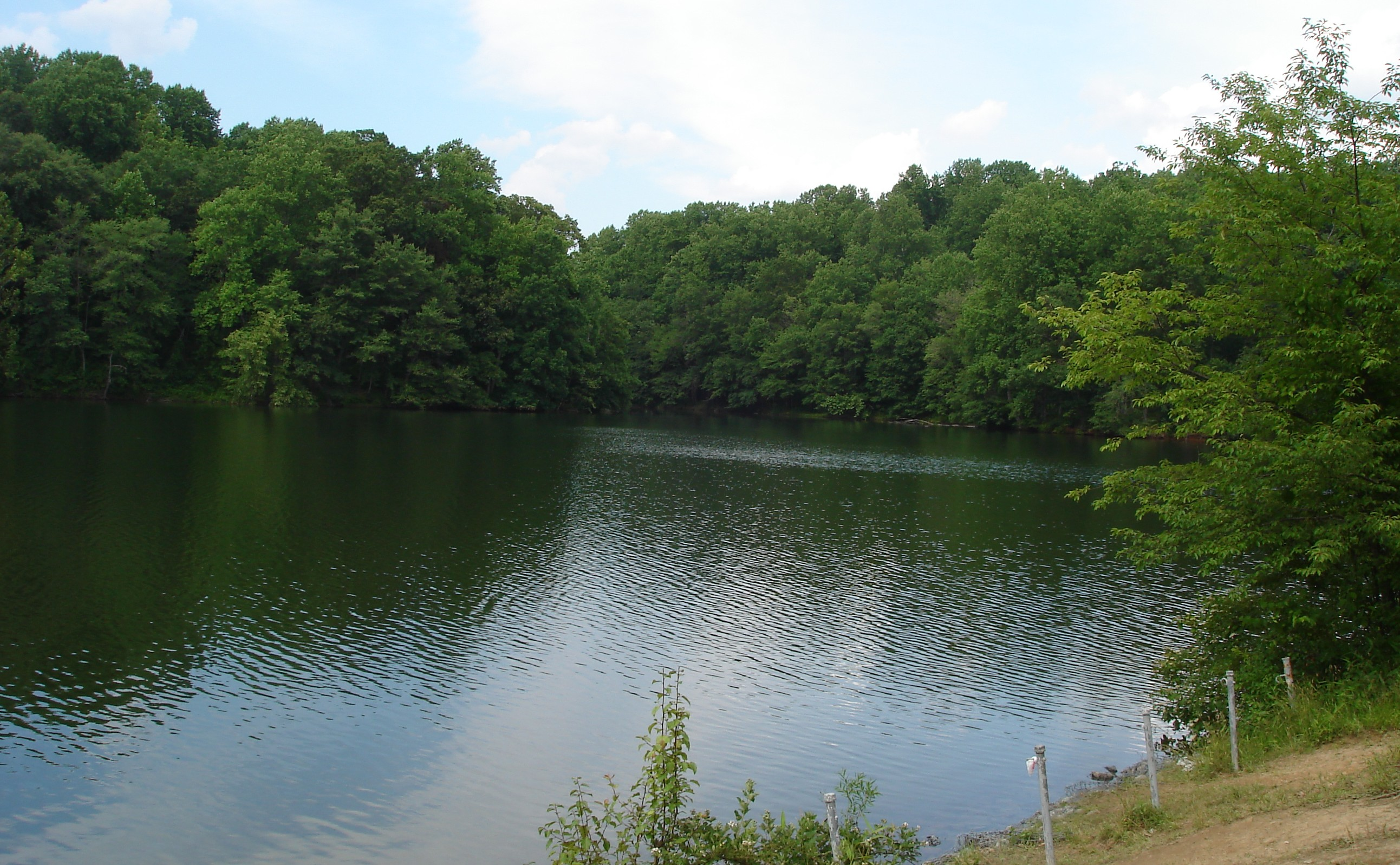

- Location within Maryland Location within the United States
- Location: Howard / Montgomery counties, near Brookeville, Maryland
- Coordinates: 39°12′27″N 77°00′48″W
- Type: reservoir
- Primary inflows: Patuxent River
- Primary outflows: Patuxent River
- Catchment area: 77.3 sq mi (200 km^{2})
- Basin countries: United States
- Surface area: 800 acres (3.2 km^{2})
- Average depth: 52 ft (16 m)
- Water volume: 6,200,000,000 US gal (0.023 km^{3})
- Surface elevation: 351 ft (107 m)

Triadelphia Reservoir is a reservoir located on the Patuxent River, in Howard County and Montgomery County, Maryland near the town of Brookeville.

The reservoir was created in 1943 by the construction of the Brighton Dam on the Patuxent.

== History ==
The river valley was once occupied by prehistoric Native American settlements surveyed in the 1980s when the modern dam was drained for maintenance.

The reservoir is located on a land grant surveyed by Benjamin Gaither in 1725. It was named after the town of Triadelphia which was founded in 1809 by three Quaker brothers-in-law. Isaac Briggs, Thomas Moore, and Revolutionary veteran and silversmith Caleb Bentley built a small town on 276 acres of land with nine houses, sawmill, general store, grist mill, and a mill race. The property was expanded to 515 acres containing the land grant "Benjamin's Lot" and "What's Left". The Triadelphia Cotton Factory (Montgomery Manufacturing Company) managed by Allen Bowie Davis operated 196 spindles from its waterwheel and grew to several dozen buildings by 1850 including Mt. Carmel Methodist Church and a schoolhouse. In 1868 a flood washed away a portion of the city and a second flood destroyed most of the remainder. The Triadelphia Turnpike company operated a toll road from Triadelphia to Glenelg to the Baltimore-Frederick Turnpike, now labeled Triadelphia road. By 1905 the town was mostly abandoned. The Ligon family purchased the land, using it for storage and tenants until it went underwater with the construction of the reservoir.

Triadelphia was the birthplace and boyhood home of William Painter (1838-1906), a Quaker and serial inventor, he is best known for inventing the metal bottle cap ("crown cork") for which he created a company in Baltimore Crown Cork & Seal that would eventually produce more than half the world's supply of bottle caps; it grew to become one of the largest manufacturing plants in the United States.

== Reservoir ==
It has a surface area of 800 acres (3.2 km^{2}). The reservoir holds approximately 6,300,000,000 US gallons (19,000 acre⋅ft) of drinking water source and is managed by the Washington Suburban Sanitary Commission (WSSC).

== Dam ==
The 60-foot (18 m) high Brighton Dam was put into operation in 1943. In 2017, the WSSC began a renovation project in order to rehabilitate the 13 tainter gates and the dam's concrete spillway surface, and the original intake gates and bar screen. The project began in June 2017, and was completed in December 2019.

== Recreation ==
WSSC provides recreational facilities to the public on portions of the Triadelphia property, including hiking, picnicking, fishing, boating, horseback riding, and hunting. Permits are required for any boating, and only self-powered or battery powered vessels are allowed. This is enforced by law enforcement who actively patrol the area.

== See also ==
- Rocky Gorge Reservoir
