= William Painter (inventor) =

American mechanical engineer and inventor

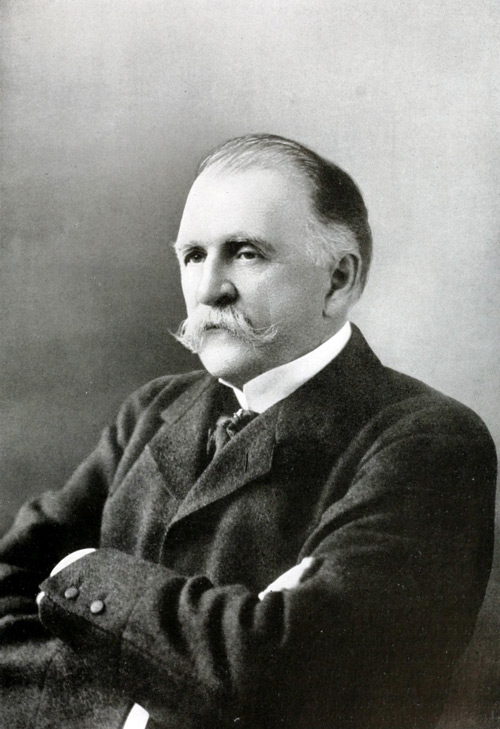
- Born: November 20, 1838; Triadelphia, Montgomery County, Maryland, United States
- Died: July 15, 1906 (aged 67); Baltimore, Maryland, United States
- Burial place: Druid Ridge Cemetery, Pikesville, Baltimore County, Maryland, United States
- Occupations: Inventor, engineer
- Spouse: Harriet Deacon Painter (m. 1861)
- Parent(s): Dr. Edward Painter; Louisa Gilpin Painter

William Painter (November 20, 1838 – July 15, 1906) was an American mechanical engineer, inventor and the founder of Crown Cork & Seal Company in Baltimore (since evolved to Crown Holdings, Inc., a Fortune 500 company). He most notably invented the crown cork bottle cap, also known as the metal bottle cap.

== Early life and career ==
Painter was born in 1838 in Triadelphia, then a mill town in Montgomery County, Maryland to Quakers Dr. Edward Painter and Louisa Gilpin Painter. He moved to Baltimore, Maryland in 1865 to begin a career as a foreman at the Murrill & Keizer's machine shop. He worked with manufacturers to develop a universal neck for all glass bottles and started the Crown Cork & Seal Company of Baltimore in 1892 to manufacture caps that could be used to seal the universal necks. He died in July 1906 at 67.

== Patents ==
Painter patented 85 inventions, including the common bottle cap, the bottle opener, a machine for crowning bottles, a paper-folding machine, a safety ejection seat for passenger trains, and also a machine for detecting counterfeit currency.

He was inducted to the National Inventors Hall of Fame in 2006.
