= Charm City Art Space =

Venue/art space in Baltimore, Maryland, US

- CCAS
- Interactive map of Charm City Art Space
- Address: 1731 Maryland Ave
- Location: Baltimore, Maryland, United States
- Events: Punk rock; hardcore punk; Indie rock

Construction
- Opened: 2002
- Closed: 2015

Charm City Art Space was a music venue/art space located at 1731 Maryland Avenue, in Baltimore, Maryland, United States, in the Station North arts district. This area is home to several do it yourself (DIY) projects, including the Velocipede Bike Project and the Jerk Store. It has also been known as the space, the art space, or CCAS.

The CCAS opened in summer 2002 to be a community-run facility where artists and musicians could showcase their work. It was a mixed-use facility with frequent art exhibits and a large zine library, but functioned primarily as a music venue for smaller independent music acts. It hosted its first show on July 1, 2002. By October 2009, it had hosted more than 1000 shows, mostly hardcore punk and indie acts, including The Thermals, Modern Life Is War, and Majority Rule.

The CCAS was collectively run and allowed members to teach and book shows. At monthly meetings, members discussed finances, membership, and the maintenance and repair needs of the space. It was a non-discriminatory venue, welcoming people of all ages, genders, races, and religions. The venue was drug- and alcohol-free.

The CCAS drew inspiration from larger independent music venues such as 924 Gilman, ABC No Rio, and the Mr. Roboto Project.

Charm City Art Space closed in November 2015.
