= Crown cork =

Form of bottle cap

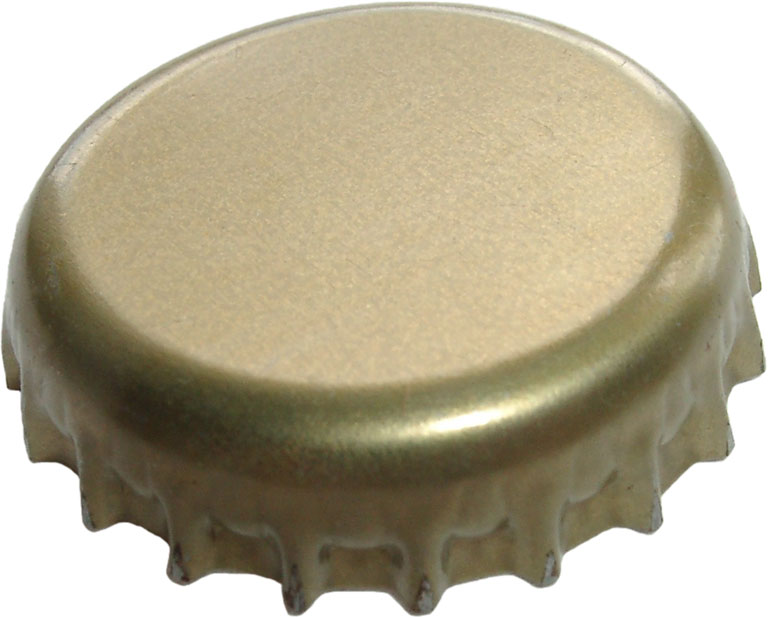
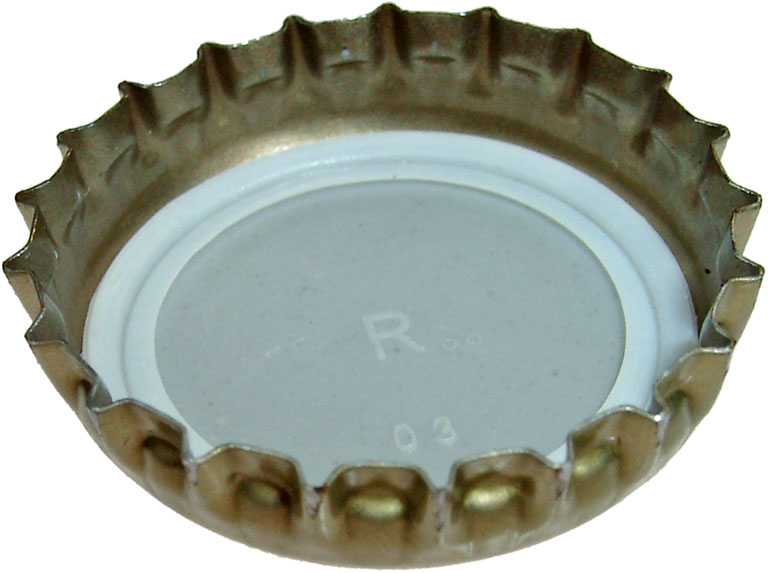
A generic 21-tooth crown cork bottle cap

Opening a crown capped bottle

The crown cork (also known as a crown seal, crown cap, metal bottle cap, or just cap) was the first commercially successful bottle cap design. It was invented by William Painter in 1892 in Baltimore. Painter had been working for years trying various bottle cap designs, with his company the Bottle Seal Company. After he patented the crown cork in 1892, which was an immediate success, he started a new company, Crown Cork & Seal Company (now Crown Holdings) which went on to become one of the largest manufacturing companies in the United States producing billions of caps annually.

== History ==
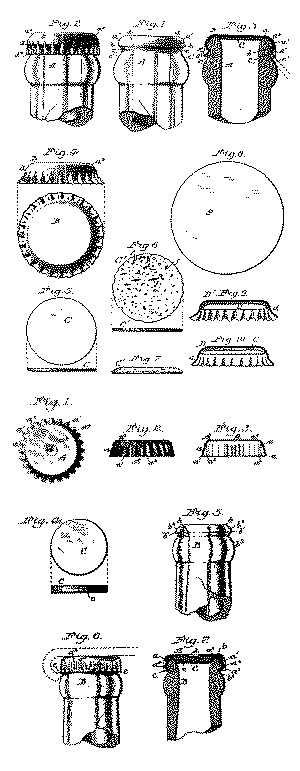
A Dutch patent application from 1892

The inventor was William Painter who was born in 1838 in Tridelphia, Maryland to a Quaker family. Described as an "irrepressible tinkerpreneur," he had no higher education but had the drive to "make something." In the late 19th century, the market for bottled beverages like beer and soda was growing, but sealing carbonated drinks was a problem. Existing stoppers were a mix of cork, glass, wire, and rubber contraptions. They were often expensive, unsanitary, and unreliable. Corks could dry out and shrink, causing leaks, while other stoppers were difficult to clean and could affect the taste. By the 1880s, the U.S. Patent Office had approved an estimated 1,500 different bottle stopper patents. While working as a foreman at Baltimore's Murrill & Keizer machine shop, Painter became preoccupied with the bottle stopper challenge. In 1885, he patented two stoppers: the "Triumph," a wire-retaining stopper, and the "Bottle Seal" (also known as the "Baltimore loop seal"). The Bottle Seal was a simple, flat rubber disk that fit into a groove inside the bottle's mouth, forming an "inverted arch" that resisted internal pressure; an embedded loop of wire eased removal. It was cheap enough to be disposable, selling for just twenty-five cents per gross, a fraction of the cost of reusable stoppers. To manufacture it, Painter and his business partner Samuel Cook formed the Bottle Seal Company.

Unsatisfied with the success of the Bottle Seal, he experimented between 1888 and 1891 on a better external cap. Patent number US 468259 applied for on November 5, 1889, featured a cap with holes on the top to facilitate leverage for removal with a hand instrument. However to prevent leakage through the holes required a long piece of cork and likewise a long skirt, neither of which were effective or cheap. Then Painter realized the cap could easily be removed by levering it off with a lifting device, a "bottle cap opener", making the holes on the cap superfluous and also reducing the amount of cork. Patent number US 468258 was applied for on June 18, 1890. It had a slightly shorter skirt, the cork thickness was reduced, and there were no holes in the cap. In further experiments Painter discovered that the cork and skirt length could be reduced even further. Patent number US 468226 was applied for on May 19, 1891 — a lower patent number despite being a later application — it further shortened the skirt and reduced the cork thickness. This last patent perfected the design.

In its final form, the thin cork liner created a gas-tight seal, while the metal cap held it in place with a series of crimped "flutes" that locked under the bottle's head. This approach was not only sanitary—eliminating contact between the beverage and the metal cap—but so effective that its basic design is still in use to this day. Painter understood the cap's advantage as a small, cheap and most importantly a disposable product. It guaranteed never-ending sales, a very low cost to manufacture, and no ongoing stopper maintenance (collecting, cleaning, repairing). In his patent application, he noted that he had devised "metallic sealing-caps... so inexpensive as to warrant throwing them away after a single use." This concept was unusual in an era accustomed to reuse. On February 2, 1892, Painter was granted three patents for his new system: one for the cap itself, one for the sealing disk's composition, and one for the use of cork and other materials. The family dubbed the invention the "crown cap," and Painter's son Orrin drew the company's crown logo. One editor marveled that the invention "crowned one of the most troublesome inventive problems with a success which is simply dazzling."

In 1892, Painter patented the invention and founded the Crown Cork & Seal Company in Baltimore to manufacture his new invention. Painter died in 1906 having lived long enough to see it become widely adopted. The expiration of Painter's original patents in 1909 opened the company to competition and further solidified the ubiquity of the crown cap. In 1923 the crown-finish bottle was standardized by the relevant national standards body. In the late 1920s, "spot crowns" were invented that placed vinyl or aluminum foil underneath the cap to protect the liquid product from spoiling on contact with the cork or metal, for certain types of drinks. A shallower shell and shorter skirt was introduced in the 1950s to reduce material cost. In the same decade the cork liner began to be replaced with plastic liners which are still in use to this day.

== See also ==
- Bottle opener
- Flip-top
