= Station North Arts and Entertainment District =

Coordinates: 39°18′33.5″N 76°36′59″W

Station North Arts and Entertainment District Charles North, Koreatown
- Neighborhood of Baltimore
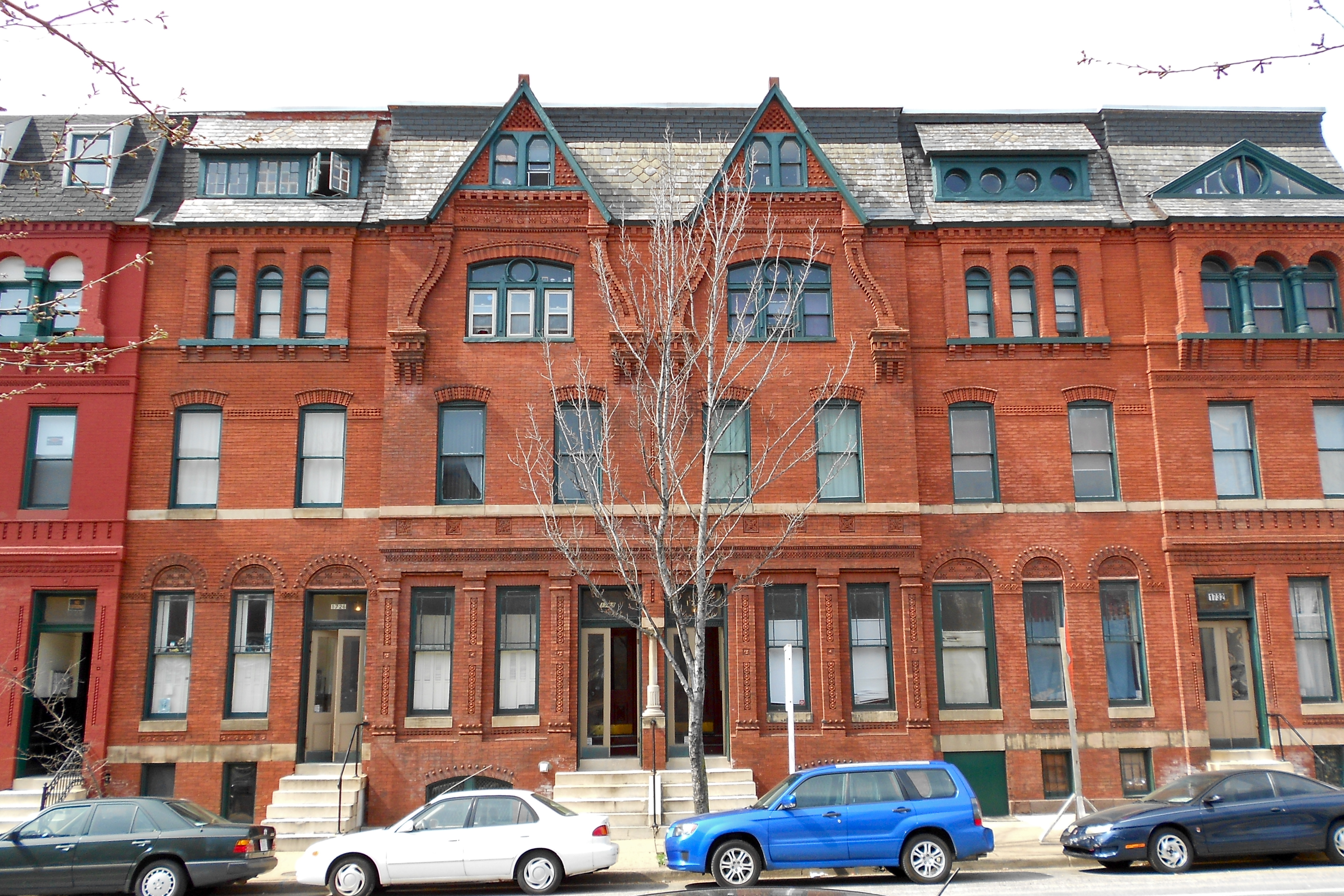
- Historic rowhouses on Saint Paul Street in Station North

- Location within Baltimore
- Country: United States
- State: Maryland
- City: Baltimore
- Named after: Penn Station, North Avenue
- Time zone: UTC-5 (Eastern)
  - Summer (DST): EDT
- ZIP code: 21201, 21202
- Area code: 410, 443, and 667
- Website: http://stationnorth.org/

The Station North Arts and Entertainment District (often referred to as just Station North) is an area and official arts and entertainment district in the U.S. city of Baltimore, Maryland. The neighborhood is marked by a combination of artistically leaning commercial ventures, such as theaters and museums, as well as formerly abandoned warehouses that have since been converted into loft-style living. It is roughly triangular, bounded on the north by 20th Street, on the east by Greenmount Avenue, and on the south and west by the tracks of Amtrak's Northeast Corridor, though the neighborhood's boundaries include a one-block wide extension over the tracks.

== History ==
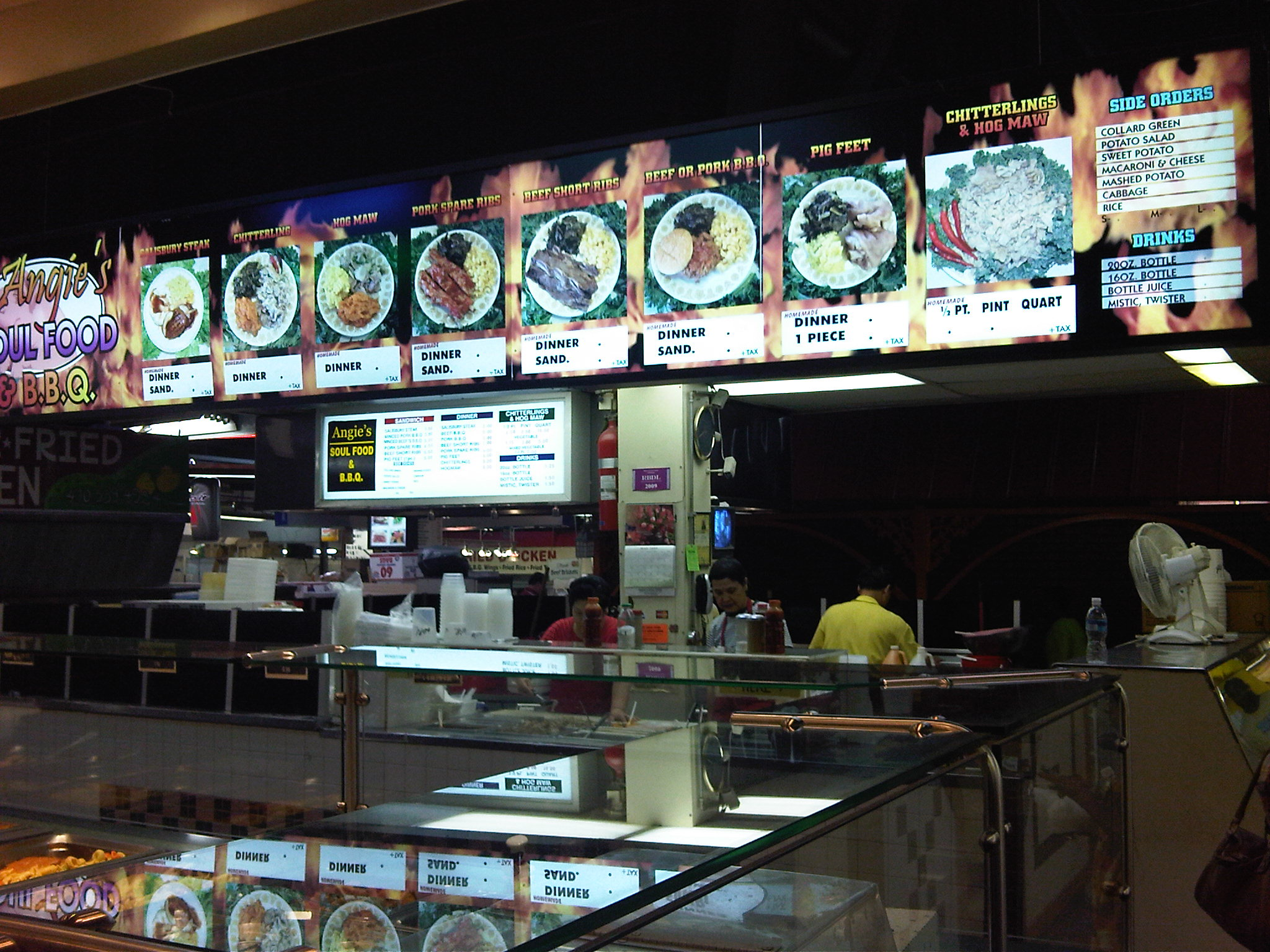
Korean-American food stalls at Lexington Market, May 2009

Station North is composed of portions of three Baltimore neighborhoods: Charles North, Greenmount West, and Barclay.

In recent decades, the area represented a relatively impoverished area between the wealthier neighborhoods of Mount Vernon, Bolton Hill, and Charles Village. However, a number of factors also made the area amenable to redevelopment and gentrification.

Many of even the poorer sections of the neighborhood feature three-story, early 20th-century rowhouses as the main housing stock; the Maryland Institute College of Art is within walking distance; and Penn Station lies at the south edge of the neighborhood, providing walking-distance access to Amtrak, Light Rail and MARC commuter rail service (the latter being of particular interest to those commuting to Washington, D.C.). The real estate bubble of the 2000s caused Baltimore's housing prices to skyrocket, and drove home buyers seeking out cheaper areas on the upswing to the neighborhood.

The Baltimore city government's 2002 designation of the area as an arts district has furthered the neighborhood's transformation. The earliest and most visible signs of change were the official conversion of several industrial and warehouse buildings to mixed-use housing. The Copycat Building is probably the best known, but two other buildings — the Oliver Street Studios Building (which also houses Area 405 and the Station North Tool Library) and the Cork Factory — are also occupied. These buildings have been in use recently as artist's studios and benefitted by the area winning the State of Maryland's first Arts and Entertainment District status under then-mayor Martin O'Malley. Such designation paved the way for these buildings to be rezoned for residential use, due to the collaboration between multiple building owners in The District.

The Korean immigrant community in the city was the most solid from the 1970s until the 1990s, after which urban flight led many Koreans to settle in surrounding counties, particularly Howard County. A cluster of Korean establishments still exist in the lower part of Charles Village and the Station North Arts and Entertainment District.

The neighborhood's commercial, residential, and artistic venues began to thrive. The commercial district on Charles Street is anchored by the Charles Theatre, an art house multiplex that also serves as the anchor venue for the annual Maryland Film Festival each May, as well as Artscape (a music and arts festival) each Labor Day weekend, as well as a number of galleries, cafés and theaters. One block away is the Charm City Art Space which serves as a Music Venue, and Art Gallery. The nearby "Chicken Box" is home to the Baltimore Annex Theater.

The legendary Hour Haus music and arts facility (located at Howard Street and North Avenue) came into existence circa 1985 and is widely recognized for its 25-year run ending in 2015. The name, coined by co-founder David Fodel, linked Tom Wolfe's 1981 novel From Bauhaus to Our House with the "Hour TV" repair shop downstairs and was a phonetic play on "Our House," signaling a welcoming, communal, and lived-in DIY collective for local artists.

== Maryland Arts and Entertainment District designation ==
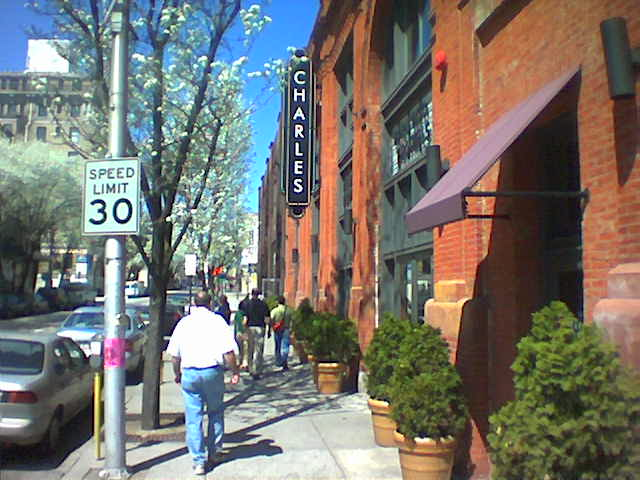
Looking north on Charles Street, with the Charles Theatre on the right

In Maryland, the State Department of Business and Economic Development designates certain neighborhoods "arts and entertainment districts", which confers three specific tax breaks. Artists who live and work in the district are offered property-tax credits on qualifying renovations, can apply for an income-tax credit when they make money on their art, and are given a waiver of the admissions and amusement tax charged by the city. Artists who live or work in Station North may qualify for certain tax breaks by submitting Form 502AE (Subtraction For Income Derived Within An Arts and Entertainment District) with their Maryland Tax Returns. Major tax benefits concerning building usage are also in place, with assessment freezes and building rehab credits to encourage growth.

== Attractions ==
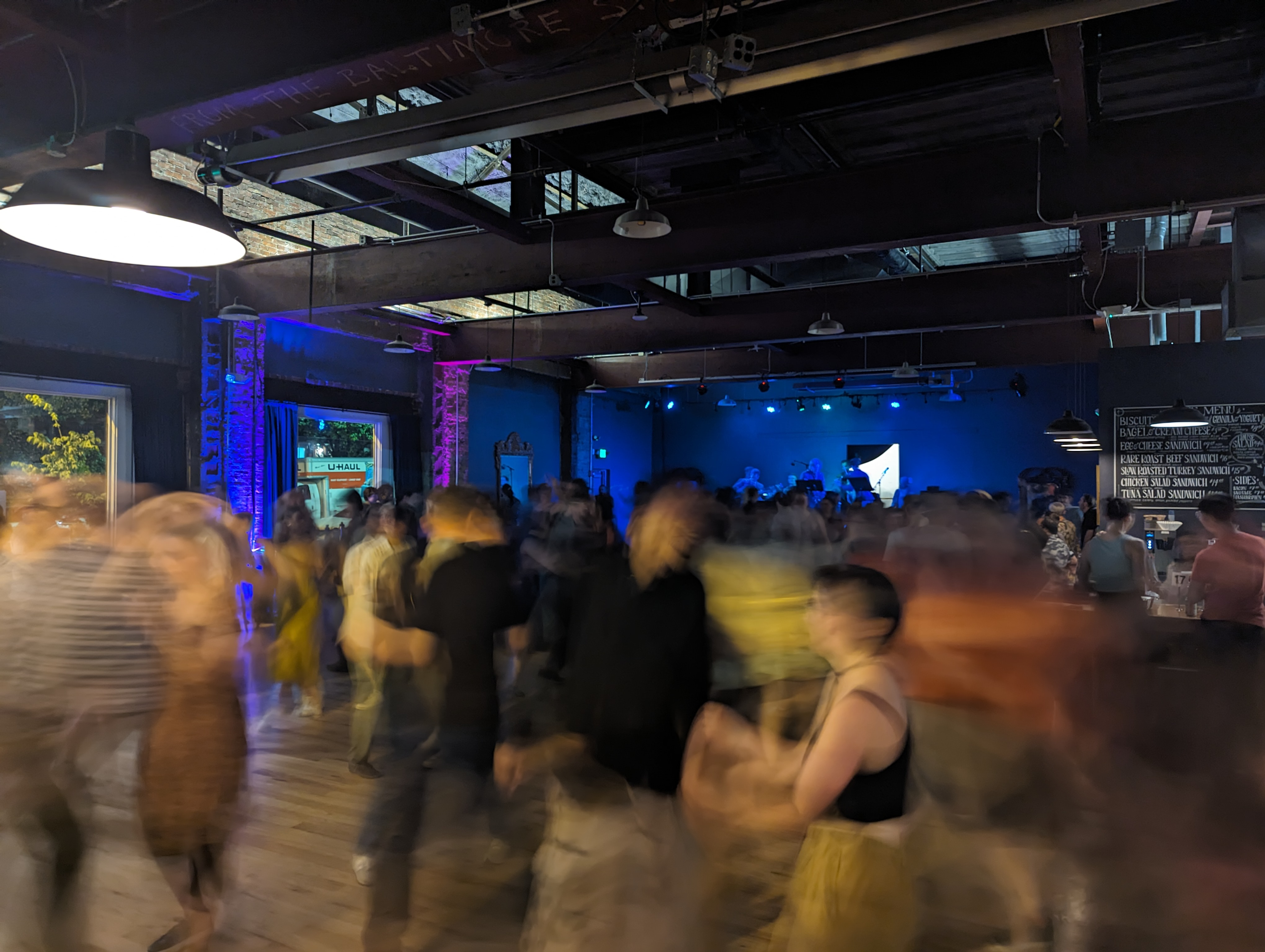
Dancers at Mobtown Ballroom

Mobtown Ballroom draws a diverse crowd of hundreds of people from surrounding towns to Station North for its swing dance, belly dance, and Lindy Hop lessons.

== Criticism of gentrification ==
Although the city and state have developed preliminary plans to provide affordable housing and work space for local artists and residents, many argue that the area provides few actual benefits to working artists. This has fostered the sentiment that the city has been exploiting the cachet of the artists in Station North, while rarely working with them in any meaningful way.

Furthermore, as the neighborhood undergoes gentrification, Westnorth Studio owner Roy Crosse and Nancy Haragan, then executive director of the Greater Baltimore Cultural Alliance expressed a concern in The Urbanite that, like SoHo in Manhattan before it, local artists and entertainers will be forced out of the neighborhood if a proper balance is not struck between redevelopment and the needs of artists and lower income residents.

== Transportation ==
Station North's name comes from its location, to the north of the city's Penn Station, which is served by Amtrak and MARC trains. The Baltimore Light Rail line has two stations serving the district; Penn Station and North Avenue. MTA Maryland bus lines 3, 8, 11, 13, 27, 36, 61, and 64 also serve the area.

== Plans ==
A 2006 Action Plan Report, prepared by Randall Gross / Development Economics, the Baltimore Neighborhood Collaborative, and Station North Arts & Entertainment, Inc., focuses on four key strategies: To strengthen positive image and identity, to establish commercial corridors, to provide housing options to attract new residents while preventing displacement of existing residents, and to encourage economic development.

In early 2008, Baltimore's development arm, the Baltimore Development Corporation (BDC), released a preview of their master plan for the area. In the near term, the master plan includes converting the top three floors of Penn Station into a boutique hotel, with long-term goals including construction of high-rise residential buildings.

On October 30, 2008, Mayor Sheila Dixon unveiled the Charles North Vision Plan, a multi-phased development initiative. This plan identified four areas to focus revitalization on: Charles Gateway/Penn Station, the corner of Charles Street and North Avenue, the creation of an "Asia Town" at 20th Street and Charles Street, and the "Creative/Design Zone". The plan's ultimate goal is to transform the arts and entertainment district north of Pennsylvania Station into a $1 billion "cultural crossroads" for Baltimore. The plan calls for over $100 million in subsidies to aid in the development of the area.

An agreement with Hospitality Partners of Bethesda to construct the hotel in Penn Station was reached in 2009, with completion of the $9 million project scheduled for late 2010.

In early 2010, construction began on City Arts, a $15 million housing development for artists. Consisting of 69 apartments for rent and eight town houses for sale, City Arts will be the first all-new housing project in the 100-acre (0.40 km^{2}) arts district since a $1 billion "vision plan" was unveiled for the area in 2008. The building is designed to consist of four stories of apartments, a multipurpose first-floor space provided for artistic use by the residents, and thirty-five off-street parking spaces. Key to the project's plans are financing regulations that will ensure the space remains affordable to artists even as the neighborhood changes. The project was featured on CNN as an example of how federal Recovery Act money has restarted development that stalled during the economic downturn.
