= James Leroy Murrill =

James Leroy Murrill (January 5, 1847 – April 26, 1937) is believed to be the last surviving Confederate veteran in Baltimore.

== Early life ==
James Leroy Murrill was born on January 5, 1847, in Nelson County, Virginia. His father was a teacher, preacher, farmer, and a railroad boss. In 1863, with war raging in his home state, James Leroy Murrill, then aged 17, enlisted in the Confederate States Army. He served in the 3rd Virginia Infantry Regiment (Company H); part of Kemper's/Terry's Virginia Brigade. He served in several major campaigns until Robert E. Lee's surrender at the Appomattox Court House, a mere 17 miles away from Murrill's home. Unlike most Confederate veterans, his walk home was easy.

After the war, Murrill moved to Baltimore, Maryland, where he worked at his uncle's factory, the Murrill & Keizer Company, on 212 Holliday street next door to the Baltimore City Hall. He worked as a mechanist while also attending the Maryland Institute for Mechanical Drawling. After Murrill graduated, he was granted the Peabody Prize for his achievements at the factory. He was a talented mechanical drawer. Murrill taught at the institute for 4 years. Later, he became the school commissioner from 1887-1891.

== Later life ==
James Murrill became President of Murrill & Keizer Company, which was a very profitable business for many years. So profitable, in fact, he gave the company to his employees. Many had worked for the company for over 50 years.

Murrill was the president of the Lafayette Perpetual Building and Loan Association for forty years until his death in 1937. He was the president of the Baltimore Automatic Fire Alarm Company for many years. He was a member of the Masonic Order, and the Virginia Society.

His wife, Fraces Wheeler, died in 1914. Murrill died in Baltimore, Maryland, on April 26, 1937, at the age of 91. He was survived by his son Leroy Keizer Murrill (named after Louis Keizer from the Murrill & Keizer Company) and three grandchildren.
