= Brookeville, Maryland =

- Town
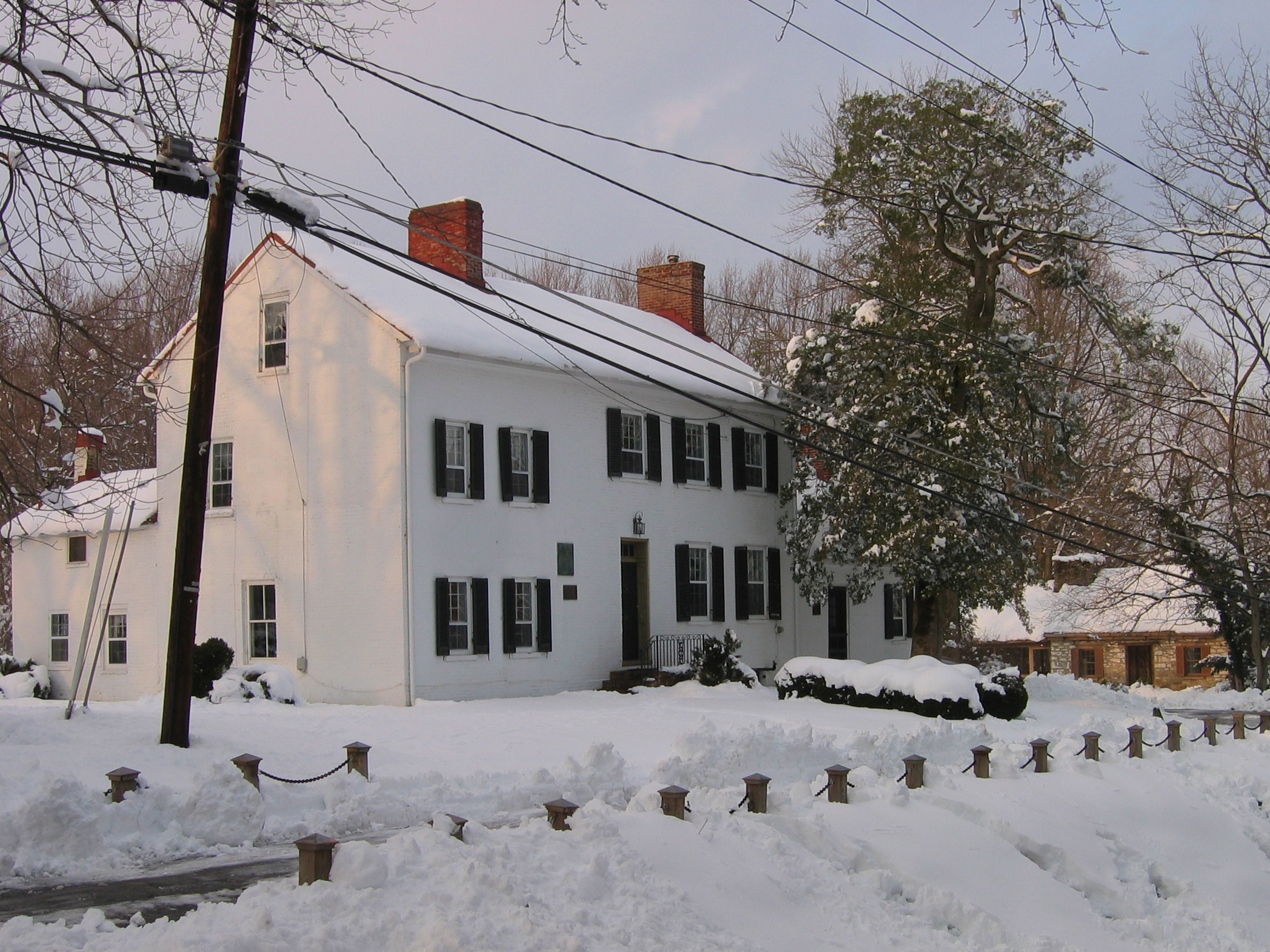
- The Madison House in February 2006. It was built around 1800 and originally owned by Caleb Bentley. The house provided refuge for President James Madison, on August 26, 1814, after the British burned Washington, D.C., during the War of 1812.

- Seal
- Motto: "United States Capital For A Day August 26, 1814"
- Location of Brookeville in Montgomery County, Maryland, Inset: Location of Montgomery County in Maryland.
- Coordinates: 39°10′51″N 77°03′33″W
- Country: United States
- State: Maryland
- County: Montgomery
- Settled: 1794
- Incorporated: 1808

Area
  - Total: 0.14 sq mi (0.36 km^{2})
  - Land: 0.14 sq mi (0.36 km^{2})
  - Water: 0 sq mi (0.00 km^{2})
- Elevation: 433 ft (132 m)

Population (2020)
  - Total: 166
  - Density: 1,189.0/sq mi (459.09/km^{2})
  - Demonym: Brookevillian
- Time zone: UTC-5 (Eastern (EST))
  - Summer (DST): UTC-4 (EDT)
- ZIP Code: 20833
- Area codes: 301, 240
- FIPS code: 24-10225
- GNIS feature ID: 2390755
- Website: townofbrookevillemd.org

Brookeville is a town in Montgomery County, Maryland, located 20 km (12 mi) north of Washington, D.C., and 2 km (1.2 mi) north of Olney. Brookeville was settled by Quakers late in the 18th century and was incorporated as a town in 1808. Historically a farming town, Brookeville is now at the northern edge of the densely developed Washington suburbs. The population was 166 at the 2020 census.

Brookeville is notable as the "United States Capital for a Day": when British troops burned Washington, D.C., during the War of 1812, President James Madison sought refuge in the town on August 26, 1814. During the American Civil War, Brookeville, along with nearby Sandy Spring, was a stop on the Underground Railroad.

== Overview ==
The U.S. Postal Service (USPS) defines a larger area as Brookeville than what falls within the town boundaries. This includes areas extending to the Patuxent River and the Howard County border, and including the small hamlets of Sunshine and Brighton. Reddy Branch Stream Valley Park surrounds the Town of Brookeville, with the creek flowing west to east towards the Patuxent. Other parks and recreational areas include Rachel Carson Conservation Park, Patuxent River State Park, and the Triadelphia Reservoir. Areas to the north of Brookeville in Howard County and Carroll County have also experienced rapid population growth. Georgia Avenue carries a substantial volume of traffic through the town, from these areas to the north into Montgomery County and Washington, D.C. In 1966, county planning officials recommended that a bypass be built to carry commuters around the town. The project was completed on November 2024.

Brookeville is an affluent residential community, with a large portion of residents employed with the government or related professional jobs. The town is governed by a three-person town commission, while surrounding unincorporated areas are administered by the county. Historically, the Brookeville Academy was an important educational institution for the community. In 1883, Sherwood High School opened as a Friends school and became a public school in 1909, serving Brookeville and other nearby areas.

== History ==
Quakers Richard Thomas and his wife Deborah Brooke founded the town of Brookeville in 1794, and named it after her family. The town was established on land inherited by Deborah Brooke from her father Roger Brooke IV, son of an influential Quaker landholder, James Brooke. At the time, Brooke was the largest landholder in what would become Montgomery County. Thomas set up a mill, along the Reddy Branch, which forms the northern border of the town. Caleb Bentley opened a store and a post office in 1802, becoming the first postmaster of Brookeville. The town's charter was approved in 1808, though not formally issued until 1890.

Brookeville served as a market town for the agriculture industry in the surrounding area. During the 19th century, Brookeville was home to several mills, the Brookeville Academy (initially a boys' school), a post office, a blacksmith's shop, St. Luke's Episcopal Church, Salem Methodist Protestant Church, and a number of shops. Newlin's Mill, located on the west side of town, processed high-quality castor oil and ground limestone for plaster. Thomas Mill was located on the east side of town. To transport goods more easily to markets in Washington, D.C., a prosperous farmer established a company in 1849 to build a toll road to connect Brookeville to the Seventh Street Pike. The turnpike was sold to the state of Maryland in 1914, and later became Georgia Avenue, now Maryland Route 97.

Brookeville was home to Thomas Moore Jr., who along with Caleb Bentley was instrumental in the creation of the U.S. Department of Agriculture. Moore is also credited as the inventor of the first refrigerator, and coining the term. He created a portable contraption to transport butter and other products to sell at markets in Washington. His products commanded a high price, due to the extra freshness of the products at the market. Moore lived near the town, at Longwood Manor, which was built in 1817.

=== War of 1812 ===
During the War of 1812, when the British burned parts of Washington, D.C., the federal government and troops fled the capital. President James Madison first fled to Virginia, but then turned north. He arrived in Rockville at 6 p.m. on August 26, 1814, expecting to find General William H. Winder and his troops. But they had already proceeded on towards Baltimore. Madison continued eastward and arrived in Brookeville on horseback. He reportedly carried with him a strongbox, which contained the entire U.S. treasury. On the night of August 26, he stayed in the home of Caleb Bentley, whose wife Henrietta Thomas was close friends with Dolley Madison.

Madison stayed up all night, dispatching orders, while soldiers remained on guard outside. After the British left Washington, they sailed to nearby Baltimore, where they attacked Fort McHenry and were repulsed. Upon hearing that news, Madison returned to Washington. Madison wrote a note to his wife that morning.

Finding that our army has left Montgomery Court House, we pushed on to this place, with a view to join it, or proceed to the city, as further information might prescribe. I have just received a line from Col. Monroe saying that the enemy were out of Washington on the retreat to their ships and advising our immediate return to Washington. I know not where we are in the first instance to hide our heads; but shall look for a place on my arrival.

— James Madison

=== Late 19th century ===
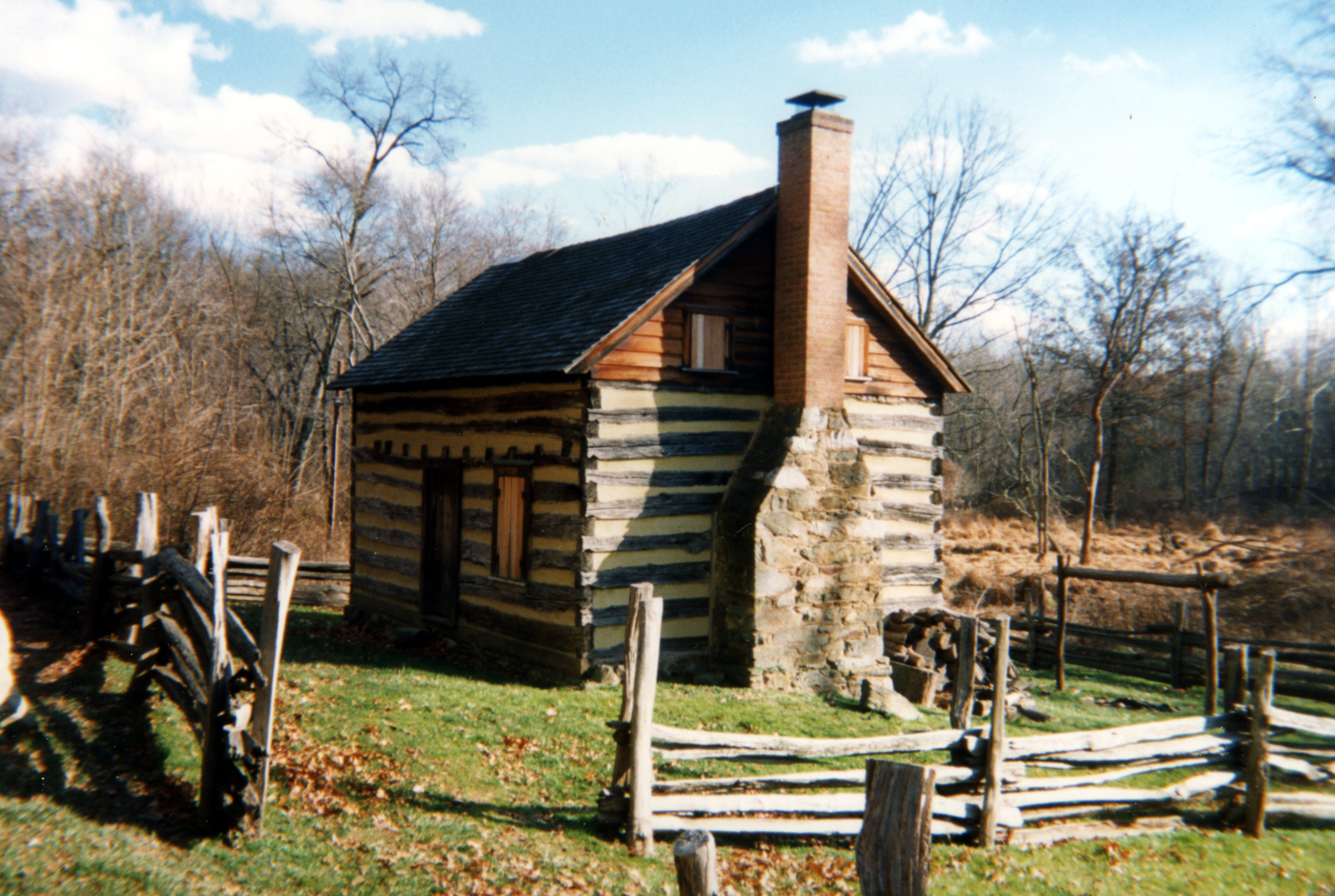
Oakley cabin

The Oakley Farm, located on the western edge of Brookeville, thrived during the 18th and 19th centuries. Log cabins, dating from the 1820s, were built on the Oakley/Dorsey farm, to house slaves and later free black families. The Oakley Cabin is now maintained by the Montgomery County Department of Parks. A number of other 18th and 19th century cabins still exist on private property in the Brookeville area.

During the American Civil War, George B. McClellan sent Union troops (the First and Ninth Corps) through Brookeville, on their way to Antietam. This was one of three groups of troops that came from different directions towards Antietam. The Quakers played an instrumental role in aiding escaped slaves on the Underground Railroad. Nearby Sandy Spring was an important stop. Historians suggest that the Madison House was also used as a stop on the Underground Railroad during the Civil War. Part of the Madison House once served as the town's post office. A false stone wall in the room hid a staircase that descended in two directions, including into a hidden area in the basement where escaped slaves could hide.

=== 20th century ===
In 1910, the Salem United Methodist Church was built to replace a church that had been destroyed by fire, and the church cemetery has been there since the mid-19th century. By 1900, the mills and shops had shut down, and Brookeville remained a residential town. In 1915, the Bentley family sold the Madison House to Roger Brooke, a leader of the Quaker community. The house later changed hands, owned for some time by Elisha Hall, a principal at the Brookeville Academy, banker Remus Riggs, and Gene Archer, an NBC television personality.

The automobile gave people more mobility and changed the market, with the nearby town of Olney taking prominence over Brookeville. Since the 1950s, Olney has rapidly developed, putting pressure on Brookeville. The Brookeville Historic District was placed on the National Register of Historic Places in 1979. Brookeville's historic designation has helped it retain historic character.

== Geography ==
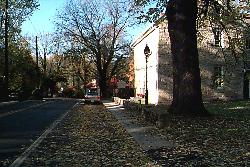
North on Georgia Ave into Brookeville, 2006

Brookeville is located in northeastern Montgomery County, Maryland, 3 miles (5 km) west of the Patuxent River and the Howard County border. The town is 2 miles (3 km) north of Olney and 20 miles (32 km) north of downtown Washington, D.C. The Town of Brookeville is formally incorporated, and covers an area of 0.1 square miles (0.26 km^{2}). Areas beyond the formal town boundaries, extending to the Howard County boundary, use Brookeville mailing addresses, falling within the 20833 ZIP Code. Located within the ZIP Code are the small hamlets of Sunshine and Brighton. Georgia Avenue (Maryland Route 97), which is a major north–south route through this part of Maryland, passes through the town. Brookeville Road connects the town with Laytonsville and other areas to the west. Brighton Dam Road extends to the east, crossing New Hampshire Avenue (Maryland Route 650), then the Patuxent River, and into Howard County.

Georgia Avenue, which begins in Washington, D.C., is a two-lane road when it passes through Brookeville, with a stop sign and tight turn that takes it through the historic district. In 1989, the road carried 8,000 vehicles daily, a number which had increased to 18,000 vehicles each weekday as of 2007. The traffic mainly consists of commuters from Carroll County and Howard County. The traffic volume on Georgia Avenue is more than the road was designed to handle. Brookeville residents have advocated for a bypass road to be constructed, to take traffic around the town. The bypass road around the town was in the planning stages for some time, since being recommended by county planning officials in 1966. The bypass road will include two roundabouts, one on either side of the town. The project was under construction as of May 2019 and was nearly complete by the fall of 2022.

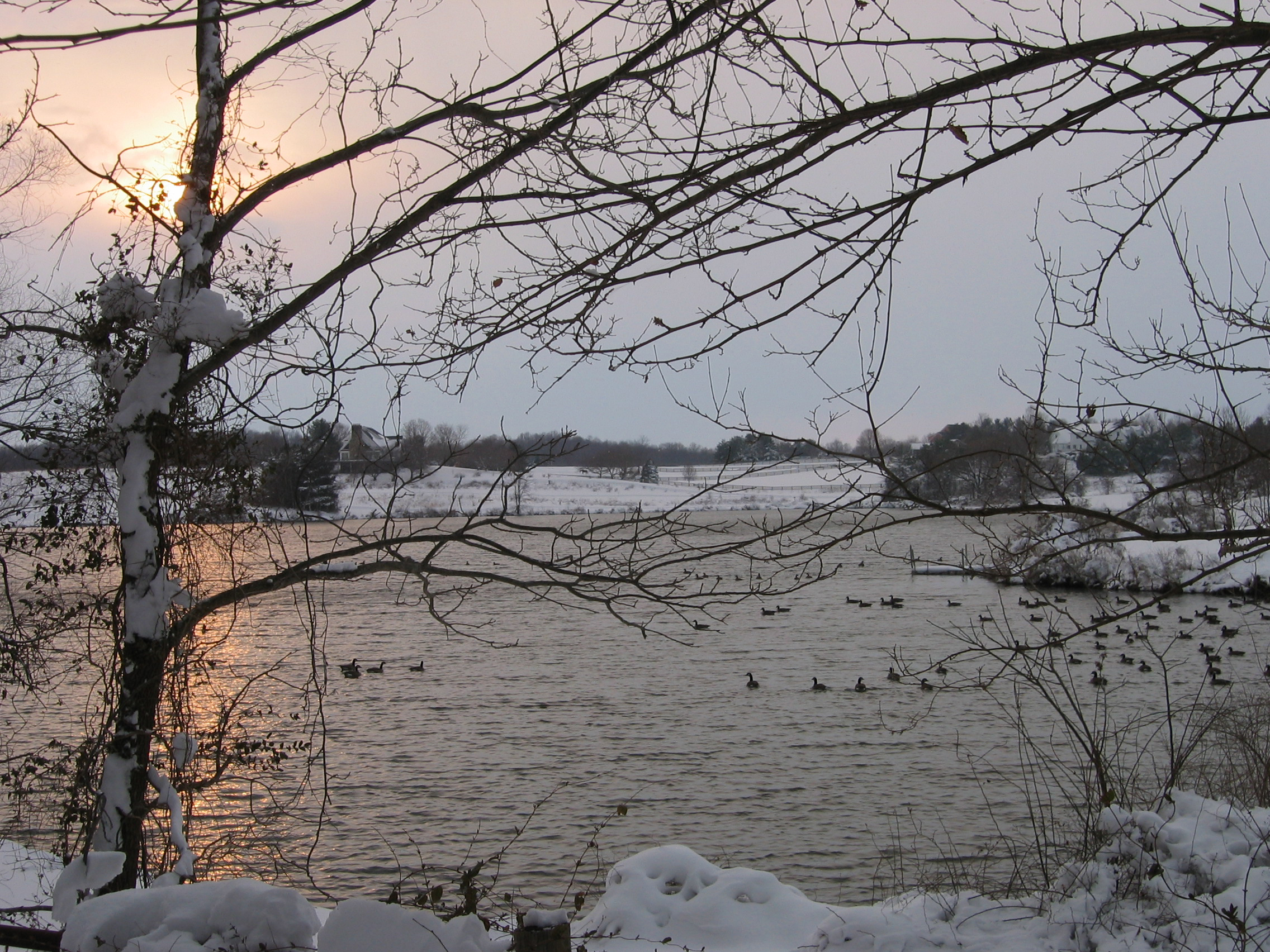
Rachel Carson Conservation Park

Reddy Branch flows along the northern and eastern edges of the town. It is a tributary of the Hawlings River, which flows east to the Patuxent River downstream from the Triadelphia Reservoir. Reddy Branch Stream Valley Park is located along Brookeville Road, to the west of the town, and to the east along Brighton Dam Road. Hawling Hills Park and Patuxent River State Park are located along New Hampshire Avenue, north of Ashton and to the east of Brookeville. Patuxent River State Park is used for hunting, fishing, hiking and horseback riding. Rachel Carson Conservation Park, located to the north, is undeveloped and has a number of hiking trails. The Triadelphia Reservoir, created by the Brighton Dam, is located on the Patuxent River. The Washington Suburban Sanitary Commission maintains 6,000 acres (24 km^{2}), in and around the reservoir, which are open to the public for recreational purposes. The reservoir is a popular recreation spot that is suitable for fishing, kayaking, and other activities. Mount Zion Park is a small park with playgrounds, ball fields, tennis courts, and picnic facilities. Within the town limits, Powers' Woods Park is a new 2-acre (8,100 m^{2}) park that is slated to be located near a recently restored one-room schoolhouse.

=== Climate ===
The climate in this area is characterized by hot, humid summers and generally mild to cool winters. According to the Köppen Climate Classification system, Brookeville has a humid subtropical climate, abbreviated "Cfa" on climate maps.

== Demographics ==
Historical population
Census	Pop.	Note	%±
1880	206		—
1900	158		—
1910	132		−16.5%
1920	79		−40.2%
1930	112		41.8%
1940	262		133.9%
1950	117		−55.3%
1960	140		19.7%
1970	136		−2.9%
1980	120		−11.8%
1990	54		−55.0%
2000	120		122.2%
2010	134		11.7%
2020	166		23.9%
U.S. Decennial Census

=== 2010 census ===
As of the census of 2010, there were 134 people, 54 households, and 38 families residing in the town. The population density was 1,116.7 inhabitants per square mile (431.2/km^{2}). There were 57 housing units at an average density of 475.0 per square mile (183.4/km^{2}). The racial makeup of the town was 88.8% White, 1.5% Asian, 4.5% from other races, and 5.2% from two or more races. Hispanic or Latino of any race were 11.2% of the population.

There were 54 households, of which 33.3% had children under the age of 18 living with them, 66.7% were married couples living together, 1.9% had a female householder with no husband present, 1.9% had a male householder with no wife present, and 29.6% were non-families. 22.2% of all households were made up of individuals, and 9.3% had someone living alone who was 65 years of age or older. The average household size was 2.48 and the average family size was 2.95.

The median age in the town was 46.3 years. 22.4% of residents were under the age of 18; 4.4% were between the ages of 18 and 24; 20.9% were from 25 to 44; 38% were from 45 to 64; and 14.2% were 65 years of age or older. The gender makeup of the town was 53.7% male and 46.3% female.

=== 2000 census ===
As of the 2000 census, the town had a population of 120; there were 44 households, out of which 38.6% had children under the age of 18 living with them, 52.3% were married couples living together, 11.4% had a female householder with no husband present, and 31.8% were non-families. 18.2% of all households were made up of individuals, and 9.1% had someone living alone who was 65 years of age or older. The population density was 933.6 inhabitants per square mile (360.5/km^{2}). The racial makeup of the town was 97.50% White, 0.83% from other races, and 1.67% from two or more races. Hispanic or Latino of any race were 2.50% of the population. The median age was 39 years. The median income for a household in the town was $88,629, and the median income for a family was $93,444. The per capita income for the town was $43,483. There were 7.1% of families and 5.5% of the population living below the poverty line.

The larger area defined as Brookeville by the postal service, within the 20833 ZIP Code, has a population of 6,259 as of the 2000 census. The median age is 37.5, and the racial composition is 84.1% Caucasian, 6.7% African-American, 6% Asian, and 3.6% Hispanic. The Brookeville area has a very high rate of home ownership, with 93.3% of its 2,063 households owning homes, which compares to a national average of 66.2% for home ownership. A large portion of the homes in Brookeville were built during the 1990s, as well as a large number built in the 1970s. As reported in the 2000 census, 30% of homes within the Brookeville ZIP Code were built during the 1990s, 15.6% during the 1980s, 35.6% in the 1970s, 13% between 1940 and 1970, and 5.7% before 1940. 54% of the population had moved into their homes during the 1990s, 22.9% in the 1980s, 17.5% in the 1970s, and 5.6% have lived in the same home since before 1970. The median purchase price for homes in the Brookeville area in 2006 was $546,500, which compares to $475,000 for all of Montgomery County, and $243,750 for the entire United States.

The population in the Brookeville area is well-educated, with 57.6% of those age 25 or older having a college education, which compares to the national average of 24.4%. The median household income is $103,879, compared to a national average of $41,994. Per capita income is $40,540 compared to $21,587 for all of the United States. 76.2% of the population over age 16 is in the labor force. Average commuting time is 35.9 minutes, with 84.1% driving alone, 9% carpooling, 2.3% using public transportation, and 3.1% working at home. Most people are employed in management, professional, and related occupations, with 59.5% in those types of jobs. 19.3% are employed in sales and office occupations, 10.7% in service occupations, 5.7 in construction, extraction, and maintenance occupations, and 4.9% in production, transportation, and material moving occupations. 24.4% of those in the labor force are government workers.

== Government ==
Brookeville was incorporated as a town in 1808 and the charter formally issued in 1890. Town commissioners oversee the government, handling street maintenance and other matters, as well as town planning. The town adopted a Historic Preservation Ordinance in 1986, which guides town planning and restricts development within the town. The town commission consists of three members, who are elected for two-year terms. Michael Acierno was elected in May 2007 as president of the Brookeville Town Commission.

Brookeville is represented in the Maryland House of Delegates by District 14 representatives, Anne Kaiser (D), Pamela E. Queen (D), and Bernice Mireku-North (D). Craig Zucker (D) represents Brookeville in the Maryland State Senate. Brookeville is located in Maryland's 8th congressional district, which is represented in the United States Congress by Jamie Raskin (D).

== Education ==
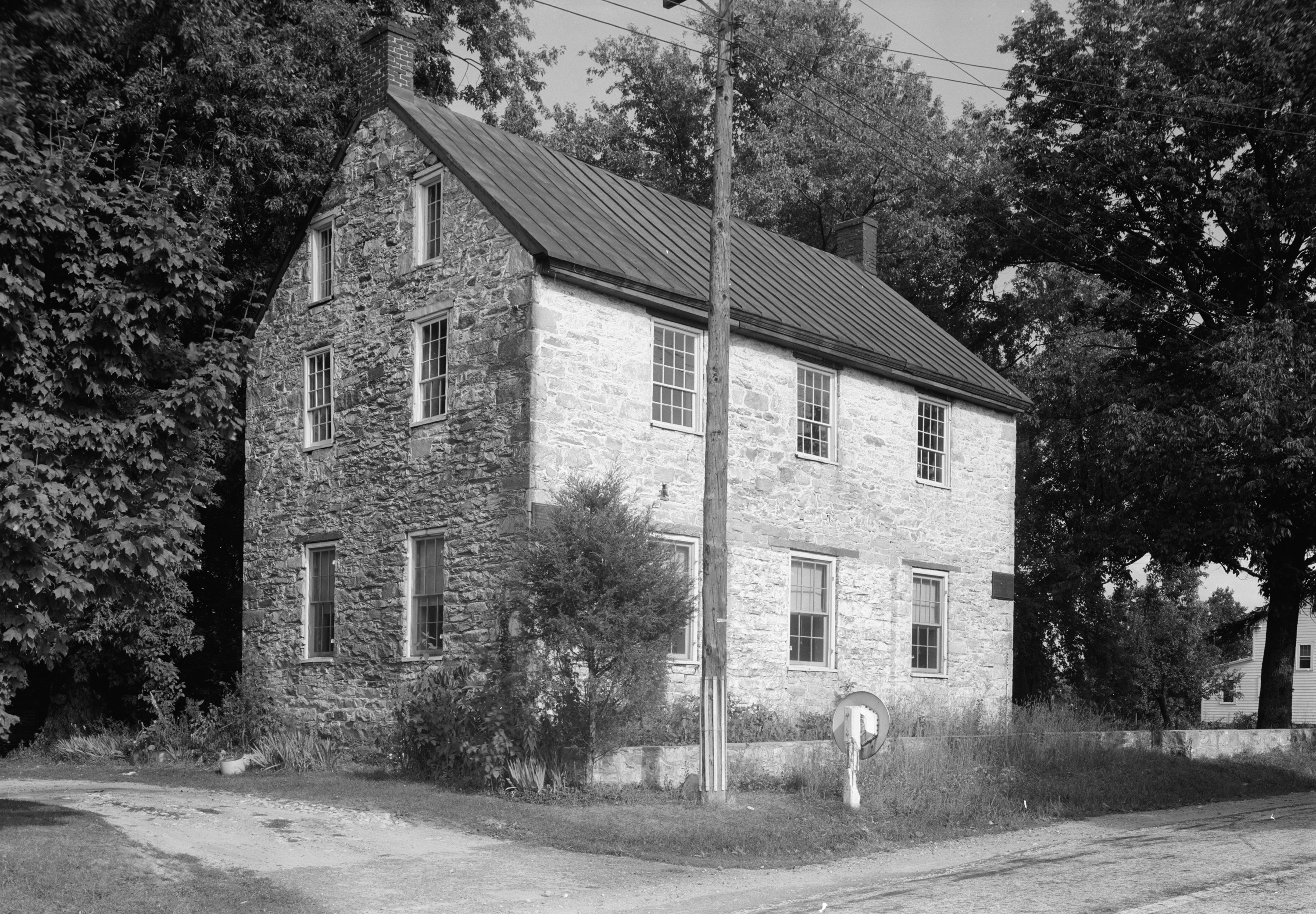
Brookeville Academy

The Brookeville Academy, a preparatory school established in 1814, was one of the first schools in the county. Among those educated at the academy, include Dr. Henry Howard, who established Howard County, and William Edward Magruder, great-grandson of Colonel Zadok Magruder. In 1869, the Brookeville Academy relocated to Merrywood, located on nearby farmland outside of town. The original building has since been used as a meeting facility by the American Legion and other organizations. On June 2, 1909, the Public School Board took over running the school. In 1988, the original building was sold to the Town of Brookeville, which maintains the building as a historic site and use for events.

The Longwood School for Boys was a private school that was established in 1946 by George F. Kimmell, who had bought Longwood Manor. In 1952, Kimmell leased the school facilities to the Civil Defense Administration, which used it for military training. The school was vacated in 1963, and remained vacant until 1978, when it was converted into a community recreation center. The Longwood Recreation Center is run by the Montgomery County Recreation Department.

Brookeville is now part of the Montgomery County Public Schools system, and is served by Sherwood High School, which first opened in 1883 as a Friends school and became a public school in 1909. Most of Brookeville, including the town proper, is located in the service area for Rosa Parks Middle School and Greenwood Elementary School. Some areas, bordering Howard County, are located the service area for William H. Farquhar Middle School and Sherwood Elementary School. Up until 1992, when Rosa Parks Middle School opened, all of Brookeville was within the Farquhar service area.

== Transportation ==
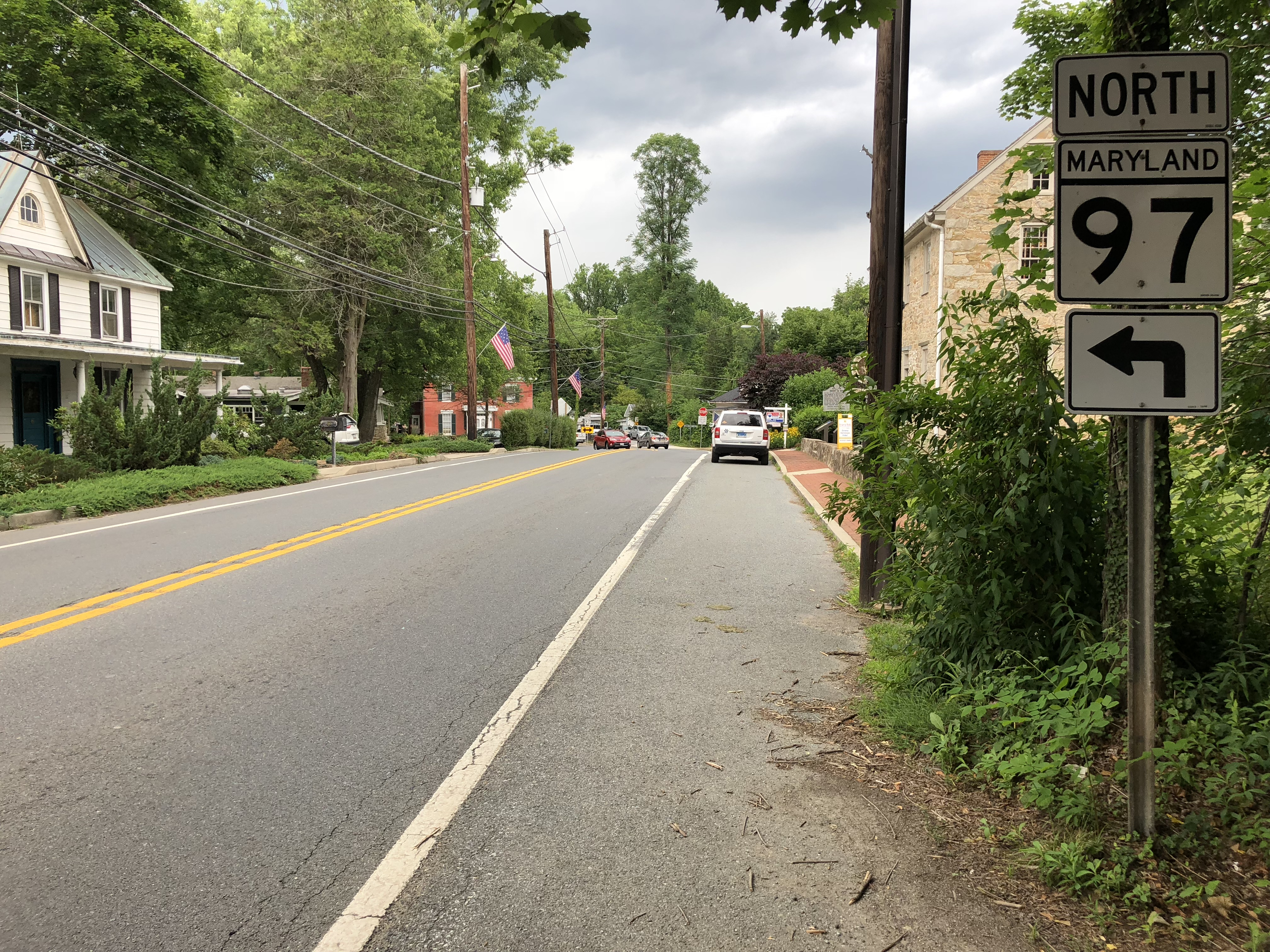
MD 97 northbound in Brookeville, just before turning left from High Street onto Market Street

Maryland Route 97 is the only state highway serving Brookeville directly. MD 97 follows High Street and Market Street within the town limits, becoming known as Georgia Avenue outside of town both to the north and south. After departing Brookeville, MD 97 heads north 10 miles (16 km) to a junction with Interstate 70 and U.S. Route 40 on its way to Westminster, while 12 miles (19 km) to the south, it intersects Interstate 495 before ending at U.S. Route 29 just outside of Washington, D.C. The name "Georgia Avenue" follows US 29 south into the city.

== Notable people ==
- Patrick D. Gallagher (born 1969), chancellor of the University of Pittsburgh; resided in Brookville for 20 years while working at NIST
- Karen S. Montgomery (born 1935), former member of the Maryland State Senate; resides in Brookeville
- Scott Van Pelt (born 1966), sportscaster for ESPN; born in Brookeville
- Craig Zucker (born 1975), member of the Maryland State Senate; resides in Brookeville
