= Brookeville Academy =

Coordinates: 39°10′48.9″N 77°3′30.75″W

The Brookeville Academy
- Brookeville, Maryland; USA

Information
- Website: Official site
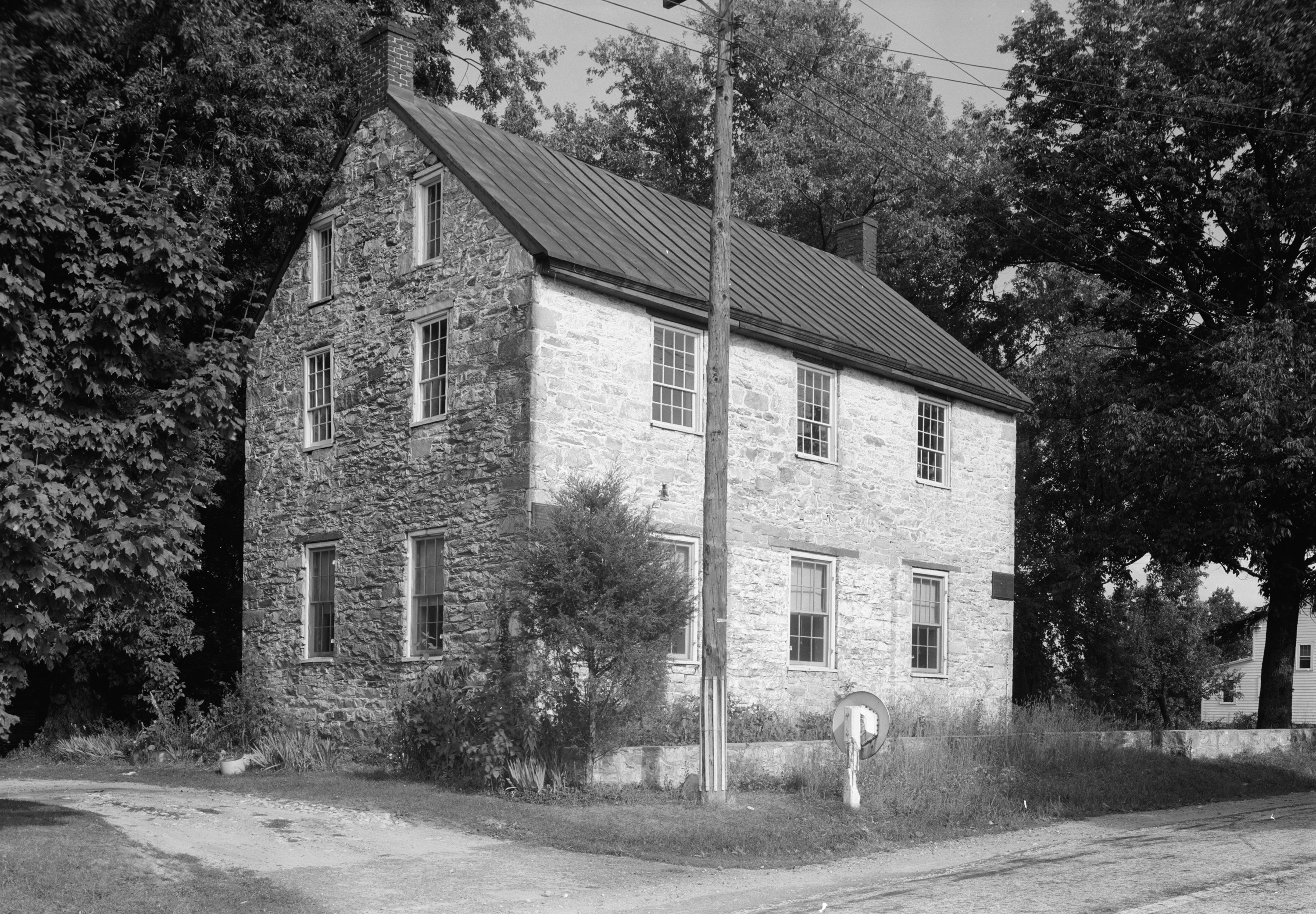
- The school house in 1936

The Brookeville Academy is located in the heart of the Historic District in Brookeville, Maryland, a town located twenty miles (32 km) north of Washington, D.C., and two miles (3.2 km) north of Olney in northeastern Montgomery County, Maryland. It was built in 1810 as one of the first private schools in Montgomery County, Maryland. Now, fully restored, it serves as a unique community center suitable for meetings, social and cultural events. It is located in the Brookeville Historic District, which served as the "Capital for a Day" in 1814 when President Madison had to flee the White House during the British Invasion of the War of 1812.

== The original building ==
The institution of the Brookville Academy was established in 1808 and was chartered in 1815. Construction for the building began in 1810. The second story of the structure was added in 1840 when the board of trustees decided to expand the school. It was completed in 1858.

== Notable students ==
Among those educated at the academy, include Dr. Henry Howard, who established Howard County, and William Edward Magruder, great-grandson of Colonel Zadok Magruder. In 1869, the Brookeville Academy relocated to Merrywood, located on nearby farmland outside of town.

== Present day ==
In 1868, the Brookeville Academy moved north to Merryville. After the move, the building had many uses. In the 1870s, the building served as Odd Fellows Hall. In the mid 1900s, it served as the American Legion Hall and also housed functions of Saint John's Church. The town of Brookeville purchased the house from the St. John's Church for its historical significance and began to renovate it for wider public use. The Brookeville Academy now serves as a community center, hosting private functions including meetings, seminars, dinners, parties and weddings.
