= Burning of Washington =

1814 British attack on the United States

- Part of the War of 1812
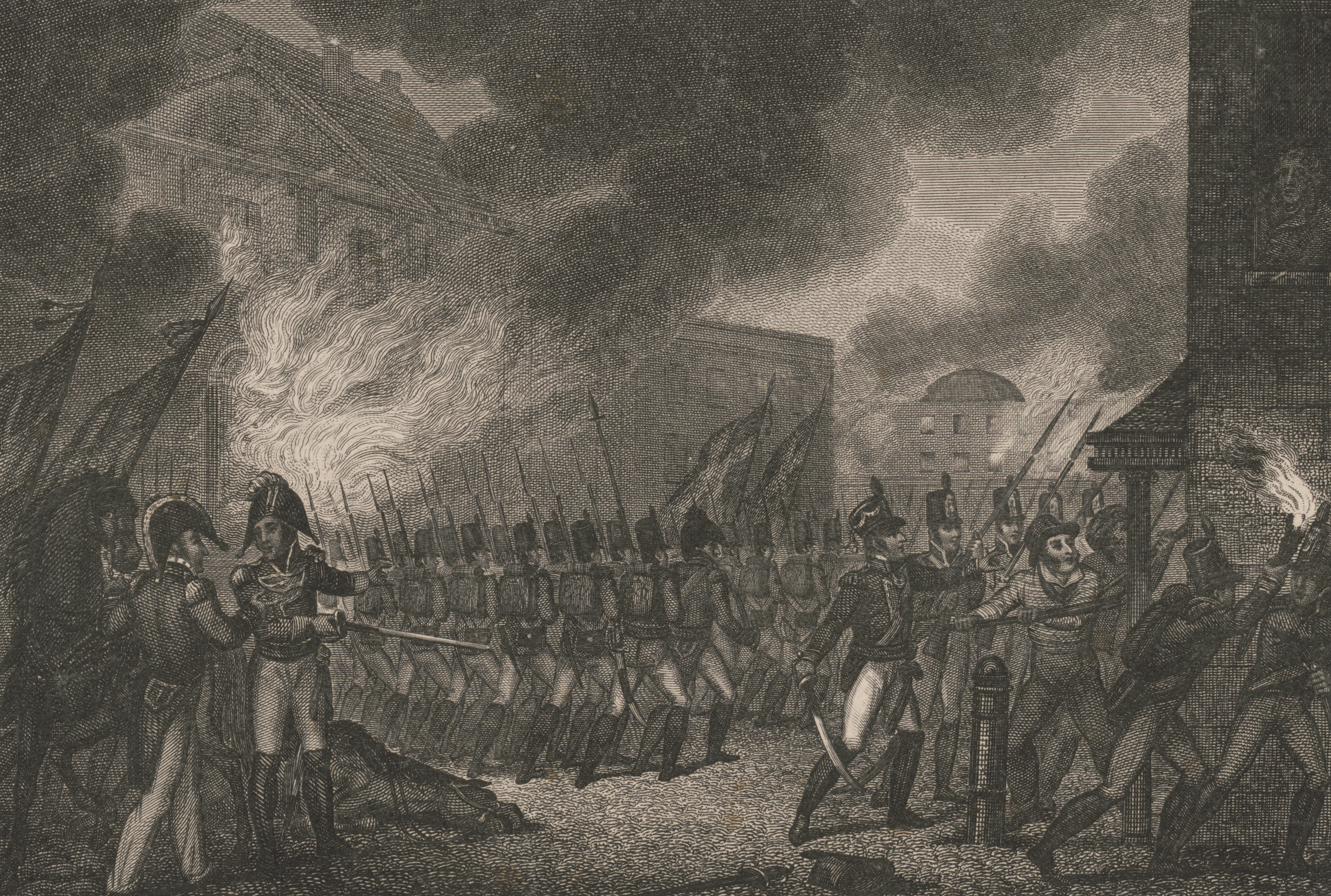
- 1815 illustration of the occupation
- Location: Washington; 38°53′23″N 77°00′32″W
- Commanded by: George Cockburn; Robert Ross
- Objective: Occupy Washington and burn federal buildings
- Date: August 24, 1814
- Executed by: United Kingdom
- Outcome: British victory
- Location within the District of Columbia

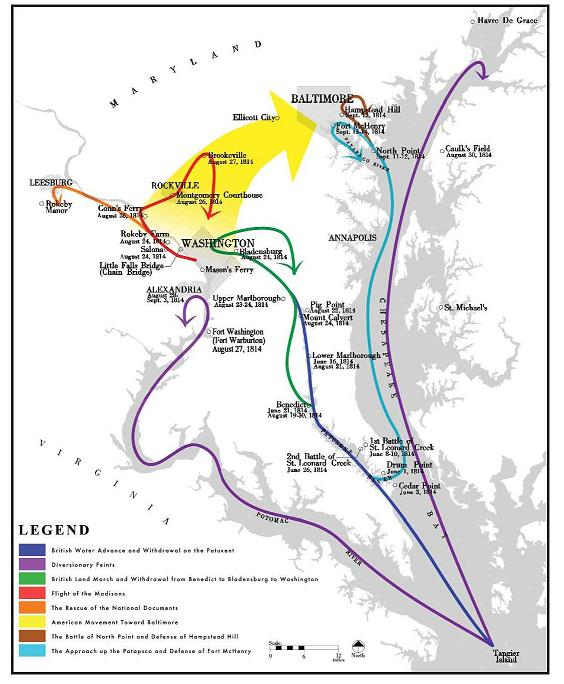
British and American movements during the Chesapeake Campaign in 1814

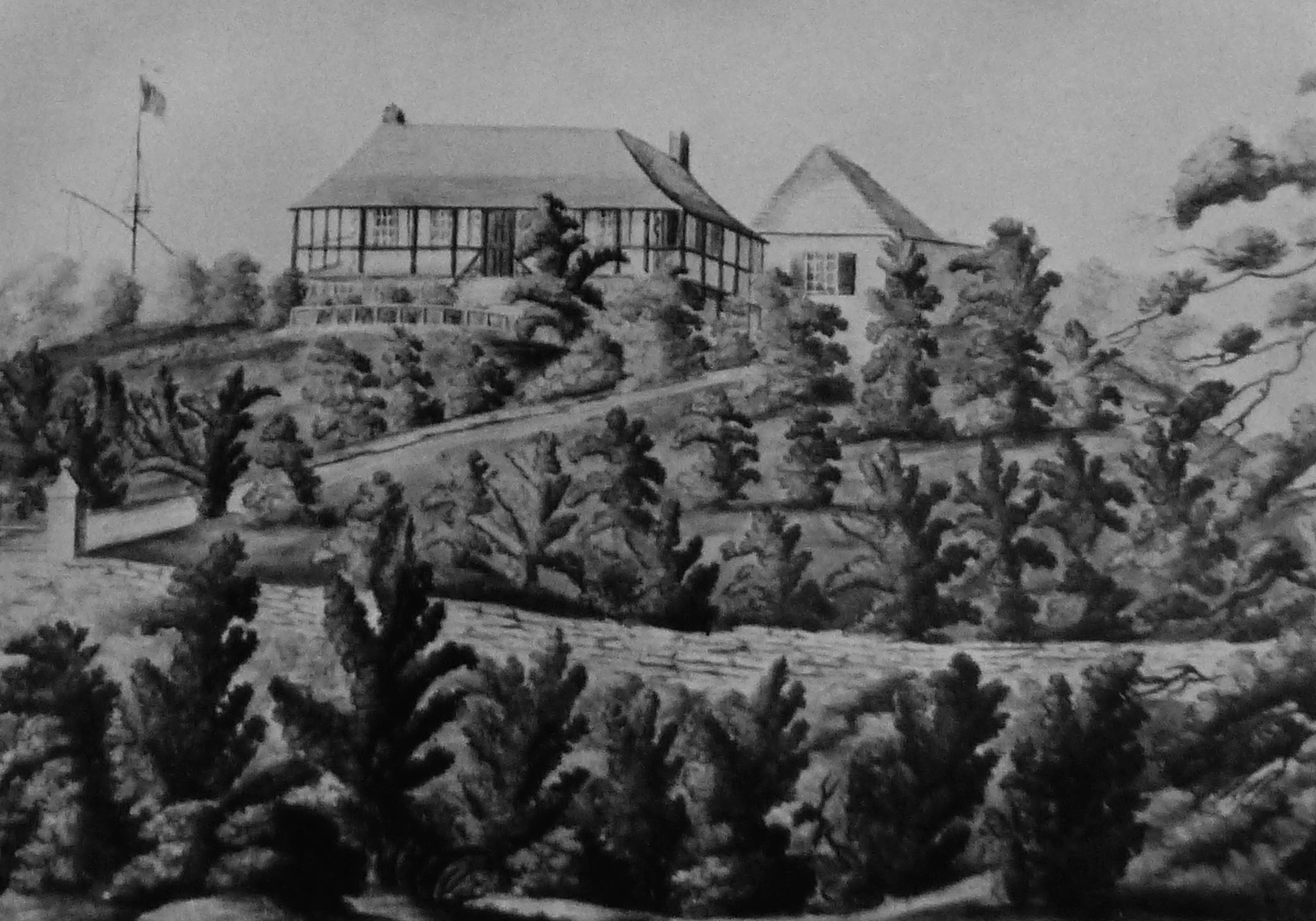
Admiralty House in Bermuda, where the British attack was planned

The burning of Washington, also known as the capture of Washington, was a successful British amphibious attack conducted by Rear Admiral George Cockburn as part of the Chesapeake campaign planned by Admiral John Warren. It was the only time since the American Revolutionary War that a foreign power had captured and occupied a United States capital. Following the defeat of American forces at the Battle of Bladensburg on August 24, 1814, a British force led by Major-General Robert Ross marched on Washington, D.C. That evening, British soldiers and sailors set fire to multiple public buildings, including the presidential mansion (White House), United States Capitol, and Washington Navy Yard.

The attack was in part a retaliation for American actions during the previous year in British-held Upper Canada, in which U.S. forces burned and looted York and then burned large portions of Port Dover. Less than four hours after the attack began, a heavy thunderstorm, possibly a hurricane and a tornado, extinguished the fires and caused further destruction. The British occupation of Washington, D.C., lasted for roughly 26 hours.

President James Madison, along with his administration and several military officials, evacuated and found refuge for the night in Brookeville, a small town in Montgomery County, Maryland; Madison spent the night in the house of Caleb Bentley, a Quaker who lived and worked in Brookeville. Bentley's house, known today as the Madison House, still exists.

== Background ==
The United Kingdom was already at war with France when the United States declared war in 1812. The war against France took up most of Britain's attention and military resources. The initial British strategy against the United States focused on imposing a naval blockade at sea, and maintaining a defensive stance on land. The British Army could not reinforce Canada; instead, the government relied on militia units and indigenous allies to support the British Army units already posted in Canada. With the defeat and exile of Napoleon in April 1814, Britain was able to use its newly available troops and ships to prosecute its war with the United States. The Earl Bathurst, serving as Secretary of State for War and the Colonies, dispatched an army brigade and additional naval vessels to the imperial fortress of Bermuda, from where a blockade of the U.S. coast and even the occupation of some coastal islands had been overseen throughout the war. It was decided to use these forces in raids along the Atlantic seaboard to draw American forces away from Canada.

The commanders were under strict orders not to carry out operations far inland, or to attempt to hold territory. Early in 1814, Vice-Admiral Alexander Cochrane had been appointed commander-in-chief of the Royal Navy's North America and West Indies Station, controlling naval forces based at the new Bermuda Dockyard and the Halifax Naval Yard, which were used to blockade American ports throughout the war. He planned to carry the war into the United States, by attacks in Virginia and against New Orleans. Rear-Admiral George Cockburn commanded the squadron in Chesapeake Bay since the previous year. On June 25, he wrote to Cochrane stressing that the defenses there were weak, and he felt that several major cities were vulnerable to attack.

Cochrane suggested attacking Baltimore, Washington, D.C., and Philadelphia. Cockburn accurately predicted that "within a short period of time, with enough force, we could easily have at our mercy the capital".

He recommended Washington, D.C., as the target, because of the comparative ease of attacking the national capital and "the greater political effect likely to result". On July 18, Cochrane ordered Cockburn to "deter the enemy from a repetition of similar outrages ... You are hereby required and directed to destroy and lay waste such towns and districts as you may find assailable". Cochrane further instructed, "You will spare merely the lives of the unarmed inhabitants of the United States". Ross was less optimistic. He "never dreamt for one minute that an army of 3,500 men with 1,000 marines reinforcement, with no cavalry, hardly any artillery, could march 50 miles inland and capture an enemy capital", according to historian John McCavitt. Ross refused to accept Cockburn's recommendation to burn the entire city. He spared nearly all of the privately owned properties.

An added motive was retaliation for the "wanton destruction of private property along the north shores of Lake Erie" by American troops under Colonel John Campbell in May, the most notable being the Raid on Port Dover. On June 2, Sir George Prevost, Governor General of British North America, wrote to Cochrane at Admiralty House, in Bailey's Bay, Bermuda, calling for a retaliation against the American destruction of private property in violation of the laws of war. Prevost argued that,

in consequence of the late disgraceful conduct of the American troops in the wanton destruction of private property on the north shores of Lake Erie, in order that if the war with the United States continues you may, should you judge it advisable, assist in inflicting that measure of retaliation which shall deter the enemy from a repetition of similar outrages.

Many sources also suggest that the attack on Washington was motivated by revenge for the American looting of York in Upper Canada, the provincial capital, after the Battle of York in April 1813. Earlier, the British had filed general complaints about the "wanton destruction" along the Niagara region and Lake Erie. Major General Ross commanded the 4,500-man army in Washington, composed of the 1st Battalion, the 4th (King's Own) Regiment of Foot, the 21st (Royal North British Fusilier) Regiment of Foot, the 1st Battalion, the 44th (East Essex) Regiment of Foot, the 85th Regiment of Foot and a battalion of Royal Marines. This force defeated an American army at the Battle of Bladensburg.

== Burning ==
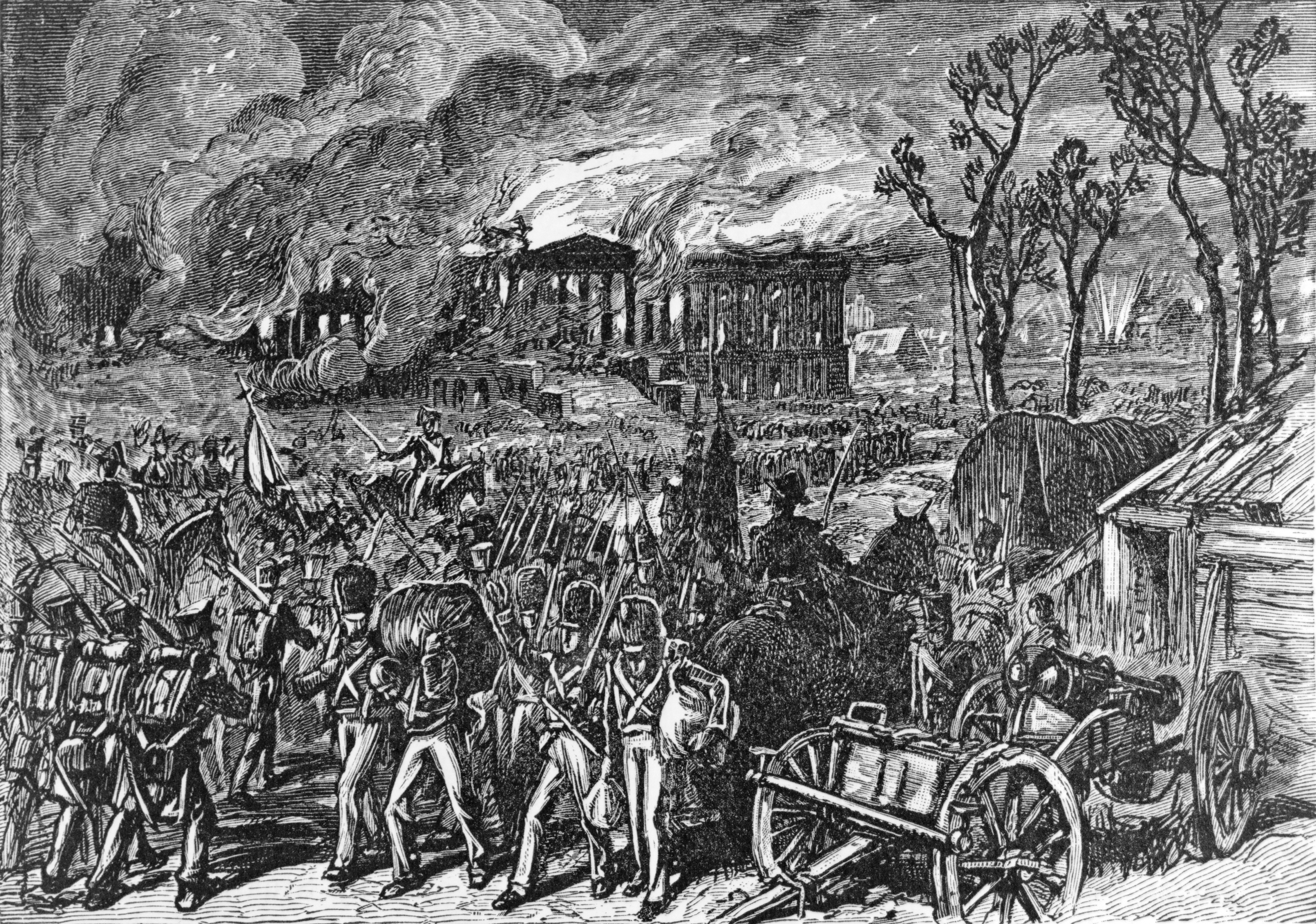
1876 woodcut print of the Burning of Washington

President James Madison, members of his government, and the military fled the city in the wake of the British victory at Bladensburg. They found refuge for the night in Brookeville, a small town in Montgomery County, Maryland, which is known today as the "United States' Capital for a Day". Madison spent the night in the house of Caleb Bentley, a Quaker who lived and worked as a silversmith in Brookeville. Bentley's house, known today as the Madison House, still stands in Brookeville.

On August 24, 1814, the British, led by Ross and Cockburn, entered Washington with a force of 4,500 "battle hardened" men. The plan to attack Washington had been formulated by Cockburn, who predicted that "within a short period of time, with enough force, we could easily have at our mercy the capital". Ross commanded the troops and was less optimistic. While Cockburn recommended burning the entire city, Ross planned to damage only public buildings.

Ross, who was described by historian John McCavitt as "an officer and a gentleman", initially planned for an orderly surrender of Washington. However, as he and his men entered the city under a flag of truce, American soldiers remaining in the city "treacherously" opened fire, wounding Ross' horse and killing two of his men. McCavitt argued that this led him to "reluctantly" order the burning of the White House and the Capitol building.

=== U.S. Capitol ===
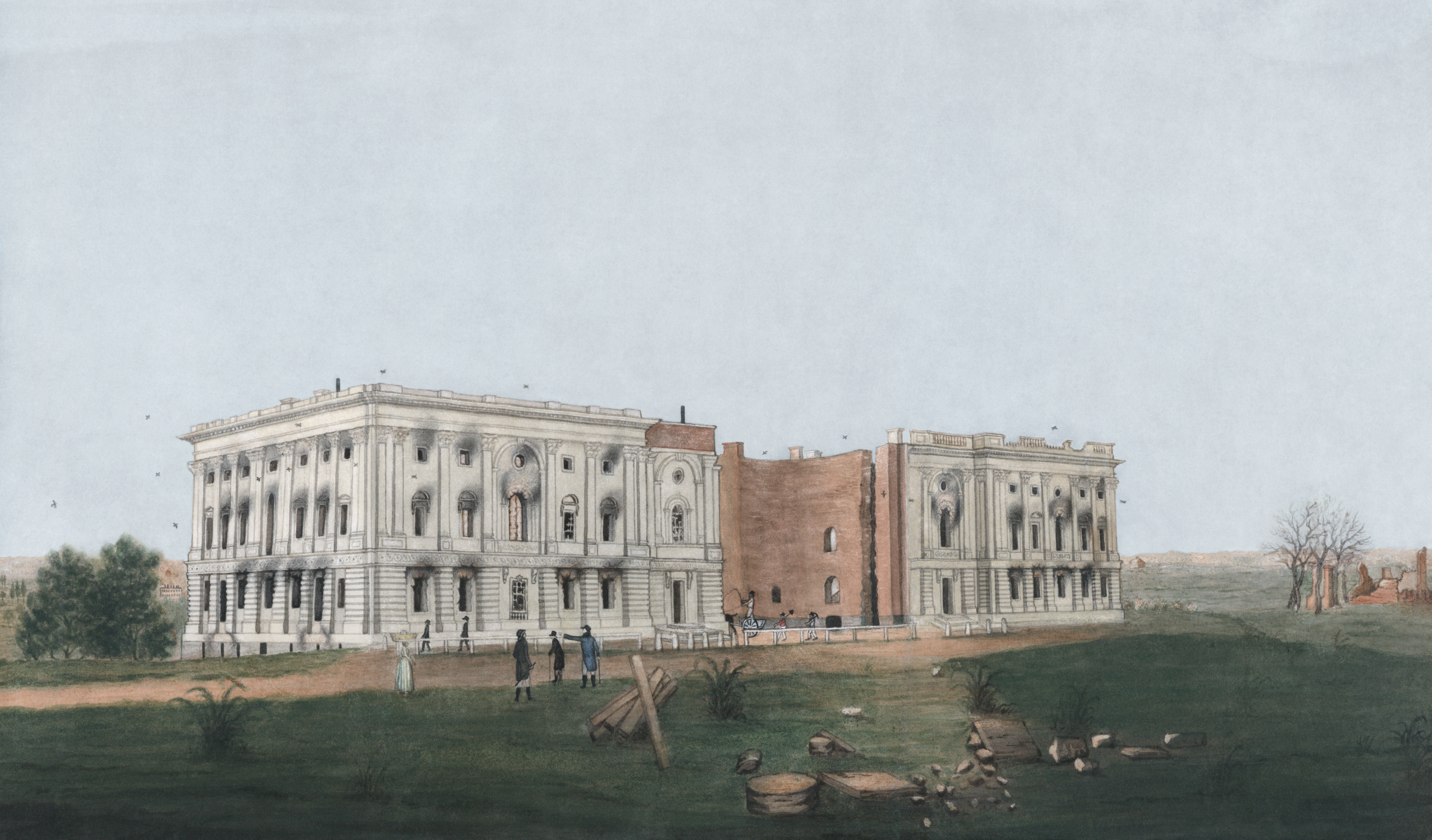
1814 watercolor of the Capitol following being burnt

The United States Capitol was, according to some contemporary travelers, the only building in Washington "worthy to be noticed". Thus, it was a prime target for the British, for both its aesthetic and its symbolic value. Upon arrival into the city via Maryland Avenue, the British targeted the Capitol, first the southern wing, containing the House of Representatives, then the northern wing, containing the Senate. Prior to setting it aflame, the British sacked the building, which at that time housed Congress, the Library of Congress, and the Supreme Court.

Items looted by troops led by Cockburn included a ledger entitled "An account of the receipts and expenditures of the United States for the year 1810"; the admiral wrote on the inside leaf that it was "taken in President's room in the Capitol, at the destruction of that building by the British, on the capture of Washington, 24th August, 1814". He later gave it to his elder brother Sir James Cockburn, the governor of Bermuda. The book was returned to the Library of Congress in 1940.

The British intended to burn the building to the ground. They set fire to the southern wing first. The flames grew so quickly that the British were prevented from collecting enough wood to burn the stone walls completely. However, the Library of Congress's contents in the northern wing contributed to the flames on that side. Among the items destroyed was the 3,000-volume collection of the Library of Congress and the intricate decorations of the neoclassical columns, pediments, and sculptures designed by William Thornton in 1793 and Benjamin Latrobe in 1803.

The wooden ceilings and floors burned and the glass skylights melted from the intense heat. The building was not a complete loss. The House rotunda, the east lobby, the staircases, and Latrobe's famous Corn-Cob Columns in the Senate entrance hall all survived. The superintendent of the public buildings of the City of Washington, Thomas Munroe, concluded that the loss to the Capitol amounted to $787,163.28 (equivalent to $12,088,579 in 2025), with $457,388.36 (equivalent to $7,024,178 in 2025) for the north wing and main building, and $329,774.92 (equivalent to $5,064,401 in 2025) for the south wing.

=== White House ===
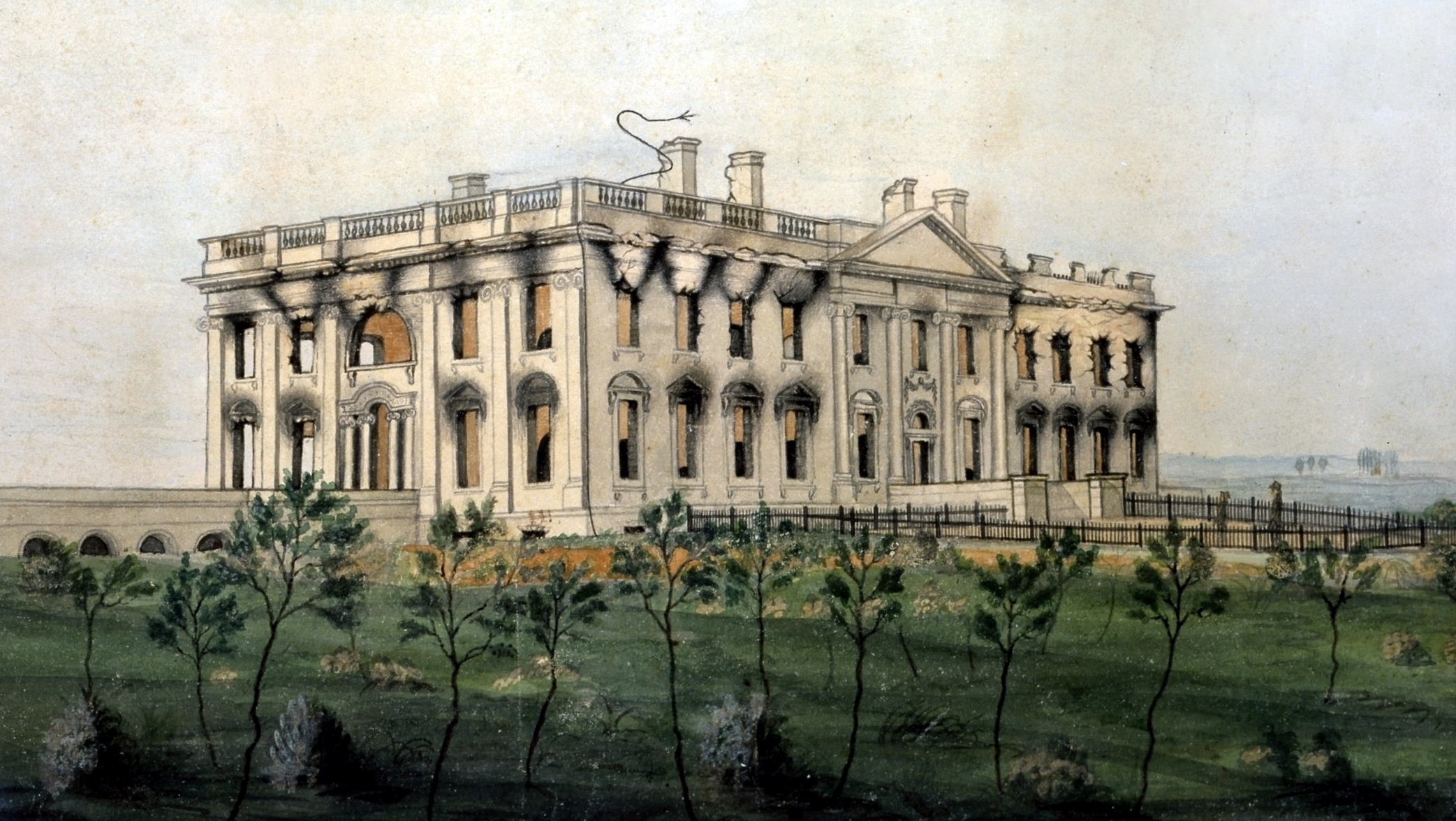
1814 watercolor of the White House after being burnt

Robert Ross, who commanded the army contingent of the force which occupied Washington

After burning the Capitol, the British turned northwest up Pennsylvania Avenue toward the White House. After U.S. government officials and Madison fled the city, First Lady Dolley Madison received a letter from her husband, urging her to be prepared to leave Washington at a moment's notice. Dolley organized the enslaved and other staff to save valuables from the British. (Note: Willets includes Dolley Madison's letter to her sister describing these events.) Madison's personal enslaved attendant, the fifteen-year-old boy Paul Jennings, was an eyewitness. After later buying his freedom from the widow Dolley Madison, Jennings published his memoir in 1865, considered the first from the White House:

It has often been stated in print, that when Mrs. Madison escaped from the White House, she cut out from the frame the large portrait of Washington (now in one of the parlors there), and carried it off. She had no time for doing it. It would have required a ladder to get it down. All she carried off was the silver in her reticule, as the British were thought to be but a few squares off, and were expected any moment.

Jennings said the people who saved the painting and removed the objects actually were:

John Susé (Jean Pierre Sioussat, the French door-keeper, and still living at the time of Jennings's memoir) and McGraw, [sic?] (Note: This is a probable misspelling. The White House Historical Association dentifies the gardener as Thomas McGrath.) the President's gardener, took it down and sent it off on a wagon, with some large silver urns and such other valuables as could be hastily got hold of. When the British did arrive, they ate up the very dinner, and drank the wines, &c., that I had prepared for the President's party.

The sappers and miners of the Corps of Royal Engineers under Captain Blanshard, who were employed in burning the government buildings, entered the White House. Blanshard reported that it seemed that Madison was so sure that the attacking force would be made prisoners of war that a handsome feast had been prepared. Blanshard and his sappers enjoyed it. The soldiers then burned the president's house, and fuel was added to the fires that night to ensure they would continue burning into the next day.

=== Other Washington buildings ===
The day after the destruction of the White House, Cockburn entered the building of the D.C. newspaper, the National Intelligencer, intending to burn it down. However, several women persuaded him not to because they were afraid the fire would spread to their neighboring houses. Cockburn wanted to destroy the newspaper because its reporters had written so negatively about him, branding him the "Ruffian". Instead, he ordered his troops to tear the building down brick by brick, and ordered all the "C" type destroyed "so that the rascals can have no further means of abusing my name".

The British sought out the United States Treasury in hopes of finding money or items of worth, but they found only old records. They burned the United States Treasury and other public buildings. The United States Department of War building was also burned. However, the War and State Department files had been removed, so the books and records had been saved; the only records of the War Department lost were recommendations of appointments for the Army and letters received from seven years earlier. The First U.S. Patent Office Building was saved by the efforts of William Thornton, the former architect of the Capitol and then the superintendent of patents, who gained British cooperation to preserve it. (Note: Brief History of the United States Patent Office from Its Foundation—1790 to 1886—with an Outline of Laws, Growth, Publications, Office Routine, Etc. Washington, D.C.: R. Beresford, Printer. 1886. Archived from the original on April 15, 2012. It is written that a loaded cannon was aimed at the patent office to destroy it. Thornton "put himself before the gun, and in a frenzy of excitement exclaimed: 'Are you Englishmen or only Goths and Vandals? This is the Patent Office, a depository of the ingenuity of the American nation, in which the whole civilized world is interested. Would you destroy it? If so, fire away, and let the charge pass through my body.' The effect is said to have been magical upon the soldiers, and to have saved the Patent Office from destruction.") "When the smoke cleared from the dreadful attack, the Patent Office was the only Government building ... left untouched" in Washington.

The Americans had already burned much of the Washington Navy Yard, established by the Jefferson administration, to prevent capture of stores and ammunition, as well as the 44-gun frigate USS Columbia and the 22-gun USS Argus, both new vessels nearing completion. The Navy Yard's Latrobe Gate, Quarters A, and Quarters B were the only buildings to escape destruction. Also spared were the Marine Barracks and Commandant's House, although several private properties were damaged or destroyed. In the afternoon of August 25, General Ross sent two hundred men to secure a fort on Greenleaf's Point. The fort, later known as Fort McNair, had already been destroyed by the Americans, but 150 barrels of gunpowder remained. While the British were trying to dispose of them by dropping them into a well, the powder ignited. As many as thirty British soldiers were killed in the explosion, with several others injured.

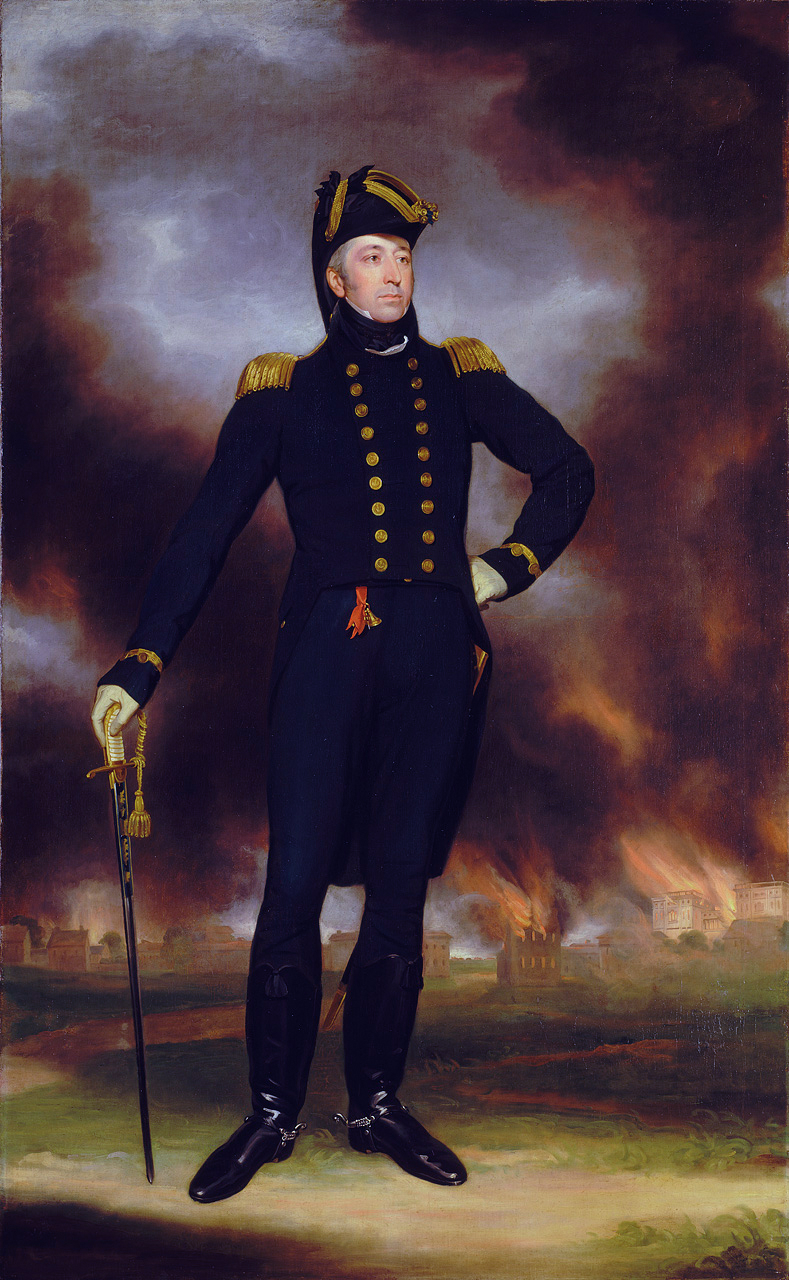
Portrait of Admiral Cockburn at the National Maritime Museum in Greenwich, London, with Washington, D.C., burning in the background, including the U.S. Capitol and Treasury Building on the right

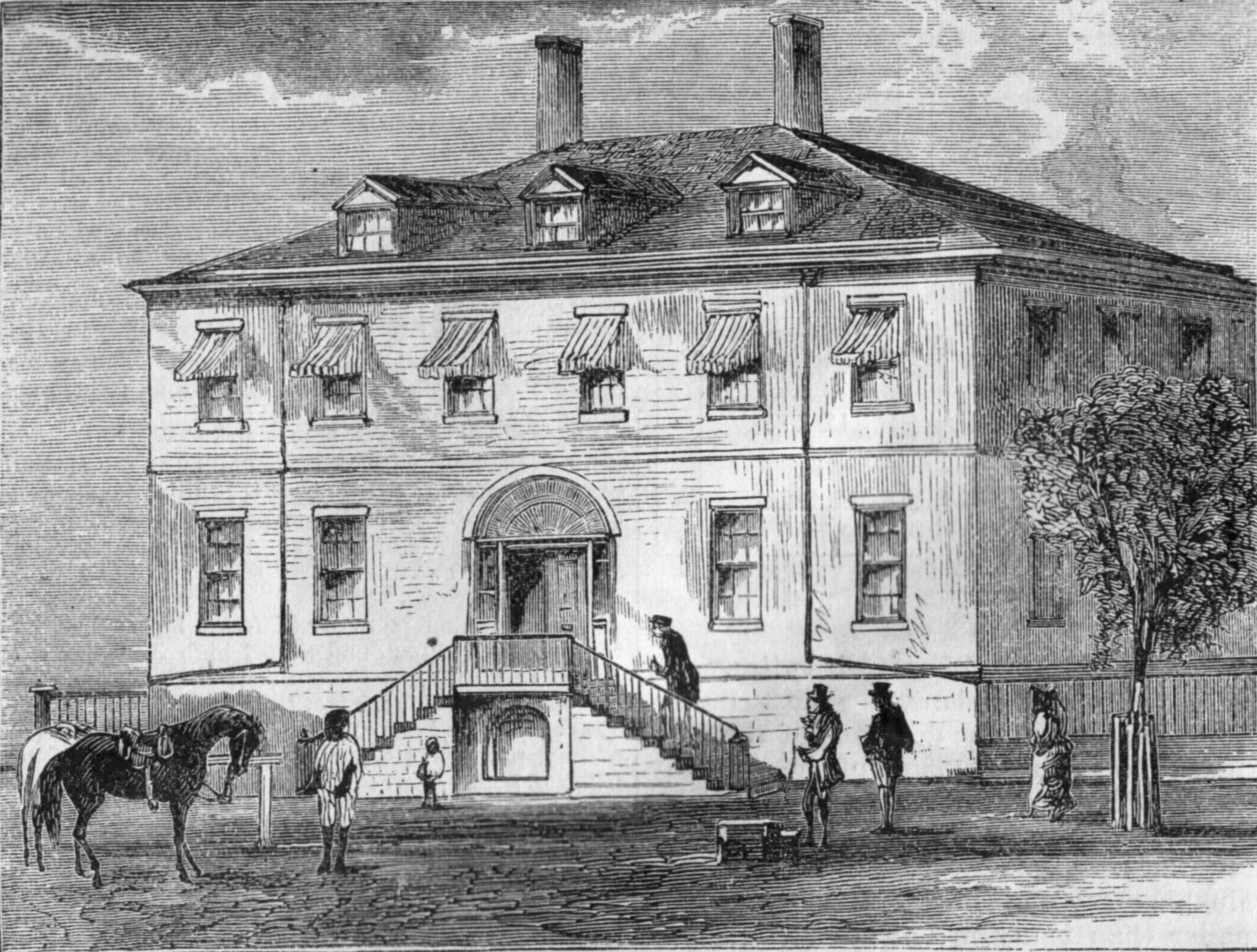
The U.S. Treasury Building (built 1804)

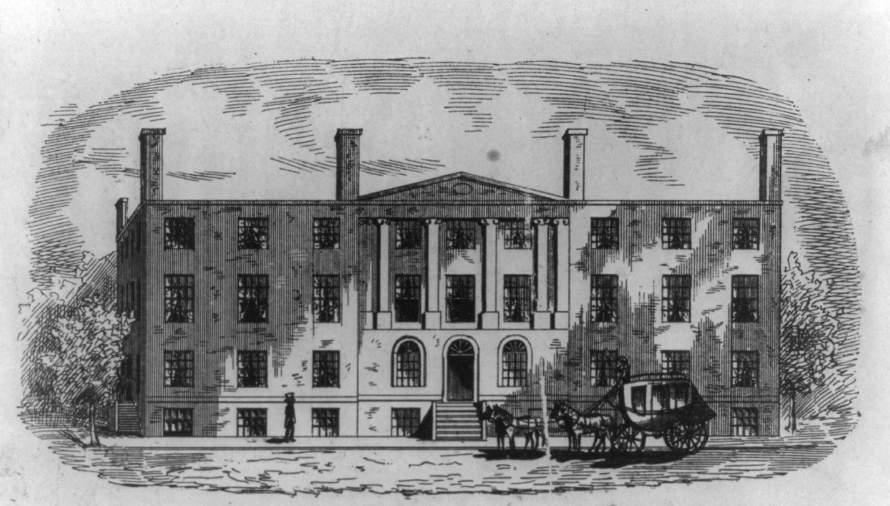
The Blodget Hotel, which housed the U.S. Patent Office; spared during the burning of Washington in 1814. The patent office later burned in 1836.

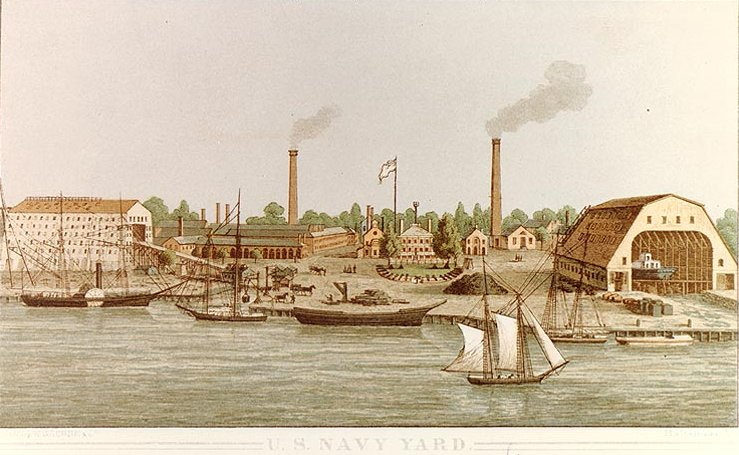
Washington Navy Yard in 1862

== "The Storm that Saved Washington" ==
Less than a day after the attack began, a sudden, very heavy thunderstorm—possibly a hurricane—put out the fires. It also spun off a tornado that passed through the center of the capital, setting down on Constitution Avenue and lifting two cannons before dropping them several yards away and killing British troops and American civilians alike. Following the storm, the British troops returned to their ships, many of which were badly damaged. There is some debate regarding the effect of this storm on the occupation. While some assert that the storm forced the British to retreat, historians have argued that their intention was only to destroy the city's government buildings, rather than occupy it for an extended period. It is also clear that Ross never intended to damage private buildings as had been recommended by Cockburn and Cochrane.

Whatever the case, the British occupation of Washington lasted only about 26 hours. Despite this, the "Storm that saved Washington", as it became known, did the opposite according to some. The rains sizzled and cracked the already charred walls of the White House and ripped away at structures the British had no plans to destroy (such as the Patent Office). The storm may have exacerbated an already dire situation for Washington D.C. An encounter was noted between Cockburn and a female resident of Washington. "Dear God! Is this the weather to which you are accustomed in this infernal country?" enquired the Admiral. "This is a special interposition of Providence to drive our enemies from our city", the woman allegedly called out to Cockburn. "Not so, Madam", Cockburn retorted. "It is rather to aid your enemies in the destruction of your city", before riding off on horseback.

The Royal Navy reported that it lost one man killed and six wounded in the attack, of whom the fatality and three of the wounded were from the Corps of Colonial Marines. The destruction of the Capitol, including the Senate House and the House of Representatives, the Arsenal, Dockyard, Treasury, War Office, President's mansion, bridge over the Potomac, a frigate and a sloop together with all materiel was estimated at £365,000 (equivalent to $5,605,357 in 2025). A separate British force captured Alexandria, Virginia, on the south side of the Potomac River, while Ross's troops were leaving Washington. The mayor of Alexandria made a deal and the British refrained from burning the town.

== Aftermath ==
Madison returned to Washington by August 28 and on September 1 issued a proclamation calling on American citizens to defend the District of Columbia. Congress did not return for three and a half weeks. When they did so, they assembled in a special session on September 19 in the Post and Patent Office building at Blodgett's Hotel, one of the few buildings spared from destruction that was large enough to hold all members of Congress. At the session, Madison gave a speech in which he denounced the "barbarous policy" of the British and claimed that they would "find [their] transient success, which interrupted for a moment only the ordinary public business at the seat of Government, no compensation for the loss of character for the world." He further promised the American national spirit was intact and British forces would suffer "disaster and expulsion".

The capture and burning of Washington was seen by most Americans as a national humiliation, and some feared the event made the United States into "an international laughingstock". In contrast, Thomas Jefferson argued in a letter he wrote to the Marquis de Lafayette that ultimately "the transaction has helped rather than hurt us by arousing the general indignation of our country, and marking to the world of Europe the vandalism and brutal character of the English Government. It has merely served to immortalize their infamy." Most contemporary American observers, including newspapers who supported the anti-war Federalist Party, condemned the destruction of federal buildings as needless vandalism. Jefferson wrote on September 21 that

I learn from the newspapers that the vandalism of our enemy has triumphed at Washington over science as well as the arts, by the destruction of the public library with the noble edifice in which it was deposited. Of this transaction, as that of Copenhagen, the world will entertain but one sentiment. They will see a nation suddenly withdrawn from a great war, full armed and full handed, taking advantage of another, whom they had recently forced into it; unarmed, and unprepared to indulge themselves in acts of barbarism which do not belong to a civilized age.

However, the Pennsylvanian physician and abolitionist Jesse Torrey argued in A Portraiture of Slavery in the United States (1817) that the burning was a divine punishment for American slavery:

Would it be superstitious to presume, that the Sovereign Father of all nations, permitted the perpetration of this apparently execrable transaction, as a fiery, though salutary signal of his displeasure at the conduct of his Columbian children, in erecting and idolizing this... temple of freedom, and at the same time oppressing with the yoke of captivity and toilsome bondage, twelve or fifteen hundred thousand of their African brethren... making merchandize of their blood, and dragging their bodies with iron chains, even under its towering walls?

The British public generally reacted to the burning of Washington by viewing it as justified retaliation for similar acts committed by American troops during their invasions of Canada. Furthermore, most Britons viewed the War of 1812 as an American war of aggression, which further justified the burnings in their view. Several British and Canadian commentators claimed the burnings were justified by acts of looting and destruction committed by American troops in April 1813 following their capture of York, the then-capital of Upper Canada. Prevost wrote that "as a just retribution, the proud capital at Washington has experienced a similar fate". John Strachan, who as rector of York had been present when the Americans captured the city, wrote to Jefferson on 30 January 1815 upon reading of his criticism of the burning of Washington that the damage to the US capital "was a small retaliation after redress had been refused for burnings and depredations, not only of public but private property, committed by [American troops] in Canada". Strachan further continued:

In April, 1813 the public buildings at York, the capital of Upper Canada, were burnt by troops of the United States, contrary to the articles of capitulation. They consisted of two elegant halls with convenient offices for the accommodation of the Legislature and of the Courts of Justice. The library and all the papers and records belonging to these institutions were consumed; at the same time the church was robbed and the town library totally pillaged. Commodore Chauncey, who has generally behaved honourably, was so ashamed of this last transaction that he endeavoured to collect the books belonging to the library and actually sent back two boxes filled with them, but hardly any were complete. Much private property was plundered and several houses left in a state of ruin. Can you tell me why the public buildings and the library at Washington should be held more sacred than those at York?

In contrast to the majority view, some of the British public opposed the burnings and in line with most Americans viewed them as unjustified destruction. The editors of the radical London newspaper Statesman proclaimed that "Willingly would we throw a veil of oblivion over our transactions at Washington. The Cossacks spared Paris, but we spared not the capital of America." The Annual Register claimed the burnings had "brought a heavy censure on the British character" and some members of Parliament, including the anti-establishment MP Samuel Whitbread, joined in the criticism, with Whitbread declaring that the Liverpool ministry was "making much of the taking of a few buildings in a non-strategic swamp, as though it had captured Paris". When they ultimately returned to Bermuda, British forces took with them two pairs of portraits of George III and Queen Charlotte which had been discovered in one of the federal buildings. One portrait currently hangs in the House of Assembly of Bermuda and the other in the Cabinet Building, both of which are located in the Bermudian capital of Hamilton.

Congress continued to meet in the Post and Patent Office until December 1815, when the Old Brick Capitol was completed and it began holding Congressional sessions there instead. Following Congress' return to Washington, a debate ensued over whether the American capital should be relocated elsewhere in light of the damage done to the city. Louisiana senator Eligius Fromentin was one of the most vocal advocates for moving the capital, giving a speech in which he claimed "what, in the present state of things, are our prospects for the future? Awful indeed. How many ages must elapse before this chaos is likely to assume anything like a describable shape?" New Hampshire representative Daniel Webster suggested that Congress could move back to Philadelphia. Madison resisted such suggestions and managed to ensure Congress remained in Washington in part by having Munroe report to Congress that the White House and Capitol both could be rebuilt.

== Reconstruction ==
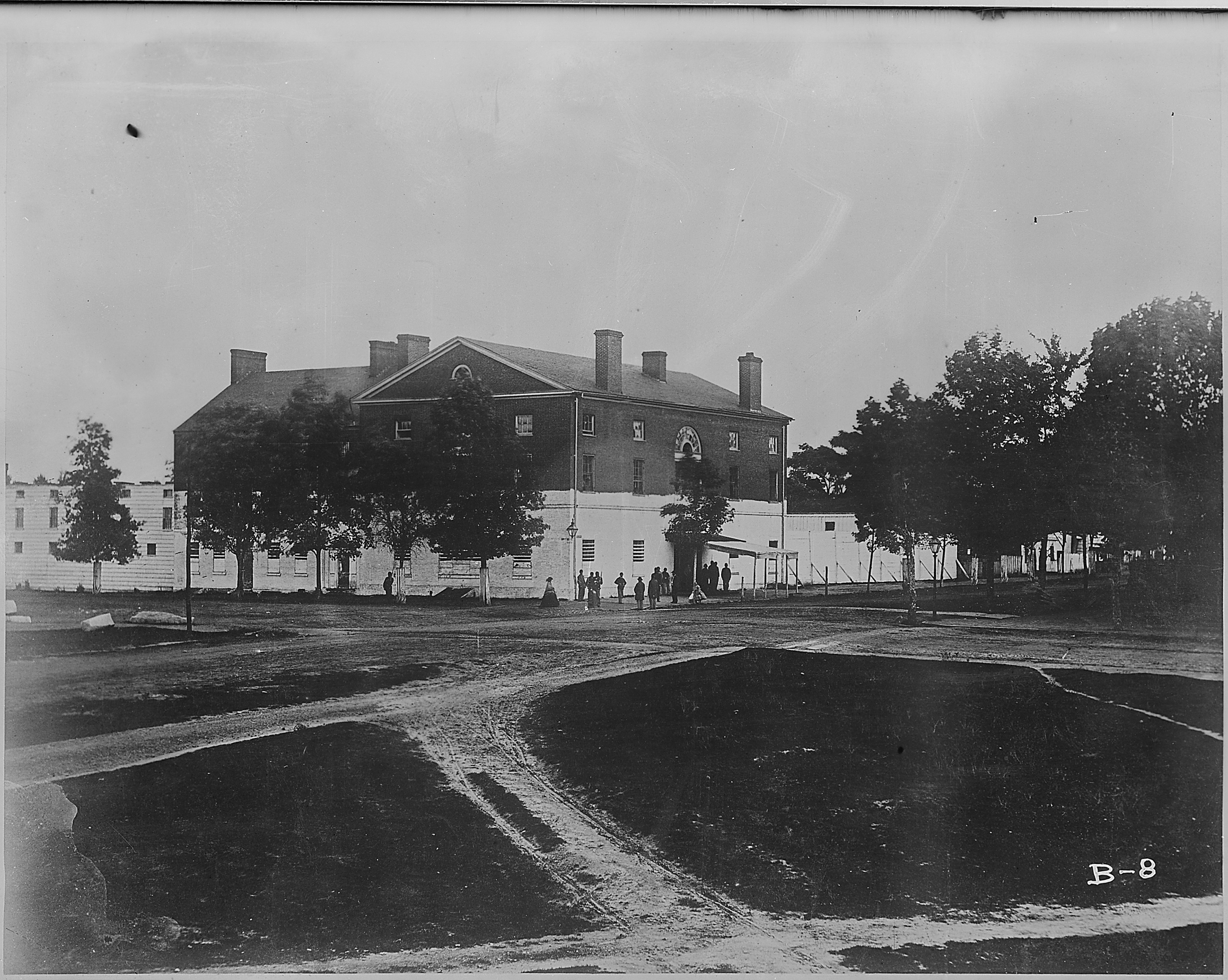
The Old Brick Capitol serving as a prison during the Civil War

There was a movement in Congress to relocate the capital after the burning. Congressmen from the north pushed for relocation to Philadelphia or some other prominent northern city, while Southern congressmen claimed that moving the capital would degrade the American sense of dignity and strength (however, many Southern congressmen simply did not want to move the capital north of the Mason–Dixon line). On September 21, the House of Representatives voted to strike down a proposal to relocate the capital from Washington, D.C. by a margin of 83 to 54.

On February 3, 1815, in an effort to guarantee that the federal government would always remain in the area, Washington property owners funded the building of the Old Brick Capitol, a larger meeting space where the Supreme Court now stands. Construction of the Old Brick Capitol cost $25,000 (equivalent to $439,773 in 2025) and was funded primarily through the sale of stocks. The largest donor was Daniel Carroll of Duddington, a rich English property owner in the area. Construction began on July 4, and concluded in December. Congress met in the Old Brick Capitol between December 1815 and December 1819, when the Capitol reopened.

The Capitol reconstruction took much longer than anticipated. The Old Brick Capitol took only five months to complete, but the Capitol took twelve years. A committee appointed by Congress to investigate the damage to the district concluded that it was cheaper to rebuild the already existing and damaged buildings than to build an entirely new one. On February 13, Madison and Congress passed legislation to borrow $500,000 to repair the public buildings, including the Capitol, "on their present sites in the city of Washington". Benjamin Latrobe, architect of the Capitol who took over for William Thornton in 1803, was rehired to repair the building on April 18. He immediately requested 60,000 feet (18,288 m) of boards, 500 tons of stone, 1,000 barrels of lime, and brick.

With the $500,000 borrowed from Washington banks, Latrobe was able to rebuild the two wings and the central dome before being fired in 1817 over budgetary conflicts. Charles Bulfinch took over and completed the renovations by 1826. Bulfinch modified Latrobe's design by increasing the height of the Capitol dome to match the diameter of 86 ft (26.2 m). With the reconstruction of the public buildings in Washington, the value of land in the area increased dramatically, paving the way for the expansion of the city that developed in the years leading up to the American Civil War.

== Legacy ==
In 2009, President Barack Obama held a ceremony at the White House to honor the Madisons' slave Paul Jennings as a representative of staff action to save the Gilbert Stuart painting and other valuables. (The painting that was saved was a copy Stuart made of the painting, not the original, although it is the same one on display in the East Room.) "A dozen descendants of Jennings came to Washington, to visit the White House. They looked at the painting their relative helped save." In an interview with National Public Radio, Jennings' great-great-grandson, Hugh Alexander, said, "We were able to take a family portrait in front of the painting, which was for me one of the high points." He confirmed that Jennings later purchased his freedom from the widowed Dolley Madison.

During heated free trade negotiations in 2018, Canadian prime minister Justin Trudeau asked President Donald Trump how the United States could justify protective tariffs as a national security issue. Trump retorted, "Didn't you guys burn down the White House?" However, major-general Robert Ross who had commanded the attack was from the British Isles (present-day Northern Ireland).

== In literature ==
Lydia Sigourney reflects on this event in her poem "The Conflagration at Washington", written under her maiden name, Lydia Huntley, in her first collection of poetry of 1815. Bob Dylan references this event in his song "Narrow Way". Corb Lund references this event in his song "Horse Soldier, Horse Soldier".

== See also ==
- List of incidents of political violence in Washington, D.C.
- Attacks on the United States
