= Allen Bowie Davis =

American businessman (1809–1889)

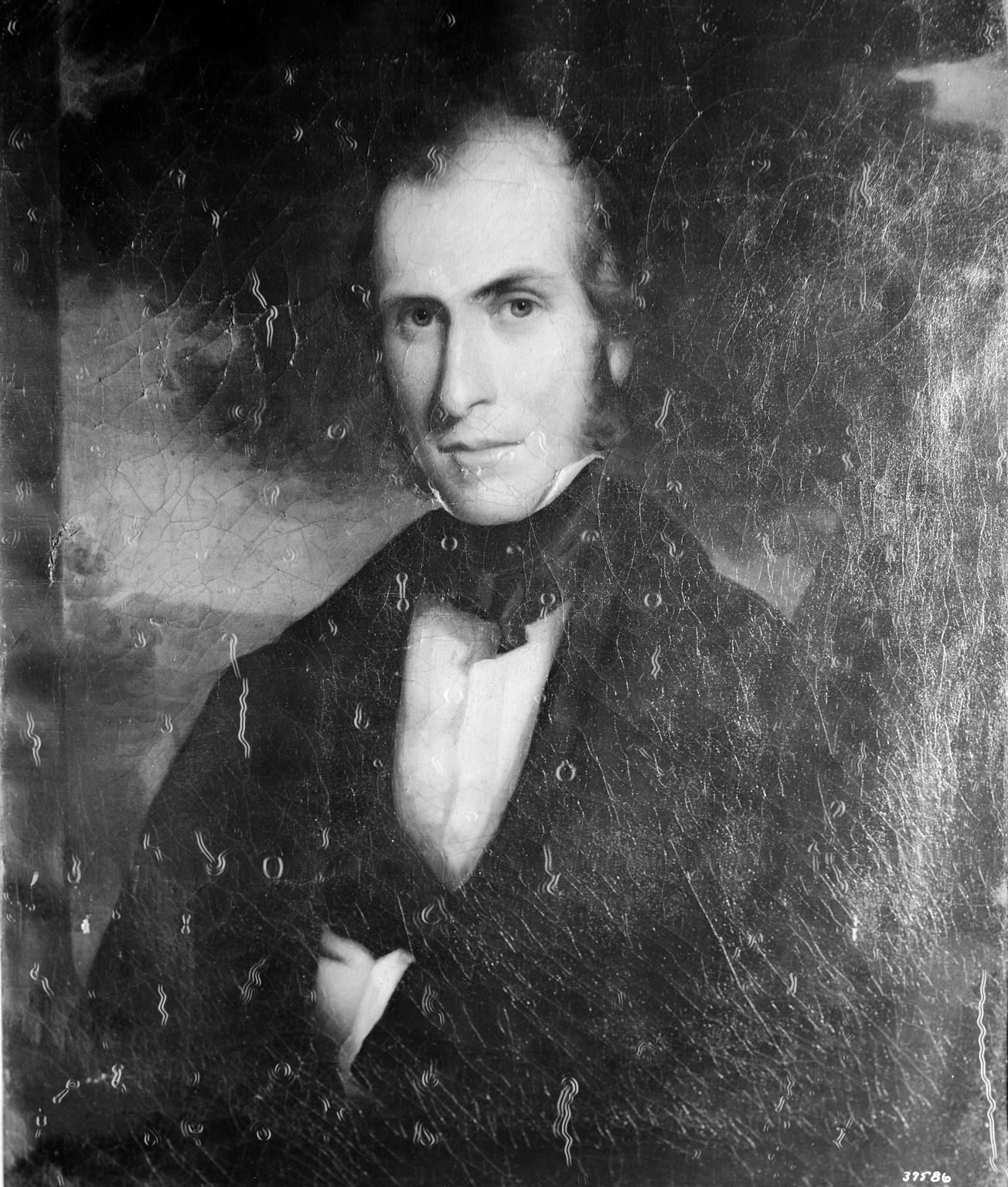
- Portrait by Edward Caledon Bruce
- Born: 16 February 1809; Greenwood estate, Montgomery County, Maryland, US
- Died: 17 April 1889 (aged 80); Baltimore, Maryland, US
- Resting place: Greenwood Cemetery, Brookeville, Montgomery County, Maryland, US
- Education: Brookeville Academy
- Occupations: Farmer, businessman, politician
- Known for: Agriculture research
- Political party: Whig
- Spouses: Rebecca Comfort Dorsey (1809–1836); Hester Ann Wilkins (1809–1887)
- Children: 5
- Relatives: Thomas Beale Dorsey (father-in-law)

Allen Bowie Davis (February 16, 1809 – April 17, 1889) was an American farmer, businessman and Whig politician from Montgomery County, Maryland. He sat on the Maryland Board of Public Works and in the state constitutional convention of 1850, ran several local companies, and was for many years a trustee of Brookeville Academy and of the Maryland Agricultural College.

== Biography ==
Davis was born on February 16, 1809, at Greenwood, the family estate in Montgomery County, in the house his grandfather Ephraim Davis had built in 1755. He was the son of Thomas Davis (1769–1833) and Elizabeth Bowie (1772–1840), and he was named after his maternal grandfather, General Allen Bowie. His father raised a company that marched to Pennsylvania during the Whiskey Rebellion in 1794. Thomas Davis later sat in the state legislature, held county offices from magistrate to judge of the county court, and was president of the Board of Trustees of Brookeville Academy.

He finished his schooling at Brookeville Academy at 16 and went to work on the farm, and his father soon left him in charge of Greenwood.

Besides Greenwood, Davis managed three more farms that came to the family on the death of his uncle, Dr. John Bowie. By 1850 he owned 27 slaves to work his four farms. As president of the Montgomery County Agricultural Society, he bought about 1,400 tons of guano for local farmers in 1846. The fertilizer cost $100,000, and he sold it to them at the importers' price, without a markup. He also wrote a textbook on agriculture for use in public schools.

Davis was one of the first trustees of the Maryland Agricultural College (now the University of Maryland, College Park) and later president of its board. In 1869 he became president of the Maryland State Agricultural Society.

=== Public works ===
In 1840 Davis was elected to the Board of Public Works. There he pushed for the political minority to be represented on public boards, and he applied the same principle as a director of the Chesapeake and Ohio Canal during the building of its final 50 miles, completed in 1850.

He became president of the Montgomery Manufacturing Company, better known as the Triadelphia Cotton Factory, which had not made a profit since it opened in 1809. Davis reorganized it and hired a new manager. Within six years it had paid its stockholders 100 percent of their stock in dividends. In 1849 he obtained the charter for the Brookeville and Washington Turnpike Company, built the road and served as the company's president for 16 years.

== Politics and education ==
At 24 Davis took his late father's place on the Board of Trustees of Brookeville Academy, and he later chaired the board for 26 years. He also headed the county's public school board. Through the academy board he secured a state law banning the sale of liquor within a mile and a half of Brookeville, which Howard called the first prohibition law in Maryland. In 1863 Davis had the ban extended to the whole election district.

In 1850 Davis was elected to the state constitutional convention, where he introduced provisions on state support for agriculture and proposed a system of normal schools. He was elected to the Maryland General Assembly in 1863. In 1876 he chaired the executive committee of the Montgomery County centennial celebration at Rockville and gave one of its addresses.

== Personal life ==
At 21 Davis married Rebecca Comfort Dorsey (1809–1836), the eldest daughter of Chief Justice Thomas Beale Dorsey. After her death he married Hester Ann Wilkins (1809–1887), daughter of the Baltimore merchant William Wilkins. Davis had 5 children: Allen Bowie Davis Jr. (died 1850), Thomas Davis (1840–1849), William Wilkins Davis (1842–1866), Rebecca Dorsey Davis (1843–1921) and Esther Wilkins Davis (1847–1894). William Wilkins Davis moved to Minnesota for his health, married a daughter of Bishop Henry Benjamin Whipple, and died a week after the wedding.

Davis was a vestryman of St. Bartholomew's Episcopal Church and represented it at the conventions of the Episcopal Diocese of Maryland.

Davis once lived at the Wilson House, part of the Roxbury Mill in Howard County, Maryland, and was proprietor of the family estate Greenwood. He spent his winters at his house on Madison Avenue in Baltimore, where he died on April 17, 1889. His papers are held by the Maryland Historical Society.
