= Caleb Bentley =

American silversmith and postmaster (1762–1851)

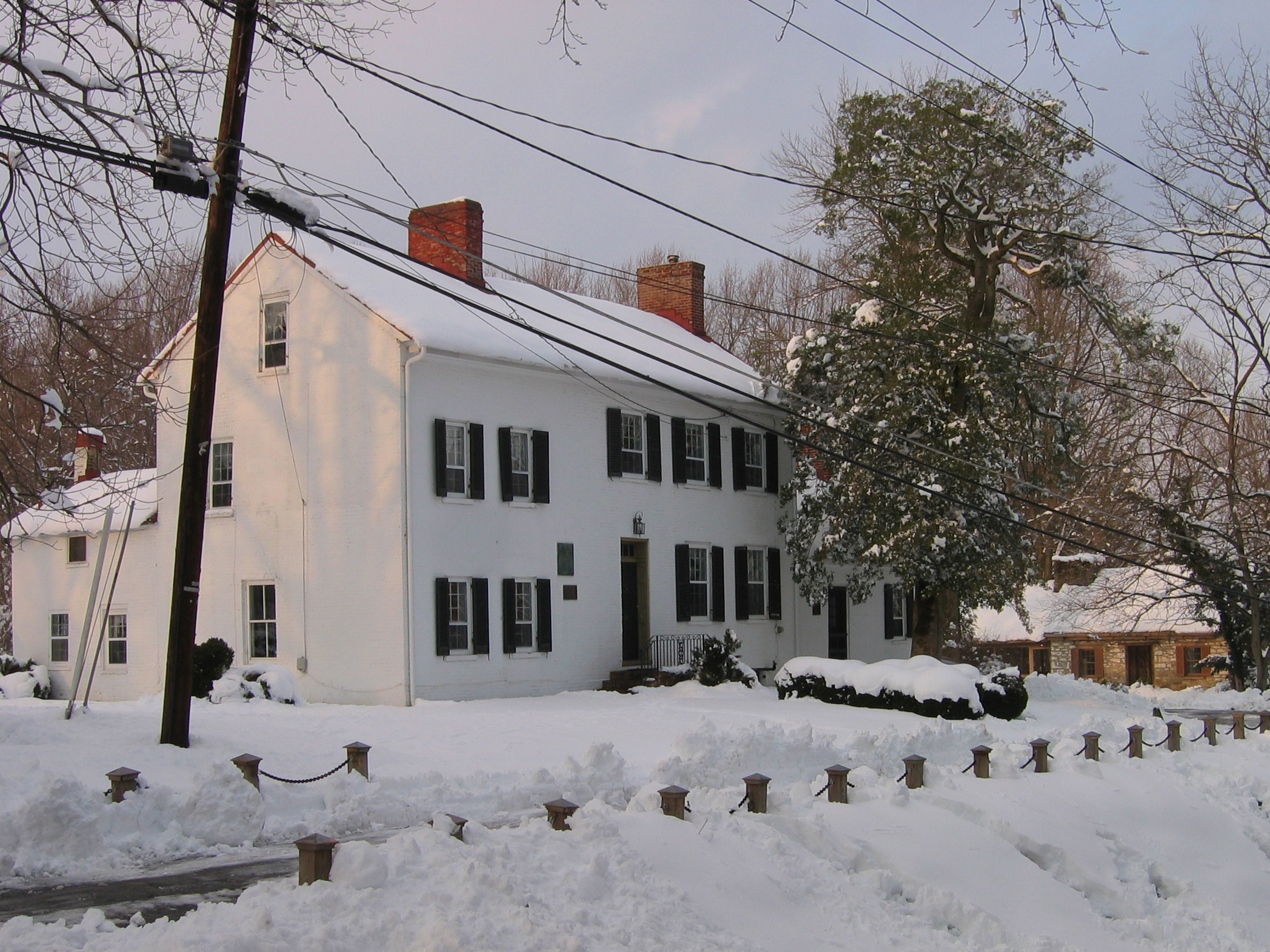
The Madison House in Brookeville was originally owned by Caleb Bentley. The house provided refuge for President James Madison, on August 26, 1814, after the British burned Washington, D.C. during the War of 1812.

Caleb Bentley (1762–1851) was an American silversmith, shopkeeper, and first postmaster in Brookeville, Maryland. Bentley was born in Chester County, Pennsylvania, in 1762.

== Biography ==
In the early 1780s, Caleb emigrated with his brother, spending some time in York, Pennsylvania, and then moved to Leesburg, Virginia, in 1786. While in York, Bentley became a Quaker. In the early 1790s, Bentley established himself as a silversmith in Georgetown, Washington, D.C. Bentley was commissioned by President George Washington to make the brass cornerstone used for the White House groundbreaking ceremony in 1792. A year later, Bentley made a silver cornerstone which was used for the United States Capitol.

Bentley relocated to Montgomery County, Maryland, in 1794, settling in Brookeville, where his wife's (Sarah Brooke) family owned a large tract of land. In Brookeville, Bentley opened a store and a post office in 1802, becoming the First Postmaster of Brookeville. His first wife died in 1805, and two years later, he remarried to Henrietta Thomas. Bentley was also a founder of the Brookeville Academy, and along with two brothers-in-law, established the town of Triadelphia, Maryland, on the Patuxent River.

Bentley's wife, Henrietta Thomas, was a close friend of Dolley Madison. In August 1814, during the War of 1812, the White House was set ablaze by British troops during the Burning of Washington, in retaliation for burning Upper Canada's Parliament Buildings in the Battle of York. On August 26, 1814, President James Madison fled Washington, D.C., initially going to Virginia, but then turning north towards Rockville, where he expected to find General William H. Winder and his troops. Winder's troops had already proceeded on towards Baltimore. Madison continued on eastward and arrived in Brookeville on horseback, where he found refuge in the home of Caleb Bentley. Madison stayed up all night dispatching orders, with Brookeville becoming the temporary capital of the US.

The Bentleys continued to live in Montgomery County for years, though he returned to live for a period of time in Georgetown in the late 1830s. Bentley died in 1851 in Sandy Spring, Maryland.

Bentley owned at least two enslaved people during his life, likely inherited. He freed both of them in 1815 under the conviction "that natural freedom is the right of all men". While Bentley aided free black people in their business and personal matters, and freed his own slaves, he nonetheless continued his involvement in the sale of enslaved people, acting as lender or co-signer on loans for Montgomery County residents for the purchase of enslaved people. Bentley also had cotton processed at the Triadelphia mills that was picked by enslaved laborers. Prior to their marriage, Bentley's wife Henrietta Thomas owned as many as six enslaved people. Henrietta joined the Society of Friends when they declared slavery to be morally wrong, freeing all six of her slaves in 1801.

== See also ==
- Eli Bentley – American clockmaker (1752–1822), his brother
