= Eli Bentley =

American clockmaker (1752–1822)

Eli Bentley (1752–1822) was an American silversmith and a "rather important" clockmaker active in Pennsylvania and Carroll County, Maryland. He started out in Whiteland, Pennsylvania, and after 1778 worked in Taneytown where he produced at least 50 clocks in his lifetime. He typically made just the movements and mechanisms (out of brass), and painted the clock faces and dials, and usually signed the clock faces, leaving other local artisans to create the wooden cabinets. The clock cases for Bentley clocks were typically tall, well-proportioned, and made from red walnut. A number of his clocks were over 8 feet (240 cm) tall and several had eight-day movements. His brother Caleb Bentley made clocks in Montgomery County, Maryland.
