= Jesse Torrey =

American physician and anti-slavery writer (1787-c. 1834)

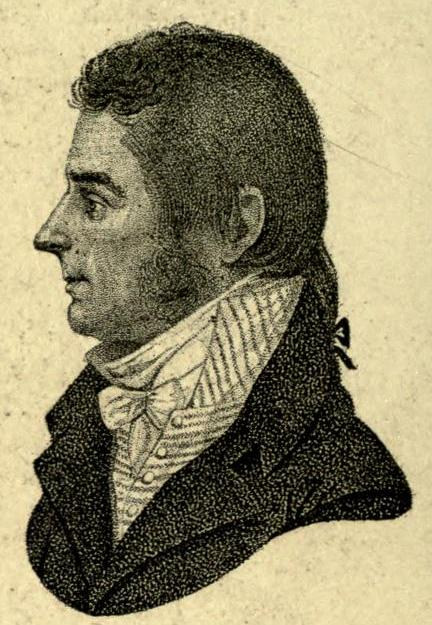
Portrait of Jesse Torrey (1912)

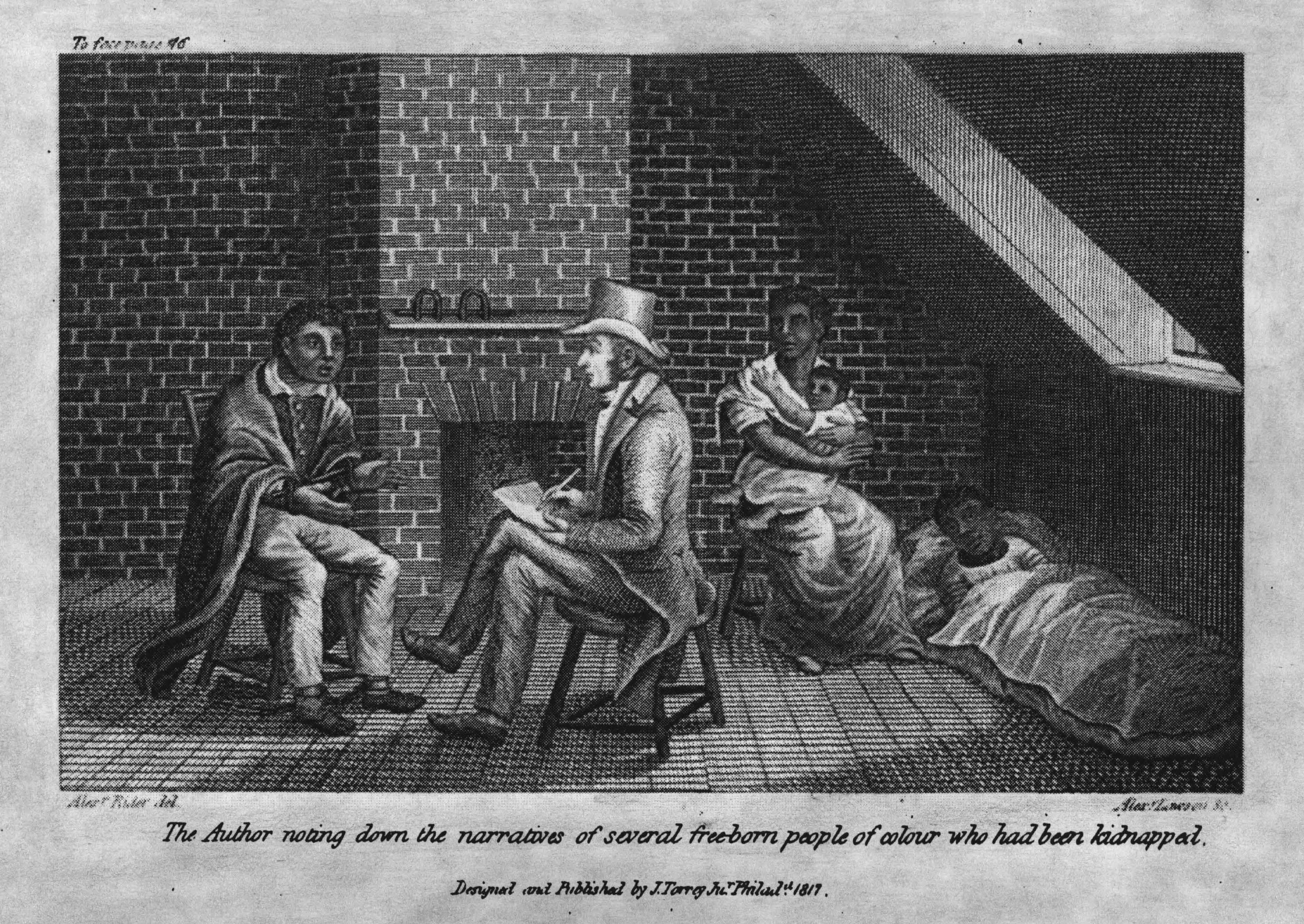
Jesse Torre, Jr., depicted recording the narrative of free people who had been kidnapped

Jesse Torrey, Jr., (May 25, 1787 – ca. 1834) was a Philadelphia medical doctor who gathered first-hand narratives by African Americans and eye-witness accounts by white observers of slavery and kidnapping. He published these, along with his personal observations, in an early anti-slavery book, A Portraiture of Slavery in the United States (Philadelphia, 1817). He also wrote juvenile guides to moral philosophy and natural history. In 1804, he established a free juvenile library in New York for boys and girls. He was born in New Lebanon, New York; his father was Jesse Torrey, and he had a brother, Royal Torrey.

== Publications ==
- A portraiture of domestic slavery, in the United States: with reflections on the practicability of restoring the moral rights of the slave, without impairing the legal privileges of the possessor; and a project of a colonial asylum for free persons of colour: including memoirs of facts on the interior traffic in slaves, and on kidnapping (Philadelphia: published by the author; John Bioren, printer, 1817). Republished as American Slave Trade or, An Account of the Manner in which the Slave Dealers take Free People from some of the United States of America, and carry them away, and sell them as Slaves in other of the States; and of the horrible Cruelties practised in the carrying on of this most infamous Traffic (London: J. M. Cobbett; printed by C. Clement, 1822).
- The moral instructor and guide to virtue and happiness. In five parts. With an appendix containing a constitution and form of subscription for the institution of free public libraries (Philadelphia: Balston Spa [N.Y.] Printed for the author by U. F. Doubleday, 1819.) This book went through several editions into the 1830s.
