= Brookeville Historic District =

Historic district in Maryland, United States

- U.S. National Register of Historic Places
- U.S. Historic district
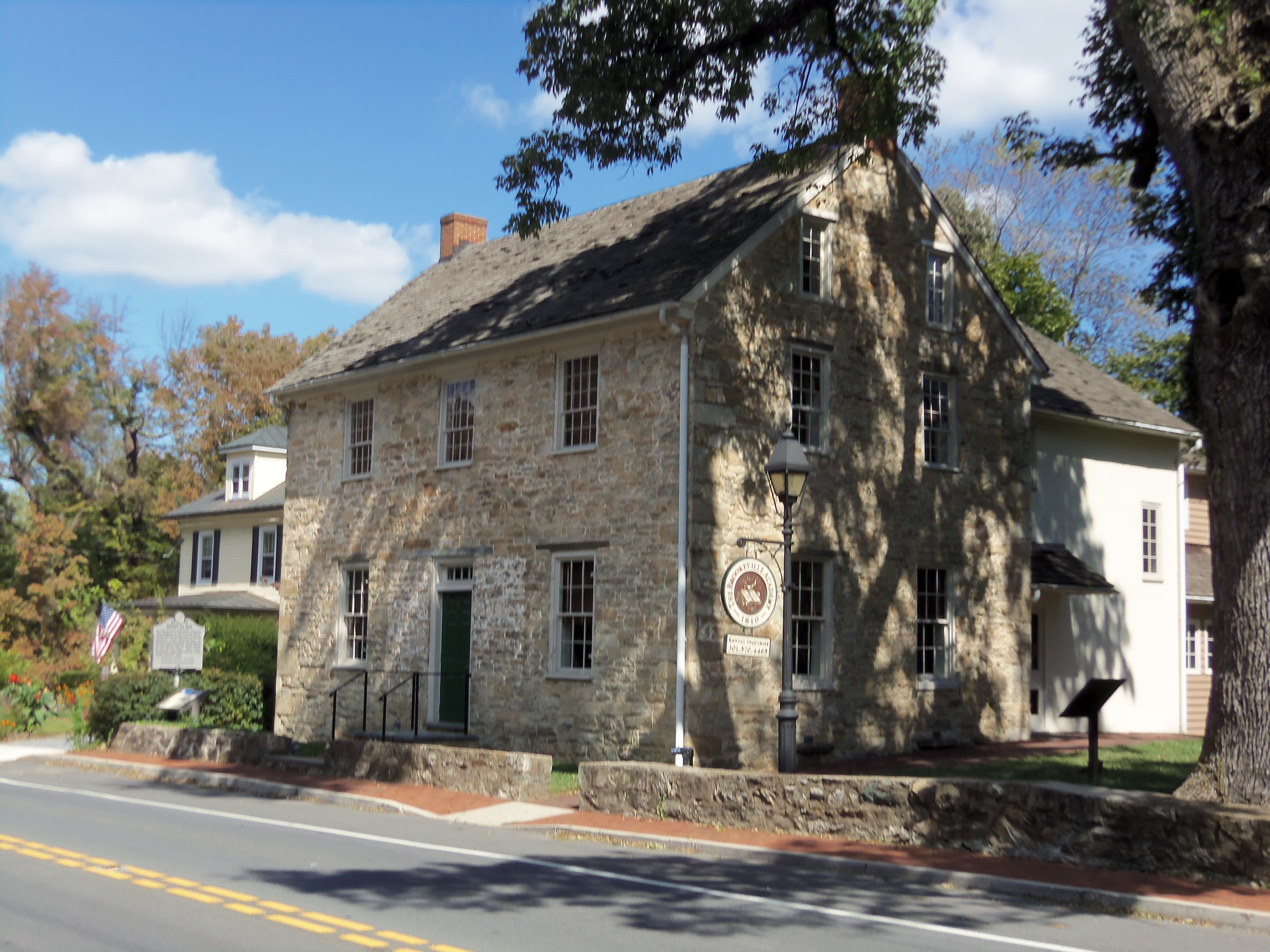

- Location within Maryland Location within the United States
- Location: MD 97, Brookeville, Maryland
- Coordinates: 39°10′52″N 77°3′35″W
- Area: 75 acres (30 ha)
- Built: 1790
- Architectural style: Federal
- NRHP reference No.: 79003272
- Added to NRHP: October 11, 1979

The Brookeville Historic District is a national historic district located at Brookeville, Montgomery County, Maryland. It is located in the crossroads village of Brookeville, with almost all of the houses found along the two main streets, Market and High. The majority of the structures were built before 1900, and range in style from the Federal-style Jordan House to the simple, vernacular cabin known as the Blue House. The houses are built of stone, brick, and frame, and cover a period from 1779 to the 1950s. With the exception of the Post Office and plumbing shop, the town is a residential one. Of particular interest are the many outbuildings and the brick sidewalks.

It was listed on the National Register of Historic Places in 1979.
