= Zadok Magruder =

American politician (1729 – 1811)

Zadok Magruder (1729–1811) was an American politician and military officer who served as an elected official in the government of Maryland and as a colonel in the state militia. He also helped establish Montgomery County.

== Family and pre-war life ==
Magruder's great-grandfather, Alexander Magruder, had come to Prince George's County, Maryland in 1652 after having been deported from Perthshire, Scotland where he was an indentured servant pursuing the Scottish Rebellion. He was the son of John and Susanna Magruder, and the grandson of Samuel and Sarah Magruder. Most of the Magruders in America were farmers, merchants and mechanics.

He was born in 1729 in Prince George's County, Maryland. As a young man, he moved to Montgomery County, Maryland where he inherited 600 acres near what became Norbeck Road in 1745. He built a house called "The Ridge" in 1750 in Redland, a community which had a population of about fifty at the time. In 1754, he married Rachel Pottinger Bowie.

== The American Revolution ==
Magruder and his brother Nathan were members of the General Committee to Annapolis in 1774 (as local representatives). The General Committee to Annapolis functioned as the state or colony level of government for Maryland. Both Magruders became members of a committee charged with carrying out the decision of the American Continental Congress on the topic of the British Tea Act. Magruder became a member of the Maryland Committee of Correspondence. When in command of the "Home Defense Battalion of Lower Frederick County", which was part of the Maryland militia, he attained the rank of colonel.

== Montgomery County establishment ==
The Magruder brothers were appointed as commissioners to organize and establish the government of Montgomery County, Maryland when it became a separate county from Frederick County in 1776.

== Post-war life and death ==
He and his wife had eleven children: eight girls and three boys. They lived in an area known as Mount Pleasant, where they built a house, also named "Mount Pleasant", in about 1807. The 1790 United States census showed him owning 26 enslaved African Americans. One son, Zadok, later became a doctor. After he died in 1811, the Mount Pleasant house was inherited by his son Robert Pottinger Magruder.

== Legacy ==
A high school named after Colonel Zadok Magruder was built in Derwood (Montgomery County), Maryland, near the site of "The Ridge" house.
