= Cutts (surname) =

Cutts is a surname. Notable people with the name include:

- Allen S. Cutts Confederate soldier during the American Civil War
- Arthur Cutts (1879–1967), Australian politician from Tasmania
- Bill Cutts (1914–2003), Australian diplomat
- Charles Cutts (1769–1846), American politician from New Hampshire
- Dennis Cutts (born 1968), American basketball coach
- Don Cutts (born 1953), Canadian ice hockey player
- Gertrude Spurr Cutts (1858–1941), Canadian artist
- Graham Cutts (1884–1958), British film director of the 1920s
- J. E. K. Cutts (1847–1938), English church architect
- James M. Cutts (1838–1903), American soldier during the American Civil War
- Jiko Linda Cutts (born 1947), Sōtō Zen priest
- John Cutts (disambiguation), multiple people
- Luke Cutts (born 1988), British pole vaulter
- Mary Cutts (1814–1846), American socialite and amateur historian
- Oliver Cutts (1873–1939), American football player, coach, and college athletics administrator
- Marsena E. Cutts (1833–1883), American politician from Iowa
- Matt Cutts, American software developer
- Patricia Cutts (1926–1974), English film and television actress
- Richard Cutts (1771–1845), American politician from Massachusetts
- Richard Cutts (bishop), Anglican missionary in Africa and afterwards Bishop of Argentina
- Sarah Jones (artist and musician), born Sarah Cutts
- Stephen Cutts, United Nations official
- Terence John Cutts, Canadian Publican Palgrave/Toronto
- Betty Wylder, born Elizabeth Anne Cutts (1923–1994), American folklorist, organist
