= Cutts =

Cutts may refer to:

== Places ==
- Cutts, Shetland, a settlement in the Shetland Islands
- Cutts Island State Park, in Pierce County, Washington, United States
- Cutt's Grant, New Hampshire, United States
- Cutts-Madison House, in Washington, DC, United States
- Cutts & Case Shipyard, in Oxford, Maryland

== People ==
- Cutts baronets
- Cutts (surname)

== Other uses ==
- Cutts the butcher, a fictional character from The Adventures of Tintin by Hergé
