= Mary Cutts =

American socialite and writer (1814–1856)

- Born: Mary Estelle Elizabeth Cutts; September 16, 1814; Washington, D.C., U.S.
- Died: July 14, 1856 (aged 41); Botetourt County, Virginia, U.S.
- Resting place: Oak Hill Cemetery
- Known for: Memoirs of Dolley Madison
- Father: Richard Cutts

Mary Estelle Elizabeth Cutts (September 16, 1814 – July 14, 1856) was an American socialite, amateur historian, and memoirist. She exchanged letters frequently with Dolley Madison and, after Madison's death in 1849, spent the last seven years of her life writing and attempting to publish two memoirs. The memoirs included biographical information on Madison and were published in 1886 as the heavily edited Memoirs and Letters of Dolley Madison, Wife of James Madison, President of the United States by Lucia B. Cutts. The work was the standard on Madison's life for over a century.

== Biography ==
Mary Estelle Elizabeth Cutts was born in Washington, D.C., on September 16, 1814, to Anna Payne Cutts and Richard Cutts, a congressman from Massachusetts living in what is now Maine. She was the sixth of seven children and would grow closest to her younger brother, Richard, and sister Dolley. Cutts's aunt was Dolley Madison, the wife of James Madison, and Mary was her "favored niece". Mary never married and spent her life living with the Cutts family in Washington, Boston, and on Cutts Island in present-day Maine. As children, the Cutts wrote to the Madisons and lived at their home in Montpelier, Virginia, during the summer. By the 1820s Dolley viewed Mary as a daughter. Mary spent that decade living with her father in a new home on Lafayette Square in Washington. Towards the end of the month she met her cousin Annie Payne. The two got along well.

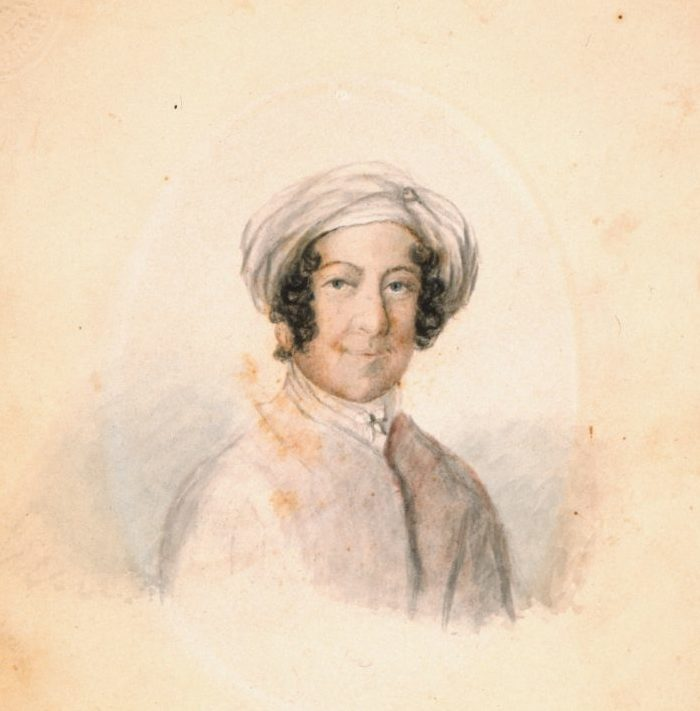
Dolley Madison painted by Mary Cutts c. 1840

Throughout the 1830s, Mary and her sister, Dolley Payne Cutts, lived in Washington, D.C., and spent much time with their aunt. The historian Catherine Allgor describes Madison as "mother and best friend" to the girls. She assisted Mary Cutts in acquiring signatures in an autograph book and advised them on the proper conduct in social situations and general life. The Cutts girls wrote Madison numerous letters and sent her gifts and news. Mary was homeschooled and was an amateur artist, drawing figures including her aunt. Anna Cutts, Mary's mother, died in August 1832. She was devastated by the news. Two years later Mary was involved in Margaret Bayard Smith's effort to produce a biographical sketch of Dolley. Mary assisted James Madison in dealing with his papers before his death in 1836. Cutts was further devastated when her sister Dolley died in 1838.

By the 1840s Mary, her father and brother Richard were living on 14th Street in Washington with a free black woman. Mary accompanied Madison on a trip to New York City in early 1842. Cutts visited John Quincy Adams and his wife Louisa Adams often and was with Louisa upon her husband's death in 1848. She visited the Adams in Quincy, Massachusetts in 1852 and relatives in Virginia in July 1856. While there she fell ill around the fourth of July and died on July 14 of tuberculosis. She was buried in Oak Hill Cemetery.

== Memoirs ==
Mary Cutts transcribed and saved many of her letters with Dolley Madison. Madison had instructed upon her death that her private papers be burned, a request that Cutts carried out, though how much she actually desired be destroyed is unclear. Cutts and her sister Annie confiscated Madison's letters from an agent of Madison's estate and burned many of them.

Cutts wrote two memoirs about Dolley Madison after Madison's death. It is unclear the relationship between the two works—they may have been sections or different drafts. Her first was written in the early 1850s and was 32 or 57 pages long. It covers Madison's life from her ancestry to 1812, omitting the period between 1801 and 1809. The second, written at the request of editors for a "more conventional" memoir, was 61 or 95 pages. This memoir goes from 1801 to Madison's death. These two memoirs span all of Dolley Madison's life, and Allgor writes that "it is not illogical to assume that Dolley herself was the source of the information." However, it is unknown what materials Cutts used in compiling her memoirs and is intended to show Madison in "the best light possible." Allgor considers the second memoir to have "lost sight of Dolley" and overly focus on other historical events. In 2015 Allgor described the memoir as possibly "the closest form of Dolley's autobiographical voice left to history." Historian Ralph Ketcham, in a biography of James Madison, describes Cutts' work as "the most authentic, intimate sketch known of their [the Madisons'] family life". They contain distortions and inaccuracies about Dolley's life.

Cutts found an interested publisher, Jared Sparks, who demanded inclusion of "important men and masculine subjects", according to Allgor, that he thought would ensure the memoir was taken seriously. This did not work out, and Henry D. Gilpin, who published James Madison's memoirs was contacted. However, Cutts died in 1856 before she could finish her work.

In 1888 the Memoirs and Letters of Dolley Madison, Wife of James Madison, President of the United States, a work edited by Lucia B. Cutts (Dolley's grandniece), was published by Houghton Mifflin and Company. It made use of the unpublished memoirs and transcribed letters Mary Cutts had put together. According to the historian Richard N. Côté, Lucia Cutts "heavily edited, rewrote, and Bowdlerized many of the letters Mary Cutts had transcribed." Mary Cutts was not attributed in the volume. This book was the standard text on Dolley's life until 2003. That year saw the publication of The Selected Letters of Dolley Payne Madison by University of Virginia Press.

In 2012 Cutts's original memoirs were republished as The Queen of America: Mary Cutts's Life of Dolley Madison. The book was edited by Allgor and published by the University of Virginia Press and include essays contextualizing Cutts's work. In the publication Allgor describes Cutts memoirs as "without question... the most significant account of Dolley Madison's life" and "the foundation for all subsequent work."
