= Magnificent Doll =

1946 film by Frank Borzage

- Directed by: Frank Borzage
- Screenplay by: Irving Stone
- Produced by: Jack H. Skirball
- Starring: Ginger Rogers; David Niven; Burgess Meredith
- Cinematography: Joseph A. Valentine
- Edited by: Ted J. Kent
- Music by: Hans J. Salter
- Production company: Hallmark Productions
- Distributed by: Universal Pictures
- Release date: November 28, 1946
- Running time: 95 minutes
- Country: United States
- Language: English

Magnificent Doll is a 1946 American historical drama film directed by Frank Borzage and starring Ginger Rogers as Dolley Madison and David Niven as Aaron Burr. The supporting cast features Burgess Meredith as James Madison and Grandon Rhodes as Thomas Jefferson. The screenplay was written by Irving Stone (author of Lust for Life and The Agony and the Ecstasy).

== Plot ==
In the late eighteenth century a young widow is wooed by Aaron Burr and James Madison. At first, she prefers the charming Burr, but when he reveals his ambitions to rule the United States as a tyrant, she decides to marry Madison. After Burr tries to overthrow the government, Dolley prevents him from being hanged by an angry mob.

== Cast ==
- Ginger Rogers as Dolley Payne Madison
- David Niven as Aaron Burr
- Burgess Meredith as James Madison
- Peggy Wood as Mrs. Payne
- Stephen McNally as John Todd
- Robert Barrat as Mr. Payne
- Grandon Rhodes as Thomas Jefferson
- Frances E. Williams as Amy
- Henri Letondal as Count D'Arignon
- Joseph Forte as Senator Ainsworth
- John Hamilton as Mr. Witherspoon (uncredited)
- Olaf Hytten as Blennerhassett (uncredited)
- Arthur Space as Alexander Hamilton (uncredited)
- Larry Steers as Lafayette (uncredited)
- Grace Cunard as Woman with a baby (uncredited)

== Production ==
Universal Pictures paid Sam Goldwyn $100,000 to borrow David Niven for the film. Filming took place under the working title of The Life of Dolly [sic] Madison from June to August in 1946 at Universal City and a ranch in Chatsworth, Los Angeles. During production, Frances E. Williams complained about the lack of black extras and the director hired more black actors.

The sets and costumes cost $1.79 million. Vera West and Travis Banton designed the wardrobe and milliner Lilly Daché designed the hats that Ginger Rogers wore.

== Promotion ==
RC Cola promoted the film with ads featuring Ginger Rogers in costume as Dolley Madison. Rogers also travelled to Ohio to make a personal appearance at the Cincinnati premiere.

== Reception ==
The New York Times criticized the film for its lack of historical accuracy. David Niven later described the movie as a "stinker" and stated that he took the role because he needed the money.

The film lost money at the box office and became Ginger Rogers' least successful film without Fred Astaire. Shortly after the premiere, Burr's descendent Samuel Burr founded the Aaron Burr Association to "keep alive the memory of Colonel Aaron Burr".
