= Dorothea Abrahams =

West Indian philanthropist

- Born: c. 1779; Anastasia, West Indies
- Died: February 6, 1853 (aged 72 or 73); Savannah, Georgia, U.S.
- Resting place: Laurel Grove Cemetery, Savannah, Georgia, U.S.

Dorothea Abrahams (c. 1779 – February 6, 1853) was a philanthropist from the West Indies who left funds in her will to open the Abrahams Home for Indigent Widows of Savannah in Savannah, Georgia, United States.

== Life and career ==
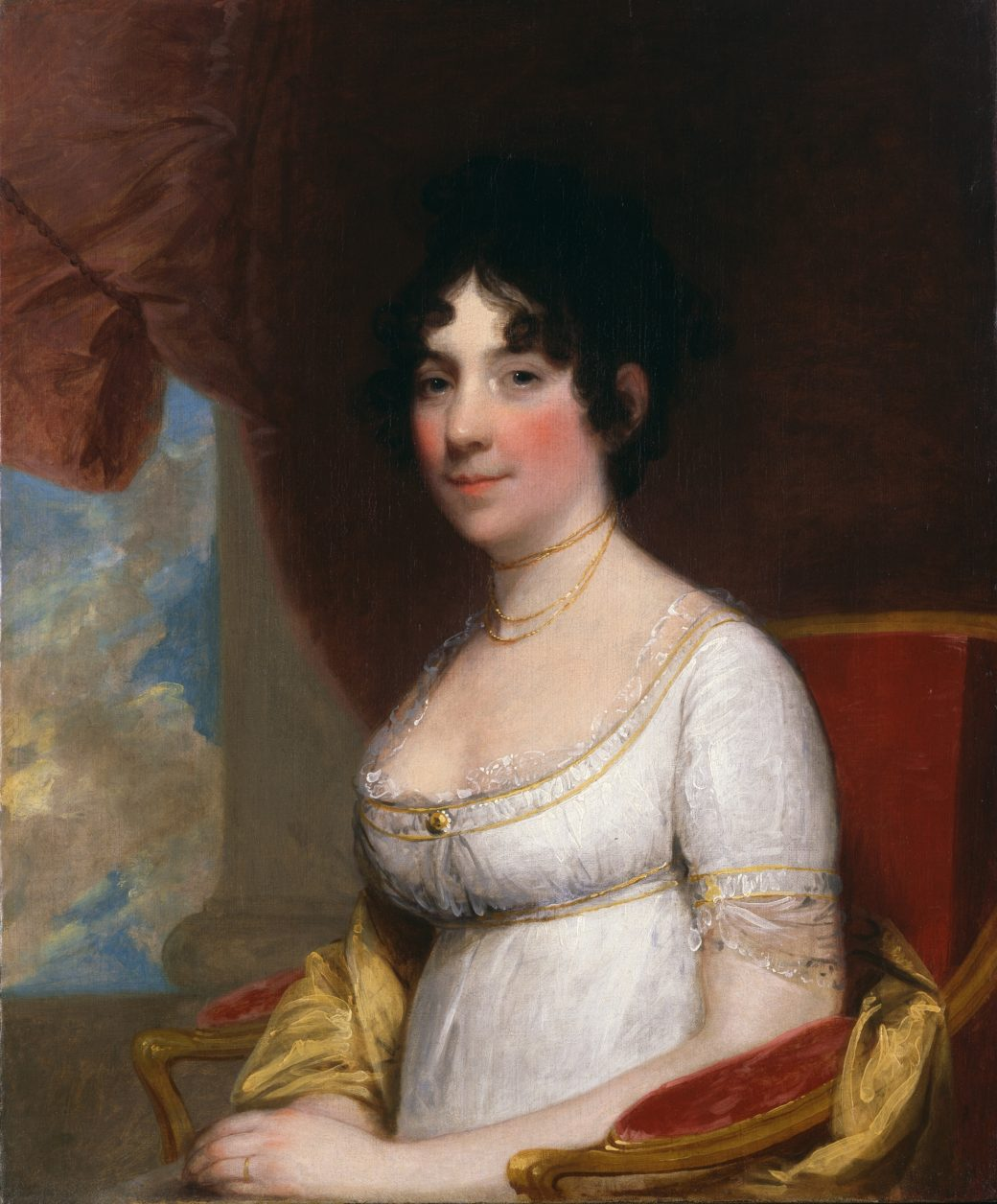
Gilbert Stuart's 1804 Portrait of Dolley Madison, with whom Abrahams had a lifelong friendship

Abrahams was born on Anastasia, West Indies, in 1779. A visitor to the island from Philadelphia brought Dorothea home with her. At school in Philadelphia, one of her classmates was Dolley Madison, future First Lady of the United States.

She became friends with a girl, last name Pooler, who was from Savannah, Georgia. Abrahams accepted Pooler's invitation to come visit her for a while, and it was there that she met and married Captain Abraham De Lyon Abrahams in 1803. They lived on Broughton Street. A Jew, the captain was a member of the Congregation Mickve Israel in Savannah's Monterey Square.

In 1808, the couple moved to Washington, D.C. James Madison had just become president, and Dorothea's childhood friendship with Madison's wife seemingly earned Abraham employment under the president.

The Abrahamses returned to Savannah in 1826. Four years later, their household consisted of eleven people: Abraham, Dorothea, six male slaves and three female slaves.

Captain Abrahams died in 1844, aged 71, of apoplexy. Five years later, Dorothea was living at 179 Broughton Street in Savannah. In 1852, she bought a 12-year-old "mulatto girl" from George Wylly.

== Death and legacy ==
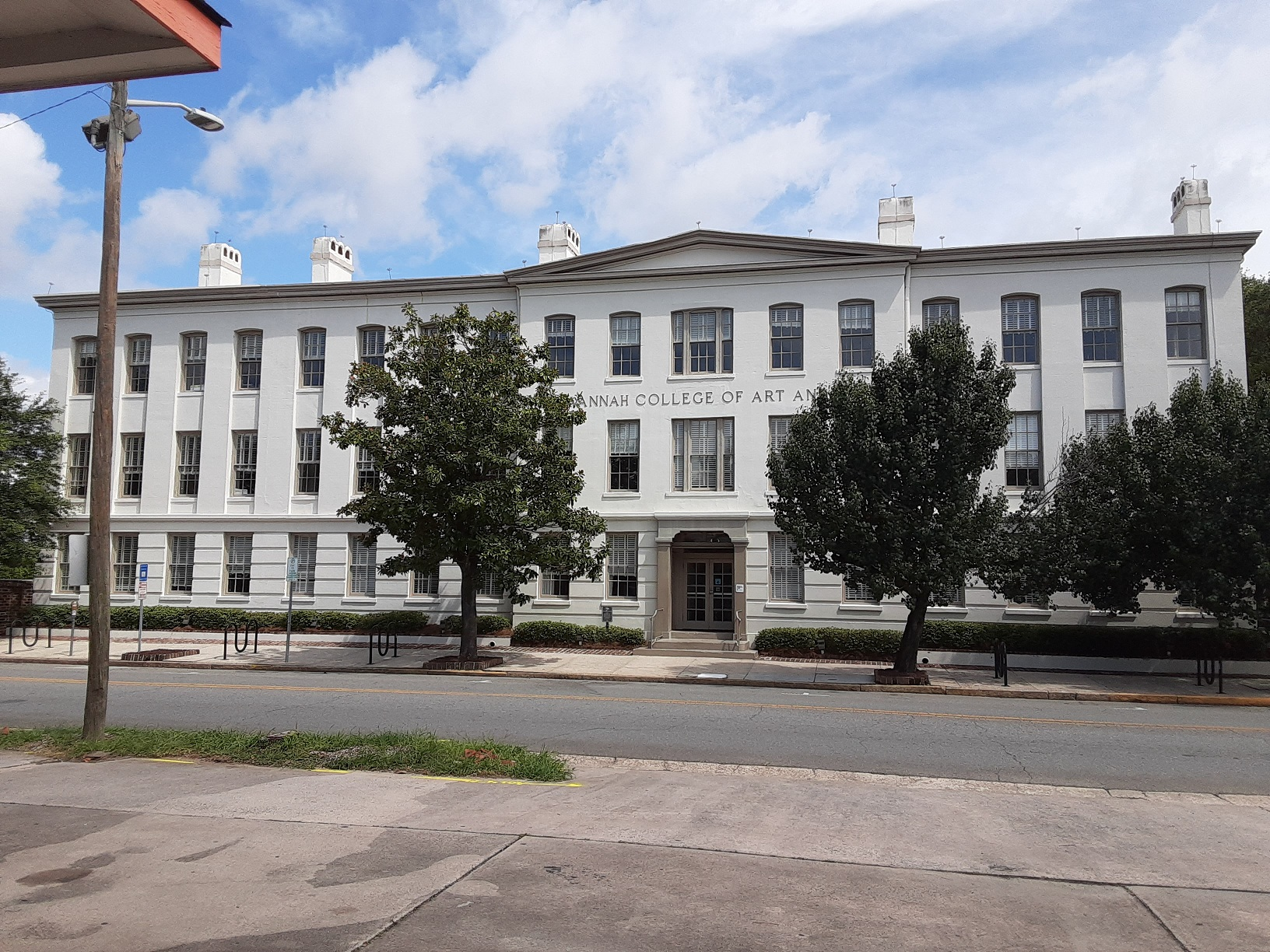
Abrahams Home, at today's 548 East Broughton Street in Savannah

Abrahams died on February 6, 1853, aged 72 or 73, from dropsy. She was interred in Savannah's Laurel Grove Cemetery. Her husband, whom she survived by nine years, was buried in Mordecai Sheftall Cemetery.

In her will, she left funds to establish the Abrahams Home for Indigent Widows of Savannah. Lots 31 and 34 on Broughton Street, at its intersection with East Broad Street, were set aside to build the three-storey home. Its cornerstone was laid on July 3, 1856. John S. Norris was its architect.

In the 1980s, the home was occupied by women of advanced age who were in good health and could care for themselves. They paid rent on a sliding scale according to their income.

In 2022, the fund started by Abrahams had become a $2 million endowment.
