= John Cutts =

John Cutts may refer to:

- Sir John Cutts (died 1615), English MP
- Sir John Cutts (died 1646), English MP, son of above
- John Cutts, 1st Baron Cutts (1661–1707), British soldier and author
- John Cutts (jockey) (c. 1829 – 1872), Australian jockey
- Sir John Cutts, 1st Baronet (c. 1634 – 1670), of the Cutts baronets
- John Edward Knight Cutts (1847–1938), English ecclesiastical architect

== See also ==
- Cutts (disambiguation)
