= Jean Pierre Sioussat =

Jean Pierre Sioussat (September 22, 1781 – April 2, 1864) was a Paris-born American who was the first Master of Ceremonies during the presidency of James Madison. Dolley Madison was known to manage the weekly state dinners that the President hosted, and as her duties expanded, Dolley hired Sioussat. He had prior worked for the British Minister and "his knowledge of French customs made him particularly valuable at official functions."

During the Burning of Washington during the War of 1812, Sioussat assisted Dolley Madison, the White House doorman John Suse' and Paul Jennings in saving the George Washington portrait and evacuating the White House.
