= Fisk metallic burial case =

Mid-19th-century cast-iron coffin

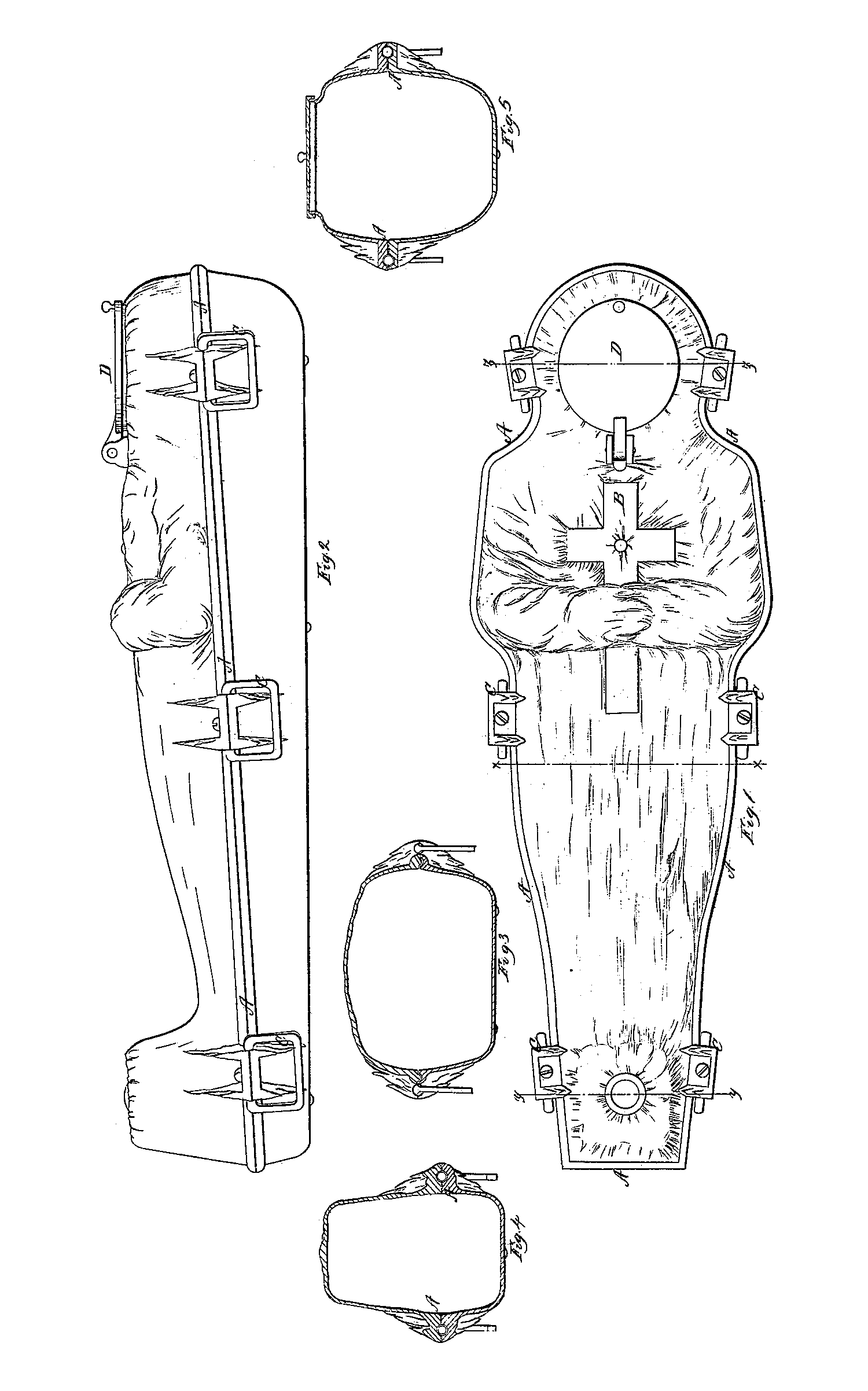
Fisk metallic burial case, from U.S. Patent 5920

Fisk metallic burial cases were patented in 1848 by Almond Dunbar Fisk and manufactured in Providence, Rhode Island. The cast-iron coffins or burial cases were popular in the mid–19th century among wealthier families. While pine coffins in the 1850s would have cost around $2 (equivalent to $77 in 2025), a Fisk coffin could command a price upwards of $100 (equivalent to $3,870 in 2025). Nonetheless, the metallic coffins were highly desirable by more affluent individuals and families for their potential to deter grave robbers.

The case was custom-formed to the body, resembling an Egyptian sarcophagus with sculpted arms and a glass window plate for viewing the face of the deceased, without the risk of exposure to odor or pathogens. The airtight cases were valued for their potential to preserve the remains of individuals who died far from home, until they could be shipped back for burial by the family. This type of burial in the 19th century indicated that the individual buried was someone of cultural and societal importance.

== Manufacturing background ==
The Fisk metallic burial case was designed and patented by Almond D. Fisk under US Patent No. 5920 on November 14, 1848. In 1849, the cast-iron coffin was publicly unveiled at the New York State Agricultural Society Fair in Syracuse, New York and the American Institute Exhibition in New York City.

In response to the high demand, Fisk established the Fisk and Raymond Company and began production in Providence, Rhode Island. Within the first year of receiving the patent, Fisk set up a small foundry in Winfield Junction in Long Island, New York. In order to keep up with demand, Fisk additionally licensed the right to manufacture the case to two larger firms, including W.C. Davis & Co. of Cincinnati, Ohio and A.C. Barstow & Co. of Providence.

In fall 1849, the foundry was destroyed by fire, along with all of company's machinery, tools, and inventory. In an effort to rebuild his business, Fisk borrowed $15,000 from two investors, John G. Forbes, member of the 49th New York State Legislature and Horace White, 37th Governor of the State of New York. The following year, Fisk's health began to decline, and he was unable to work by fall 1850. At this time, he transferred his patents and business to Forbes and White.

Fisk was succeeded by William H. Forbes, son of initial investor, John G. Forbes. In 1875, Fisk's brother-in-law, William M. Raymond, partnered with Forbes and restructured the company as W.M. Raymond & Company. In subsequent years, Syracuse City Attorney, Daniel Phelps Wood, gained controlling interest in W.M. Raymond & Company and made his brother, William S. Wood the foundry's superintendent.

In October 1877, the name was changed to the Metallic Burial Case Company. On December 7, 1888, The New York Times reported that the Metallic Burial Case Company was folding.

== Endorsements ==
In April 1850, former U.S. vice president and secretary of state John C. Calhoun was buried in a Fisk coffin at the Congressional Cemetery in Washington, D.C.; President Zachary Taylor died unexpectedly in July 1850 and was entombed in a Fisk case. Around this time, Jefferson Davis, Henry Clay, and Daniel Webster publicly endorsed the Fisk model, stating that in their opinion, the Fisk was "the best article known to us for transporting the dead to their final resting place".

== Notable use cases ==
Dolley Madison, the widow of the fourth president of the United States, James Madison, had her late husband disinterred and placed inside a Fisk coffin. She also made arrangements to likewise be buried in one, which took place upon her death in 1849. The use of Fisk metallic coffins became popular among politicians and the growing middle class during the 1850s, after her large public funeral ceremony. President Zachary Taylor, who died in 1850, was among those who were interred in such a coffin during the period immediately following his death while he was publicly displayed in the White House.

The perfectly preserved body of an unidentified young woman, tentatively referred to as the Lady in Red due to her distinctive red velvet dress, was accidentally discovered buried along a bank of the Yazoo River near Cruger, Mississippi, in 1969. She had been buried in an unmarked location in an area which was wilderness at the time of her burial, hermetically sealed inside a Fisk coffin, fully immersed in alcohol. The burial was estimated to have taken place during the middle of the 19th century, before the American Civil War. The accidental excavation caused damage to her coffin, and her body was reburied at Odd Fellows Cemetery in Lexington, Mississippi. Her identity remains unknown.

== Locations ==
A Fisk coffin can be found on display at the Museum of Appalachia in Clinton, Tennessee.
