= Dolley Madison silver dollar =

1999 U.S. commemorative coin

Dolley Madison dollar
- United States
- Value: 1 U.S. Dollar
- Mass: 26.730 g
- Diameter: 38.1 mm (1.500 in)
- Thickness: 2.58 mm
- Edge: Reeded
- Composition: 90% Ag / 10% Cu
- Years of minting: 1999
- Mintage: 89,104 Uncirculated 224,403 Proof
- Mint marks: P

Obverse
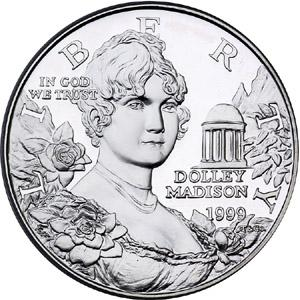
- Design: Portrait of Dolley Madison surrounded by cape jasmine with the ice house from the family estate, Montpelier, in the background.
- Designer: Unknown (credited to Tiffany & Co.)
- Design date: 1999

Reverse
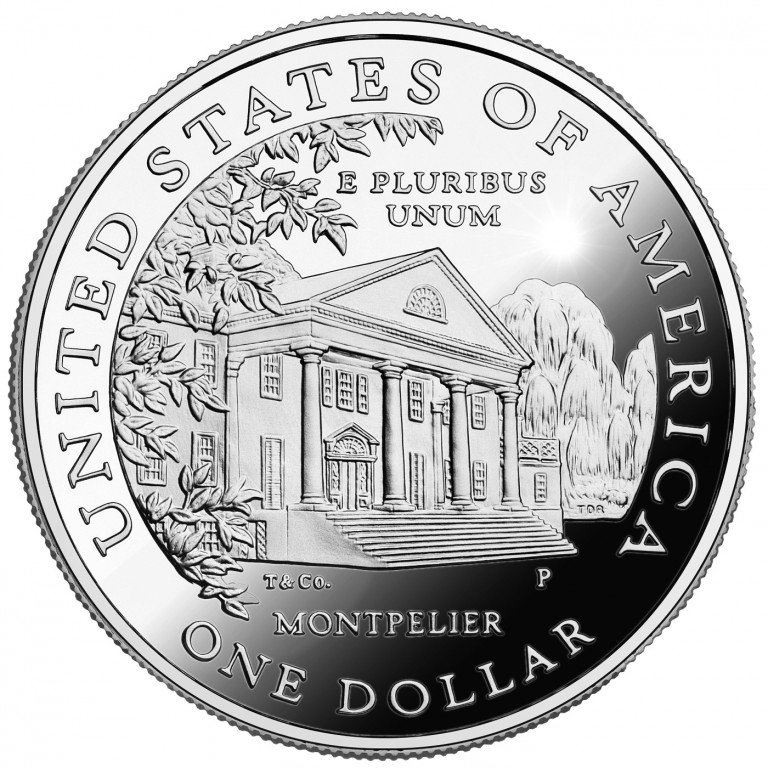
- Design: The front portico of Montpelier with foliage and willows
- Designer: Unknown (credited to Tiffany & Co.)
- Design date: 1999

The Dolley Madison silver dollar is a commemorative silver dollar issued by the United States Mint in 1999. The obverse depicts Dolley Madison, and the reverse shows the Madison family house Montpelier. Some proceeds benefited the National Trust for Historic Preservation. The coin was authorized by Public Law 104-329. It was made to commemorate the 150th anniversary of Dolley Madison’s death.

== Sales ==
500,000 Dolley Madison dollars were authorized by Public Law 104-329. The Philadelphia Mint struck 158,247 proof and 22,948 uncirculated Dolley Madison dollars.

== See also ==
- List of United States commemorative coins and medals (1990s)
- United States commemorative coins
- United States Commemorative Coin Act of 1996
