= Cyrus King =

American politician

Member of the U.S. House of Representatives from Massachusetts's 14th district
- In office March 4, 1813 – March 3, 1817
- Preceded by: Richard Cutts
- Succeeded by: John Holmes

Personal details
- Born: September 6, 1772 Scarborough, Massachusetts Bay, British America (now Maine)
- Died: April 25, 1817 (aged 44) Saco, Massachusetts, U.S. (now Maine)
- Party: Federalist
- Relations: Rufus King (half brother)
- Education: Columbia College
- Occupation: Lawyer

Cyrus King (September 6, 1772 – April 25, 1817) was a U.S. representative from Massachusetts, half-brother of Rufus King.

== Early life and education ==
Born in Scarborough in Massachusetts Bay's Province of Maine, King attended Phillips Academy, Andover, Massachusetts, and was graduated from Columbia College, New York City, in 1794. He studied law.

== Career ==
King served as private secretary to Rufus King when he was United States Minister to England in 1796. He completed law studies in Biddeford and was admitted to the bar in 1797, commencing his law practice in Saco. He served as major general of the Sixth Division, Massachusetts Militia. King was one of the founders of Thornton Academy in Saco.

King was elected as a Federalist to the Thirteenth and Fourteenth Congresses (March 4, 1813 – March 3, 1817).

== Death ==
He returned to Saco (then in Massachusetts' District of Maine), where he died on April 25, 1817, and was interred in Laurel Hill Cemetery.

== Sources ==
- United States Congress. "Cyrus King (id: K000197)". Biographical Directory of the United States Congress.

U.S. House of Representatives
Preceded by Richard Cutts	Member of the U.S. House of Representatives from Massachusetts's 14th congressional district 1813–1817	Succeeded by John Holmes
