= James M. Cutts =

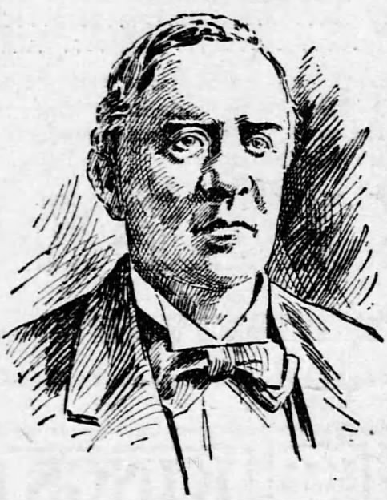
- The Evening Star (Washington, D.C.), February 25, 1903
- Born: October 20, 1837; Washington, D.C., U.S.
- Died: February 24, 1903 (aged 65); Washington, D.C., U.S.
- Burial place: Arlington National Cemetery
- Military career
- Allegiance: United States of America
- Branch: United States Army Infantry
- Service years: 1861–1868
- Rank: Captain (Army); Lieutenant Colonel (Brevet)
- Units: 1st Battalion, 11th Infantry Regiment
- Conflicts: American Civil War
- Awards: Medal of Honor

James Madison Cutts Jr. (October 20, 1837 – February 24, 1903) was an American soldier who fought in the American Civil War. Cutts received the country's highest award for bravery during combat, the Medal of Honor, for his actions during the Battles of the Wilderness, Spotsylvania and Petersburg in Virginia in May and June 1864. He was honored with the award on 2 May 1891.

== Early life ==
Cutts was born in Washington D.C. on October 20, 1837, the son of James Madison Cutts, an official of the U.S. Treasury Department, and Ellen Elisabeth O'Neal, the sister of Rose O'Neal Greenhow. Cutts' sister Adèle was the second wife of US Senator Stephen A. Douglas. Cutts was the grandson of congressman Richard Cutts, whose wife Anna was the sister of First Lady Dolley Madison. He attended Georgetown Preparatory School, graduating with the Class of 1852, and went on to earn his Master of Arts degree from Brown University in 1856. He then attended Harvard Law School, from which he received his LL.B. in 1860.

== Civil War service ==
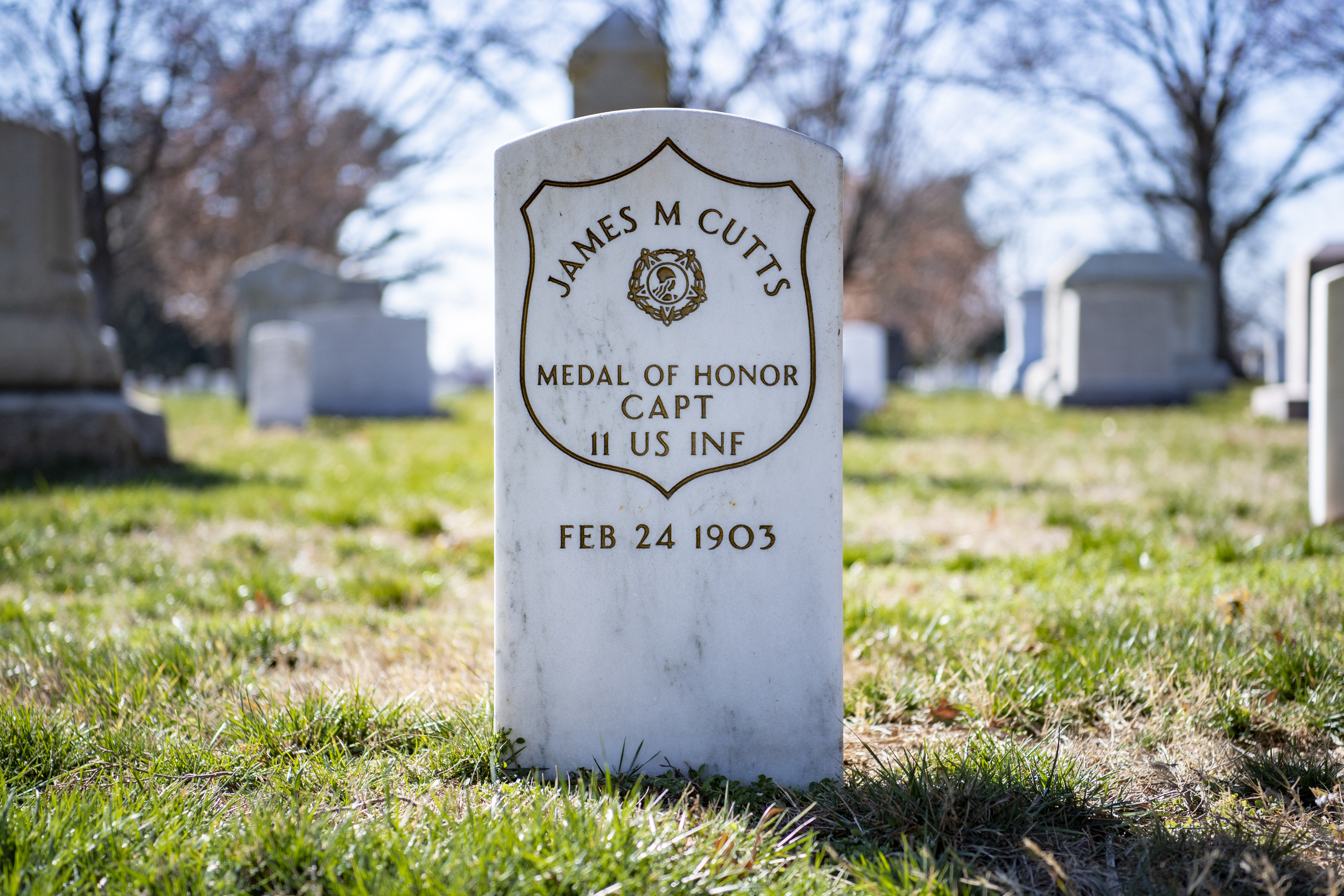
Grave at Arlington National Cemetery

At the start of the American Civil War, Cutts enlisted with the 1st Rhode Island Infantry. Six weeks later, in May 1861, he was appointed as a Captain in the newly created 11th Infantry Regiment. Burnside appointed Cutts as a judge advocate where he served as the prosecutor of Clement Vallandigham.

While serving on the staff of Ambrose Burnside in 1863, Cutts was charged with conduct unbecoming an officer and a gentleman after he allegedly committed several offenses, including criticizing Burnside in letters to the president, constantly arguing with his fellow officers, and attempting to view a married woman dressing in the hotel room next to his by peering over the transom. His appeal reached President Lincoln, who approved the convictions, but reduced the punishment to a written reprimand. Lincoln then wrote Cutts a letter, likely presented in person, indicating that he was sure the "peeping" offense would not be repeated, and urging Cutts to attain his full potential by demonstrating the self-control necessary to avoid pointless quarrels with his peers and superiors. Cutts is reported to have been so chastened that he resolved to reclaim his reputation through battlefield heroism.

Cutts displayed gallantry at the Battle of the Wilderness, the Battle of Spotsylvania and the Second Battle of Petersburg between May 5 and June 18, 1864. He received the Medal of Honor for these actions on May 2, 1891. Claims that Cutts received a "triple" Medal of Honor are not accurate; he received a single award that cited his combined heroism in three separate battles. (Note: As verification, page 70 of Medal of Honor, 1863–1968 indicates that Cutts received one medal in one presentation but on page 69, the details of Thomas Custer's two Medals of Honor include two dates for heroism and two dates for presentations.)

== Medal of Honor citation ==
"For gallantry at Wilderness, Spotsylvania and Petersburg, 1864."

== Continued Army career ==
After the war, Cutts was transferred to the 20th Infantry Regiment. While serving in Louisiana in 1868, Cutts was accused of being intoxicated while on duty, being indecently dressed, and being abusive to the soldiers under his command. Informed that the convening authority for his subsequent court-martial intended to recommend his dismissal from the service, Cutts resigned his commission on June 19, 1868.

== Later life ==
After leaving the Army, Cutts taught rhetoric and oratory at Seton Hall University. In 1882, he moved to Washington to take a position in the War Department, first serving in the surgeon general's office, and later in the office of the Army's adjutant general.

== Death and burial ==
On February 19, 1903, Cutts became ill from uremia on a Washington, D.C. street car while returning to work after his lunch break. He remained at Emergency Hospital until he died in Washington on February 24, 1903. Cutts was buried at Arlington National Cemetery, Section 3, Site 1371-SS.

== Family ==
In 1871, Cutts married Mary E. Wheeler of Baltimore. They were the parents of six children, including Leo, Mary, Arthur, Horace, James and Harold.

== See also ==
- List of American Civil War Medal of Honor recipients: A–F

== Sources ==
=== Newspapers ===
- "Union Veteran Dead: J. Madison Cutts A Victim Of Disease". The Evening Star. Washington, DC. February 25, 1903 – via Newspapers.com.

=== Internet ===
- "James Madison Cutts of Washington, DC". Behind Antietam on the Web. Brian Downey. November 17, 2006.

=== Books ===
- Brown University (1895). Historical Catalogue of Brown University, 1764–1894. Providence, RI: P. S. Remington & Co. – via Google Books.
- Kastenberg, Joshua E. (2011). Law in War, Law as War: Brigadier General Joseph Holt and the Judge Advocate General’s Department in the Civil War and Early Reconstruction, 1861–1865. Durham, NC: Carolina Academic Press. ISBN 978-1-5946-0864-3 – via Google Books.
- Subcommittee on Veterans' Affairs, U.S. Senate Committee on Labor and Public Welfare (1968). Medal of Honor, 1863–1968. Washington, DC: U.S. Government Printing Office – via Internet Archive.
