= SS Dolly Madison =

Liberty ship of WWII

History

United States
- Name: Dolly Madison
- Namesake: Dolley Madison
- Owner: War Shipping Administration (WSA)
- Operator: Merchant & Miners Transportation Co.
- Ordered: as type (EC2-S-C1) hull, MC hull 1530
- Builder: J.A. Jones Construction, Panama City, Florida
- Cost: $2,020,628
- Yard number: 12
- Way number: 6
- Laid down: 20 May 1943
- Launched: 27 September 1943
- Completed: 14 October 1943
- Identification: Call Signal: KXLP
- Fate: Laid up in the National Defense Reserve Fleet, James River Group, 16 May 1946; Sold for commercial use, 15 April 1947

United States
- Name: Dolly Madison
- Operator: Suwanee Fruit & Steamship Corp., Jacksonville, Florida
- Acquired: 23 April 1947
- Fate: Sold, 1949

Honduras
- Name: Dolly Madison
- Owner: Honduras Shipping Co., Tegucigalpa, Honduras
- Acquired: 1949
- Fate: Sold, 1950

Panama
- Name: Archangelos
- Namesake: Archangels
- Owner: Talamanca Cia. Nav., Panama (1950–1955); G.M. Livanos, New York City (1955–1956); Ocean Shipbrokerage, London (1956–1964)
- Acquired: 1950
- Fate: Sprang leak and sank, 15 November 1964
- Notes: reflagged Liberian, in 1954, same owner

General characteristics
- Class & type: Liberty ship; type EC2-S-C1, standard
- Tonnage: 10,865 LT DWT; 7,176 GRT
- Displacement: 3,380 long tons (3,434 t) (light); 14,245 long tons (14,474 t) (max)
- Length: 441 feet 6 inches (135 m) oa; 416 feet (127 m) pp; 427 feet (130 m) lwl
- Beam: 57 feet (17 m)
- Draft: 27 ft 9.25 in (8.4646 m)
- Installed power: 2 × Oil fired 450 °F (232 °C) boilers, operating at 220 psi (1,500 kPa); 2,500 hp (1,900 kW)
- Propulsion: 1 × triple-expansion steam engine, (manufactured by Filer and Stowell, Milwaukee, Wisconsin); 1 × screw propeller
- Speed: 11.5 knots (21.3 km/h; 13.2 mph)
- Capacity: 562,608 cubic feet (15,931 m^{3}) (grain); 499,573 cubic feet (14,146 m^{3}) (bale)
- Complement: 38–62 USMM; 21–40 USNAG
- Armament: Varied by ship; Bow-mounted 3-inch (76 mm)/50-caliber gun; Stern-mounted 4-inch (102 mm)/50-caliber gun; 2–8 × single 20-millimeter (0.79 in) Oerlikon anti-aircraft (AA) cannons and/or, 2–8 × 37-millimeter (1.46 in) M1 AA guns

SS Dolly Madison was a Liberty ship built in the United States during World War II. She was named after Dolley Madison, the wife of James Madison, President of the United States from 1809 to 1817.

== Construction ==
Dolly Madison was laid down on 20 May 1943, under a Maritime Commission (MARCOM) contract, MC hull 1530, by J.A. Jones Construction, Panama City, Florida; she was launched on 27 September 1943.

== History ==
She was allocated to Merchant & Miners Transportation Co., on 14 October 1943. On 16 May 1946, she was laid up in the National Defense Reserve Fleet, in the James River Group, Lee Hall, Virginia. On 15 April 1947, she was sold for commercial use and went through several owners. She was sunk on 15 November 1964, at 24°10′N 111°50′W, after springing a leak.

== Bibliography ==
- "Jones Construction, Panama City FL". www.ShipbuildingHistory.com. 13 October 2010.
- Maritime Administration. "Dolly Madison". Ship History Database Vessel Status Card. U.S. Department of Transportation, Maritime Administration.
- Davies, James (May 2004). "Specifications (As-Built)" (PDF). p. 23.
- "SS Dolly Madison".
