= Richard Cutts =

American politician (1771–1845)

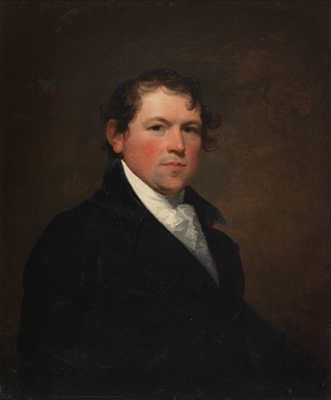
- Portrait by Gilbert Stuart

Second Comptroller of the United States Treasury
- In office March 6, 1817 – March 21, 1829
- Preceded by: None (position created)
- Succeeded by: Isaac Hill

Member of the U.S. House of Representatives from Massachusetts's 14th district
- In office March 4, 1801 – March 3, 1813
- Preceded by: George Thatcher
- Succeeded by: Cyrus King

Personal details
- Born: June 28, 1771 Pepperellborough, Massachusetts Bay, British America (now Saco, Maine)
- Died: April 7, 1845 (aged 73) Washington, D.C., U.S.
- Party: Democratic-Republican
- Spouse: Anna Payne (m. 1804-1832, her death)
- Relations: James Madison (brother-in-law); Dolley Madison (sister-in-law); James M. Cutts (grandson); Adèle Cutts Douglas (granddaughter)
- Children: 7 (including Mary Cutts)
- Education: Harvard University
- Occupation: Merchant

Richard Cutts (June 28, 1771 – April 7, 1845) was an American merchant and politician. A Democratic-Republican, he was most notable for his service as Second Comptroller of the United States Treasury from 1817 to 1829 and a United States representative from Massachusetts from 1801 to 1813.

== Early life ==
Cutts was born Cutts Island on June 28, 1771. The island was near the town of Pepperellborough in Massachusetts Bay's Province of Maine (modern-day Saco, Maine). The fifth of eight children born to Thomas Cutts and Elizabeth Scammon Cutts, he attended the rural schools of Maine and Phillips Academy, Andover. He graduated from Harvard University in 1790, then traveled extensively in Europe. Cutts' father was a shipbuilder and merchant who traded in lumber and other cargoes at ports in several Caribbean islands. Cutts studied law, but rather than pursuing a legal career, he also became a successful trader and merchant.

== Political career ==
A Democratic-Republican, Cutts served in the Massachusetts House of Representatives in 1799 and 1800. In 1800 he was elected to the Seventh U.S. Congress. He was reelected five times and served from March 4, 1801, to March 3, 1813. He was an unsuccessful candidate for reelection in 1812 to the Thirteenth Congress.

During the War of 1812, Cutts was appointed as the federal superintendent general of military supplies, and he served from 1813 to 1817. In 1817, he was appointed Second Comptroller of the Treasury, the first individual to hold this post. He served until March 21, 1829, and was succeeded by Isaac Hill.

== Death and burial ==
In retirement, Cutts was a resident of Washington, D.C. He died in Washington on April 7, 1845. Cutts was buried at St. John's Graveyard, and in 1857 he was reinterred at Oak Hill Cemetery.

== Family ==
In 1804, Cutts married Anna Payne, whose sister Dolley Madison was the wife of Secretary of State (and later, President) James Madison. They were the parents of seven children, five sons and two daughters:

- James Madison (1805–1863)
- Thomas (1806–1838)
- Walter Coles (b. 1808, d. after 1833)
- Richard (1810–1815)
- Dorthea (Dolley) Payne Madison (1811–1838)
- Mary Estelle Elizabeth (1814–1856)
- Richard Dominicus (1817–1883)

Cutts' daughter Mary was close to Dolley Madison and wrote two memoirs about her. Cutts' grandson James M. Cutts was a member of the Union Army during the American Civil War and a recipient of the Medal of Honor. His granddaughter Adèle Cutts Douglas was the second wife of Senator Stephen A. Douglas.

U.S. House of Representatives
Preceded by George Thatcher	Member of the U.S. House of Representatives from Massachusetts's 14th congressional district 1801–1813	Succeeded by Cyrus King
