= Portrait of Dolley Madison =

Painting by Gilbert Stuart

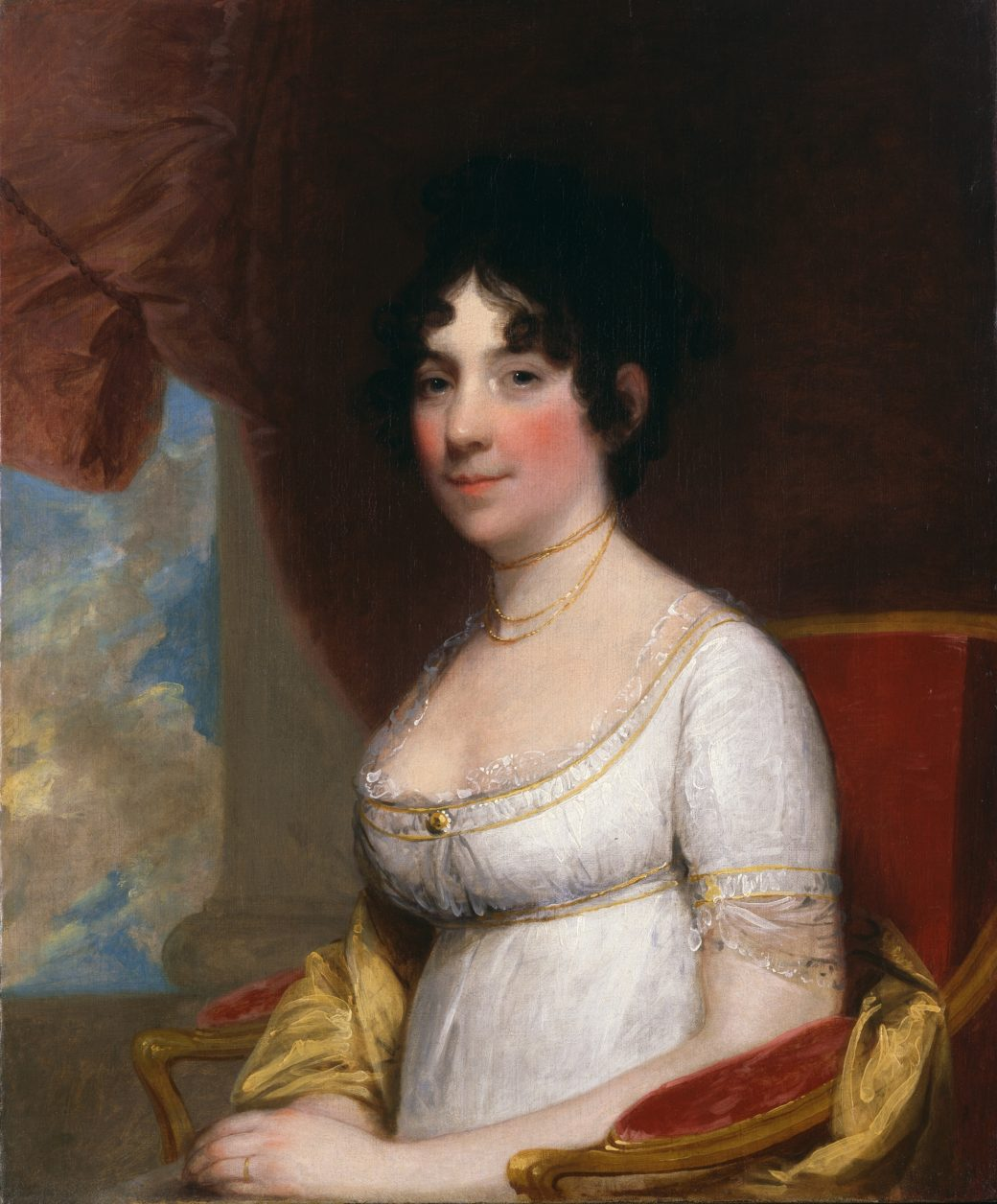
- Artist: Gilbert Stuart
- Year: 1804
- Type: Oil on canvas, portrait painting
- Dimensions: 74.1 cm × 61.2 cm (29.2 in × 24.1 in)
- Location: White House; Washington D.C.

Portrait of Dolley Madison is an 1804 portrait painting by the American artist depicting the future First Lady of the United States Dolley Madison, who had married James Madison in 1794. Stuart was a leading portraitist who had spent many years in London and Dublin before returning to the United States. In 1803 he moved from Philadelphia to Washington D.C.

Stuart also painted her husband, then serving as Secretary of State, around the same time. He succeeded Thomas Jefferson as President in 1809 and held office until 1817. The couple were resident in the White House during the War of 1812, notably during the Burning of Washington by British forces. Today the painting is in the collection of the White House in Washington D.C.

== Bibliography ==
- Allgor, Catherine. Parlor Politics: In which the Ladies of Washington Help Build a City and a Government. University of Virginia Press, 2000.
- Barratt, Carrie Rebora & Miles, Ellen G. Gilbert Stuart. Metropolitan Museum of Art, 2004.
- McLanathan, Richard B. K. Gilbert Stuart. Abrams, 1986.
- Seale, William (ed.) The White House: Actors and Observers. UPNE, 2002.
- Staiti, Paul. Of Arms and Artists: The American Revolution through Painters' Eyes. Bloomsbury Publishing USA, 2016.
