= Richard N. Côté =

American historian

Richard N. Côté (/koʊˈteɪ/ koh-TAY; June 3, 1945 – February 10, 2015) was an American author, social historian, and lecturer. His work included research in Wisconsin and four years researching for the South Carolina Historical Society in the late 1970s to early 1980s. From 1999 to 2002 he published three well-received biographies, of Theodosia Burr Alston, Dolley Madison, and Mary Motte Alston Pringle. Côté was born in Connecticut and attended Butler University. He served in the United States Air Force for six years after graduation.

== Biography ==
=== Youth and education ===
Born June 3, 1945, in Waterbury, Connecticut, to Norman W. and Anne M. (Richall) Côté, he was educated at The Milford School and graduated in 1963 from Amity Regional Senior High School in Woodbridge. One of two children, Côté had an "adventure-filled" childhood. Côté's Dublin-born mother and his Québec-born grandmother, Gertrude Beaudoin Côté, often read to him. He quickly became fascinated with The Harvard Classics and read the complete Encyclopædia Britannica in his teen years. His mother, a part-time journalist, let him use her typewriter, and by the age of twelve, he was typing most of his school papers.

Côté attended Butler University in Indianapolis, Indiana where he majored in political science and journalism and became passionate about photography, Greek and Roman mythology, and writing. In 1964 he was inducted into Sigma Delta Chi, the national journalism fraternity, and was awarded a scholarship for his work as the university's newspaper photographer.

After college, Côté served six years in the United States Air Force. He spent a year at Mather Air Force Base, California, and then volunteered to serve in the Vietnam War. At Da Nang Air Base he served both as a USAF combat news photographer and as a munitions specialist from 1966 to 1967. He spent his final four years in the military as a photographer at Hahn Air Base, Germany.

=== Personal life ===
For enjoyment, he traveled worldwide and collected 19th century engravings and paintings by contemporary Southern artists. He was active in the right to die movement and served as a spokesman for assisted-suicide activist George Exoo.

=== Death ===
Côté died February 10, 2015, in Charleston, South Carolina, after falling down stairs at his home. He was 69.

== Writing career ==
=== Early career ===
While living in Wisconsin in the 1970s, he became interested with the history of Manitowoc County, first settled by German and Polish immigrants in the mid-nineteenth century. His ability to read German Fraktur handwriting led to the transcription of numerous volumes of early German Lutheran church records and tombstones.

After moving to South Carolina in 1979, he was recruited by the South Carolina Historical Society. There he spent four years serving as an archivist, librarian, and grant writer. In 1984 he was recruited to establish a high-precision public records microfilming system for the County of Charleston. He also researched the lives of 18th- and 19th-century Southern planters, their homes, and their slaves.

In the 1990s he turned to more contemporary subjects, including sexual harassment and abuse, motorcycle gangs and drug dealing, entertainment personalities, the American circus industry, religious cults, and deprogrammers. He also authored or co-authored novels based on family relationships, human cloning, politics, and addiction to psychics.

=== Gaining recognition ===
His three biographies, Mary's World: Love, War, and Family Ties in Nineteenth-century Charleston (1999); Theodosia Burr Alston: Portrait of a Prodigy (2002) and Strength and Honor: The Life of Dolley Madison (2004) brought him national recognition. In 2008, "Strength and Honor" was chosen to be translated into the Braille language for the blind by the Library of Congress.

=== Controversies ===
In 1991, after being commissioned to write a documentary history of the South Carolina State Ports Authority, that agency insisted that all references to the port's early use for the slave trade be censored, and that local opposition to its expansion be deleted. Côté demanded that his name be removed from the book. "Agreeing to undertake a scholarly writing project is not the same as agreeing to be a literary whore," he said.

In 1995, Côté was hired by National Press Books through his agent, Robert Eringer, to work as a literary collaborator with Edward Lee Howard, a former CIA spy who defected to Russia after being accused of providing classified information to the Russians. After intensive research and ten days' interviews with Howard in Moscow, Côté returned and wrote Safe House, an authoritative account of Howard's claim to innocence. Unbeknownst to Côté at the time, Eringer was secretly working for the FBI and was using him to acquire information the agency could use against Howard.

=== Awards ===
In 2004, he received the Bobby Gilmer Moss Award in History from the Daughters of the American Revolution for his outstanding contributions to South Carolina history. He has been chosen as a Featured Author by the South Carolina Book Festival; the Carl Sandberg Celebration of Books and Authors in Hendersonville, North Carolina; the Spoleto Festival of the Arts in Charleston, South Carolina; and the Daughters of the American Revolution Museum, Washington.

== Bibliography ==
=== Non-fiction ===
- In Search of Gentle Death: The Fight for Your Right to Die in Dignity (2012). ISBN 978-1-929175-437. Japanese language edition (edited by Yukio Matsuo, 2014): ISBN 9784865431742
- City of Heroes: The Great Charleston Earthquake of 1886 (2005). ISBN 978-1-929175-45-1
- Strength and Honor: The Life of Dolley Madison (2004). ISBN 978-1-929175-20-8.
- Theodosia Burr Alston: Portrait of a Prodigy (2002). ISBN 978-1-929175-31-4
- Mary's World: Love, War, and Family Ties in Nineteenth-century Charleston (1999). ISBN 978-1-929175-04-8
- The Dictionary of South Carolina Biography (1985). ISBN 0-89308-275-9
- Local and Family History in South Carolina: A Bibliography (1981). ISBN 0-89308-200-7

=== Articles ===
- "Fine Wine and Thoroughbreds: The Friendship of Thomas Jefferson and Col. William Alston," Journal of the American Wine Society, Winter, 1996, pp. 112–114.
- "Jewel of the Cotton Fields: Secessionville Manor" (privately printed, 1995).
- "Not Just Medium or Dry: New Zealand's Sophisticated Varietals Take On The World," Journal of the American Wine Society, Winter, 1992, pp. 127–129.

=== Fiction ===
- The Redneck Riviera (2001) ISBN 978-1-929175-34-5

=== Collaborations ===
- No Time For Tears: Transforming Tragedy into Triumph by Dorris R. Wilcox with Richard N. Côté (2000). ISBN 978-1-929175-07-9.
- Patriot Dreams: The Murder of Col. Rich Higgins, by Robin Higgins with Richard N. Côté (1999). ISBN 978-0-940328-24-2.
- Stopping The Train: The Landmark Victory Over Same-Sex Sexual Harassment in the Workplace, by Edwin B. Martin Jr. with Richard N. Côté (1999). ISBN 978-1-929175-08-6.
- Safe House: The Compelling Memoir of the Only CIA Spy to Seek Asylum In Russia By Edward Lee Howard / edited by Richard N. Côté (1995). ISBN 978-1-882605-15-6.
- Preserving The Legacy: Medway Plantation on Back River by Richard N. Cote and research by Agnes L. Baldwin (1993).
