= Cutts & Case Shipyard =

Boatyard in Maryland, USA

Coordinates: 38°41′32″N 76°10′15″W

Cutts & Case Shipyard is a boatyard that specializes in building, design, restorations and maintenance of custom-made wooden pleasure and racing sailboats and yachts, located in Oxford, Maryland in the United States.

== History ==
The business was formerly "Wiley's Shipyard", which was formed and owned by Ralph H. Wiley (1893-1981) around the year 1928. It was here that Wiley built the first Comet sailboat around 1932. The 16 foot sloop was originally designed by Lowndes Johnson and first called the "Crab" before the name "Comet". The Comet sailors compete in regattas within its territory and in such events as the Bermuda International Invitational Race Week, and in National and International Regattas.

Cutts and Case, Inc. bought the shipyard in 1965 from Ralph Wiley, who was retiring from boatbuilding at the age of 73. The newly formed corporation provided Wiley an office as a consultant. Up to at least 1968, the building complex was still named "Wiley's Shipyard".
