= John Payne Todd =

Son of US First Lady Dolley Madison and her husband John Todd JR

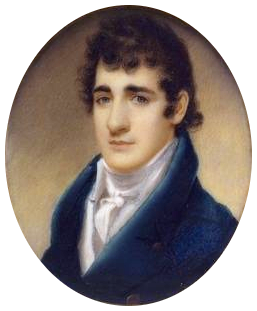
- Painting of John Payne Todd by Joseph Wood ca.1817
- Born: February 29, 1792; Philadelphia, Pennsylvania
- Died: January 16, 1852 (aged 59); Washington, District of Columbia
- Education: Bishop John Carroll's Catholic Boarding School
- Alma mater: St. Mary's College
- Parent(s): John Todd Jr. Dolley Payne Todd Madison; James Madison (step-father)

John Payne Todd (February 29, 1792 – January 16, 1852) was an American secretary. He was the first son of Dolley Payne and John Todd Jr. His father and younger brother died in the 1793 Philadelphia yellow fever epidemic, which killed nearly 10 percent of the city's population. His mother remarried the following year, to the older James Madison, the future president of the United States.

Madison adopted Todd at age two and tried to help him in what developed as a difficult life. Believed to be alcoholic, Todd was repeatedly jailed for shooting incidents, and ran up debts in gambling. His parents bailed him out of debtors' prison, mortgaging Madison's Montpelier to raise the money. His stepfather had him manage Montpelier at one point, but Todd was unsuccessful. Todd died of typhoid fever less than three years after his mother's death of old age.

== Early life and education ==
John Payne Todd was the first son of Dolley Payne and John Todd Jr. He had a younger brother, William Temple Todd. Both his brother and father died the same day of yellow fever in the 1793 epidemic. The following year, his 26-year-old widowed mother married the future President James Madison, then 43. He adopted Payne. Madison sent Todd as a youth for eight years to St. Mary's Seminary, a Catholic boarding school in Baltimore, but he seemed unsuited for academic work.

== Career ==
As an adult, Todd never settled into a career. Believed to be alcoholic, he was belligerent, and was repeatedly convicted of shooting incidents and sentenced to serve jail time for assaults and disruption of the peace. Twice he was sent to debtors' prison, and his stepfather had to cover much of his debts and bail bonds by mortgaging his Montpelier plantation. During his second term, Madison assigned his stepson as secretary to an official delegation to Europe, but the 21-year-old Todd spent much of the time drinking, shooting and acquiring art. For a time, Madison assigned him to manage operations at Montpelier, but Todd was not successful.

== Later life ==
Because of his problems, Todd contributed to his mother's late life poverty, as she and Madison had sacrificed for him during their lives. Dolley Madison sold the family's Montpelier plantation to cover his debts and gain some living expenses. But, she was still devoted to him. She lived with and was cared for by her niece Anne Cutts, and bequeathed her half of her estate. Todd threatened to sue Cutts to gain more of his mother's estate, all that was left from money she received for selling Madison's papers to the Library of Congress. She died at age 81.

Todd survived his mother by two and a half years. She willed her remaining enslaved people to him. He was nearly 60 when he died of typhoid fever on January 16, 1852, in Washington, DC. He is buried in the Congressional Cemetery.

Payne Todd's will provided for the manumission of all his slaves upon his death. His debts delayed their release, but the Taylor family petitioned for freedom from James C. McGuire, administrator of the estate, which they were granted in 1853. They continued to live in Washington, where Ralph Taylor had been a servant to Dolley Madison. He was joined by his wife Catherine and children, who had been living and working on Todd's estate.
