= Dolley Madison =

First Lady of the United States from 1809 to 1817

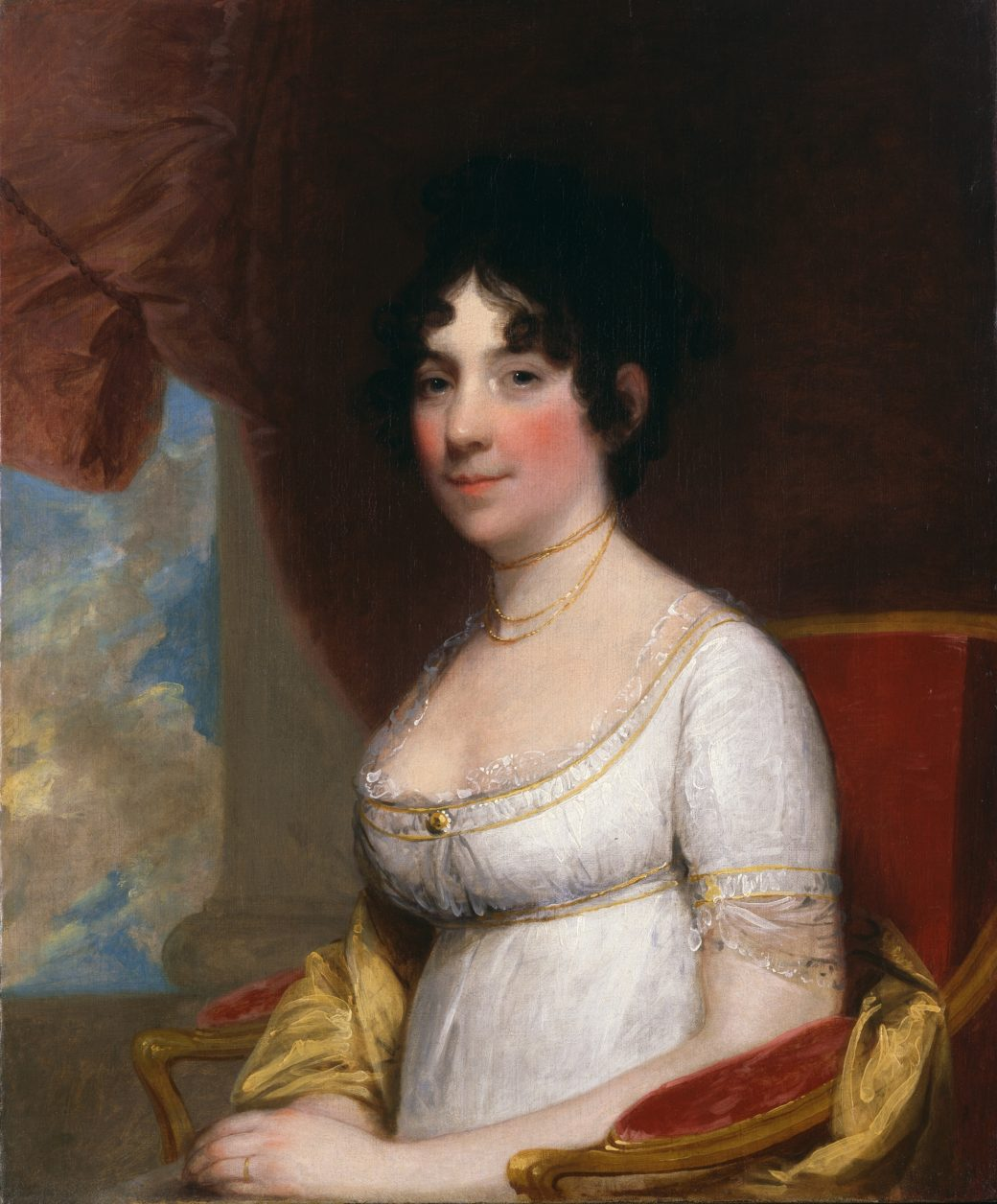
- Portrait of Dolley Madison by Gilbert Stuart, 1804

First Lady of the United States
- In role March 4, 1809 – March 4, 1817
- President: James Madison
- Preceded by: Martha Randolph (acting)
- Succeeded by: Elizabeth Monroe

Personal details
- Born: Dolley Payne; May 20, 1768 Guilford County, North Carolina, British America
- Died: July 12, 1849 (aged 81) Washington, D.C., U.S.
- Resting place: Montpelier, Virginia, U.S. 38°13′07.5″N 78°10′06.0″W
- Spouses: John Todd (m. 1790; died 1793) James Madison (m. 1794; died 1836)
- Children: John; William

Dolley Todd Madison (née Payne; May 20, 1768 – July 12, 1849) was the wife of James Madison, the fourth president of the United States from 1809 to 1817. She was known for holding Washington social functions to which she invited members of both political parties, essentially spearheading the concept of bipartisan cooperation. Previous founders such as Thomas Jefferson would only meet with members of one party at a time, and politics could often be a violent affair resulting in physical altercations and even duels. Madison helped to create the idea that members of each party could amicably socialize, network, and negotiate with each other without violence. Through these innovations, Dolley Madison did much to define the role of the president's spouse, known only much later by the title First Lady—a function she had sometimes performed earlier for the widowed Thomas Jefferson.

Madison also helped to furnish the newly constructed White House. When the British set fire to it in 1814, she was credited with saving Gilbert Stuart's 1796 portrait of George Washington; she directed her personal slave Paul Jennings to save it. In widowhood, she often lived in poverty aggravated by her son John Payne Todd's alcoholism and mismanagement of their Montpelier plantation. To relieve her debts, she sold off the plantation, its remaining enslaved people, and her late husband's papers.

Surveys of historians conducted periodically by the Siena College Research Institute since 1982 have consistently found Madison to rank among the six most highly regarded first ladies by the assessments of historians.

== Early life and first marriage (1768–1793) ==
Dolley Payne was born on May 20, 1768, (Note: Madison later gave her birth date as 1771 or 1772, a misstatement that Historian Côté describes as confusing biographers for "nearly a century.") to Mary Coles and John Payne Jr. and lived with her family in a log cabin in New Garden, Guilford County (now Greensboro), North Carolina. Her parents had married in 1761, uniting two prominent Virginian families. Little is known about the family's life before 1793, when Madison was 25, because few documents have survived; Madison's earliest known letter dates to 1783. Mary Coles was from a Quaker family and two years after their marriage the couple applied for membership in the Cedar Creek meeting. The application was considered for a very lengthy time before they were admitted in 1765. John Payne would become a fervent member of the faith. The family had moved to New Garden, a Quaker community, in 1765. Madison was the family's third child and first daughter. The family had an enslaved nursemaid.

In early 1769, the Paynes returned to Virginia for reasons that are unclear. Historians Catherine Allgor and Richard N. Côté have speculated in their biographical works on her that the family may have wanted to return to their extended family, become uncomfortable with the religion, faced local opposition, or failed at farming or business. Madison would later downplay her North Carolina birth, claiming herself to be a Virginian born when visiting an uncle in North Carolina. The family returned to Cedar Creek, where within four years they had moved at least twice. They eventually settled on a 176-acre (71 ha) farm several miles outside of Scotchtown. Madison grew up on the farm, working the land with the rest of her family. She was given a strict Quaker upbringing and education, which Côté describes her as "chafing" under.

Madison grew close to her extended family in the area. She had three younger sisters (Lucy, Anna, and Mary) and four brothers (Walter, William Temple, Isaac, and John), two of whom were younger. Her father did not participate in the American Revolutionary War, as his faith practiced pacifism, and Allgor writes that Madison was seemingly little affected by it. By 1783 John Payne had emancipated his enslaved people, as did numerous slaveholders in the Upper South. Payne, as a Quaker, had long encouraged manumission, but the act was not legal in Virginia until 1782.

When Madison was 15, Payne moved his family to Philadelphia, at the time the second largest American city. They lived at 57 North Third Street, and transferred to the local Northern District Meeting. While living there, Madison often visited Haddonfield, New Jersey, where many Quakers lived. She also met Eliza Collins and Dorothea Abrahams in Philadelphia, with whom she became lifelong friends. During her early years, Payne likely received formal education, though it is not known what this was. Allgor concludes that it was likely better than most Americans at the time, while Côté notes that it was probably "no more than a basic" one. Madison grew into a young woman who Côté writes was described "as one of the fairest of the fair".

Upon the family's move to Philadelphia, John had attempted to build a career as a starch manufacturer, but the business failed in 1789. This was seen as a "weakness" at his Quaker meetings, for which he was expelled. He was devastated by this failure and died on October 24, 1792. Mary Payne initially made ends meet by opening her home as a boardinghouse beginning in 1791. Before his death, John had arranged Madison's marriage to John Todd, a Philadelphia lawyer. According to Allgor, Madison had rejected marriage with Todd previously and John's marriage arrangement was "manipulation". Conversely, Côté considers their marriage to have been "for love, not just duty". They were married on January 7, 1790, at a Quaker meeting house. Madison's friend Eliza Collins was her bridesmaid. The couple moved several blocks away into a high-quality neighborhood.

=== Marriage and family ===
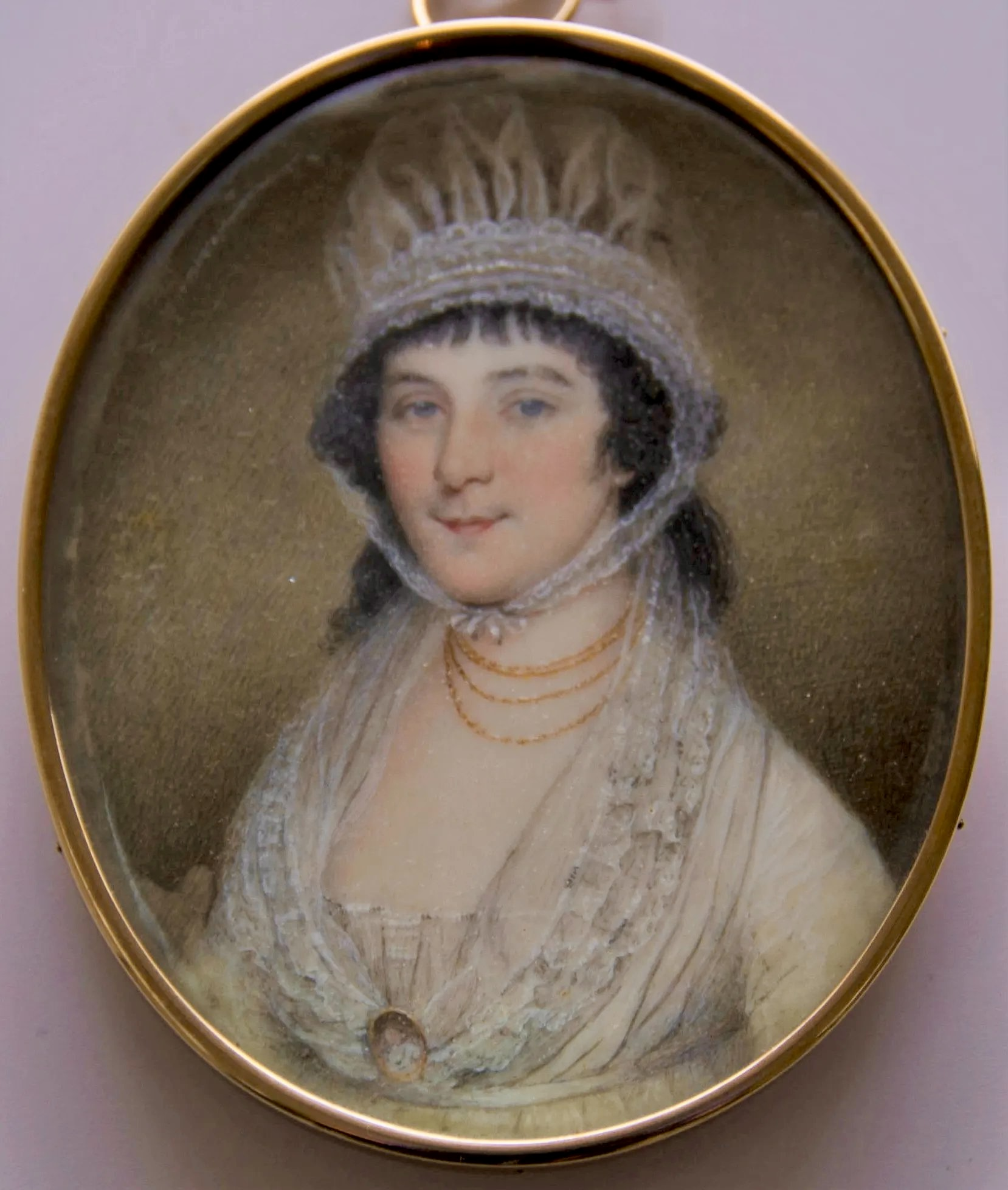
Miniature of Dolley in 1794 by James Peale

Madison and Todd had two sons, John Payne (called Payne, born February 29, 1792) and William Temple (born July 4, 1793). According to Allgor, their marriage grew into a "a loving happy partnership." Madison's sister Anna Payne moved in with them.

In August 1793, a yellow fever epidemic broke out in Philadelphia, killing 5,019 people in four months. Madison was hit particularly hard, losing her husband, son William, mother-in-law, and father-in-law. Two of her older brothers died just two years later, and she "never fully recovered" from the emotional toll of these deaths.

While undergoing the loss of much of her family, she also had to take care of her surviving son without financial support. Her husband had left her money in his will, but the executor, her brother-in-law, withheld the funds, and she sued him for what she was owed. Aaron Burr, who had once stayed at the boarding house of Madison's mother, assisted her in these efforts, offering legal advice. In a will, written around that time, Burr was named the guardian of Madison's only surviving child.

== Second marriage (1794–1800) ==
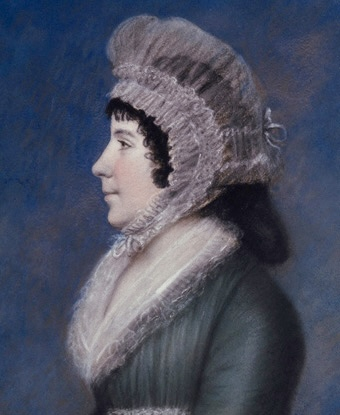
Pastel portrait of Dolley by James Sharples, Sr. - Madison was painted in pastels by James Sharples, Sr. in 1797, when she was twenty-nine years old. At that time, Dolley lived in Virginia at the Montpelier plantation. Her second husband, James Madison, was active in Virginia politics.

Madison, at the time named Dolley Todd, soon met James Madison. Their relationship was facilitated by Aaron Burr, a longtime friend of Madison. In May 1794, Burr made the formal introduction between the young widow and Madison, who at 43 was a longstanding bachelor 17 years her senior. A brisk courtship followed, and by August she had accepted his marriage proposal. As he was not a Quaker, she was expelled from the Society of Friends for marrying outside her faith, after which she began attending Episcopal services. Despite her Quaker upbringing, there is no evidence that she disapproved of James as a slaveholder. They were married on September 15, 1794, and lived in Philadelphia for the next three years.

In 1797, after eight years in the House of Representatives, James Madison retired from politics. He returned with his family to Montpelier, the Madison family plantation in Orange County, Virginia. There they expanded the house and settled in. Thomas Jefferson, in 1800 elected president of the United States, asked James Madison to serve as his secretary of state. Madison accepted and moved with Dolley Madison, her son Payne, her sister Anna, and their domestic servants (who were all enslaved people) to Washington. They took a large house on F Street, as Dolley Madison believed that entertaining would be important in the new capital.

== In Washington (1801–1817) ==
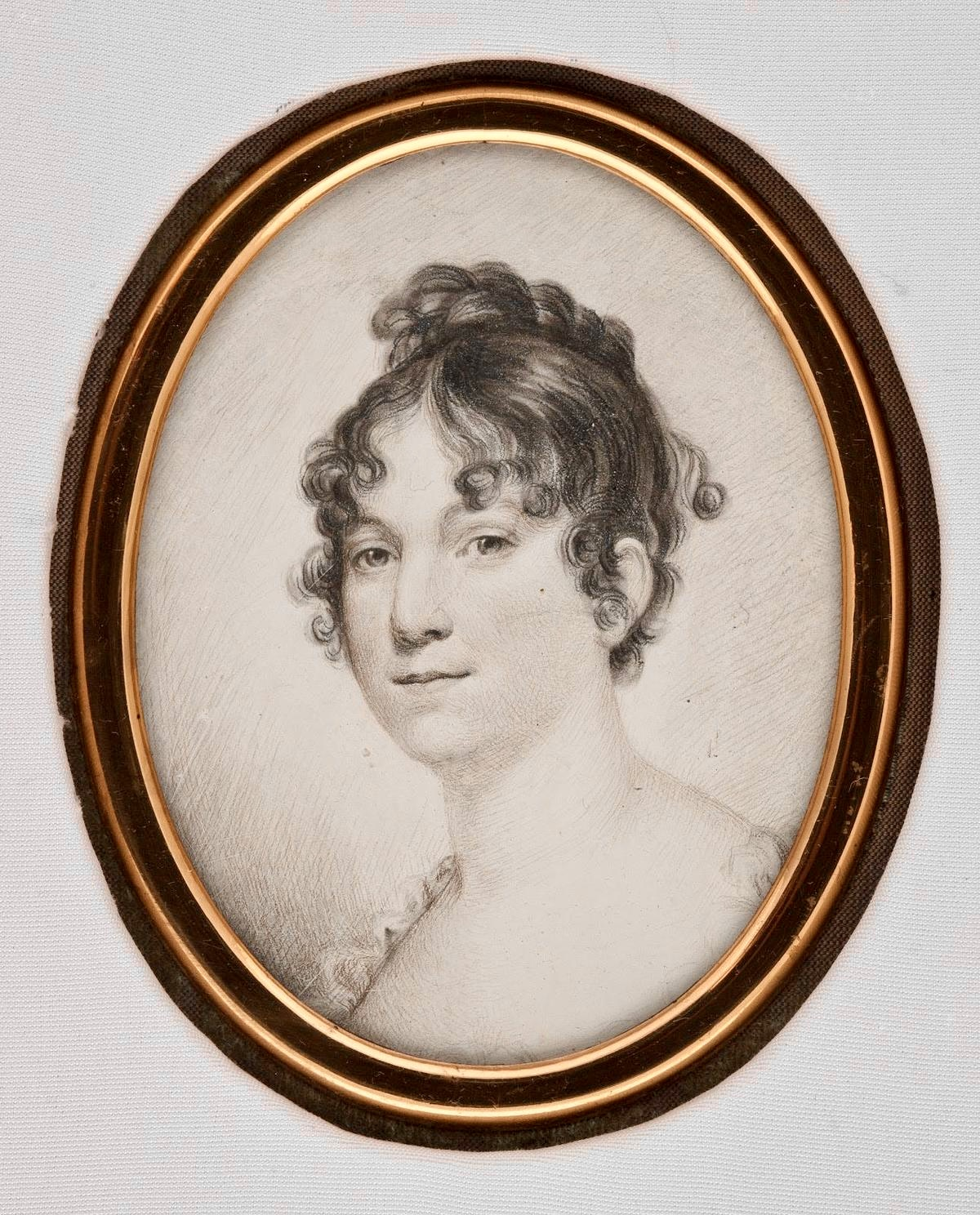
Portrait of Dolley Madison by Thomas Christian Lubbers, located at the National Portrait Gallery.

Madison worked with the architect Benjamin Henry Latrobe to furnish the White House, the first official residence built for the president of the United States. She sometimes served as widower Jefferson's hostess for official ceremonial functions. Madison would become a crucial part of the Washington social circle, befriending the wives of numerous diplomats, among them Sarah Martinez de Yrujo, wife of the ambassador of Spain, and Marie-Angelique Turreau, wife of the French ambassador. Her charm precipitated a diplomatic crisis, called the Merry Affair, after Jefferson escorted Madison to the dining room instead of the wife of Anthony Merry, English diplomat to the U.S., in a major faux pas.

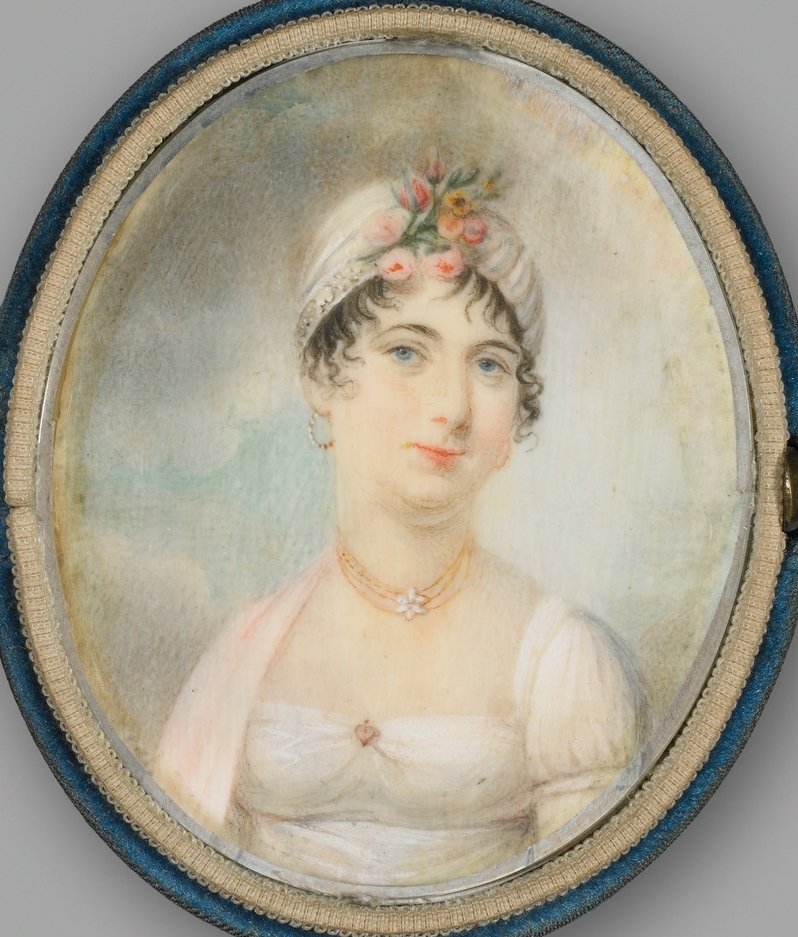
Watercolor-on-ivory miniature of Dolley Madison at the Yale University Art Gallery.

In the approach to the 1808 presidential election, with Thomas Jefferson ready to retire, the Democratic-Republican caucus nominated James Madison to succeed him. He was elected the fourth President of the United States, serving two terms from 1809 to 1817, and Dolley Madison became the official White House hostess. She had often been the unofficial hostess at the White House during Jefferson's presidency. The term first lady was not yet in use, but her role as hostess became official when her husband assumed the presidency. Madison helped define the official functions, decorated the Executive Mansion, and welcomed visitors in her drawing room. She was renowned for her social graces and hospitality, and contributed to her husband's popularity as president. She was the only First Lady given an honorary seat on the floor of Congress, and the first American to respond to a telegraph message. In 1812, James was reelected. Later that year, he delivered a war request to Congress, signalling the beginning of the War of 1812.

=== Burning of Washington (1814) ===
The United States declared war in 1812 and invaded British North America in 1813, and a British force attacked Washington in 1814. As it approached and the White House staff prepared to flee, Dolley ordered Paul Jennings, her personal servant, to save the Stuart painting, a copy of the Lansdowne Portrait, of George Washington. She wrote in a letter to her sister at 3 o'clock in the afternoon of August 23:

Our kind friend Mr. Carroll has come to hasten my departure, and in a very bad humor with me, because I insist on waiting until the large picture of General Washington is secured, and it requires to be unscrewed from the wall. The process was found too tedious for these perilous moments; I have ordered the frame to be broken and the canvas taken out. . . . It is done, and the precious portrait placed in the hands of two gentlemen from New York for safe keeping. On handing the canvas to the gentlemen in question, Messrs. Barker and Depeyster, Mr. Sioussat cautioned them against rolling it up, saying that it would destroy the portrait. He was moved to this because Mr. Barker started to roll it up for greater convenience for carrying.

Popular accounts during and after the war years portrayed Dolley Madison as the one who removed the painting, and she became a national heroine. An 1865 memoir by Jennings stated that she had ordered him to save the painting, and that Jean Pierre Sioussat and a gardener, McGraw, were the ones who removed it from the wall. Early twentieth-century historians noted that Sioussat had directed the servants, many of whom were enslaved people, in the crisis, and that they were the ones who actually preserved the painting.

Dolley Madison hurried away in her waiting carriage, along with other families fleeing the city. They went to Georgetown and the next day crossed over the Potomac into Virginia. When the couple returned to Washington, the White House was uninhabitable and Dolley and James Madison moved into The Octagon House.

== At Montpelier (1817–1837) ==
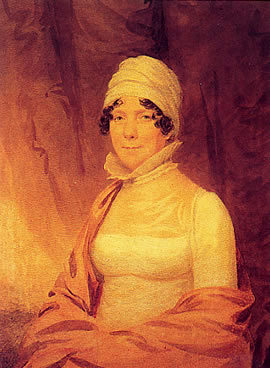
Madison at the end of her tenure as First Lady in 1817.

Dolley and James Madison returned to the Montpelier plantation in Orange County, Virginia, on April 6, 1817, a month after his retirement from the presidency.

In 1830, Dolley Madison's son Payne Todd, who had never found a career, went to debtors' prison in Philadelphia, and the Madisons sold land in Kentucky and mortgaged half the Montpelier plantation to pay his debts.

James Madison died at Montpelier on June 28, 1836. He was 85 years old. Dolley remained at Montpelier for a year. Her niece Anna Payne moved in with her, and Todd came for a lengthy stay. During this time, Madison organized and copied her husband's papers. Congress authorized $55,000 as payment for editing and publishing seven volumes of these papers, including James's notes on the 1787 convention.

In the fall of 1837, Dolley returned to Washington, charging Todd with the care of the plantation. She and her sister Anna moved into a house, bought by Anna and her husband Richard Cutts, on Lafayette Square. Dolley took Paul Jennings with her as a butler, forcing him to leave his wife and children in Virginia.

== In Washington (1837–1849) ==
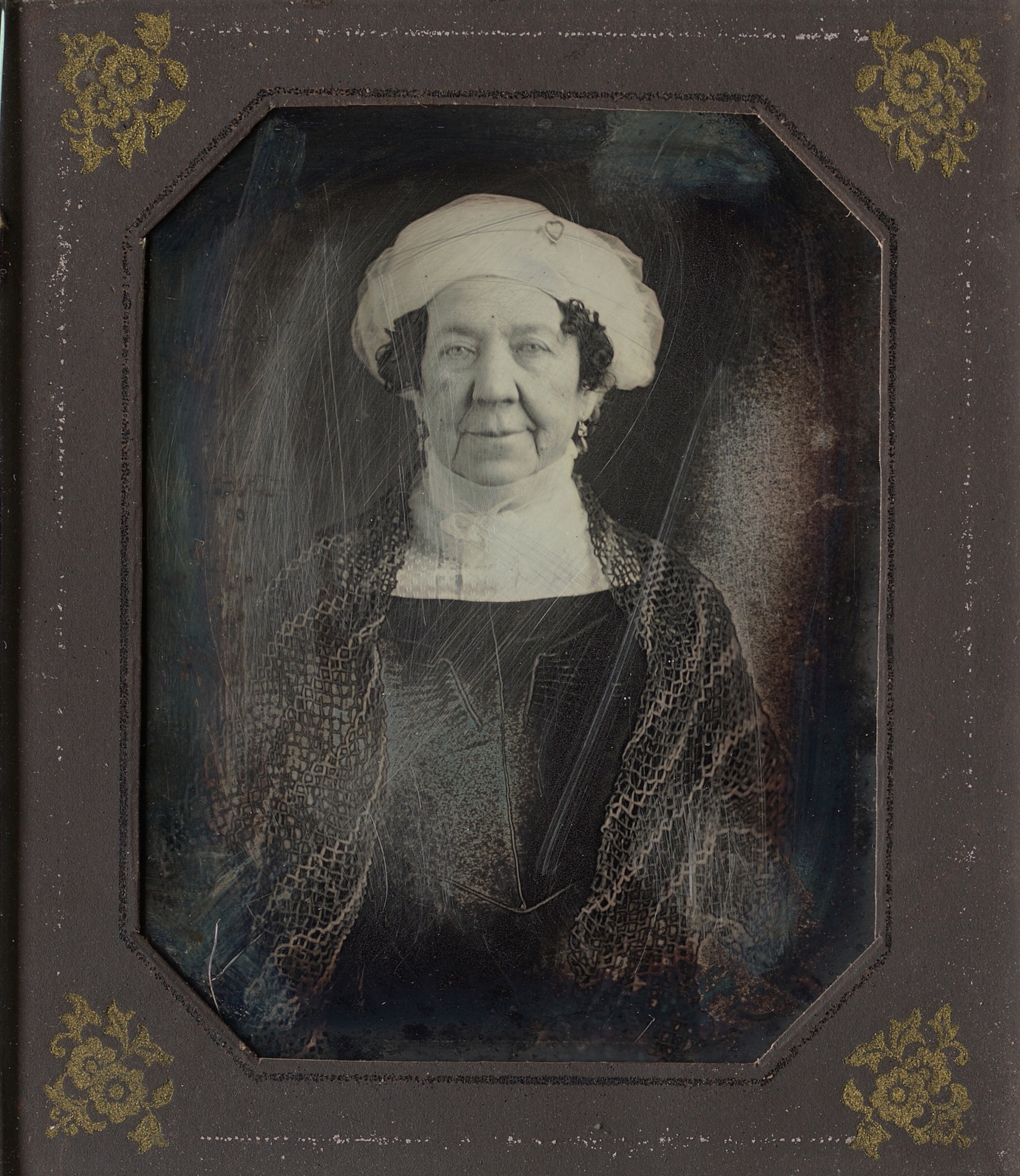
A daguerreotype of Madison in 1846, by John Plumbe Jr.

While Dolley Madison was living in Washington, Payne Todd was unable to manage the plantation due to alcoholism and related illness. She tried to raise money by selling the rest of the president's papers, but was unable to find a buyer. Jennings attempted to negotiate purchasing his freedom; she had previously written a will in 1841 which would free Jennings after her death, though not her other slaves. She instead sold him to an insurance agent for $200 (~$7,167 in 2025) in 1846. Six months later, Senator Daniel Webster intervened to buy him from the new owner and gave Jennings his freedom, for which he repaid the senator in work. Madison sold Montpelier, its remaining enslaved people, and the furnishings to pay off outstanding debts. Jennings later recalled in his memoir,

In the last days of her life, before Congress purchased her husband's papers, she was in a state of absolute poverty, and I think sometimes suffered for the necessaries of life. While I was a servant to Mr. Webster, he often sent me to her with a market-basket full of provisions, and told me whenever I saw anything in the house that I thought she was in need of, to take it to her. I often did this, and occasionally gave her small sums from my own pocket, though I had years before bought my freedom of her.

In 1848, Congress agreed to buy the rest of James Madison's papers for the sum of $22,000 or $25,000.

In 1845, Dolley Madison was baptized into St. John's Episcopal Church, Lafayette Square in Washington, D.C.

On February 28, 1844, Madison was with President John Tyler while aboard the USS Princeton when a "Peacemaker" cannon exploded in the process of being fired. While Secretaries of State and Navy Abel P. Upshur and Thomas Walker Gilmer, Tyler's future father-in-law David Gardiner and three others were killed, Tyler and Madison escaped unharmed.

She was photographed on at least two occasions, making her the earliest First Lady to have a surviving photograph, with four daguerreotypes known to survive as of 2021. Three photographs were taken on July 4, 1848, including one featuring her niece, Anna Payne; the final one was taken in 1849, featuring President James Polk, his wife Sarah Polk, future President James Buchanan and future First Lady Harriet Lane.

Dolley Madison died at her home in Washington in 1849, at the age of 81. She was first buried in the Congressional Cemetery, Washington, D.C., but later was re-interred at Montpelier next to her husband. She was buried in an air-tight Fisk metallic burial case with a glass window plate for viewing the face of the deceased.

== Honors ==
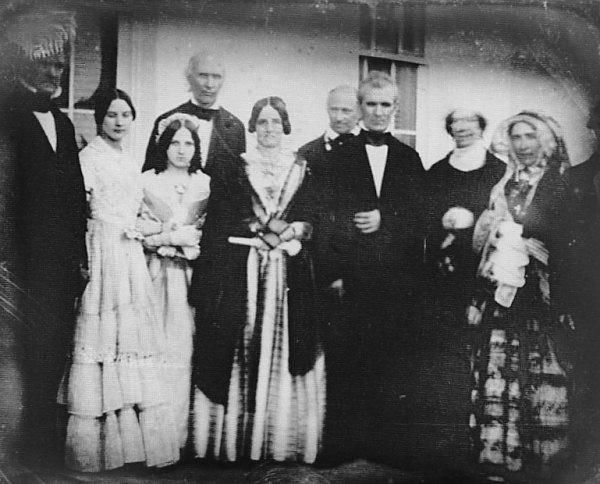
Madison (second to right) on the portico of the White House alongside Secretary of State James Buchanan, future first lady Harriet Lane, president James Polk and his wife, Sarah.

During World War II the Liberty ship SS Dolly Madison was built in Panama City, Florida, and named in her honor.

Madison was a member of the inaugural class of Virginia Women in History in 2000.

== Spelling of her name ==
External videos
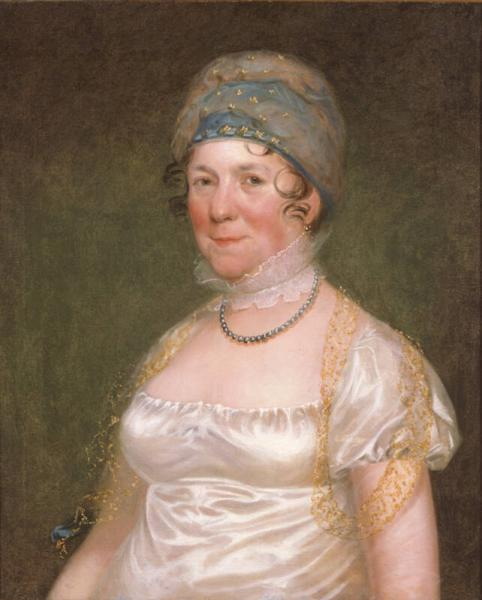
- First Lady Dolley Madison, C-SPAN

In the past, biographers and others stated that her given name was Dorothea, after her aunt, or Dorothy, and that Dolley was a nickname. But her birth was registered with the New Garden Friends Meeting under the name Dolley, and her will of 1841 states "I, Dolly P. Madison". According to manuscript evidence and the scholarship of recent biographers, Dollie appears to have been her given name at birth. Printed publications of her day, however, especially newspapers, tended to spell it Dolly: for example, the Hallowell (Maine) Gazette, February 8, 1815, p. 4, notes that Congress had allowed "Madame Dolly Madison" an allowance of $14,000 to purchase new furniture; and the New Bedford (MA) of March 3, 1837, p. 2, citing important papers from her late husband, said that "Mrs. Dolly Madison" would be paid by the Senate for these historical manuscripts. Several magazines of that time also used the Dolly spelling, such as The Knickerbocker, February 1837, p. 165; as did many popular magazines of the 1860s–1890s. She was called "Mistress Dolly" in an essay in Munsey's Magazine in 1896. Her grandniece Lucia Beverly Cutts, in her Memoirs and letters of Dolly Madison: wife of James Madison, president of the United States (1896), uses Dolly consistently throughout.

== Representation in other media ==
- Cecil B. DeMille, The Buccaneer, 1938 film, played by Spring Byington
- Irving Stone, Magnificent Doll (1946), film directed by Frank Borzage, Universal Pictures, played by Ginger Rogers
- Brown, Rita Mae, Dolley: A Novel of Dolley Madison in Love and War (New York: Bantam Books, 1994); reprint, Presidential Wives Series (Huntington, NY: Nova History Publications, 2001)

== Legacy ==
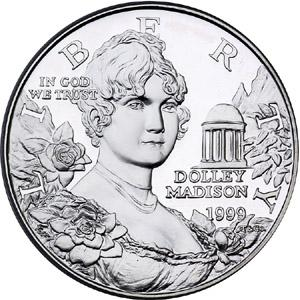
The 1999 Dolley Madison silver dollar

- To commemorate the 150th anniversary of her death, the Dolley Madison silver dollar was issued by the U.S. Mint in 1999.
- In 2024, the National Portrait Gallery obtained a daguerreotype of Dolley Madison, taken about 1846 by John Plumbe Jr., that is the earliest known photograph of any U.S. first lady.
- Virginia State Route 123 is named Dolley Madison Boulevard from McLean, Virginia to George Washington Memorial Parkway.
- The SS Dolley Madison, a Liberty Ship built in World War II, was named for her.

== Regard by historians ==
Since 1982 Siena College Research Institute has periodically conducted surveys asking historians to assess American first ladies according to a cumulative score on the independent criteria of their background, value to the country, intelligence, courage, accomplishments, integrity, leadership, being their own women, public image, and value to the president. Consistently, Madison has ranked among the six-most highly regarded first ladies in these surveys. In terms of cumulative assessment, Madison has been ranked:

- 4th-best of 42 in 1982
- 4th-best of 37 in 1993
- 3rd-best of 38 in 2003
- 6th-best of 38 in 2008
- 4th-best of 39 in 2014
- 5th-best of 40 in 2020

In the 2008 Siena Research Institute survey, Madison was ranked in the top-four of all criteria, ranking the 4th-highest in value to the country and 5th-highest in public image. In the 2014 survey, Madison and her husband were ranked the 4th-highest out of 39 first couples in terms of being a "power couple".

Honorary titles
Preceded by Martha Randolph; Acting	First Lady of the United States; 1809–1817	Succeeded by Elizabeth Monroe
