= Cutts baronets =

Extinct baronetcy in the Baronetage of England

The Cutts Baronetcy, of Childerley in the County of Cambridge, was a title in the Baronetage of England. It was created on 21 June 1660 for John Cutts. The title became extinct on his death in 1670. The Cutts estates devolved on his kinsman and namesake John Cutts, who was elevated to the peerage as Baron Cutts in 1690.

The Cutts family descended from Sir John Cutts, originally of Thaxted, Essex, who settled at Childerley in Cambridgeshire during the reign of Henry VIII and served as High Sheriff of Cambridgeshire and Huntingdonshire in 1516. Sir John's grandson and namesake Sir John Cutts was the father of the first Baronet.

== Cutts baronets, of Childerley (1660) ==
Escutcheon of the Cutts baronets of Childerley

- Sir John Cutts, 1st Baronet (c. 1634–1670)
