= Nat Turner =

American slave rebellion leader (1800–1831)

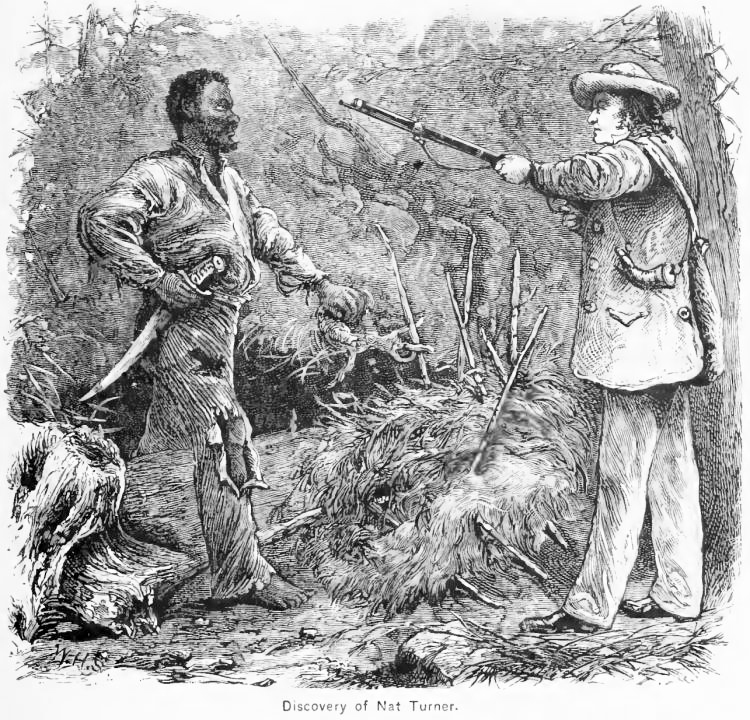
- Discovery of Nat Turner by William Henry Shelton, 1882
- Born: October 2, 1800; Southampton County, Virginia, U.S.
- Died: November 11, 1831 (aged 31); Jerusalem, Virginia, U.S.
- Cause of death: Execution by hanging
- Known for: Nat Turner's slave rebellion
- Criminal charges: Conspiring to rebel and make insurrection
- Criminal penalty: Death

Nat Turner (October 2, 1800 – November 11, 1831) was an enslaved Black American carpenter and preacher who led a four-day rebellion of both slave and free Black people in Southampton County, Virginia, in August 1831. Turner's Rebellion resulted in the death of 55 White people before state militias suppressed the uprising. At the same time, as many as 120 Black men, women, and children, many of whom were not involved in the revolt, were killed by soldiers and local mobs in retaliation.

Turner was captured in October 1831 and, after a trial, was executed in November. Before his execution, he told his story to attorney Thomas Ruffin Gray, who published The Confessions of Nat Turner in November 1831.

In 2002, scholar Molefi Kete Asante included Nat Turner on his list of 100 Greatest African Americans. Turner has been depicted in films, literature, and plays, as well as many scholarly works.

== Early life ==
Turner was born into slavery on October 2, 1800, in Southampton County, Virginia. Southampton County was a rural plantation area with more Black people than White. Benjamin Turner, the man who held Nat and his family as slaves, called the infant Nat in his records. Even when grown, the young man was known simply as Nat, but after the 1831 rebellion, he was widely referred to as Nat Turner.

Turner knew little about the background of his father, who was believed to have escaped from slavery when Turner was a child. However, Turner grew up "much attached to his grandmother".

Turner learned to read and write at a young age. He was identified as having "natural intelligence and quickness of apprehension, surpassed by few". He grew up deeply religious and was often seen fasting, praying, or immersed in reading the stories of the Bible.

Benjamin Turner died in 1810, and his son Samuel inherited Nat. When he was 21, Nat Turner escaped from Samuel Turner, but he returned a month later after receiving a vision in which the Spirit appeared to him and told him that he "had [his] wishes directed to the things of this world, and not to the kingdom of Heaven, and that [he] should return to the service of [his] earthly master". In 1830, Joseph Travis purchased Turner; Turner later recalled that Travis was "a kind master" who "placed the greatest confidence" in him.

An 1831 reward notice described Turner as:

5 feet 6 or 8 inches [168–173 cm] high, weighs between 150 and 160 pounds [68–73 kg], rather "bright" [light-colored] complexion, but not a mulatto, broad shoulders, larger flat nose, large eyes, broad flat feet, rather knockneed [sic], walks brisk and active, hair on the top of the head very thin, no beard, except on the upper lip and the top of the chin, a scar on one of his temples, also one on the back of his neck, a large knot on one of the bones of his right arm, near the wrist, produced by a blow.

== Visions and religious activities ==
Turner often conducted religious services, preaching the Bible to his fellow slaves, who dubbed him "The Prophet". In addition to Blacks, Turner garnered some White followers such as Ethelred T. Brantley, whom Turner baptized after convincing him to "cease from his wickedness".

Turner had visions that he interpreted as messages from God, which influenced his life. The historian Patrick Breen stated, "Nat Turner thought that God used the natural world as a backdrop in front of which he placed signs and omens." Breen further states that Turner claimed to possess a gift of prophecy and could interpret these divine revelations. His deep spiritual commitment served as a significant influence on slaves within the surrounding plantations in Virginia.

Historian David Allmendinger notes that Turner had ten different supernatural experiences between 1822 and 1828. These included appearances of both the Spirit communicating through a religious language and scripture along with the visions of the Holy Ghost. While working in Moore's field on May 12, Turner said he "heard a loud noise in the heavens...and the Spirit instantly appeared to me and said the Serpent was loosened, and Christ had laid down the yoke he had borne for the sins of men, and that I should take it on and fight against the Serpent, for the time was fast approaching when the first should be last and the last should be first". In 1824, Turner had a second vision while working in the fields for Thomas Moore, recalling, "The Saviour was about to lay down the yoke he had borne for the sins of men, and the great day of judgment was at hand". By the spring of 1828, Turner was convinced that he "was ordained for some great purpose in the hands of the Almighty".

Turner was motivated by strong convictions, at least partly inspired by his religious beliefs, to organize his fellow slaves against enslavement. Historian and theologian Joseph Dreis says, "In connecting this vision to the motivation for his rebellion, Turner makes it clear that he sees himself as participating in the confrontation between God's Kingdom and the anti-Kingdom that characterized his social-historical context." After Turner viewed the solar eclipse in 1831, he was certain that God wanted the revolt to commence.

Historian Jean W. Cash notes that, despite Turner’s revelations being dismissed by some historians for appearing delusional or incoherent, they fit a pattern of leadership focused on a biblical interpretation of prophetic divine wrath. According to Cash, Turner's visions appear to be rooted in his understanding of apocalyptic Christian theology, where Old Testament themes of revolutionary reform and divine justice are prevalent. Cash notes that Turner’s self-conception as a prophet was a product of a coherent religious worldview at that time, as opposed to him having mental instability.

== Rebellion ==
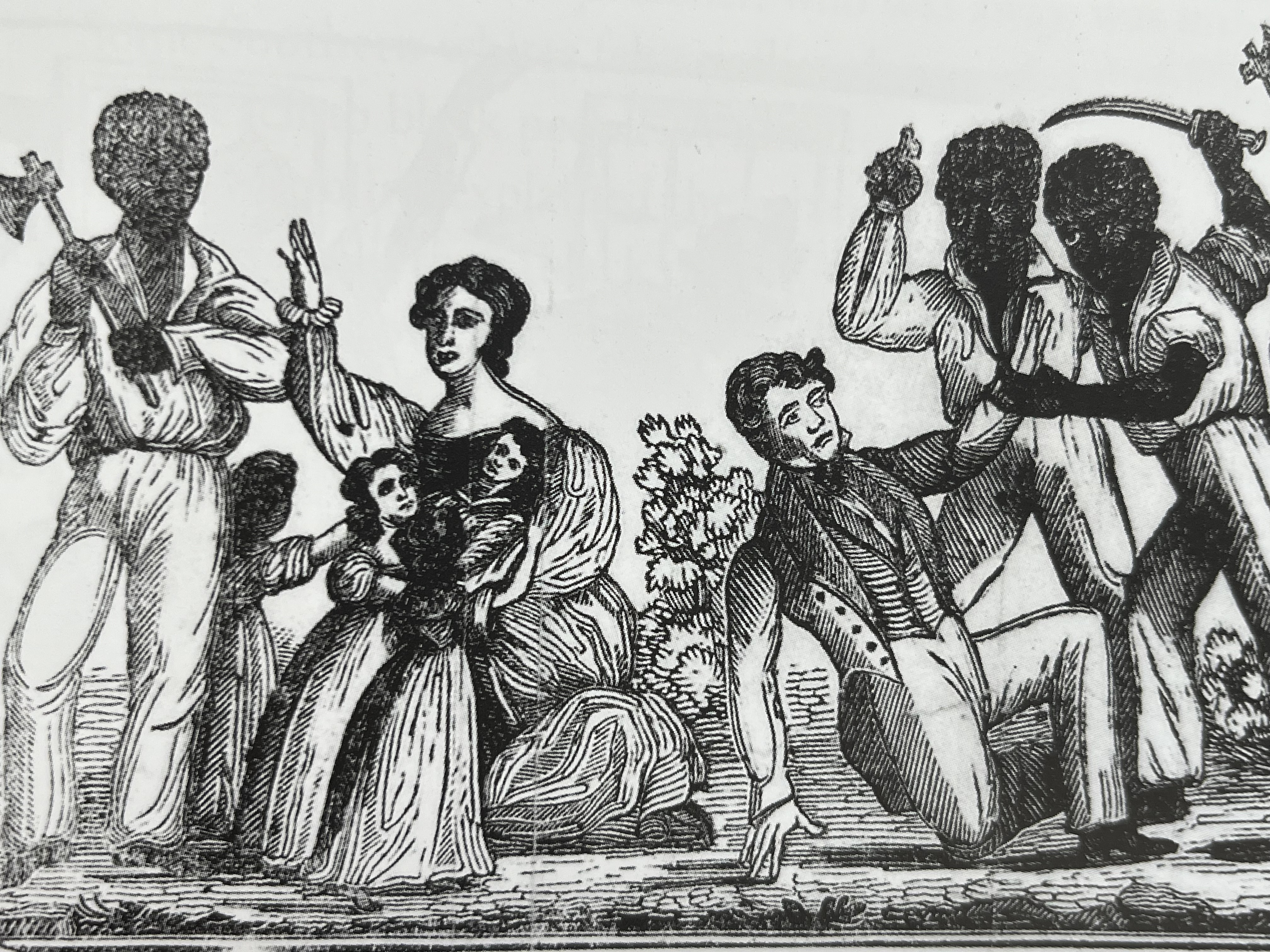
An illustration of the rebellion from an anti-Turner pamphlet by Samuel Warner, 1831

Over approximately a decade, Turner built up support for his cause, culminating in a four-day rebellion started on August 21, 1831.

Nat Turner's Rebellion resulted in the death of 55 White men, women, and children. This is considered the "most deadly slave revolt" in United States history. Turner would later claim to have only personally killed one individual, Margaret Whitehead, whom he bashed with a fencepost. The state militia and local troops quickly suppressed the uprising; between 36 and 120 Black men, women, and children, many of whom were not involved in the revolt, were killed by soldiers and local mobs in retaliation.

Turner eluded capture but remained in Southampton County, in hiding. Slaves from a nearby house provided him with food. On October 30, a farmer named Benjamin Phipps discovered Turner hiding in a depression in the earth, created by a large, fallen tree covered with fence rails. This was referred to locally as Nat Turner's cave, although it was not a natural cave. Around 1 p.m. on October 31, Turner arrived at the prison in the county seat of Jerusalem, Virginia (now Courtland). According to Thomas Wentworth Higginson, writing in 1861, Turner was found "emaciated, ragged, a mere scarecrow."

== Trial and execution ==
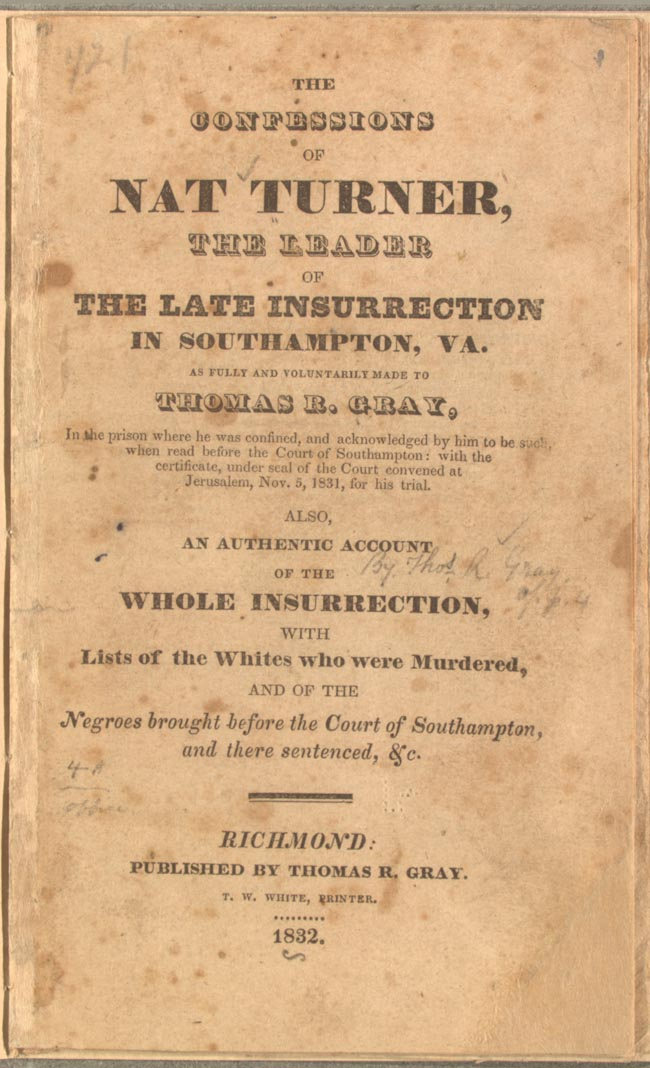
Title page of The Confessions of Nat Turner , published by Thomas R. Gray

Turner was tried on November 5, 1831, for "conspiring to rebel and making insurrection". He pled not guilty; however, his lawyer made no arguments to defend Turner and called no witnesses. Turner was convicted and sentenced to death. His attorney was James Strange French, and James Trezvant served on the jury for Turner's trial. Before his execution, Turner told his story to attorney and slavery apologist Thomas R. Gray, who published The Confessions of Nat Turner in November 1831. When Gray asked him if he had been mistaken, after hearing Turner's account of the Spirit's telling him that "the time was fast approaching when the first should be last, and the last should be first," Turner responded, "Was not Christ crucified?"

An "immense throng" had gathered to watch Turner's execution, on the gallows the executioner told Turner he could give a final speech if he desired, Turner declined and his last words were telling the executioner "I'm ready". Turner was hanged on Friday, November 11, 1831, in Jerusalem. Historian Adam Thomas found an alternative account of Turner's death within the Black community: Percy Claud stated that his mother, Elizabeth, said Turner was “dragged and whipped to death” through multiple towns. Thomas notes this memory originated with Black Virginians and was built from generational memory and trauma, with Turner’s execution being recalled as a lynching, similar to the treatment of the Black community during that time.

What occurred to Turner's corpse after his execution has conflicting accounts. A contemporary newspaper says that Turner's body was sold for dissected, an eyewitness later wrote that Turner was beheaded and his headless body buried, in 1920 the historian William Drewry wrote that Turner's body was beheaded, dissected and flayed, with his skin being used to make souvenir purses. In October 1897, Virginia newspapers ran a story about Nat Turner's skeleton being used as a medical specimen by Dr. H. U. Stephenson of Toana, Virginia. Stephenson acquired the skeleton from a son of Dr. S. B. Kellar; Dr. Kellar claimed to have paid Turner $10 for his body while he was in jail. After the execution, Kellar had Turner's bones scraped and hung as a medical specimen.

In 2002, a skull said to have been Turner's was given to Richard G. Hatcher, the former mayor of Gary, Indiana, for the collection of a civil rights museum he planned to build there. The skull had previously belonged to a family that came into possession of it around the year 1900. In 2016, Hatcher returned the skull to two of Turner's descendants. Since receiving the skull, the family has temporarily placed it with the Smithsonian Institution, where DNA testing will be done to determine whether it is the authentic remains of Nat Turner. If the test renders positive results, the family plans to bury his remains next to his descendants. As of 2021, testing is ongoing and led by anthropologist Douglas W. Owsley with no estimated date of completion; the age, sex, and race of the skull have also not yet been identified.

Another skull said to have been Turner's was donated to the College of Wooster in Ohio in 1866. When the school's only academic building burned down in 1901, the skull was saved by Dr. H. N. Mateer. Visitors to the college recalled seeing a certificate, signed by a physician in Southampton County in 1866, that attested to the authenticity of the skull. The skull was eventually misplaced.

In 1920, The Journal of Negro History reported on a skull, said to be Turner's, that was in the private possession of a physician in Norfolk, Virginia.

== Marriage and children ==
Turner married a slave woman named Cherry, also spelled Chary. (Note: However, historians still dispute exactly who Nat Turner's wife was.) It is thought that Turner and Cherry met and were married at Samuel Turner's plantation in the early 1820s. The couple had children; historians vary in believing that there were one, two, or three children (a daughter and possibly one or two sons, including one named Riddick).

The family was separated after Samuel Turner died in 1823, when Turner was sold to Thomas Moore and his family was sold to Giles Reese. By 1831, his son was enslaved by Piety Reese and lived on a farm that was near the Travis farm where Turner was a slave. However, in February 1831, Reese's son John used Turner's son as collateral for a family debt. One historian notes that Turner approached his conspirators for the rebellion days after his son was used as collateral.

After the rebellion, the authorities beat and tortured Cherry Turner in hopes of finding her husband. On September 26, 1831, the Richmond Constitutional Whig published a story about the raiding of Reese plantation, stating that "some papers [were] given up by his wife, under the lash."

== Legacy ==
- In 1934, Malvin Gary Johnson created the mural "Nat Turner" at the Schomburg Center for Research in Black Culture in New York City as part of the Public Works of Art Project.
- In 2002, scholar Molefi Kete Asante listed Nat Turner as one of the 100 Greatest African Americans.
- In 2009, in Newark, New Jersey, the largest city-owned park was named Nat Turner Park. The facility cost $12 million to construct.
- In 2012, the small Bible that belonged to Turner was donated to the National Museum of African American History and Culture by the Person family of Southampton County, Virginia.
- In 2017, it was announced that Turner was to be honored with others with an Emancipation and Freedom Monument in Richmond, Virginia. Created by Thomas Jay Warren, the state-funded bronze sculpture was dedicated in September 2021.
- In 2022, Christopher Myers created a 32-foot-long tapestry called “The Grim Work of Death", depicting scenes of the rebellion and Turner's visions mixed together, in 2024 it was displayed in the National Museum of African American History and Culture.

== In popular culture ==
=== Film ===
- In January 1968, 20th Century Fox paid $600,000 ($5,412,632 in 2024 money) for the rights to turn William Styron's novel, The Confessions of Nat Turner, into a film. At the time, this was the most ever paid for the film rights of a novel. The film was supposed to star James Earl Jones, but the project was protested by African Americans. The studio and protestors negotiated changes, including using more historical sources, agreeing to not depict black slaves as "lusting after white women", and depicting “a positive image of Turner as a black revolutionary.” However, the film was never made.
- In 2003, Charles Burnett released the documentary Nat Turner: A Troublesome Property.
- The Birth of a Nation, the 2016 film written and directed by Nate Parker, is based on the story of Nat Turner.

=== Literature ===
- In 1884, The Cleveland Gazette published the poem "Nat Turner" by Timothy Thomas Fortune.
- Sterling Allen Brown, the first Poet Laureate of the District of Columbia, wrote the poem, "Remembering Nat Turner" in 1932.
- Mandingo (1957) mentions Nat Turner once in the novel; the prequel Mistress of Falconhurst has Nat Turner's rebellion as a background event.
- The Confessions of Nat Turner (1967), a novel by William Styron, won the Pulitzer Prize for Fiction in 1968. Styron's work was controversial, with some criticizing the White author for writing about such an important Black figure and calling him racist for portraying Turner as lusting for a White woman.
- In response to Styron's novel, ten Black scholars and authors published a collection of essays, William Styron's The Confessions of Nat Turner: Ten Black Writers Respond (1968).
- In 2006, Kyle Baker's graphic novel, Nat Turner, received the Eisner Award for Best Reality-Based Work and the Glyph Comic Award for Best Story of the Year.
- Sharon Ewell Foster published her novel, The Resurrection of Nat Turner, Part One, The Witness, A Novel in 2011.

=== Music ===
- The 1960s funk-soul band Nat Turner Rebellion was named after Turner's slave revolt.
- In the early 1990s, hip-hop artist Tupac Shakur spoke in interviews about Nat Turner and his admiration for his spirit against oppression. Shakur also honored Turner with a cross tattoo on his back, "EXODUS 1831", referring to the year Turner led the rebellion.
- Chance The Rapper's 2016 song "How Great" refers to Turner's rebellion in the line, "Hosanna Santa invoked and woke up enslaved people from Southampton to Chatham Manor."
- Tyler, the Creator's opener "Foreword" on his 2017 album Flower Boy contains the line, "How many slaves can it be 'til Nat Turner arrives?"
- Talib Kweli released the song "Nat Turner" in 2023, on the album Liberation 2, a collaboration with producer Madlib.
- Rap legend Ice Cube features the lyric "with the burner, Nat Turner will make you a quick learner" on his track "All Work No Play", from his 2025 album Man Up.

=== Theater ===
- African American theater educator Randolph Edmonds included Nat Turner: A Play in One Act in his Six Plays for the Negro Theatre, published in 1934 for schools and colleges.
- In 1940, Paul Peter's play, Nat Turner, was produced by the People's Drama Theater in New York City.
- In 2011, Following Faith: A Nat Turner Story, a play by Paula Neiman, was produced in Los Angeles.
- In 2016, the play Nat Turner in Jerusalem, by Nathan Alan Davis was produced at the New York Theatre Workshop, and in 2018 at the Forum Theatre in Washington, D.C.
- In 2021, the Conejo Players Theatre streamed a live production of Nat's Last Struggle by playwright P. A. Wray. The play was also performed virtually by the Virginia Stage Company in August 2020.

== See also ==
- List of slaves
- Slavery in the United States
- Slave rebellion and resistance in the United States
- Slave rebellion
