= John Y. Mason =

American politician and judge (1799–1859)

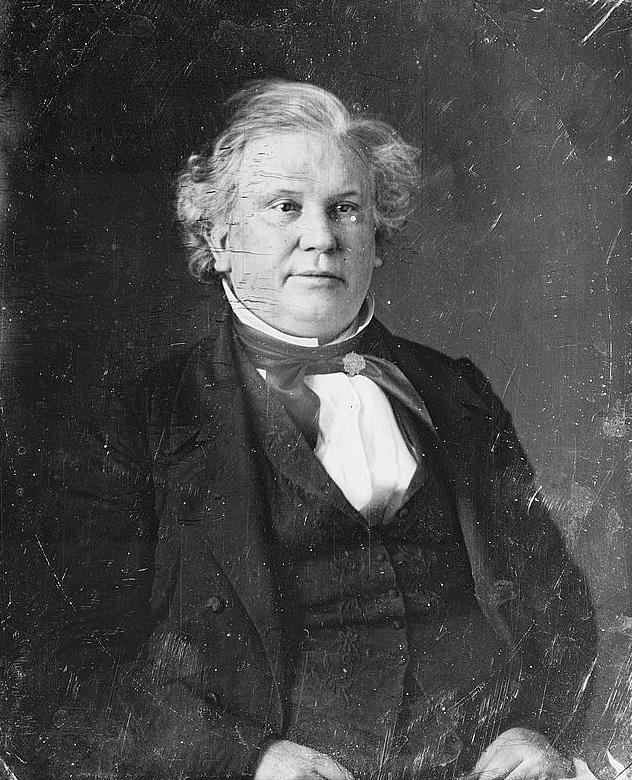
- Mason, 1844–1859

19th United States Minister to France
- In office January 22, 1854 – October 3, 1859
- President: Franklin Pierce; James Buchanan
- Preceded by: William Cabell Rives
- Succeeded by: Charles J. Faulkner

16th and 18th United States Secretary of the Navy
- In office September 10, 1846 – March 4, 1849
- President: James K. Polk
- Preceded by: George Bancroft
- Succeeded by: William Ballard Preston
- In office March 26, 1844 – March 4, 1845
- President: John Tyler
- Preceded by: Thomas Walker Gilmer
- Succeeded by: George Bancroft

18th United States Attorney General
- In office March 5, 1845 – October 16, 1846
- President: James K. Polk
- Preceded by: John Nelson
- Succeeded by: Nathan Clifford

Judge of the United States District Court for the Eastern District of Virginia
- In office March 3, 1841 – March 23, 1844
- Appointed by: Martin Van Buren
- Preceded by: Peter Vivian Daniel
- Succeeded by: James Dandridge Halyburton

Member of the U.S. House of Representatives from Virginia's 2nd district
- In office March 4, 1831 – January 11, 1837
- Preceded by: James Trezvant
- Succeeded by: Francis E. Rives

Member of the Virginia Senate representing Southampton County
- In office 1826–1831
- Preceded by: Edmund Ruffin

Member of the Virginia House of Delegates representing Southampton County
- In office 1823–1826 Serving with Henry Briggs, Carr Bowers
- Preceded by: John C. Gray
- Succeeded by: John Denegre

Member of the Virginia House of Delegates representing Greensville County
- In office 1819–1821

Personal details
- Born: John Young Mason; April 18, 1799 Hicksford, Virginia, U.S.
- Died: October 3, 1859 (aged 60) Paris, French Empire
- Resting place: Hollywood Cemetery; Richmond, Virginia
- Party: Democratic
- Education: University of North Carolina at Chapel Hill (AB); Litchfield Law School

John Young Mason (April 18, 1799 – October 3, 1859) was an attorney, planter, judge, and politician from Virginia. Mason served in the U.S. House of Representatives after serving in both houses of the Virginia General Assembly, then became the United States district judge for the United States District Court for the Eastern District of Virginia (1841-1843), but resigned that position to hold important executive and diplomatic offices in the administrations of Presidents John Tyler, James K. Polk, Franklin Pierce, and James Buchanan, before his death in Paris, France, shortly before the American Civil War, including as the 16th and 18th United States Secretary of the Navy, the 18th Attorney General of the United States, and United States Minister to France.

== Early life and education ==
Mason was born on April 18, 1799, at Homestead plantation, four miles northwest of Hicksford (now Emporia), the county seat of Greensville County, Virginia. His mother was Frances Young, whose father was the deputy clerk of Isle of Wight County during the American Revolutionary War (and family members would serve as that county's clerks for 118 years, including successfully burying those important records during Tarleton's raids during the American Revolutionary War). His father, Edmund Mason (d. 1849), was the second clerk of Greensville County (1807-1834), as well as represented the county in the Virginia House of Delegates (1802-1805, when John was a boy). His grandfather, Col. James Mason, served as a patriot during the American Revolutionary War, but died before this boy's birth. These Southside Masons descended from Francis Mason, an Englishman who migrated to the Virginia colony's Hampton Roads area by the mid-1620s, and another Francis Mason began the family's political prominence by representing Surry County in the House of Burgesses in 1691-1692 (before the creation of Greensville and Southampton Counties), although another prominent Mason family in Virginia would trace its ancestry to George Mason I, who had emigrated to the Northern Neck of Virginia in the 1650s.

After a private education appropriate to his class, including at a neighborhood private school and possibly some home teaching using the family's library, Mason traveled to Chapel Hill, North Carolina, where he befriended James K. Polk (who graduated in 1818 and later became U.S. President). Mason received an artium baccalaureus degree in 1816 from the University of North Carolina at Chapel Hill. He then traveled to Connecticut to study law under the direction of Judge Tapping Reeve at the Litchfield Law School in 1819.

== Career ==
=== Planter and lawyer ===
Mason was admitted to the Virginia bar in 1819 and began a private legal practice, first in Greensville County (1819 to 1821), then neighboring Southampton County, Virginia (1821 to 1831). During part of his terms as legislator representing Southampton County, Mason also served as the local prosecutor (commonwealth's attorney) for Greensville County (from 1827 to 1831). Mason also had other periods of mostly private practice in the late 1830s and late 1840s, as discussed below.

Shortly after his marriage, described below, Mason's parents gave him a 434-acre plantation in Greensville County, and his family and he also sometimes lived on his father's (and grandfather's) former Homestead plantation before Mason sold it back to his parents in 1826. Mason was also one of the founding trustees of the Union Academy of Sussex in 1835. This was because his primary residence after 1823 was Fortsville plantation in western Southampton County (on its border with Sussex County), previously operated by his father-in-law Lewis Fort (who died in 1826). Mason continued to operate these plantations using overseers and enslaved labor. In 1831, Nat Turner's Rebellion occurred in his district, but was suppressed. Mason owned 39 male slaves and 48 female slaves in Southampton County in 1840 (among them one woman over 100 years old and another woman and man older than 55), among the 99 people in his household. A decade later, he owned 84 slaves in Southampton County, and an additional 11 slaves between ages 13 and 40 in Richmond, some of whom may have been leased to other individuals or corporations. A year after his death, Mason's estate continued to own 13 enslaved people in Greensville County, the oldest a 40-year-old woman, and the youngest two six-year-old boys and a three-year-old girl.

=== Virginia state legislator and constitutional convention delegate ===
One local historian of Southampton County considers this Jacksonian Democrat to be the most influential politician in that county for more than a decade. Southampton County voters elected Mason as one of their representatives in the Virginia House of Delegates in 1823 (when both John C. Gray and Francis Williamson died before the session began), and re-elected him twice (so he served alongside first Henry Briggs then Carr Bowers). Thus, Mason served until 1826, when Edmund Ruffin resigned his Virginia Senate seat in order to hold a federal office, and Mason won the election to succeed him in the district consisting of Southampton and Surry Counties, as well as Sussex, Surry, Prince George and Isle of Wight Counties, where he served until succeeded by Francis E. Rives in late 1831. Voters from a district containing the same counties of his state senate district elected Mason as one of their four representatives at the Virginia Constitutional Convention of 1829-1830, and he served alongside James Trezvant, Augustine Claiborne, and John Urquart. That constitution was overwhelmingly adopted by Virginia voters, including 259 of 261 Sussex County voters. Decades later, he represented a similar district (consisting of Greensville and Southampton counties, as well as Isle of Wight, Nansemond, Sussex and Surry Counties) alongside Robert Ridley, John R. Chambliss and A.S.H. Burgess during the Virginia Constitutional Convention of 1850, as well as served as its President after Ridley nominated him and fellow delegates elected him to that speakership. However, he, Ridley and Chambliss would ultimately vote against that instrument, which adopted universal white male voter suffrage, as well as explicitly accepted slaver, but it again was overwhelmingly ratified by Virginia voters as a whole, 75,748 to 11,060.

=== Congressman ===
Mason was elected as a Jacksonian Democrat from Virginia's 2nd congressional district to the United States House of Representatives of the 22nd, 23rd, and 24th United States Congresses and served from March 4, 1831, until resigning on January 11, 1837. He was chairman of the Committee on Foreign Affairs for the 24th United States Congress. Following his departure from Congress, Mason resumed his private legal practice in Greensville's county seat, then known as Hicksford (now Emportia) from 1837 to 1841.

=== Federal judge ===
President Martin Van Buren on February 26, 1841, nominated Mason to a seat on the United States District Court for the Eastern District of Virginia vacated by Judge Peter Vivian Daniel. The United States Senate confirmed the appointment on March 2, 1841, and Mason received his commission on March 3, 1841. On March 23, 1844, Mason having accepted a position as Secretary of the Navy as described below, Mason resigned, thus ending his judicial service.

=== Cabinet minister and diplomat ===
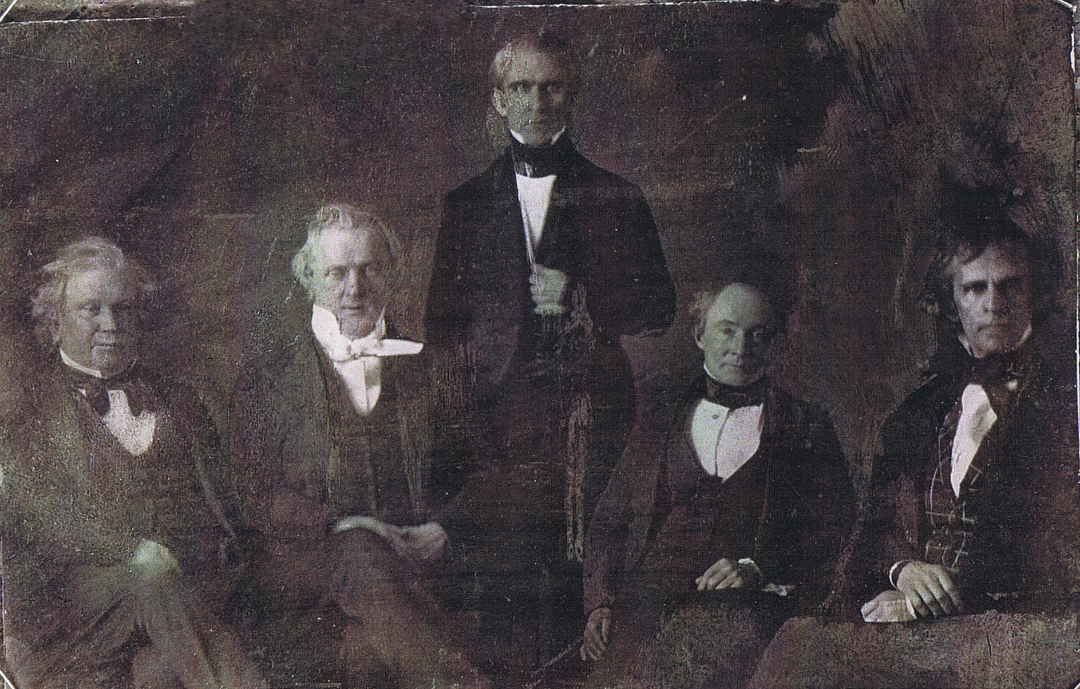
Mason (first from the left) in Polk's cabinet, 1849

President John Tyler appointed Mason the 16th United States Secretary of the Navy in the Cabinet of President John Tyler and served from March 14, 1844, to March 10, 1845, and again as the 18th Secretary in the Cabinet of President James K. Polk from September 9, 1846, to March 7, 1849. He was the 18th Attorney General of the United States from March 11, 1845, to September 9, 1846. He resumed the practice of law in Richmond, Virginia from 1849 to 1854, in addition to his service at the state constitutional convention in 1850. In 1847, the American Philosophical Society elected Mason as one of their members.

In 1853 President Franklin Pierce appointed Mason United States Minister to France for the United States Department of State, and the U.S. Senate confirmed the appointment later that winter. According to John S. Wise in The End of an Era, Mason became associated with Napoleon III. At a meeting in Ostend, Belgium in 1854, Mason met with Buchanan and Soule, the ambassadors to England and Spain, and drafted the Ostend Manifesto which iterated the United States' interest in purchasing Cuba. Its publication aroused outrage in the northern United States, with critics fearing it the beginning of a Caribbean slave empire. Nonetheless, President James Buchanan reappointed Mason, who thus served from January 22, 1854, until his death.

== Personal life ==
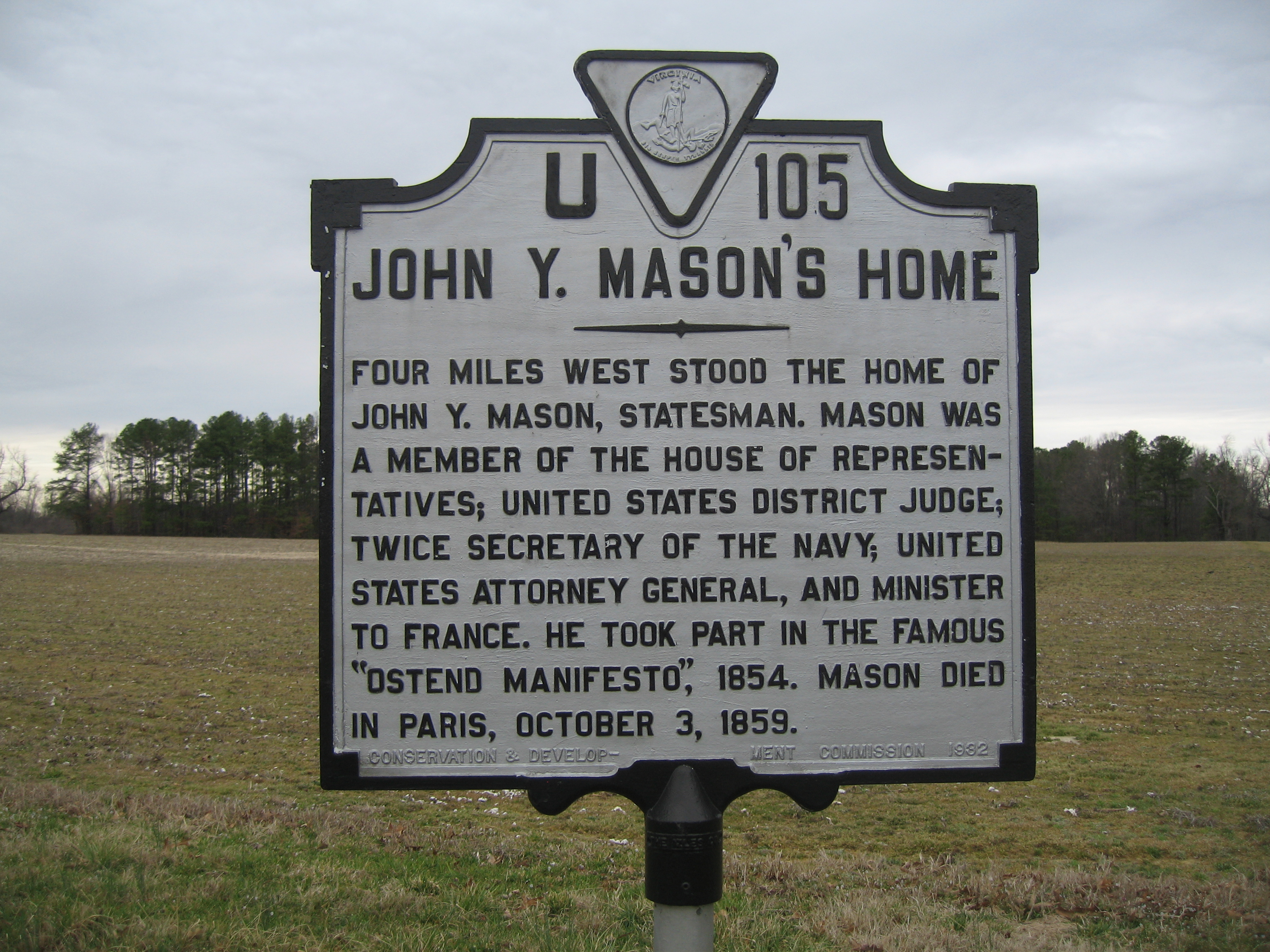
John Y. Mason's Home historical marker

In 1821 Mason married Mary Ann Fort (d. 1870), the daughter of a prominent land-owner but whose family did not have a tradition of political service as extensive as the southside Masons and Youngs. The newlyweds lived at Fortsville, a house her father built in a plantation which straddled three counties. They had twelve children who survived infancy. Five sons and daughters reached adulthood, including Lewis Fort Mason (b. circa 1825), who survived the Civil War and became a schoolteacher in Southampton County. His sister Elizabeth Harris Mason (1830-1881) married Petersburg lawyer Roscoe Briggs Heath, who served as Assistant Adjutant General and Chief of Staff to C.S.A. General Joseph R. Anderson before resigning for health reasons and dying during the Civil War, and her sister married Archer Anderson. John Young Mason Jr. (1823-1862) also died in Virginia during the war and his mother's lifetime. St. George Tucker Mason (1844-1844) enlisted in the 12th Virginia Infantry without his mother's permission and later in the 13th Virginia Cavalry, and was wounded several times but survived the war, then was pardoned and graduated from the Virginia Military Institute (VMI), but returned to Europe and renounced his U.S. citizenship for that of France and enlisted in the French Foreign Legion and served in Algeria before dying of dysentery in what later became Saigon, Vietnam. Simon Blount Mason (1848-1925) graduated from VMI after the Civil War and became a merchant and railroad executive in Hanover County, Virginia.

== Death and legacy ==
Mason died on October 3, 1859, in Paris in the French Empire, survived by his widow and several children. His remains were conveyed to the United States and interred in Hollywood Cemetery in Richmond. His Fortsville plantation, located near Grizzard, Sussex County, Virginia was placed on the National Register of Historic Places in 1970.

USS Mason (DD-191) from 1920 to 1940, and USS Mason (DDG-87) from 2003 to present, were named in honor of Secretary of the Navy John Y. Mason, sharing the honor on DDG-87 with another individual of the same last name.

=== Electoral history ===
- 1831; Mason was elected with 57.88% of the vote, defeating Independent Richard Eppes.
- 1833; Mason was re-elected unopposed.

== See also ==
- Virginia Constitutional Convention of 1850

U.S. House of Representatives
Preceded by James Trezvant	Member of the U.S. House of Representatives from Virginia's 2nd congressional district 1831–1837	Succeeded by Francis E. Rives
Legal offices
Preceded by Peter Vivian Daniel	Judge of the United States District Court for the Eastern District of Virginia; 1841–1844	Succeeded by James Dandridge Halyburton
Government offices
Preceded by Thomas Walker Gilmer	16th United States Secretary of the Navy; 1844–1845	Succeeded by George Bancroft
Preceded by George Bancroft	18th United States Secretary of the Navy; 1846–1849	Succeeded by William Ballard Preston
Legal offices
Preceded by John Nelson	U.S. Attorney General; Served under: James K. Polk; 1845–1846	Succeeded by Nathan Clifford
Diplomatic posts
Preceded by William Cabell Rives	United States Minister to France; 1853–1859	Succeeded by Charles J. Faulkner
