= The Birth of a Nation (2016 film) =

American film by Nate Parker

- Theatrical release poster
- Directed by: Nate Parker
- Screenplay by: Nate Parker
- Story by: Nate Parker; Jean McGianni Celestin
- Produced by: Nate Parker; Kevin Turen; Jason Michael Berman; Aaron L. Gilbert; Preston Holmes
- Starring: Nate Parker; Armie Hammer; Mark Boone Jr.; Colman Domingo; Aunjanue Ellis; Dwight Henry; Aja Naomi King; Esther Scott; Roger Guenveur Smith; Gabrielle Union; Penelope Ann Miller; Jackie Earle Haley
- Cinematography: Elliot Davis
- Edited by: Steven Rosenblum
- Music by: Henry Jackman
- Production companies: BRON Studios; Phantom Four; Mandalay Pictures; Tiny Giant Entertainment
- Distributed by: Fox Searchlight Pictures
- Release dates: January 25, 2016 (Sundance); October 7, 2016 (United States)
- Running time: 120 minutes
- Countries: United States; Canada
- Language: English
- Budget: $8.5 million
- Box office: $16.8 million

The Birth of a Nation is a 2016 historical drama film written and directed by Nate Parker in his directorial debut. It is based on the story of Nat Turner, the enslaved man who led a slave rebellion in Southampton County, Virginia, in 1831. The film stars Parker as Turner, with Armie Hammer, Mark Boone Jr., Colman Domingo, Aunjanue Ellis, Dwight Henry, Aja Naomi King, Esther Scott, Roger Guenveur Smith, Gabrielle Union, Penelope Ann Miller, and Jackie Earle Haley in supporting roles. The film's title is a reference to the 1915 D. W. Griffith film The Birth of a Nation.

The Birth of a Nation had an $8.5 million budget, and filming began in May 2015 in Georgia. The film premiered in competition at the 2016 Sundance Film Festival, where Fox Searchlight Pictures bought worldwide rights in a $17.5 million deal. The film won the Audience Award and Grand Jury Prize in the U.S. Dramatic Competition. The film was theatrically released in the United States on October 7, 2016, and grossed $16 million, receiving positive reviews from critics, with praise for its directing, acting, soundtrack, and cinematography.

During the film's festival run, there was significant press coverage of a 1999 alleged rape that Parker and co-story writer Jean McGianni Celestin were accused of having committed, and the fact that the accuser committed suicide in 2012. While Parker was acquitted and Celestin was not retried after his conviction was overturned on appeal, the controversy surrounding the alleged rape and Parker's initial responses to the controversy cast a shadow over the film.

== Plot ==
In 1809, on a plantation in Southampton County, Virginia, Nat Turner is a young slave boy. Due to limited food for their children, Nat's father, Isaac, ventures out one night to steal something for his son to eat. However, he is apprehended by a posse led by slave-catcher Raymond Cobb. When Cobb attempts to execute Isaac, he turns the tables, killing one member of the posse, and escapes. Upon returning home, Isaac informs his family of the incident and the need for his immediate departure. Before leaving, he shares a final conversation with Nat, emphasizing that he is "a child of God" with a purpose. When Cobb arrives and interrogates Isaac's family about his whereabouts, they remain silent. Benjamin Turner, the owner of the farm, intervenes and drives Cobb away before he turns violent.

Elizabeth Turner, Benjamin's wife, discovers Nat's basic reading skills and begins teaching him, primarily using the Bible. She even arranges for Nat to read Scripture during church gatherings. However, shortly before Benjamin's presumed death from tuberculosis, he instructs his wife to cease Nat's education and assign him to work as a farmhand. As an adult, Nat continues to toil in the cotton fields while also preaching and reading Scripture for his fellow slaves. Samuel Turner, Benjamin's son, inherits ownership of the plantation.

During a slave auction, Nat becomes enamored of Cherry, a female slave up for sale. He persuades Samuel to purchase her as a wedding gift for Samuel's sister, Catherine Turner. Nat and Cherry fall in love, marry, and have a daughter. Due to the deteriorating economic conditions in the South and the poor crop prices, many slave owners struggle to feed their slaves and fear potential revolts. Reverend Walthall proposes an arrangement to Samuel: if Samuel travels with Nat to various plantations, where Nat can preach to the slaves, they will receive substantial compensation from other plantation owners. The intention is to pacify the slaves and convince them that the Bible justifies their endurance of their circumstances. Samuel, in need of money, reluctantly agrees.

During their visits to different plantations, Nat and Samuel witness emaciated and desperate slaves, as well as instances of appalling mistreatment by their owners. After baptizing a white convict (released from prison but banned from white churches due to his pedophilia), Nat is severely beaten, and Samuel terminates Nat's itinerant preaching. Following the death of his grandmother, Nat resolves to rebel against the slaveholders. He holds a clandestine meeting with a select group of trusted fellow slaves, including a fellow slave whose wife was raped by one of Samuel's guests, a boy from another plantation, and others, and prepares them for the uprising. Nat also confides in Cherry, who is still recovering from a severe beating, seeking her approval for the planned revolt.

Under cover of darkness, Nat and a fellow slave enter their owners' house and kill Samuel and the manager (rescuing a young black slave girl from his bed). They then rally the other slaves on the plantation, and most of them join their cause. Throughout the night, they seize control of several other plantations, killing the slave owners. During one takeover, they realize that the boy has gone missing. Shortly afterward, they are ambushed by a group of white men, alerted by the boy, and are forced to retreat. The next morning, they march into the town of Jerusalem to procure weapons. They encounter another group of white men, led by Cobb once again, but manage to overcome them, with Nat personally killing Cobb. However, their hopes are shattered upon discovering an empty arsenal. They are swiftly attacked by soldiers, resulting in the death of every slave except Nat, who escapes.

In a secret meeting with Cherry, Nat learns of the retaliatory murder of innocent slaves and the potential for more bloodshed as long as he remains on the run. Consequently, Nat decides to surrender himself and is condemned to death. During his hanging, Nat notices the slave boy who betrayed their group in the crowd, but he harbors no ill will towards him. The film concludes with a fade from the boy's tearful face to the face of an adult soldier, presumably the same boy now grown up and fighting for the Union Army during the American Civil War.

== Cast ==
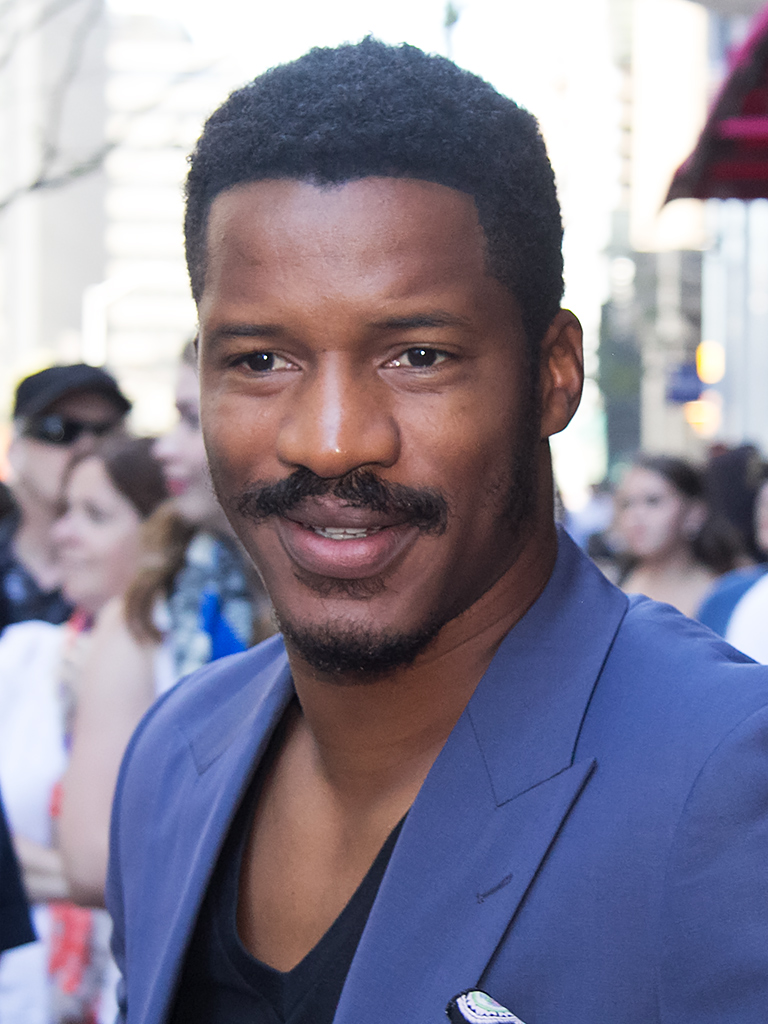
Nat Turner is played by Nate Parker, who also wrote, produced, and directed the film.

- Nate Parker as Nat Turner
  - Tony Espinosa as Young Nat Turner
- Armie Hammer as Samuel Turner
- Mark Boone Junior as Rev. Walthall
- Colman Domingo as Hark Turner
- Aunjanue Ellis as Nancy Turner
- Dwight Henry as Isaac Turner
- Aja Naomi King as Cherry Turner
- Esther Scott as Bridget Turner
- Roger Guenveur Smith as Isaiah
- Gabrielle Union as Esther
- Penelope Ann Miller as Elizabeth Turner
- Jackie Earle Haley as Raymond Cobb
- Jayson Warner Smith as Hank Fowler
- Jason Stuart as Joseph Randall
- Steve Coulter as General Childs
- Kelvin Harrison Jr. as Simon

== Title ==
The 2016 film uses the same title as "D. W. Griffith's 1915 KKK propaganda film in a very purposeful way", said The Hollywood Reporter. Parker has said his film had the same title "ironically, but very much by design". He told the magazine Filmmaker:

Griffith's film relied heavily on racist propaganda to evoke fear and desperation as a tool to solidify white supremacy as the lifeblood of American sustenance. Not only did this film motivate the massive resurgence of the terror group the Ku Klux Klan and the carnage exacted against people of African descent, it served as the foundation of the film industry we know today. I've reclaimed this title and re-purposed it as a tool to challenge racism and white supremacy in America, to inspire a riotous disposition toward any and all injustice in this country (and abroad) and to promote the kind of honest confrontation that will galvanize our society toward healing and sustained systemic change.

== Production ==
I kind of sold this project to investors and cast on legacy. I honestly think this is a film that could start a conversation that can promote healing and systemic change in our country. There's so many things that are happening right now in 2015—100 years after the original Birth of a Nation film, here we are. I'd say that is what I hope sets my film apart, is that it's relevant now—that people will talk about this film with the specific intention of change.

— Nate Parker, 2015

The Birth of a Nation was written, produced, and directed by Nate Parker, who also stars as Nat Turner. Parker wrote the screenplay, which was based on a story he co-wrote with Jean McGianni Celestin. Parker learned about Turner from an African-American studies course at the University of Oklahoma. He began writing the screenplay for a Nat Turner film in 2009 and had a fellowship at a lab under the Sundance Institute. While he got writing feedback from filmmakers like James Mangold, he was told that a Nat Turner film could not be produced. The Hollywood Reporter said:

But what he heard instead were all the reasons a movie about Nat Turner wouldn't work: Movies with black leads don't play internationally; a period film with big fight scenes would be too expensive; it was too violent; it wouldn't work without a big box-office star leading it; Turner was too controversial—after all, he was responsible for the deaths of dozens of well-off white landowners.

After Parker finished his acting role in Beyond the Lights in late 2013, he told his agents he would not continue acting until he had played Nat Turner in a film. He invested $100,000 of his money to hire a production designer and to pay for location scouting in Savannah, Georgia. He met with multiple financiers, and the first to invest in the film were retired basketball player Michael Finley (who had previously invested in the 2013 film The Butler) and then, active basketball player Tony Parker (no relation). Parker eventually brought together eleven groups of investors to finance 60% of the production budget, and producer Aaron L. Gilbert of BRON Studios joined to cover the remaining financing. It was made in association with TSG Entertainment.

In November 2014, development was underway, and Armie Hammer joined the cast. By April 2015, Aja Naomi King and Gabrielle Union joined the cast. In subsequent months, Penelope Ann Miller, Jackie Earle Haley, and Mark Boone Junior also joined. Filming took place in Georgia (including at Myrtle Grove Plantation) in May 2015 and lasted 27 days. Parker used the a cappella choir from Wiley College on the soundtrack. Parker had previously been part of a cast that portrayed historical figures from Wiley, in The Great Debaters (2007).

== Release ==
The Birth of a Nation premiered in competition at the 2016 Sundance Film Festival on January 25, 2016. Before it screened, the audience gave a standing ovation to the introduction of Nate Parker. Afterwards, Variety said it "received the most enthusiastic standing ovation at this year's Sundance Film Festival so far".

Shortly after, a major bidding battle for distribution rights began; WME's Graham Taylor had set a minimum bidding price of $12 million, thereby eliminating multiple interested buyers. Among the remaining bidders were Sony Pictures Entertainment (under the Sony Pictures Classics label), the Weinstein Company, Netflix, and Fox Searchlight Pictures; Lionsgate and Paramount Pictures expressed much interest, but ultimately never submitted bids for the film. Parker seemed to prefer either Fox Searchlight or TWC, both companies having released films in the past that had a predominantly Black casts and subject matter: Fox Searchlight released 12 Years a Slave, which won the Academy Award for Best Picture, and TWC released The Butler among others. Fox Searchlight made their official pitch at 11:00 p.m. that night, with TWC's Harvey Weinstein and David Glasser following suit post midnight. Weinstein was willing to go as high as $14 million, but dropped out by 5:00 a.m. the next day when bids reached $15 million; Fox Searchlight then increased this to $17.5 million. Netflix reportedly offered a $20 million bid, but insisted on having a day-and-date release for the film much like 2015's Beasts of No Nation, released in conjunction with Bleecker Street. This offer effectively dissuaded Parker and the film's producers from moving forward with it as they preferred a large theatrical experience instead. Parker later stated that the main reason he chose Fox Searchlight was that its executives were open to hear his ideas, especially the idea that The Birth of a Nation should be screened in educational institutions nationwide. Parker then informed Taylor of this decision, who finalized the deal with Fox Searchlight around dawn. Variety said Fox Searchlight's deal was "the richest in Sundance history"; The Hollywood Reporter noted that the deal was not only "the biggest deal in the festival's history", but also "the largest sum ever paid for a finished film at any festival".

A teaser trailer for the film was released in April 2016, followed by an official trailer on June 21, 2016. On July 6, the UK release date of January 20, 2017, was announced. It was actually released in the UK on December 9, 2016. A film poster with Parker in a noose made from an American flag was released on July 15.

20th Century Fox canceled the planned 2017 release of the film in Japan, Switzerland, Norway, Finland, Denmark, Austria, and Latin America following the disappointing results at the U.S. box office, which damaged the overall distribution budget for the film.

=== Home media ===
The film was released on Digital HD on December 20, 2016, and on Ultra HD Blu-ray, Blu-ray and DVD on January 10, 2017.

=== Rape allegations against Parker ===
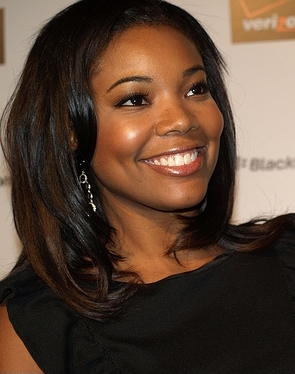
Gabrielle Union co-starred in the film and is a rape survivor herself.

In August 2016, media attention surrounding the film resurfaced 1999 alleged rape charges against Nate Parker and co-writer Jean McGianni Celestin. While students at Pennsylvania State University, Parker and Celestin were accused of raping a female student. The woman went to a doctor, who concluded that she had been sexually assaulted, and local authorities taped a phone conversation between her and Parker in which Parker confirmed that it was he and Celestin who had sex with her. Parker and Celestin denied the accusations and said that the sexual encounter was consensual. Parker was acquitted of all charges in 2001; Celestin was convicted of sexual assault, but the conviction was overturned on appeal in 2005. A subsequent retrial did not take place.

In a formal complaint filed against Penn State in 2002, the woman also stated that she was harassed by Parker and Celestin following her allegation; the harassment allegedly "included Parker and Celestin hiring a private investigator to publicly expose her as the accuser, and continued bullying by Parker and his friends outside buildings where she had class". The university settled the complaint with the woman for $17,500 (~$31,325 in 2025). The woman committed suicide in 2012, with her death certificate noting that she suffered from "major depressive disorder with psychotic features, PTSD due to physical and sexual abuse, polysubstance abuse".

Because The Birth of a Nation attracted increased scrutiny due to possible Oscar nominations, and the film itself depicts a fictional, brutal rape that does not appear in historical records, there was significant press coverage about damage control by Fox Searchlight Pictures, the studio releasing the film. Interviews in Variety and Deadline were a focus, as was Parker's response to the event in an impassioned Facebook post. The studio reportedly took a wait-and-see approach before marketing to church groups, college campuses, and Hollywood figures.

Writing in Variety, the sister of Parker's alleged victim expressed particular distress at the film's imagined rape scene, saying, "I find it creepy and perverse that Parker and Celestin would put a fictional rape at the center of their film, and that Parker would portray himself as a hero avenging that rape. Given what happened to my sister, and how no one was held accountable for it, I find this invention self-serving and sinister, and I take it as a cruel insult to my sister's memory."

Gabrielle Union, a rape survivor and one of the main stars in The Birth of a Nation, wrote in the Los Angeles Times to express her concern over the allegations, particularly the lack of affirmative consent: "Even if she never said 'no', silence certainly does not equal 'yes'. Although it's often difficult to read and understand body language, the fact that some individuals interpret the absence of a 'no' as a 'yes' is problematic at least, criminal at worst."

After having suffered significant negative publicity for his response to the past rape allegation, Parker chose to deflect the questions about his past legal problems while doing press for The Birth of a Nation at the Toronto International Film Festival. Shortly thereafter, Parker and his handlers chose to cut press interviews short when similar questions came up about his involvement with the alleged rape and its impact on the marketing of the film.

In an open letter, former members of the Penn State student body and staff who were present during Celestin and Parker's trial defended both men's innocence of the 1999 accusations. The group made allegations of police intimidation and a hostile racial climate on campus at the time; both Parker and Celestin are black while their accuser was a white female. The group wrote in The Root:

Misinformation suggests that a spiral into depression was triggered by the alleged incident in 1999. However, court records and testimony by medical professionals revealed a history of chronic depression that dated back to childhood and the use of antidepressant medication that preceded this event.

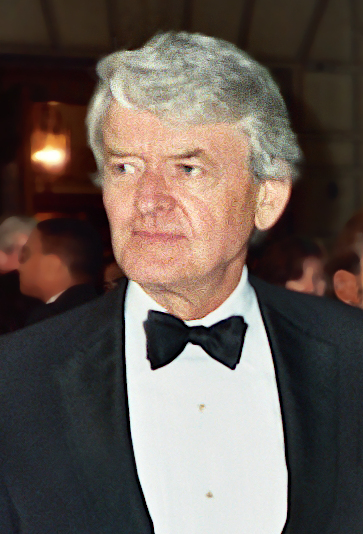
Actor Hal Holbrook wrote a letter to The New York Times praising the film and defending Parker.

Celebrities who came out in support of Parker included Harry Belafonte, Hal Holbrook, Mel Gibson, Kevin Hart, Harvey Weinstein (who was later embroiled in a sexual assault scandal), Al Sharpton, Anthony Anderson, and Sheryl Underwood. Holbrook wrote a letter to The New York Times defending Parker and the film. Holbrook praised The Birth of a Nation as "an exceptional piece of artistry and a vital portrait of our American experience in trying to live up to ideals we say we have" and suggested that owing to the film's critique of racism, Parker and his film were being held to a different standard than what Holbrook characterized as other "directors and actors who have rather public indiscretions, and who have in some cases been acquitted of them".

== Reception ==
=== Box office ===
In the United States and Canada, The Birth of a Nation was projected to gross around $10 million in its opening weekend. It opened to $7.1 million, finishing sixth at the box office. African-Americans made up 60% of the first weekend audience. In its second weekend the film dropped 61.2%, grossing just $2.7 million and finishing tenth at the box office.

Despite grossing nearly double its budget, the film was considered a financial disappointment. In assessing the mediocre opening weekend of The Birth of a Nation, The Washington Post reported, "While some moviegoers may have been put off by the controversy, middling reviews for the movie itself probably didn’t help. Meanwhile, historic dramas can be a hard sell: It's possible a lot of multiplex visitors just plain weren't interested." Adding to the film's problems, "Several prominent feminists decried Parker's defiant response to the [rape] scandal and pledged to boycott the film, which drew a protest vigil at Hollywood's ArcLight Cinemas."

Gabrielle Union, who appeared in the film, told Essence that she understood why some film-goers were avoiding the film and stated that she, as a rape survivor, could not sell it to anyone who chose to avoid the film due to the controversy. She said, "As a rape survivor and as an advocate, I cannot shy away from this responsibility because the conversation got difficult. I don’t want to put myself above anyone's pain or triggers. Every victim or survivor, I believe you. I support you. I support you if you don't want to see the film. I absolutely understand and respect that. I can't sell the film."

=== Critical response ===
On the review website Rotten Tomatoes, the film has an approval rating of 72% based on 269 reviews, with an average rating of 6.70/10. The site's critical consensus reads, "The Birth of a Nation overpowers its narrative flaws and uneven execution through sheer conviction, rising on Nate Parker's assured direction and the strength of its vital message." Metacritic gave the film a normalized score of 69 out of 100, based on 49 critics, indicating "generally favorable reviews". Audiences polled by CinemaScore gave the film an average grade of "A" on an A+ to F scale.

Justin Chang at Variety compared The Birth of a Nation to 12 Years a Slave, saying: "Parker's more conventionally told but still searingly impressive debut feature pushes the conversation further still: A biographical drama steeped equally in grace and horror, it builds to a brutal finale that will stir deep emotion and inevitable unease." He concluded, "The Birth of a Nation exists to provoke a serious debate about the necessity and limitations of empathy, the morality of retaliatory violence, and the ongoing black struggle for justice and equality in this country. It earns that debate and then some."

The Hollywood Reporter's Todd McCarthy said, "The film vividly captures an assortment of slavery’s brutalities while also underlining the religious underpinnings of Turner's justifications for his assaults on slaveholders." He added, "The film offers up more than enough in terms of intelligence, insight, historical research and religious nuance as to not at all be considered a missed opportunity; far more of the essentials made it into the film than not, its makers' dedication and minute attention are constantly felt and the subject matter is still rare enough onscreen as to be welcome and needed, as it will be the next time and the time after that."

Michael Phillips of the Chicago Tribune was critical of Parker's direction, saying, "one of the drawbacks, ironically, is Parker's own performance. Even the rape victims of the screenplay have a hard time getting their fair share of the screen time; everything in the story, by design, keeps the focus and the anguished close-ups strictly on Parker. He's a good actor, but not much of a director; the visual style and approach of The Birth of a Nation tries a little of everything, and often too much of everything."

In its October 10 issue, The New Yorker ran two reviews, "The Cinematic Merits and Flaws of Nate Parker's The Birth of a Nation", by Richard Brody, and "The Birth of a Nation Isn't Worth Defending", by Vinson Cunningham.

=== Accolades ===
List of awards and nominations
Award	Date of ceremony	Category	Recipient(s)	Result	Ref.
African-American Film Critics Association	February 8, 2017	Top 10 Films	The Birth of a Nation	6th place	
Austin Film Critics Association	December 28, 2016	Best First Film	The Birth of a Nation	Nominated	
BET Awards	June 25, 2017	Best Movie	The Birth of a Nation	Nominated	
BET Awards	June 25, 2017	Best Actress	Gabrielle Union	Nominated	
Black Reel Awards	February 16, 2017	Outstanding Actor	Nate Parker	Nominated	
Black Reel Awards	February 16, 2017	Outstanding Director	Nate Parker	Nominated	
Black Reel Awards	February 16, 2017	Outstanding Screenplay, Adapted or Original	Nate Parker	Nominated	
Black Reel Awards	February 16, 2017	Outstanding Ensemble	The cast of The Birth of a Nation	Nominated	
Black Reel Awards	February 16, 2017	Outstanding Breakthrough Performance, Female	Aja Naomi King	Nominated	
Black Reel Awards	February 16, 2017	Outstanding Original Score	Henry Jackman	Nominated	
Directors Guild of America Awards	February 4, 2017	Outstanding Directing – First-Time Feature Film	Nate Parker	Nominated	
NAACP Image Awards	February 11, 2017	Outstanding Motion Picture	The Birth of a Nation	Nominated	
NAACP Image Awards	February 11, 2017	Outstanding Actor in a Motion Picture	Nate Parker	Nominated	
NAACP Image Awards	February 11, 2017	Outstanding Supporting Actress in a Motion Picture	Aja Naomi King	Nominated	
NAACP Image Awards	February 11, 2017	Outstanding Independent Picture	The Birth of a Nation	Nominated	
NAACP Image Awards	February 11, 2017	Outstanding Directing in a Motion Picture	Nate Parker	Nominated	
NAACP Image Awards	February 11, 2017	Outstanding Writing in a Motion Picture	Nate Parker	Nominated	
Satellite Awards	February 19, 2017	Best Film Editing	Steven Rosenblum	Nominated	
Sundance Film Festival	January 29, 2016	Audience Award: U.S. Dramatic	Nate Parker	Won	
Sundance Film Festival	January 29, 2016	U.S. Grand Jury Prize: Dramatic	Nate Parker	Won	

== See also ==
- The Confessions of Nat Turner, a 1967 Pulitzer Prize-winning novel by William Styron
- A House Divided: Denmark Vesey's Rebellion, a 1982 television film about Denmark Vesey and his attempted slave rebellion
- List of films featuring slavery
- Nat Turner: A Troublesome Property, a 2003 documentary film by Charles Burnett
- Quilombo, a 1984 Brazilian drama film about Palmares, a fugitive community of escaped slaves
- Tula: The Revolt, a 2013 historical drama film about escaped slave Tula and the Curaçao Slave Revolt of 1795
- List of black films of the 2010s
