= Thomas R. Gray =

American attorney and author (1800–1845)

- Born: Thomas Ruffin Gray; 1800; Southampton County, Virginia, U.S.
- Died: August 23, 1845 (aged 44–45); Portsmouth, Virginia, U.S.
- Occupations: Attorney; author; diplomat; planter
- Writing career
- Notable work: The Confessions of Nat Turner (1831)

Thomas Ruffin Gray (1800 – August 23, 1845) was an American attorney, diplomat, author, and slave planter. He represented several slaves during their trials in the wake of Nat Turner's Rebellion in Southampton County, Virginia in 1831. Gray interviewed Nat Turner and published The Confessions of Nat Turner, the first detailed account of the slave rebellion. Later, Gray was the U.S. Consul for Tabasco, Mexico and Trinidad de Cuba, Cuba.

== Biography ==
Thomas Ruffin Gray was born in 1800 in Southampton County, Virginia. He was the youngest of six children of Anne (née Cocke) Brewer Gray and Thomas Gray, a slaveholder, planter, and horse breeder. The Gray family was prominent in Surry County, Virginia, from which Southampton County was formed. Gray was the grandson of Edwin Gray and a great-grandson of Joseph Gray. Gray inherited his first enslaved person, Hertwell, from his maternal grandfather when he was seven years old.

At the age of 21, Gray inherited 400 acres (160 ha) of land at the Round Hill plantation and fourteen enslaved people over age twelve, beginning his tentative career as a planter. Several years later, Gray had constructed a house on the property, increasing its value to about $500. In January 1828, Gray represented Southampton County on the corresponding committee of the Andrew Jackson convention in Richmond, Virginia. Gray became a justice of the peace and served as a magistrate in Southampton County in 1828. In 1829, he bought his recently deceased brother's property and a house on Main Street in the county's seat, Jerusalem, which supplied him with 800 acres (320 ha) of real property. Soon after, he married Mary A. Gray.

In September 1830, Gray received a license to practice law. Later in life, Gray stated that he had studied law in his youth; this may have included an apprenticeship with his cousin in the county clerk's office. The magistrates certified Gray's qualifications as an attorney in October 1830. In December, Gray was admitted to practice in court and resigned as justice of the peace.

As a planter, Gray's status in society began to rise; however, simultaneously, his family's fortunes began to disintegrate. His father and brother fell deeply into debt, and Gray attempted to provide financial assistance to his family, but, in doing so, brought himself into debt along with them. He was hounded by creditors, eventually arrested for his debt, and spent time in a debtors' prison. He was forced to sell his plantation, horses, and the people he enslaved in the 1820s. Thus, Gray did not own slaves at the outbreak of Nat Turner's Rebellion in Southampton County in August 1831.

Gray continued to work as a lawyer in Jerusalem and was one of the leaders in the Southampton County inquiry of the rebellion that was conducted from late August to September 1831, under the leadership of former congressman James Trezvant. Gray researched the rebellion and interviewed several captured enslaved people who took part in the uprising. By mid-September, he had composed a list of forty participants of the rebellion.

Gray was one of five attorneys appointed by the court to defend the enslaved people charged with participating in the rebellion. However, Gray became sick with malaria, which limited the extent of his involvement in the trials. He was the defense attorney for five people, all of whom were convicted. (Note: Some sources state that Gray was the defense attorney for only four people. However, Gray represented two people named Davy, one was a man that was owned by the estate of Elizabeth Turner and the other a young man owned by Nathaniel Francis, along with a man named Sam, a man named Jack owned by William Reese, and the young Moses who was owned by Putnam Moore.) One of the five was a young boy named Moses who was impressed into joining the rebellion; Moses was the only one who received a commutation from execution to being sold out of the state. Yet, historian Patrick H. Breen notes that Gray's efforts at defense were "excellent" and included calling Black and White witnesses.

Gray's father became ill and died while his son was occupied with the trials. To keep his property away from his son's creditors, Gray's father disinherited his son and, instead, directed his estate to discharge a note owed by his son. He also left one-third of his estate to his granddaughter, Ellen Douglas Gray, the only child of Mary and Thomas Ruffin Gray. His father's efforts and publishing The Confessions of Nat Turner appear to have failed in gaining long term financial success for Gray, as Gray was arrested for his debts in 1835 and lost his home and land for the second time.

In August 1836, President Andrew Jackson appointed Gray to fill a vacancy as the U.S. Consul for Tabasco, Mexico; this position was renewed in January 1837. However, according to Anthony E. Kaye and Gregory P. Downs, Gray never took the post. In October 1837, Gray was reassigned as the U.S. Consul for Trinidad de Cuba in Cuba. His work as a consul in Cuba was connected to a scandal, although Gray himself was not faulted. Later, Gray worked as a lawyer in and around Norfolk, Virginia. In November 1841, Gray was one of the attorneys for a superior court case involving the rights of non-citizen to enlist in the United States Army.

Gray died from bilious fever in Portsmouth, Virginia, on August 23, 1845, at the age of 45 years.

== The Confessions of Nat Turner ==
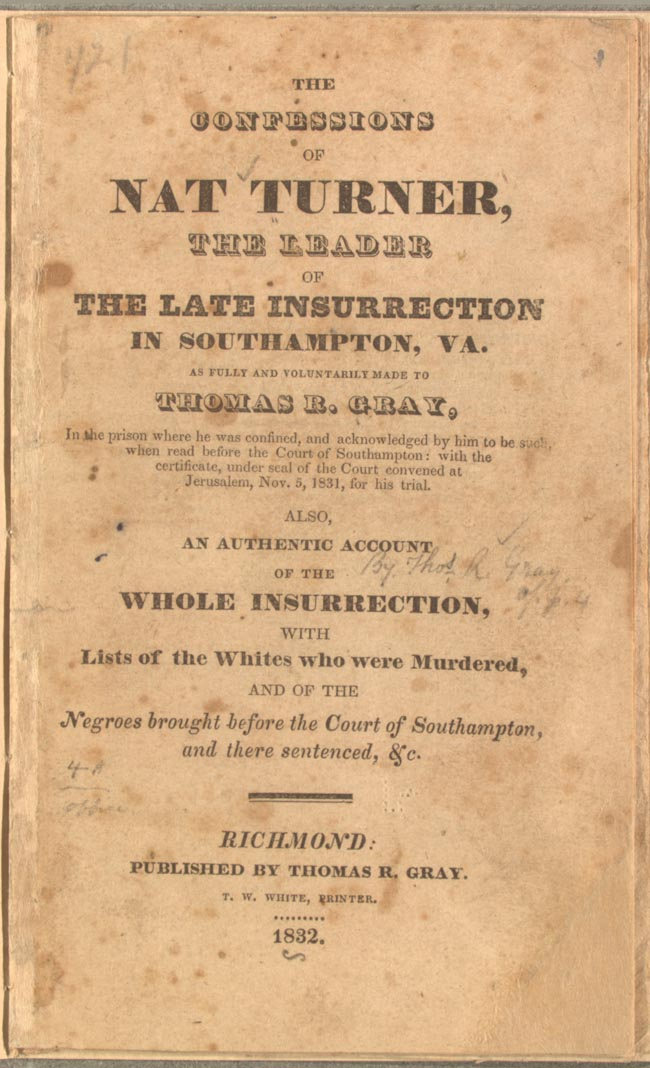
Title page of Gray's The Confessions of Nat Turner

In late October 1831, Gray, that had been part of the militia that organized the first morning of the rebellion, asked Nat Turner to talk with him about the rebellion; Turner agreed on October 31. On November 1, 1831, Gray interviewed Nat Turner in Jerusalem, Virginia. Gray recorded Nat Turner's recollections of his life leading up to the rebellion, and most particularly his experiences with reading and writing, scientific experiments, prophecies, and his spiritual influence on the neighborhood enslaved people. On November 3, Gray returned to the jail and cross-examined Nat Turner. Gray compiled the Nat Turner interviews, which were read into evidence in court during the Turner's trial on November 5, 1831.

Five days later, Gray was in Washington, D.C. where he registered his manuscript, receiving a copyright for The Confessions of Nat Turner on November 10, 1831, the day before Turner's execution. Gray then traveled to Baltimore and hired Lucas and Deaver to print 50,000 copies of his pamphlet. His self-published pamphlet The Confessions of Nat Turner, the Leader of the Late Insurrection in Southampton, VA. was printed on November 22, 1831, and was available in Washington, D.C.; Philadelphia; and Norfolk the next day. Gray's publication was the first detailed account of Nat Turner's Rebellion.

In his pamphlet, Gray describes Turner as "an exceptional figure, distinguished from his followers by his honesty, his commanding intelligence, and his firm belief in the righteousness". Gray attributed the rebellion to "coloured preachers" and white pastors "who fill up their discourses with a ranting cant about equality," and to Turner's religious fanaticism. Thus, Gray calls Turner a "fanatic" whose mind was "warped and perverted", noting "I looked on him and my blood curdled in my veins". Today, in large measure because of statements like this in The Confessions, many historians believe Gray was a slavery apologist.

Newspapers in Virginia published excerpts from Gray's pamphlet. The Richmond Enquirer claimed that it would show Northern abolitionists the negative impact of their influence on the enslaved. In contrast, Northern abolitionist and journalist William Lloyd Garrison thought Gray's publication would inspire Black leaders to organize more insurrections. Garrison's newspaper, The Liberator, also published excepts from The Confessions.

== Legacy ==
The Encyclopedia of Virginia notes that, "The historical Nat Turner... is largely the product of 'The Confessions of Nat Turner'", the pamphlet written and published by Thomas R. Gray. Although the pamphlet is a primary source, some historians and literary scholars have noted biases in Gray's writing, indicating that Gray may not have portrayed Turner's voice as accurately as he claimed to have done. Kenneth S. Greenberg, professor and chair of the History Department at Suffolk University, wrote that Gray's pamphlet is not as reliable as one may think, cautioning readers to analyze the source with great care. Other scholars have analyzed The Confessions and have deemed it to be an overall reliable source. Professor emeritus of history at the University of Delaware, David F. Allmendinger Jr., writes, "Apart from its style, there are proofs elsewhere, in the substance of the narrative...The confession was no fraud. It was and is authentic."

In 1967, William Styron published The Confessions of Nat Turner, a controversial fictionalized account of Nat Turner's Rebellion using the same title as Gray's pamphlet. Styron's Pulitzer Prize-winning novel is written from first-person perspective of Turner. Gray's pamphlet, The Confessions of Nat Turner, was the first publication claiming to present Turner's own words regarding the rebellion and his life.
