= James Johnson (Virginia politician) =

American politician

Member of the U.S. House of Representatives from Virginia's 20th district
- In office March 4, 1813 – February 1, 1820
- Preceded by: Thomas Newton Jr.
- Succeeded by: John C. Gray

Member of the Virginia House of Delegates from Isle of Wight County
- In office 1809–1813
- Preceded by: Charles Wren
- Succeeded by: Robert Tynes Fulgham
- In office 1806–1807
- Preceded by: Richard Willing Byrd; John Hyndman Purdie
- Succeeded by: Robert Eley; Charles Wren
- In office 1797–1804 (Note: Johnson was briefly out of office before he succeeded Thomas Whitfield, who died in 1798.)
- Preceded by: Mills Wills
- Succeeded by: Richard Willing Byrd; John Hyndman Purdie

Personal details
- Born: Virginia
- Died: December 7, 1825 Norfolk, Virginia, U.S.
- Party: Democratic-Republican
- Education: College of William & Mary
- Profession: Politician, lawyer

James Johnson (died December 7, 1825) was a U.S. representative from Virginia. Prior to being a U.S. representative, he was a member of the Virginia House of Delegates from Isle of Wight County, Virginia.

== Biography ==
Born in Virginia, Johnson completed preparatory studies. He graduated from the College of William & Mary, in Williamsburg, Virginia, about 1795. He studied law, and was admitted to the bar and practiced in Williamsburg. He served as member of the Virginia House of Delegates representing Isle of Wight County, Virginia. 1797 to 1804, 1806, 1807, and 1809–1813.

Johnson was elected as a Democratic-Republican to the Thirteenth and to the three succeeding Congresses and served until his resignation on February 1, 1820 (March 4, 1813 – February 1, 1820). He was appointed collector of customs at Norfolk, February 1, 1820 and served until his death on December 7, 1825, in Norfolk, Virginia.

== Notes ==
U.S. House of Representatives
Preceded by Thomas Newton Jr.	Member of the U.S. House of Representatives from Virginia's 20th congressional district 1813–1820	Succeeded by John C. Gray
