= Nat Turner: A Troublesome Property =

- Directed by: Charles Burnett
- Written by: Charles Burnett; Frank Christopher; Kenneth S. Greenberg
- Produced by: Frank Christopher
- Cinematography: John Demps
- Edited by: Michael Colin; Frank Christopher
- Music by: Todd Capps
- Release date: February 16, 2003 (Pan African Film Festival)
- Running time: 57 minutes
- Country: United States
- Language: English

Nat Turner: A Troublesome Property is a 2003 documentary film about Nat Turner co-written and directed by Charles Burnett.

== Plot ==
The documentary interweaves Thomas R. Gray's 1831 The Confessions of Nat Turner, William Styron's 1966 novel of the same name, and additional source material by Harriet Beecher Stowe, William Wells Brown, and Randolph Edmonds.

== Cast ==
Different actors played Nat Turner, depending on the source material.

- Nat Turner
- Carl Lumbly (Gray)
- Tommy Hicks (Edmonds)
- James Opher (Styron)
- Michael LeMelle (Brown)
- Patrick Waller (Stowe)

Tom Nowicki played Thomas R. Gray, and Billy Dye played Young Nat Turner.

== Release ==
The documentary was first shown as a "work in progress" at the Full Frame Documentary Film Festival in 2002 and was subsequently edited to be 26 minutes shorter. The documentary screened at multiple film festivals throughout 2003 and aired on PBS' Independent Lens the following year.

== Critical reception ==
Scott Foundas of Variety said the documentary was "insightful, if somewhat foreshortened", finding better the "work in progress" version shared in 2002 that was 26 minutes longer. Foundas said, "While this re-edit is an improvement over the original in other respects — the cutting is more fluid, the narration has been re-recorded and the archival material... has been three-dimensionally embossed... it seems, overall, a more timid, less confrontational movie."

Jonathan Rosenbaum, writing for the Chicago Reader, called the documentary "brilliant" and described Burnett's goal: "Interviewing two dozen historians and theorists, half of them black, Burnett treats all their interpretations, many of which he dramatizes, as equally credible—a radical but plausible approach given how little is known about Turner. He's most interested in charting how the interpretations were arrived at and why those of white and black commentators often differ."

Richard Brody, writing for The New Yorker in "Sixty-two Films That Shaped the Art of Documentary Filmmaking," said "One of the great fiction filmmakers, (Charles) Burnett here deploys his dramatic artistry along with a historian's ardor and a journalist's probing interviews. The film is a work of cinematic historiography, examining how Turner's life, and the rebellion he led, have been depicted and deformed over time. Burnett dramatizes historical events through a multiplicity of performances, and offers a glimpse at his own effort to film them."

== See also ==
- List of films featuring slavery
- Nat Turner's Rebellion
