= Mills Wills =

American politician

Member of the Virginia House of Delegates from Isle of Wight County
- In office 1795–1796 Serving with John Goodrich
- Preceded by: Thomas Goodson; William Hardy
- Succeeded by: James Johnson

Personal details
- Relatives: John Scarsbrooke Wills (brother); James Wills (brother)
- Occupation: Appraiser; militia officer; planter; politician

Military service
- Branch/service: Virginia Militia
- Rank: First lieutenant
- Battles/wars: American Revolutionary War

Mills Wills was an American politician, militia officer, and appraiser that represented Isle of Wight County, in the Virginia House of Delegates from 1795 to 1796.

== Biography ==
Mills Wills was the son of Martha (née Casey) and John Wills, who is mentioned in their will dated from 1765 and probated in 1772 as "of Newport Parish" in Isle of Wight County, Virginia. In his father's will, it was stipulated that Brewer Godwin was to have the care of his son Mills Wills and two other sons, Emanuel and Benjamin Wills. Wills was also a brother of Thomas Wills, John Scarsbrooke Wills, James Wills, Willis Wills, and Micajah Wills.

On December 4, 1777, Wills was made a second lieutenant in the Virginia Militia and assigned under his elder brother Emanuel Wills, who was made captain in place of their elder brother Willis Wills, who was made adjutant. On April 5, 1781, Mills Wills was made first lieutenant to Christopher Dickinson's company.

In 1792, Wills was required by an act passed by the legislature to appraise the value of a bridge built at the expense of Isle of Wight County over Pagan Creek at the town of Smithfield, Virginia. Wills was a member of the Virginia House of Delegates representing Isle of Wight County, Virginia, from 1795 to 1796.

He is listed as a subscriber from Nansemond County, Virginia, in John Marshall's The Life of George Washington, published in 1807.

== Personal life ==
He is known to have had at least 3 children, Jenny, Juley, and Davis Wills.

== Bibliography ==
- Marshall, John (1807). "Subscribers to the Life of Washington". The Life of George Washington. Philadelphia: C. P. Wayne – via Google Books.
- Hening, William Waller (1819). "Chap. LVII. An act to authorise John Sinclair to build a Toll-Bridge, in the County of Isle of Wight.". The Statutes at Large; Being a Collection of all the Laws of Virginia, from the First Session of the Legislature in the Year 1619. Vol. XIII. Philadelphia: Thomas Desilver, No. 253, Market Street – via Google Books.
- Tyler, Lyon G. (1915). "Wills, John Sca[r]sbrook[e]". Encyclopedia of Virginia Biography. New York: Lewis Historical Publishing Company – via the Internet Archive.
- Boddie, III, John Bennett (1938). Seventeenth Century Isle of Wight County, Virginia. Chicago: Chicago Law Printing Company.
- Chapman, Blanche Adams (1938). Wills and administrations of Isle of Wight County, Virginia 1647-1800. Vol. 1–3 – via the Internet Archive.
