= 15th Virginia Regiment =

Continental Army infantry regiment

- Active: 1776-1780
- Allegiance: Continental Congress of the United States
- Type: Infantry
- Size: 728 soldiers
- Part of: Virginia Line
- Engagements: Battle of Brandywine, Battle of Germantown, Battle of Monmouth, Siege of Charleston

Commanders
- Notable commanders: Colonel David Mason, Lieutenant Colonel James Innes; Captain William Grimes

The 15th Virginia Regiment was authorized on September 16, 1776, as a part of the Virginia Line for service with the Continental Army under the command of Col. David Mason of Sussex County. Initially, it included companies from thirteen mostly Tidewater counties: Brunswick, Princess Anne, Nansemond, King William, Westmoreland, Northumberland, Isle of Wight, Sussex, Southampton, Surry, Amelia, Norfolk and Chesterfield Counties. James Innes served as lieutenant Colonel, and Holt Richardson held the rank of Major. In 1778, manpower shortages caused its absorption into the 11th Virginia Regiment. All or part of the regiment saw action at Brandywine, Germantown, Monmouth, and the Siege of Charleston where all of the Regiment was captured in the last. The regiment was disbanded on January 1, 1781.
