= Robert Strange Country House =

Historic house in North Carolina, United States

- U.S. National Register of Historic Places
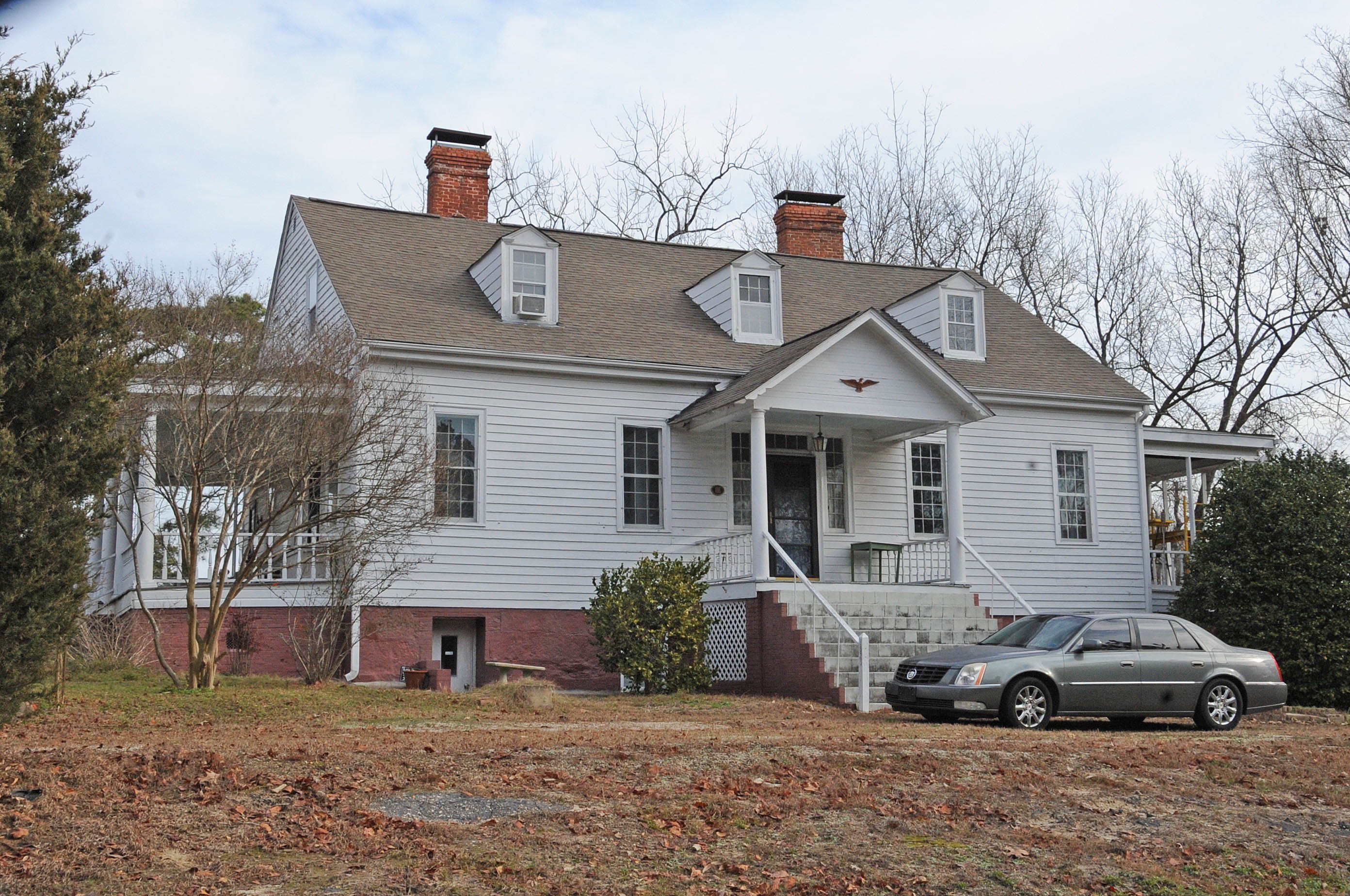

- Location within North Carolina Location within the United States
- Location: 309 Kirkland Dr., Fayetteville, North Carolina
- Coordinates: 35°5′30″N 78°52′28″W
- Area: 5.5 acres (2.2 ha)
- Built: 1825
- Architectural style: Federal
- MPS: Fayetteville MRA
- NRHP reference No.: 83001871
- Added to NRHP: July 7, 1983

Robert Strange Country House, also known as Myrtle Hill, is a historic home located at Fayetteville, Cumberland County, North Carolina. It was built about 1825, and is a 1 1/2-story, gable roofed, Federal style frame dwelling. It has a 1 1/2-story rear ell and features a gable portico supported by two Tuscan order columns. Also on the property are a contributing spring house and a summer kitchen. It was the country home of U.S. Senator Robert Strange (1796-1854). The house stood at the center of Strange's large plantation.

It was listed on the National Register of Historic Places in 1983.
