= David Mason (burgess) =

Virginia planter and politician)

Member of the Virginia House of Delegates for Sussex County
- In office 1782 Serving with Michael Bailey
- Preceded by: Gray Judkins
- Succeeded by: Gray Judkins

Member of the Virginia Senate for Dinwiddie, Southampton and Sussex Counties
- In office 1779-1781
- Preceded by: Edwin Gray
- Succeeded by: John Jones

Member of the House of Burgesses for Sussex County
- In office 1758-1776 Serving with John Edmunds, James Bell, Michael Blow
- Preceded by: Gray Briggs
- Succeeded by: position eliminated

Personal details
- Born: 1731 plantation, Surry County, Colony of Virginia
- Died: 1792 (aged 60–61) Greensville County, Virginia
- Spouse: Mary Eppes
- Relations: David and John Mason Jr. (nephews)
- Children: Littleberry, Thomas, Nathaniel, David Jr., Henry, William, Littleton, Elizabeth and Mary
- Parent: John Mason
- Occupation: planter, politician

David Mason (March 16, 1731- February 9, 1792) was a Virginia planter and politician in Sussex County who represented the county for more than two decades in the House of Burgesses, then became a prominent patriot during the American Revolutionary War, serving in all five Revolutionary Conventions as well as Colonel of the 15th Virginia Regiment of the Virginia Line of the Continental Army, and later briefly served in the Virginia Senate and Virginia House of Delegates.

== Early life ==
Born in what was then Surry County, but which became Sussex County in his lifetime, his father was Captain John Mason (d. 1755, who also served as the Surry County sheriff) and his mother was named Elizabeth. The family included at least one older brother Capt. (or Major) John Mason (1716-1785). Another source lists additional brothers James, Daniel, Joseph, Christopher and Isaac. One source refers to him as David Epes Mason, he married into the Eppes family of Bermuda Hundred further upstream on the James River, as discussed further below. Complicating matters, his elder brother John (1716-1785) named one of his sons David(1752-1820), and that David Mason not only served as a captain of the 11th Virginia Regiment during the Revolutionary War and later as colonel of the Sussex militia, but lived in Waverly (the Sussex county seat, in a house he purchased in 1780 from Captain Irby), became known as a harsh slave-owner and was ultimately killed by a slave.

== Career ==
His father gave this man 300 acres of land on March 16, 1752, likely on the occasion either of his 21st birthday (hence reaching legal age) or as a wedding gift, since he married Mary Eppes that year. Mason bought a 1400-acre tract on the north side of Three Creeks from William and Sarah Avent. The area was also known as Joseph or Otterdam Swamp, and the house Mason constructed and called "Shell Bank" survived in considerable disrepair until razed in the mid-1940s. Mason, presumably like his father and in-laws, was a planter and used enslaved labor to operate his plantations. In 1776, he followed his father's example and gave 746 acres on the north side of the Three Creeks to his son Thomas Mason, who married the following year, although after the conflict Thomas Mason lived on the north side of Poplar Swamp in the Henry Crossroads area and in 1812 may have moved his family to Southampton County, although the 1820 census shows him as owning 21 slaves in Sussex County. In the 1787 Virginia tax census, his eldest son Littleberry Mason owned 12 Blacks more than 16 years old, 20 younger slaves, as well as eight horses, 35 cattle and a 2-wheeled carriage. As explained below, if John Mason and/or Peyton Mason were also sons rather than nephews, they also owned slaves in Sussex County in 1787. Also to the extent they were this man's sons, Nathaniel Mason owned 8 adult slaves and 11 enslaved children in Brunswick County, and William Mason owned nine adult and seven enslaved children in Greensville County.

In 1756 Mason became one of the early justices of the peace for Sussex County (established from Surry County in 1754, with his elder brother having been one of the initial justices and remaining in office). David Mason remained such for 17 years, as well as served as the county treasurer.

Before the American Revolutionary War, Mason represented Sussex County for nearly two decades in the House of Burgesses, beginning in 1758 alongside veteran politician John Edmunds for over a decade until Edmunds' death in 1770, then in the next two sessions alongside first James Bell, then Richard Blum (who also died), and finally alongside Michael Blow from 1774 until Governor Dunmore dissolved that legislative body.

As the schism with Britain widened, Mason served in all five Virginia Revolutionary Conventions, including on a drafting committees with non-relative George Mason. David Mason represented Sussex County alongside Michael Blow in the first Virginia Revolutionary Convention, then he and Henry Gee represented Sussex County for the next four revolutionary conventions, before creation of the Virginia House of Delegates and Senate of Virginia. Mason and Gee had both held local offices as well as served on the Albemarle Parish vestry and in 1775 on the county's 28-member Committee of Safety.

Mason served as colonel of the 15th Virginia Regiment beginning in 1777, with his eldest son Littleberry Mason (1753-1807) as the regimental paymaster. Col. Mason later commanded a regiment. While this man as Colonel was responsible for equipping and inoculating the local militia, and gave his bond on June 8, 1776, his nephew Captain James Mason was responsible for organizing the local militia in the conflict. Complicating matters, other men named David Mason, served as enlisted man with the 5th and as lieutenant then captain in the 11th Virginia Regiment. Perhaps because this Col. Mason took an unauthorized trip back to visit his wife during the conflict, he was not named the County Lieutenant (head of the county militia) in 1785 by Gov. Patrick Henry, and soon may have left the county, as his legislative service detailed below also ended.

In 1776 Mason was elected to the Virginia Senate for the district consisting of Dinwiddie, Southampton and Sussex Counties, but Edwin Gray succeeded him the following year. Mason was again elected to the Virginia Senate in 1779, as Gray and perhaps longtime county clerk Augustine Claiborne (who had won prior elections for the seat) were disqualified. Mason then ended his overt political career by serving in the Virginia House of Delegates during the 1782 session.

== Personal life ==
According to modern genealogists, Mason married Mary Eppes, who was of the First Families of Virginia and could trace her descent from Francis Epes or Epes who represented Shirley Hundred in the House of Burgesses in 1631/2, and his son Francis Jr. who represented Henrico County in 1670-1676 in that same body, as well as was one of the captains of the Guards of the Counties and was a justice of the peace. They had several children, including Littleberry Mason (1753-1806) who became a lawyer, married and remained in Sussex County, as did his brother Thomas Mason (1755-1821). However, Nathaniel Mason (1757-1794) moved to Brunswick County after serving as captain of the 4th Virginia Regiment, and Frances Mason (b. 1762) and died as infant. This sisters Elizabeth Mason Richardson (1760-1833) and Mary Mason Williamson (born 1763) moved to Greensville County after their respective marriage. The remaining children were David Mason Jr. (1769-died before 1832), Henry Mason (b. 1771-died before 1821), Littleton Mason (b. 1774-1798), and William Mason (b. 1776). Littleberry and Littleton were common names in the Eppes family. By contrast, Lyon Gardiner Tyler did not name this man's wife but claims his will was "proven" on June 16, 1785 and named his sons as William, John, James, Henry, David, Benjamin, Peyton and Joseph, and his married daughters as Rebecca Mason Rives (wife of Timothy Rives), Elizabeth Rives and Mary Jeffries. However, this may actually be his elder brother's will. That man's heir (this man's nephew) also David Mason owned slaves in Sussex County in 1787.

== Death and legacy ==
Mason sold his Sussex home Shell Bank in 1777 to Williamsburg lawyer John Tazewell, whose family rented it out until 1799, when they sold it to this man's nephew John Mason, who had continued the family's political tradition by becoming elected to the Virginia House of Delegates.

The circumstances of this patriot's death are unclear. Local circuit court clerk and historian Gary Williams believes it was documented in a nearby county and those straightened circumstances explain the absent will. Although Lyon Gardiner Tyler wrote the will of this patriot was "proven" in 1785 (indicating his death and the beginning of the probate process), a David Mason was listed on the 1787 tax census for Sussex County, as were this man's two eldest sons. Works Progress Administration researchers stated this David Mason died intestate (without a will) on February 9, 1792, which date is accepted by the published Dorman modern genealogy. Complicating matters, one modern historian found a 1795 record indicating two men were arrested, convicted and executed in Sussex County for poisoning a "David Mason" (several years after this man's death), and that David Mason was ordered to pay for the cost of defending them.

Following the Civil War, his descendant Robert Lee Mason (1859-1918) (son of Dr. Robert H. Mason and Vannie Virginia Drewry Mason), a merchant at Mason's Depot and Sussex County's commissioner of revenue (1885-1891), became the last Republican to seek a house seat until 2005. However, he lost even his home precinct to Democrat Leonidas Yarrell.
