= Henry Taylor (patriot) =

American politician (1737–1781)

Member of the Virginia House of Delegates representing Southampton County
- In office October 7, 1776 – May 3, 1778 Serving with Edwin Gray Sr., Richard Kello
- Preceded by: position created
- Succeeded by: John Rogers

Member of the Virginia House of Burgesses from Southampton County
- In office May 1769 – July 1776 Serving with Edwin Gray Sr.
- Preceded by: Benjamin Symmons
- Succeeded by: position eliminated

Personal details
- Born: December 20, 1737 Southampton County, Virginia Virginia Colony, British America
- Died: June 14, 1781 (aged 43)
- Spouse: Temperance
- Profession: Planter, politician

Henry Taylor (December 20, 1737 – June 14, 1781 ) was a planter, patriot and politician from Southampton County who represented the county in the House of Burgesses, Virginia Revolutionary conventions and Virginia House of Delegates.

== Early and family life ==
The son of Henry Taylor(d. 1743) of Charles City County and his wife, the former Patience Kinchen, had several brothers and sisters. Like his elder half brothers Ethelred Taylor (1699-1775) and William Taylor(d. 1772), Henry Taylor represented Southampton County in the Virginia House of Burgesses, and would be succeeded by his brother John Taylor representing Southampton County in the Virginia House of Delegates (again after a gap, his own son John having already died). His brother Kinchen Taylor (d.1771) was a merchant as well as planter. Another brother was James Taylor.

In 1758, this man married the former Temperance Peterson or Batte (1738-1798) in Brunswick County. They had at least three sons (Ethelred, John and Henry) as well as daughters Charlotte, Mary Taylor Blake and Martha.

== Career ==
Taylor was a planter, who like his father and brothers farmed using enslaved labor (although John, who had inherited a parcel known as Indian Town would emancipate some slaves, but received others upon his remarriage). Henry Taylor also administered the estate of his merchant brother Kinchen Taylor after 1772, and in 1776 bought from his brothers Ethelred, John and James a parcel of land that had belonged to their father. Although this man had died six years before the Virginia Tax Census of 1787, his widow Temperance Taylor owned ten enslaved adult Blacks, eight between 16 and 20 years old, 4 horses and 11 cattle, as well as a 2 wheeled carriage. Southampton County voters first elected Taylor as their representative to the House of Burgesses in 1769, and re-elected him until Virginia's last royal governor, Lord Dunmore, suspended that body. Meanwhile, Taylor also served on the local Committee of Safety, and his brother or son John led one of the county's seven militia companies, and his son Captain Henry Taylor successfully recruited a company of "minute men" before war was declared, and garrisoned a station at Suffolk after Lord Dunmore's forces destroyed Norfolk in January 1776. Southampton voters also elected Taylor and Edwin Gray as their representatives to all five Virginia Revolutionary Conventions, although here is no record proving that Taylor attended the Fourth Revolutionary Convention. Taylor also won election to the first session of the Virginia House of Delegates, and won re-election once.

== Death and legacy ==
Taylor died on June 14, 1781, and his widow was appointed administrator of his estate.
