= Robert Strange (American politician) =

American politician

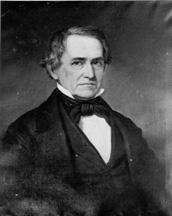

United States Senator from North Carolina
- In office December 5, 1836 – November 16, 1840
- Preceded by: Willie P. Mangum
- Succeeded by: William A. Graham

Member of the North Carolina House of Representatives
- In office 1821–1823; 1826

Personal details
- Born: September 20, 1796 Manchester, Virginia, U.S.
- Died: February 19, 1854 (aged 57) Fayetteville, North Carolina, U.S.
- Party: Democratic
- Spouse: Jane Kirkland (m. 1817)
- Children: 3
- Relatives: James Strange French (nephew)

Robert Strange (September 20, 1796 – February 19, 1854) was an American politician who served as a Democratic U.S. senator from the state of North Carolina between 1836 and 1840.

== Biography ==
Strange was born in Manchester, Virginia. He attended New Oxford Academy and Washington College (now Washington and Lee University) in Lexington, Virginia. He graduated from Hampden–Sydney College in south central Virginia in 1815 and practiced law in Fayetteville, North Carolina.

He was elected to the North Carolina House of Commons (1821–1823 and 1826) and was a judge of the superior court of North Carolina (1827–1836).

Strange was elected as a Jacksonian (later Democrat) to the United States Senate to fill the vacancy caused by the resignation of Willie Person Mangum and served from December 5, 1836, to November 16, 1840, when he resigned and resumed the practice of law in Fayetteville, where he died on February 19, 1854, and was buried in the family burial ground at Myrtle Hill, near Fayetteville.

Strange was an ardent and active Freemason, serving as the Grand Master of the Grand Lodge of North Carolina, Ancient, Free and Accepted Masons from 1812 through 1814. He also served as Master of Phoenix Lodge No. 8, A. F. & A. M., in Fayetteville, NC, for the year 1826.

Strange commanded the Fayetteville Independent Light Infantry (FILI), an independent militia company in Fayetteville, NC. In this role Strange served as the escort for the Marquis de Lafayette when he visited Fayetteville on March 5, 1825.

The 1820 Census for Fayetteville, North Carolina shows that Robert Strange was the enslaver of four black people.

A number of people read law with him, including his nephew James Strange French. He was the author of Eoneguski, or the Cherokee Chief, which has been called the first North Carolina novel.

The Robert Strange Country House was listed on the National Register of Historic Places in 1983.

U.S. Senate
| Preceded by Willie P. Mangum | U.S. senator (Class 3) from North Carolina; 1836–1840; Served alongside: Bedford Brown | Succeeded by William A. Graham |
