= Thomas Van Swearingen =

American politician (1784–1822)

Member of the U.S. House of Representatives from Virginia's 2nd district
- In office March 4, 1819 – August 19, 1822
- Preceded by: Edward Colston
- Succeeded by: James Stephenson

Member of the Virginia House of Delegates from Jefferson County
- In office 1814–1815; Alongside George Humphreys

Personal details
- Born: May 5, 1784 Shepherdstown, Virginia
- Died: August 19, 1822 (aged 38) Shepherdstown, Virginia
- Party: Federalist

Thomas Van Swearingen (May 5, 1784 – August 19, 1822) was a U.S. representative from Virginia.

== Biography ==
Born near Shepherdstown, Virginia (now West Virginia), Van Swearingen attended the common schools. He served as member of the State House of Delegates 1814–1816.

Van Swearingen was elected to the Sixteenth and Seventeenth Congresses and served from March 4, 1819, until his death in Shepherdstown, Virginia, August 19, 1822. He was interred in Elmwood Cemetery.

He was the third cousin of U.S Representative Henry D. Swearingen of Ohio.

== Electoral history ==
- 1819; Van Swearingen was elected to the U.S. House of Representatives with 55.71% of the vote, defeating fellow Federalist Edward Colston.
- 1821; Van Swearingen was re-elected with 83.21% of the vote, defeating Independent Robert Bailey.

== See also ==
- List of members of the United States Congress who died in office (1790–1899)

== Sources ==
- United States Congress. "Thomas Van Swearingen (id: V000059)". Biographical Directory of the United States Congress.

U.S. House of Representatives
| Preceded by Edward Colston | Member of the U.S. House of Representatives from Virginia's 2nd congressional district 1819–1822 | Succeeded by James Stephenson |
