= James Stephenson (congressman) =

American politician (1764–1833)

Member of the U.S. House of Representatives from Virginia's 16th district
- In office March 4, 1823 – March 3, 1825
- Preceded by: John Randolph
- Succeeded by: William Armstrong

Member of the U.S. House of Representatives from Virginia's 2nd district
- In office October 28, 1822 – March 3, 1823
- Preceded by: Thomas Van Swearingen
- Succeeded by: Arthur Smith
- In office March 4, 1809 – March 3, 1811
- Preceded by: John Morrow
- Succeeded by: John Baker
- In office March 4, 1803 – March 3, 1805
- Preceded by: David Holmes
- Succeeded by: John Morrow

Member of the Virginia House of Delegates from Berkeley County
- In office 1806; Alongside Philip C. Pendleton
- In office 1800–1802; Alongside Alexander White, Joseph Crane

Personal details
- Born: March 20, 1764 Gettysburg, Province of Pennsylvania, British America
- Died: August 7, 1833 (aged 69) Harpers Ferry, Virginia, U.S. (now West Virginia)
- Resting place: Edge Hill Cemetery, Charles Town, Virginia, US
- Party: Federalist
- Occupation: lawyer

Military service
- Branch/service: Virginia militia
- Rank: Major
- Battles/wars: Northwest Indian War; St. Clair's Defeat; Whisky Rebellion

James Stephenson (March 20, 1764 – August 7, 1833) was an American politician and soldier who, as a Federalist, served in the Virginia House of Delegates as well as in the United States House of Representatives.

== Early and family life ==
Born in Gettysburg in the Province of Pennsylvania to Maria Reed and her husband James Stephenson; the family moved to Martinsburg, Berkeley County, Virginia (now West Virginia) by 1790. His elder brother William Stephenson would move to Knoxville, Tennessee, as would their mother and sisters after their father's death in 1804. His younger brother Benjamin Stephenson (1769-1822) would move to Kentucky, then the Illinois Territory, where he operated a general store and also served as a sheriff and militia leader before becoming a Congressman for the new state.

On May 17, 1792, Stephenson married Ann Cunningham in Berkeley County, but records remain only of their youngest children, who remained in the area: George Benjamin Stephenson (a medical doctor, who inherited the farm and moved to Washington D.C. during or after the American Civil War) and Anne Stephenson Beckham (her husband, Harpers Ferry mayor Fontaine Beckham, died in John Brown's raid, and his death as well as the treason conviction led to the resulting executions).

== Career ==
Young James Stephenson volunteered to serve in Virginia's militia, and he led a company under General Arthur St. Clair in his expedition against Native Americans in the Ohio River Valley. He survived the ignominious St. Clair's Defeat in 1791, and, three years later, helped lead forces sent to quell the Whiskey Rebellion. At some point, Stephenson rose to the rank of Major, as well as Brigade inspector.

Stephenson served as a local magistrate and was a farmer and slaveholder. He owned two slaves in 1810, six slaves in 1820 (half of them children), and four slaves in the 1830 census (all adults, one male and one female older than 55 years). Voters elected Stephenson as one of their delegates (a part-time position) in the Virginia House of Delegates in 1800–1803, and again in 1806 and 1807.

Between those terms, Stephenson was elected as a Federalist to the Eighth Congress (March 4, 1803 – March 3, 1805) with 53.57% of the vote, defeating Democratic-Republican Osburn Sprigg.

Stephenson was again elected as Federalist to the Eleventh Congress (March 4, 1809 – March 3, 1811) with 57.59% of the vote, defeating Democratic-Republican John Marrow.

Stephenson was elected as a Federalist to the Seventeenth Congress to fill the vacancy caused by the death of Thomas Van Swearingen.

He was reelected as a Crawford Federalist to the Eighteenth Congress and served from October 28, 1822, to March 3, 1825.

== Death and legacy ==
Stephenson died in Harpers Ferry (now West Virginia) on August 27, 1833. He is buried at Edge Hill Cemetery in Charles Town; a memorial was also erected to commemorate his widow, who died on January 1, 1865.

U.S. House of Representatives
Preceded by David Holmes	Member of the U.S. House of Representatives from Virginia's 2nd congressional district 1803–1805	Succeeded by John Morrow
Preceded by John Morrow	Member of the U.S. House of Representatives from Virginia's 2nd congressional district 1809–1811	Succeeded by John Baker
Preceded by Thomas Van Swearingen	Member of the U.S. House of Representatives from Virginia's 2nd congressional district 1822–1823	Succeeded by Arthur Smith
Preceded by John Randolph	Member of the U.S. House of Representatives from Virginia's 16th congressional district 1823–1825	Succeeded by John Randolph
