= John C. Gray =

American politician (1783–1823)

John Cowper Gray

Member of the U.S. House of Representatives from Virginia's 20th district
- In office August 28, 1820 – March 3, 1821
- Preceded by: James Johnson
- Succeeded by: Arthur Smith

Member of the Virginia House of Delegates representing Southampton County
- In office 1821–1823
- Preceded by: William Bailey
- In office 1804–1805 Serving with Henry Blow
- Preceded by: James Gee

Personal details
- Born: 1783 Southampton County, Virginia Virginia Colony
- Died: May 18, 1823
- Party: Democratic-Republican
- Profession: planter, politician

John Cowper Gray (1783 – May 18, 1823) was a Virginia planter and politician aligned with the Democratic-Republican Party who served in the Virginia House of Delegates before and after his partial term as U.S. Congressman from Virginia's 20th congressional district. His middle name is used to distinguish him from an unrelated contemporary whose family emigrated from Pennsylvania into Virginia's western mountains and who represented Monroe County, as well as two other men who served much later in the Virginia General Assembly from other Virginia counties.

== Early and family life ==
Born in Southampton County, Virginia, to the former Elizabeth Grizzie Cowper and her husband James Gray, the eldest surviving son of that Revolutionary War veteran had a sister Elizabeth Grizzie Groves who married her first cousin Wills Cowper of nearby Nansemond County and his younger brother George Gilbert Gustavus married after this man's death but died childless. His paternal Gray ancestors had emigrated to Virginia south of the James River by 1820. His grandfather Joseph Gray and his uncle Edwin Gray Sr. had represented the area that became Southampton County in the House of Burgesses. That uncle had also represented the county at all Virginia's Revolutionary Conventions as well as led the local Committee of Safety, before serving in the Virginia House of Delegates before his death when this man was a boy. His son (this boy's cousin) Edwin Gray also represented Southampton County in the House of Delegates, then served seven terms in the U.S. House of Representatives before resigning in 1813 and leaving the area. Meanwhile, Gray received an education appropriate to his class.

== Career ==
Southampton County voters elected John C. Gray as one of their representatives in the Virginia House of Delegates in 1803 and he served alongside veteran delegate Henry Blow for two years, from 1804 through 1806. When Congressman James Johnson resigned, Gray served the remainder of his term in the Sixteenth Congress, from August 28, 1820, to March 3, 1821, but failed to win re-election, and so was succeeded by Arthur Smith. However, Gray then again won election to the House of Delegates, and served from 1821 through his death in 1823. In the 1810 census, Gray's household (possibly erroneous, though smaller than the household of his cousin Edwin Gray) included no white males older than 25, but two white women older than 45, as well as a white youth younger than 25 and ten enslaved people. A decade later Gray resided with a free colored boy younger than 14, as well as free white woman older than 45 and thirteen slaves (two of them girls younger than 14). Gray died May 18, 1823.

U.S. House of Representatives
Preceded by James Johnson	Member of the U.S. House of Representatives from Virginia's 20th congressional district August 28, 1820 – March 3, 1821	Succeeded by Arthur Smith
