= Arthur Smith (congressman) =

U.S. Representative from Virginia (1785–1853)

Member of the Virginia House of Delegates from Isle of Wight County
- In office 1836–1840
- Preceded by: Joel Holleman
- Succeeded by: Joel Holleman
- In office 1818–1819; Alongside Ely Exum, John Crocker

Member of the U.S. House of Representatives from Virginia
- In office March 4, 1821 – March 4, 1825
- Preceded by: John C. Gray (20th); James Stephenson (2nd)
- Succeeded by: John Floyd (20th); James Trezvant (2nd)
- Constituency: 20th district (1821-23); 2nd district (1823-25)

Personal details
- Born: November 15, 1785 Windsor Castle, Smithfield, Virginia
- Died: March 30, 1853 (aged 67) Smithfield, Virginia, U.S.
- Resting place: Windsor Castle, Smithfield, Virginia
- Party: Democratic-Republican
- Education: College of William and Mary
- Occupation: lawyer, planter

Military service
- Allegiance: United States of America
- Rank: Colonel
- Battles/wars: War of 1812

Arthur Smith (November 15, 1785 – March 30, 1853) was a U.S. representative from Virginia.

== Biography ==
Born at "Windsor Castle," near Smithfield, Isle of Wight County, Virginia, Smith attended an academy at Smithfield, Virginia, and graduated from the College of William and Mary, Williamsburg, Virginia. He studied law, was admitted to the bar in 1808, and commenced practice in Smithfield, Virginia. He also engaged in agricultural pursuits.

Smith served as colonel in the War of 1812. He also served as member of the Virginia House of Delegates from 1818 to 1820.

Smith was elected as a Democratic-Republican to the Seventeenth Congress and reelected as a Crawford Republican to the Eighteenth Congress (March 4, 1821 – March 3, 1825). He was not a candidate for renomination in 1824.

Smith resumed the practice of law, and again served as member of the Virginia House of Delegates in 1836–1841. He died in Smithfield, Virginia, March 30, 1853. He was interred in the family burying ground on Windsor Castle estate, near Smithfield, Virginia.

== Electoral history ==
- 1823; Smith was re-elected unopposed.

== Sources ==
- United States Congress. "Arthur Smith (id: S000515)". Biographical Directory of the United States Congress.

U.S. House of Representatives
Preceded by John C. Gray	Member of the U.S. House of Representatives from Virginia's 20th congressional district 1821–1823	Succeeded by John Floyd
Preceded by James Stephenson	Member of the U.S. House of Representatives from Virginia's 2nd congressional district 1823–1825	Succeeded by James Trezvant
