= James Strange French =

American novelist and attorney (1807-1886)

James Strange French (1807 – 1886) was an American lawyer, novelist, and later hotel keeper. He is best known for representing several slaves that were charged with participating in Nat Turner's Rebellion in 1831.

== Biography ==
James Strange French was born in Dinwiddie County, Virginia, in 1807. He was educated at the College of William & Mary and the University of Virginia, then read law with his uncle Robert Strange in Fayetteville, North Carolina.

In 1831, French represented several slaves accused of participating in Nat Turner's Rebellion. French was joined in defending slaves by Thomas Ruffin Gray, and William C. Parker. In 1835, French helped secure the commutation of a sentence of a slave, Boson, who had been sentenced to death following the rebellion, then escaped from the Sussex County jail.

French was the author of at least two novels. The first, Sketches and Eccentricities of Col. David Crockett of West Tennessee, appeared in 1833. The second, Elkswatawa, was set in the early nineteenth century. It was a romance set around Tecumseh's War. It portrayed Native Americans sympathetically and, thus, may contain some clues to French's attitudes towards the legal system's treatment of Natives and slaves. Edgar Allan Poe published a critical review of it in Southern Literary Messenger in 1836. Poe, who had studied with French at the University of Virginia, was quite critical of the plot and prose. French married Laura J. George on June 6, 1850, in "Willow Grove", Tazewell County, Virginia.

French died on February 7, 1886, in Gordonsville, Virginia, at the age of 78.

== Bibliography ==
- French, Scott (2004). The Rebellious Slave: Nat Turner in American Memory. OCLC 53477485.
