= Fortsville =

Historic house in Virginia, United States

- U.S. National Register of Historic Places
- Virginia Landmarks Register
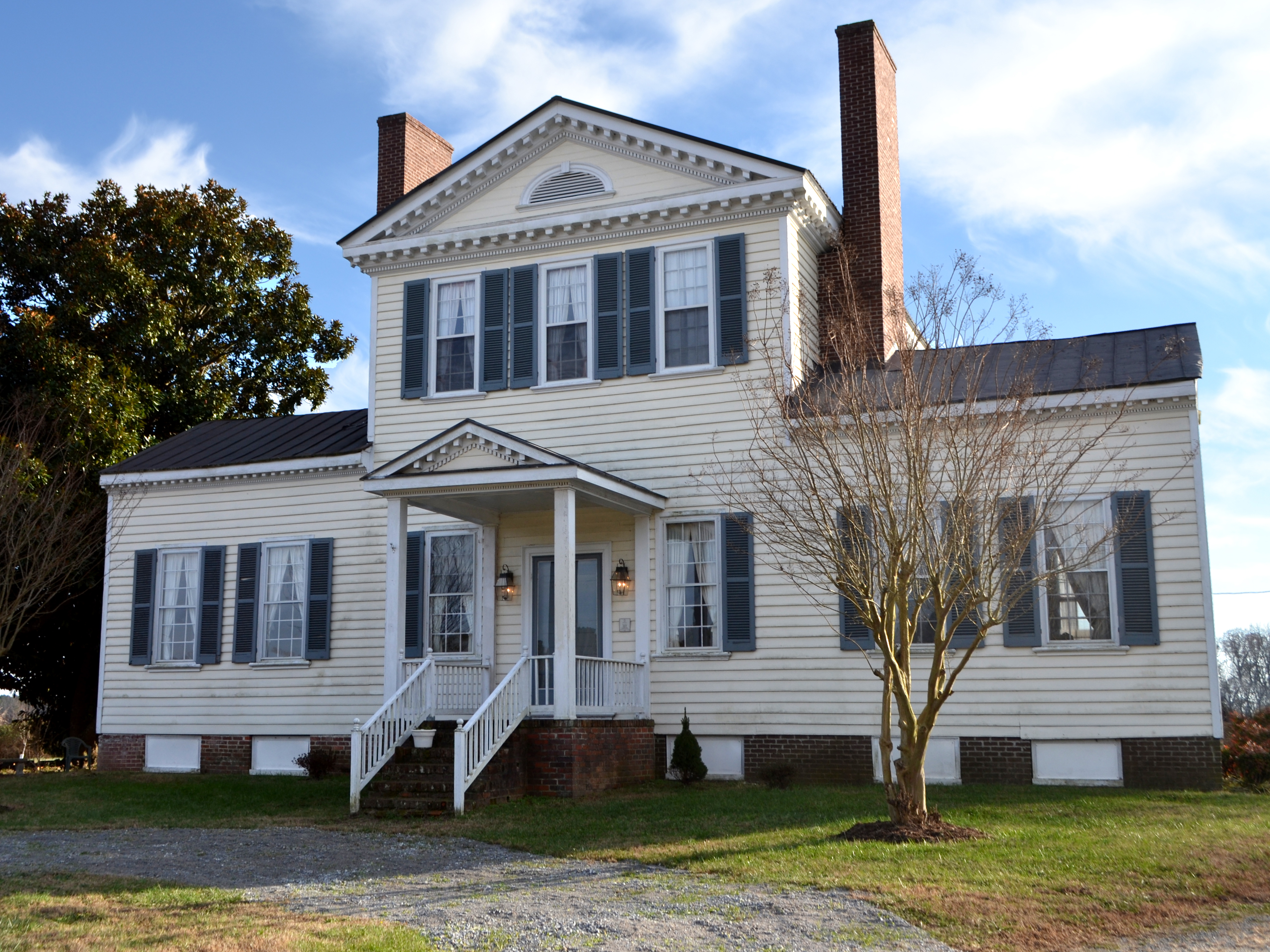
- Front of the house

- Location within Virginia Location within the United States
- Location: Jct. of VA 634 and 626, near Grizzard, Virginia
- Coordinates: 36°42′47″N 77°24′51″W
- Area: 100 acres (40 ha)
- NRHP reference No.: 70000828
- VLR No.: 091-0008

Significant dates
- Added to NRHP: September 15, 1970
- Designated VLR: June 2, 1970

Fortsville is a historic home located near Grizzard, Sussex County, Virginia in the Palladian architectural style.

== History ==
Virginia politician and diplomat John Y. Mason (1799–1859) moved into Fortsville in 1821 after his marriage to Mary Ann Fort, whose father had built the mansion. Some consider it a replica of the Peyton Randolph house in Williamsburg. Although neglected in the 20th century, it was restored and now often available for rental.

== Architecture ==
Its present form consists of a two-story, three-bay, front-gabled central section flanked by one-story, two-bay wings, with a center section extension completed in 1792. The frame dwelling is set on a brick foundation. It was listed on the National Register of Historic Places in 1970.
