= Edwin Gray Sr. =

American planter and politician

Edwin Gray

Member of the Virginia Senate representing Southampton, Sussex and Dinwiddie Counties
- In office 1777–1778
- Preceded by: David Mason
- Succeeded by: David Mason

Member of the Virginia House of Delegates representing Southampton County
- In office 1776–1777 Serving with Henry Taylor
- Preceded by: position created
- Succeeded by: Richard Kello

Member of the Virginia House of Burgesses from Southampton County
- In office May 8, 1769 – July 1776 Serving with Henry Taylor
- Preceded by: Joseph Gray
- Succeeded by: position eliminated

Personal details
- Born: July 18, 1743 Southampton County, Virginia Virginia Colony, British America
- Died: June 1, 1790 (aged 46)
- Education: College of William & Mary
- Profession: Planter, politician

Edwin Gray (July 18, 1743 – before June 1790) was a planter, patriot and politician from Southampton County who represented the county in the House of Burgesses, Virginia Revolutionary conventions, Virginia House of Delegates and Virginia Senate.

== Early life and education ==
Born in what soon became Southampton County, Virginia (but was then Isle of Wight County), the son of burgess Joseph Gray and his wife Sarah, Gray had a younger brother James (who died circa 1787), as well as three sisters who survived to adulthood. He received a private education suitable to his class before traveling across the James River to Williamsburg to attend the College of William & Mary in 1753. His brother James served as a captain during the Revolutionary War, was wounded at the Battle of Germantown, and married Elizabeth Grizzie Cowper.

== Career ==
His father, Joseph Gray, who had been a prominent force in Southampton County for decades, died in 1769, and the following year the local court named Edwin and his brother as executors per the will which Joseph had signed in August 1769. Edwin received 1060 acres and named enslaved people, as well as an additional 640 acres on the south side of the Nottoway River, which the will acknowledged were subject to heavy debts, so he might not receive them. The will named his married sisters, and stated each had already received their inheritance (presumably as dowries), while his widow received a life estate (including a 790-acre plantation and named enslaved persons), which James would then inherit after her death.

Southampton County voters elected Gray and Henry Taylor (1737-1781) as their representatives to the House of Burgesses for both sessions of the House of Burgesses which began in 1769, and re-elected the pair each term until Virginia's last colonial governor, Lord Dunmore, suspended the legislature and Virginia declared its independence in 1776. Gary may have chaired the county's Committee of Safety, as well as served with Henry Taylor, Benjamin Ruffin Jr., Thomas Edmunds and Rev. George Gurley. Voters also elected Gray and Taylor as their representative to all five Revolutionary Conventions, and the first session of the Virginia House of Delegates in 1776. Longtime Southampton County clerk Richard Kello replaced Gray as a delegate in 1777 because Gray won election to the Virginia Senate, representing Southampton and nearby Dinwiddie and Sussex Counties, and he served until the 1779, session, when both he and George Brooke of relatively distant Essex County were both disqualified (possibly because he was also elected to the House of Delegates in that session, but more likely for election improprieties since David Mason was elected as that district's senator).

Both Edwin Gray and his brother James operated plantations using enslaved labor. In the 1787 Virginia tax census, Gray owned a dozen enslaved adult Blacks, ten between sixteen and twenty years old, eleven horses, and fifty cattle, as well as both a four-wheeled chaise and a two-wheeled chair, whereas James' estate owned only two enslaved Blacks, two horses, and nineteen cattle.

== Personal life ==
Gray married Julianna Godwin, from a prominent family in nearby Nansemond county. They had at least four sons who survived him— Joseph who died about 1798, Thomas who married Anne Cocke Browne and died age 75 in 1831, Edwin Gray who continued his father's political legacy, and Henry Mills Gray who was still underage so his elder brother Edwin became his guardian in 1796, as well as a daughter, Mary, who married Daniel Simmons.

== Death and legacy ==
Gray wrote his last will on September 3, 1788 was admitted to probate in Southampton County in June 1790, with his widow, Julianna Godwin, appointed as his administrator. However, she died by April 15, 1796, when their third son, Edwin, was granted administration of her estate.

His son, also Edwin Gray, succeeded him as one of Southampton County's delegates in Richmond (probably in his lifetime), and then won election and repeated re-election to the U.S. House of Representatives, serving from 1799 until retiring in 1813. Edwin Gray Jr. owned 10 slaves in the 1810 federal census. He died in Nansemond County, Virginia about 1817.
