= Grizzard, Virginia =

- Unincorporated community
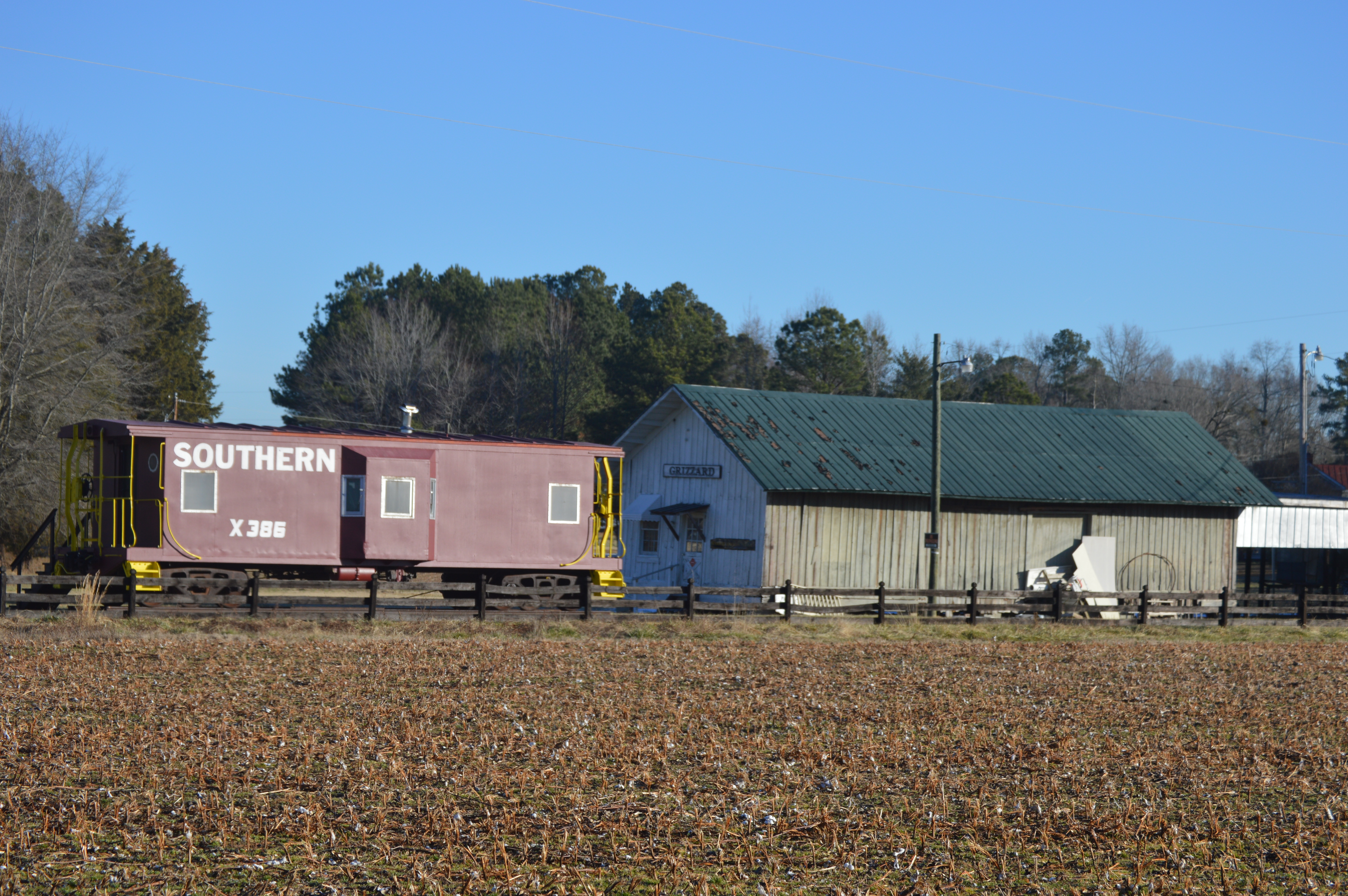
- Former train station

- Location within Virginia Location within the United States
- Coordinates: 36°43′36″N 77°26′15″W
- Country: United States
- State: Virginia
- County: Sussex
- Elevation: 128 ft (39 m)
- Time zone: UTC-5 (Eastern (EST))
  - Summer (DST): UTC-4 (EDT)
- Area code: 804
- GNIS feature ID: 1477378

Grizzard is an unincorporated community in Sussex County, Virginia, United States. Grizzard is 6.5 miles (10.5 km) east-northeast of Emporia.

Fortsville was listed on the National Register of Historic Places in 1970.
