= Joseph Gray (burgess) =

Colonial Virginia politician (1715–1769)

Member of the Virginia House of Burgesses from Southampton County
- In office 1758–1769 Serving with William Taylor, Benjamin Simmons
- Preceded by: Benjamin Simmons
- Succeeded by: Edwin Gray Sr.

Member of the Virginia House of Burgesses from Isle of Wight County
- In office 1753–1758 Serving with Ethelred Taylor, Henry Taylor
- Preceded by: Thomas Jarrell
- Succeeded by: Benjamin Simmons
- In office 1736–1749 Serving with John Simmons
- Preceded by: Matthew Kenchin
- Succeeded by: Robert Burwell

Personal details
- Born: before 1715 Virginia Colony, British America
- Died: 1769 Southampton County, Colony of Virginia
- Children: Edwin Gray Sr. (son)
- Profession: planter, politician

Military service
- Branch/service: Virginia militia
- Rank: Colonel

Joseph Gray (before 1715 – 1769) was a Colonial Virginia planter and politician. He served in the House of Burgesses from Isle of Wight County and Southampton County.

== Early life ==
Joseph Gray was probably born in Surry County, although his father also owned plantations in neighboring Isle of Wight County. Gray could trace his ancestry to Thomas Gray who emigrated from England to the Jamestown colony by 1620, and bought land across the James River from the colony's capital, in what was then Surry County, but part of which became Isle of Wight County. His paternal grandfather, William Gray, served in the House of Burgesses. His father was either burgess William Gray Jr. or his brother Gilbert. Joseph Gray received an education appropriate to his class.

== Career ==
Like his father and other ancestors, Gray farmed using enslaved labor, and by his death owned at least three plantations, but also owed creditors significant amounts of money, as he acknowledged in his last will and testament.
Isle of Wight voters elected Joseph Gray as one of their representatives in the House of Burgesses in 1736. It remains unclear whether he or his fellow burgess John Simmons succeeded Matthew Kenchin, who was elected one of the burgesses for that session but died before that session convened, though both men were clearly re-elected in the 1748-1749 session which created Southampton County. Although Gray was not elected as one of Southampton County's first representatives in the House of Burgesses, one of those first two, Thomas Jarrell, died before that assembly's second session and Joseph Gray succeeded him, then was re-elected alongside William Taylor, who had succeeded Ethelred Taylor.

Gray also was colonel of the county's first militia regiment.

== Personal life ==
Gray married Sarah, who survived him. They had at least two sons, Edwin Gray Sr. and James Gray, and daughters Mary, Ann and Sarah.

Gray served as churchwarden beginning some time before 1749, first in the parish in Isle of Wight County, then in Nottoway Parish, which was subdivided in 1762.

Gray wrote his last will and testament in August 1769 and died before the year ended, although the local court did not recognize his sons as executors until the next year. His grave site is now unknown. His grandsons Edwin Gray and John C. Gray served in the United States House of Representatives from southern Virginia in the early 19th century.
