= Edwin Gray =

American politician

Member of the U.S. House of Representatives from Virginia's 19 district
- In office March 4, 1803 – March 4, 1813
- Preceded by: John Taliaferro
- Succeeded by: Peterson Goodwyn

Member of the U.S. House of Representatives from 's 10 district
- In office March 4, 1799 – March 4, 1803
- Preceded by: Carter B. Harrison
- Succeeded by: John Dawson

Member of the Virginia House of Delegates representing Southampton County
- In office October 17, 1791 – September 30, 1792 Serving with James Wilkinson
- Preceded by: Benjamin Blunt
- Succeeded by: Robert Goodwyn
- In office October 15, 1787 – October 17, 1790 Serving with James Wilkinson
- Preceded by: John Taylor
- Succeeded by: Benjamin Blunt

Personal details
- Born: Southampton County, Virginia Virginia Colony, British America
- Died: 1817
- Education: College of William & Mary
- Profession: Attorney, planter, politician

Edwin Gray (before 1765 – circa 1817) was a lawyer, planter, patriot and politician from Southampton County who represented the county in the Virginia House of Delegates before serving seven terms in the U.S. House of Representatives (1799-1813).

== Early life and education ==
Born in Southampton County, Virginia, the son of Edwin Gray (who served in House of Burgesses and in the Virginia Revolutionary Conventions, then both houses of the Virginia General Assembly) and his wife, the former Juliana Godwin of Nansemond County. His had three brothers (Joseph, Thomas and young Henry Mills Gray), and a sister Mary who married Daniel Simmonds. Gray received a private education suitable to his class before traveling across the James River to Williamsburg to attend the College of William & Mary. His uncle James Gray served as a captain during the Revolutionary War, was wounded at the Battle of Germantown and married Elizabeth Grizzie Cowper.

== Career ==
His grandfather Joseph Gray and father Edwin Gray Sr. been prominent in Southampton County for decades, as well as operated plantations using enslaved labor. This man also distilled brandy liquor, and in 1814 had a machine with five sections with capacities of 141, 149, 174 and 177 gallons. His brother Thomas at Round Hill plantation was known for his stables of racehorses (from 'Pegasus' certified in 1814 to 'Terpsichore' certified in 1823).

In 1787 Southampton County voters elected either this man or his father as well as James Wilkinson as their representatives to the Virginia House of Delegates. However, the two Southampton delegates for the fall 1790 session (in the year this man's father died) were Benjamin Blount (who had represented the county in the 1788 Ratification Convention) and veteran James Wilkinson. Voters again elected Edwin Gray (clearly not his late father) alongside James Wilkinson for the fall 1791 session, but not in the fall 1792 session. This man won election to Congress seven times before retiring in 1813 (with his congressional district number changing from the 19th to the 10th in the reapportionment following the 1800 census).

== Personal life ==
Gray married twice, first to a woman named Charlotte. In the 1810 census, his Southampton County household included an adult white men and woman (both between 26 and 44 years old) as well as two boys and a girl between 11 and 15 years old, and a white male between 16 and 25 years old, as well as ten enslaved people. He later married Margaret Kearns of Portsmouth, but one historian believes Gray died without having had any children, nor leaving any last will and testament that survives.

== Death and legacy ==
Gray retired from Congress in 1813. One genealogist believed he died in Portsmouth, Virginia, while another notes his presence in the Nansemond County personal property tax list in 1817 and no other year. His cousin John C. Gray served as a congressman in 1821-1823, but was not his direct successor despite some family histories. Complicating matters, two decades later, shortly before Nat Turner's Rebellion and its suppression, this man's brother Thomas Gray, who had two sons and a daughter, died with a last will and testament explicitly disinheriting his lawyer son Thomas Ruffin Gray in favor of his son (this man's nephew) Edwin Gray and sister/daughter Ann Gray.

U.S. House of Representatives
Preceded by Carter B. Harrison	Member of the U.S. House of Representatives from Virginia's 10th congressional district March 4, 1799 – March 4, 1803	Succeeded by John Dawson
Preceded by John Taliaferro	Member of the U.S. House of Representatives from Virginia's 19th congressional district March 4, 1803 – March 4, 1813	Succeeded by Peterson Goodwyn
