= The Confessions of Nat Turner =

1967 novel by William Styron

- Title page for The Confessions of Nat Turner (1967)
- Author: William Styron
- Language: English
- Series: 155550
- Publisher: Random House
- Publication date: 1967
- Publication place: United States
- Media type: Print (Hardback & Paperback)
- Pages: 480
- ISBN: 0-679-60101-5 (1st ed)
- OCLC: 30069097
- Dewey Decimal: 813/.54 20
- LC Class: PS3569.T9 C6 1994

The Confessions of Nat Turner is a 1968 Pulitzer Prize-winning novel by American writer William Styron. Presented as a first-person narrative by historical figure Nat Turner, the novel concerns Nat Turner's Rebellion in Virginia in 1831 but does not always depict the events accurately. It is based on The Confessions of Nat Turner: The Leader of the Late Insurrection in Southampton, Virginia, a first-hand account of Turner's confessions published by a local lawyer and slavery apologist, Thomas R. Gray, in 1831.

In 2005, Time magazine included the novel in its List of the 100 Best Novels.

== Historical background ==
The novel is based on an extant document, the "confession" of Turner to the white lawyer Thomas R. Gray. In the historical confessions, Turner claims to have been divinely inspired, charged with a mission from God to lead a slave uprising and destroy the white race. He claimed to receive messages, and these messages told him to follow through with his rebellion killing white families with their weapons.

Styron's novel attempts to imagine the character of Nat Turner; it does not purport to describe accurately or authoritatively the events as they occurred. Some historians consider Gray's account of Turner's "confessions" to be told with prejudice, and recently one writer has alleged that Gray's account is itself a fabrication. Some scholars believe that mental illness may have driven Nat Turner's actions, while others believed Turner to have been moved by religiosity.

== Plot summary ==
The time is November 1831. An enslaved African, Nat Turner sits in a Virginia jail awaiting execution for his crimes. Nat led a rebellion which ended in the deaths of dozens of white people as well as many of his own closest friends. Thomas Gray, a prosecuting attorney, urges Nat to "confess" his crimes and make peace with God. Nat begins to think back on his past life and tells the novel in a series of flashbacks.

Nat's first master was Samuel Turner, a wealthy Virginia aristocrat who believed in educating his slaves. Nat learned to read and write and also became a skilled carpenter. Unfortunately, when he was still a child Nat's mother was brutally raped by an Irish overseer while the master was away. This traumatic experience gives Nat both a burning hatred of white people and a secret revulsion towards women's bodies and sex.

Samuel Turner has vaguely promised Nat his freedom, but through a series of misunderstandings Nat is sold instead to an impoverished preacher named Reverend Eppes. Eppes is a filthy, drooling homosexual who is obsessed with young boys, and he is determined to make Nat "pleasure" him at the earliest opportunity. Though Nat is not especially interested in young women at this point, he finds Eppes physically distasteful and shies away from physical contact. Discouraged, Eppes soon sells young Nat to a pair of cruel redneck farmers who brutally whip the frightened, timid slave and treat him like an animal. This intensifies his growing hostility towards whites.

After bouncing around different masters for several years, Nat finally ends up as the property of a decent, hard-working farmer named Travis. Travis allows Nat to do skilled work as a carpenter, read his Bible, and preach to other slaves. During his religious fasts deep in the deserted woods, Nat begins to have strange visions of black and white angels fighting in the sky. Gradually he comes to believe these visions mean he is to lead the black race in a holy war to destroy all whites.

Complications arise, however, when Nat meets Margaret Whitehead, the beautiful, vivacious daughter of a wealthy widow who lives nearby. Though her family owns many slaves, high-spirited Margaret opposes slavery and openly admires Nat's preaching. Gradually the two of them become friends, though Nat is haunted by the fear that if his plans succeed lovely Margaret must die.

With several loyal slaves behind him, Nat finally launched his rebellion in late August 1831. This is a time when most wealthy whites are away on vacation, which will make it easier for the slaves to seize weapons and attack the nearby town of Jerusalem. From the very beginning, however, Nat's rebellion goes all wrong. His recruits get drunk and waste precious time plundering and raping. A crazed, axe-wielding, sex-obsessed slave named Will begins ridiculing Nat's leadership and attempting to seize control of the tiny slave army. Nat himself, unexpectedly sickened by the sight of blood and the screams of his white victims, begins to doubt both his mission and God's plan for his life.

The final crisis occurs as the slaves storm the Whitehead plantation. In a tragic twist, Margaret and her sisters have not gone away on vacation after all. Filled with unreasoning hatred, Will the axe-wielding maniac slays all the white women but Margaret, openly taunting Nat and daring him to prove his black manhood to the rest of the recruits. With a heavy heart, Nat grabs his sword and chases Margaret into a nearby field, where he slays her with great reluctance. As the breath leaves her body, the pure young maiden sighs her forgiveness for her unwilling executioner.

Back in the jail cell, lawyer Gray smugly announces that the hangman is ready to punish Nat for his crimes. As he concludes their final interview, he asks the failed black leader if he has any regrets for having caused so much suffering and death.

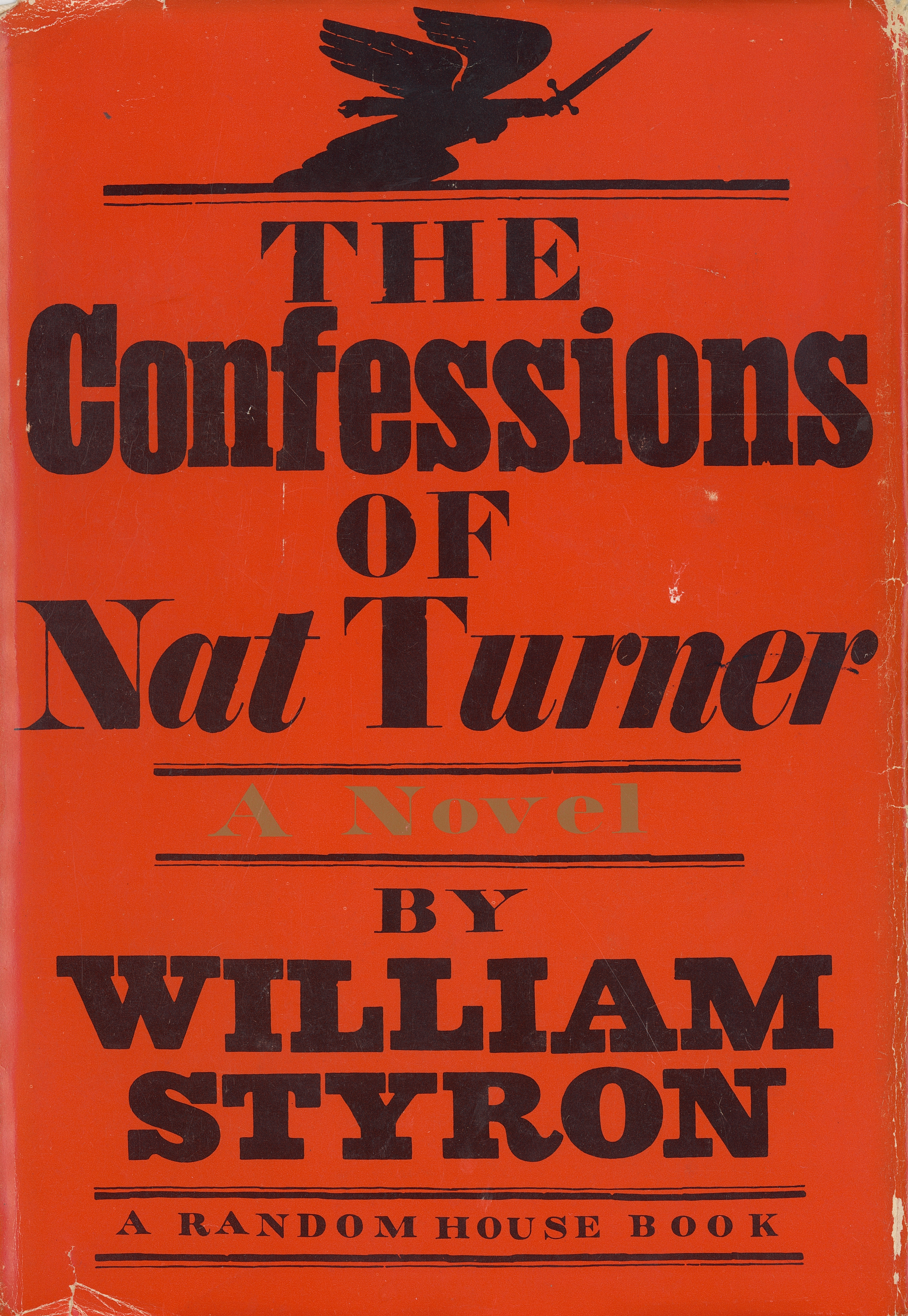
First Edition dust jacket

== Literary significance and criticism ==
Despite defenses by notable African-American authors Ralph Ellison and James Baldwin, the novel was strongly criticized by many African Americans. Styron's portrayal of the legendary black resistance leader was considered unfair. Turner was hardly a reluctant warrior. He showed considerable military acumen despite his lack of formal training, yet the book did not cleanly focus on this element of his character. This generated resentment. Offensive also to many black readers was a flattering portrayal of the novel's slaveowners, such as "saintly" Samuel Turner; the character of Margaret Whitehead raised particular criticism. Historical evidence of a flirtatious relationship between her and Turner has yet to be unearthed.

Issues of class divided readers as well. The white slaveowners in the novel, especially the wealthy ones, are represented as generous, courteous, and decent, but poor whites are held up to ridicule as simpletons and deviants. Turner and his supporters (particularly Will, who many readers saw as a thinly disguised version of black rock and roll pioneer Little Richard) are caricatured as disturbed, monstrous figures. Nat and his rival Will are both continually shown fantasizing about sexually assaulting white women. Historically, however, though opportunities to actually commit such acts would naturally have presented themselves, no such thing is known to have ever taken place, evidence of a human decency on Nat Turner's part and discipline of a proper military sort on the part of his comrades. Critics took issue with Styron using the "myth of the black rapist", as portraying black men as prone to sexual violence against white women. Suspected sexual assault was a longstanding racist stereotype used as rhetorical justification for lynching black men.

To address these concerns, ten black intellectuals wrote essays criticizing the work, collected in William Styron's Nat Turner: Ten Black Writers Respond (1968). Elsewhere, historian Eugene D. Genovese defended Styron's right to imagine Turner as a fictional character.

In 1968, despite protests against the novel, Styron's work won critical acclaim and the Pulitzer Prize for Fiction.

The 1969 novel Slaughterhouse-Five by Kurt Vonnegut has Billy Pilgrim in a Manhattan radio studio amongst a group of literary critics there "to discuss whether the novel was dead or not." "One of them said that it would be a fine time to bury the novel now that a Virginian, one hundred years after Appomattox, had written Uncle Tom's Cabin" – a reference to Styron's novel.

The 1971 Italian Mondo docudrama Goodbye Uncle Tom has a section featuring the book The Confessions of Nat Turner and Nat Turner's slave rebellion.

Bill Clinton has cited the novel as one of his favorite books.
