= James Trezvant =

American politician

Member of the U.S. House of Representatives from Virginia's 2nd district
- In office March 4, 1825 – March 3, 1831
- Preceded by: Arthur Smith
- Succeeded by: John Y. Mason

Chairman of the Committee on Military Pensions
- In office March 4, 1829 – March 3, 1831
- Preceded by: James Coffield Mitchell
- Succeeded by: Position abolished

Member of the Virginia Senate from Dinwiddie, Southampton and Sussex Counties
- In office 1808–1811
- Preceded by: John Pegram
- Succeeded by: Joseph Goodwyn

Member of the Virginia House of Delegates from Southampton County
- In office 1807; Alongside Edward Bailey

Personal details
- Born: Unknown Sussex County, Virginia
- Died: September 2, 1841 Southampton County, Virginia, U.S.
- Party: Jacksonian (after 1829)
- Other political affiliations: Democratic-Republican (before 1829)
- Occupation: lawyer

James Trezvant (died September 2, 1841) was a U.S. representative from Virginia. He was also a slave owner.

== Biography ==
Born in Sussex County, Virginia, Trezvant studied law after college. He was admitted to the bar and began practicing law in Jerusalem, Virginia, eventually rising to position of attorney general in the state. In 1820, Trezvant served as delegate to the State constitutional convention. He subsequently was elected to and served in the State house of delegates.

He was elected to the Nineteenth and Twentieth Congresses and as a Jacksonian to the Twenty-first Congress (March 4, 1825 – March 3, 1831). He served as chairman of the Committee on Military Pensions during the Twenty-first Congress.

Trezvant served in the Virginia Constitutional Convention of 1829-1830 from Southampton County; his district included Sussex, Surry, Isle of Wight, Prince George, and Greensville counties. He served on the Committee of the Executive Department.

He was one of the judges in Southampton County in the trials of the people involved in the Nat Turner's Rebellion.

Trezvant died in Southampton County, Virginia on September 2, 1841.

== Electoral history ==
- 1825; Trezvant was elected to the U.S. House of Representatives unopposed.
- 1827; Trezvant was re-elected unopposed.
- 1829; Trezvant was re-elected unopposed.

== Bibliography ==
- Pulliam, David Loyd (1901). The Constitutional Conventions of Virginia from the foundation of the Commonwealth to the present time. John T. West, Richmond. ISBN 978-1-2879-2059-5.
- United States Congress. "James Trezvant (id: T000365)". Biographical Directory of the United States Congress.

U.S. House of Representatives
Preceded by Arthur Smith	Member of the U.S. House of Representatives from Virginia's 2nd congressional district 1825–1831	Succeeded by John Y. Mason
Political offices
Preceded by James Coffield Mitchell; Tennessee	Chairman of House Military Pensions Committee; 1829–1831	Succeeded by Position abolished
