= National Register of Historic Places listings in Sussex County, Virginia =

Location of Sussex County in Virginia

This is a list of the National Register of Historic Places listings in Sussex County, Virginia.

This is intended to be a complete list of the properties and districts on the National Register of Historic Places in Sussex County, Virginia, United States. The locations of National Register properties and districts for which the latitude and longitude coordinates are included below, may be seen in an online map.

There are 10 properties and districts listed on the National Register in the county.

This National Park Service list is complete through NPS recent listings posted May 1, 2026.

== Current listings ==
	Name on the Register	Image	Date listed	Location	City or town	Description
1	Miles B. Carpenter House	Miles B. Carpenter House	November 13, 1989 (#89001920)	U.S. Route 460; 37°02′17″N 77°05′38″W	Waverly	
2	Chester	Chester	December 18, 1970 (#70000829)	North of the junction of State Route 35 and Newville Rd. 36°58′19″N 77°10′46″W	Homeville	
3	Purnell Fleetwood House	Purnell Fleetwood House	February 25, 2020 (#100005007)	202 E. Main St. 37°02′16″N 77°05′30″W	Waverly	
4	Fortsville	Fortsville	September 15, 1970 (#70000828)	Southeast of the junction of Grizzard and Fortsville Rds. 36°42′49″N 77°25′08″W	Grizzard	Straddles the border with Southampton County
5	Glenview	Glenview	November 26, 2008 (#08001114)	13098 Comans Well Rd. 36°52′15″N 77°24′19″W	Stony Creek	
6	Hunting Quarter	Hunting Quarter	April 7, 1995 (#95000396)	Hunting Quarter Rd., south of its junction with Poole Rd. 36°52′08″N 77°13′26″W	Waverly	
7	Little Town	Little Town	November 18, 1976 (#76002124)	West of Littleton on Cool Spring Rd. 36°54′25″N 77°10′17″W	Littleton	
8	Nottoway Archeological Site (44SX6, 44SX7, 44SX98, 44SX162)	Nottoway Archeological Site (44SX6, 44SX7, 44SX98, 44SX162)	November 3, 1988 (#88002181)	Address Restricted	Stony Creek	
9	Sussex County Courthouse Historic District	Sussex County Courthouse Historic District	July 24, 1973 (#73002066)	Junction of Courthouse and Old Forty Rds. 36°54′55″N 77°16′47″W	Sussex	
10	Waverly Downtown Historic District	Waverly Downtown Historic District	May 28, 2013 (#13000344)	Generally surrounding W. Main St. from County Dr. west to Coppahaunk Ave. 37°02′09″N 77°05′44″W	Waverly	Forty-eight contributing buildings, one contributing site, and two contributing structures.

== See also ==
- List of National Historic Landmarks in Virginia
- National Register of Historic Places listings in Virginia
