= Dabney Cosby =

American architect

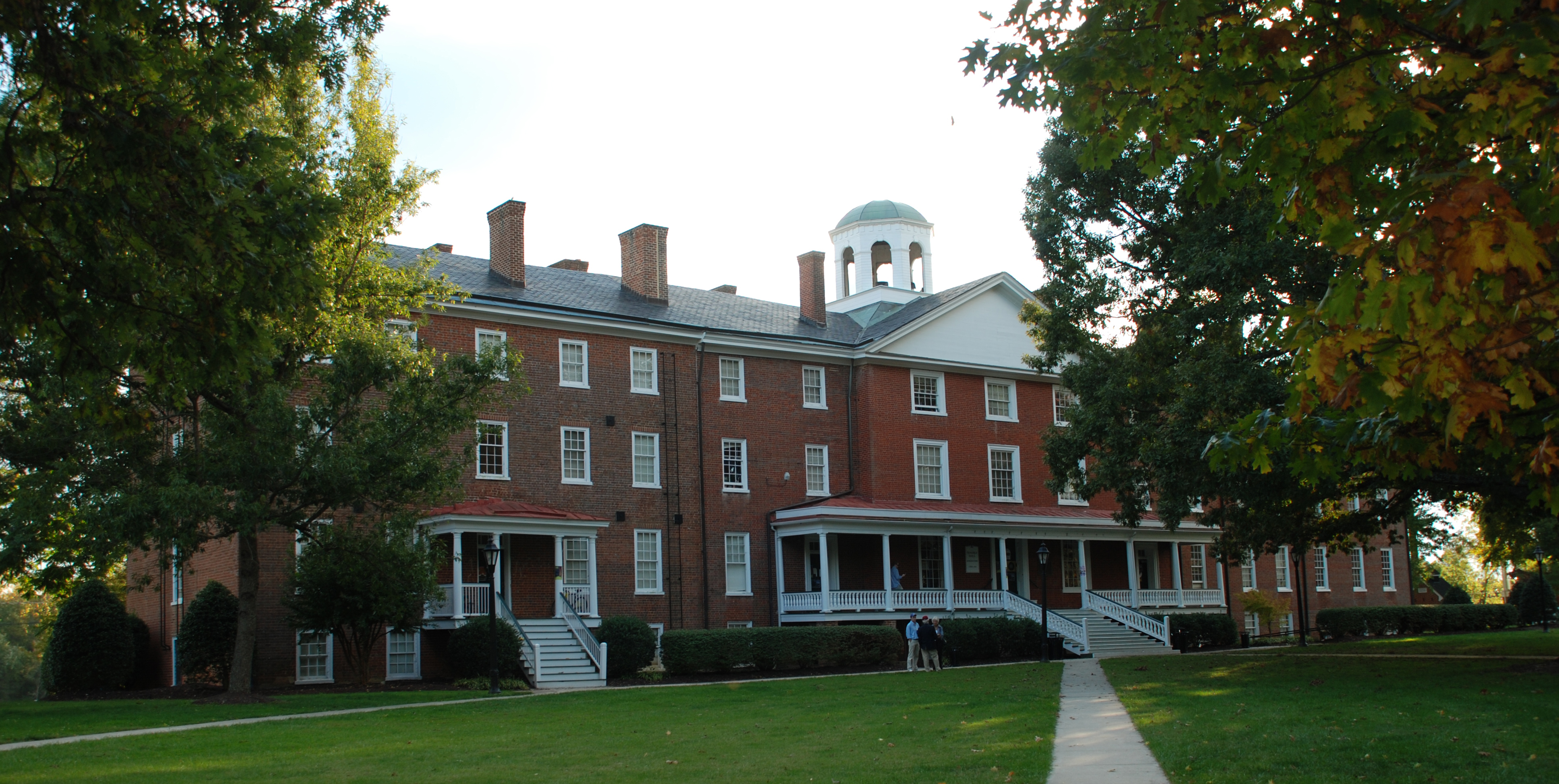
Venable Hall at Hampden–Sydney College, designed by Cosby (1824–1830)

Dabney Cosby (11 August 1779 – 8 July 1862) was an American architect, slaveowner, and builder active primarily in Virginia and North Carolina. His earliest known work dates to the 1820s; he is known to have been active until the time of his death.

== Biography ==
Cosby is said to have worked with Thomas Jefferson on the construction of some of the original buildings of the University of Virginia early in his career, but the precise nature of their collaboration remains unknown. His earliest documented work is the courthouse of Sussex County, Virginia, dated to 1825. Cosby was well known around southern Virginia and North Carolina, and worked in many styles throughout his career. In 1840 he purchased a lot in Raleigh, North Carolina, living in that town until his death; his letters indicate that he travelled greatly during this time.

Most of Cosby's surviving buildings are in Virginia. These include Cumberland County Courthouse in Cumberland, Virginia; Grace Church in the former community of Ca Ira; Halifax County Courthouse in Halifax, Virginia, Venable Hall, on the campus of Hampden–Sydney College; the Sussex County Courthouse in Sussex, and the Goochland County Courthouse complex in Goochland, all of which are listed on the National Register of Historic Places, as well as Hotel A, one of the buildings designed by Jefferson that comprise the core of the University of Virginia, which has long housed the Virginia Quarterly Review.

In North Carolina he designed the Dr. Beverly Jones House near Bethania, Forsyth County, North Carolina.

Cosby died in 1862.
