= Littleton, Virginia =

- Unincorporated community
- Location within Virginia Location within the United States
- Coordinates: 36°54′10″N 77°08′57″W
- Country: United States
- State: Virginia
- County: Sussex
- Elevation: 102 ft (31 m)
- Time zone: UTC-5 (Eastern (EST))
  - Summer (DST): UTC-4 (EDT)
- Area code: 804
- GNIS feature ID: 1477494

Littleton is an unincorporated community in Sussex County, Virginia, United States. Littleton is located on Virginia State Route 35, 9.7 miles (15.6 km) south-southwest of Waverly.

Little Town was listed on the National Register of Historic Places in 1976.
