= John R. Chambliss Sr. =

American politician

John Randolph Chambliss Sr. (March 4, 1809 – April 3, 1875) was a Virginia lawyer, plantation owner, and politician who served in the Confederate House of Representatives during the American Civil War.

Because he also served in a county militia, he had to petition for amnesty after the war, as he had not acquired the pass confirming that he had taken the Oath of Allegiance.

== Biography ==
Chambliss was born in Sussex County, Virginia to a planter family, James Jared Chambliss (1784-1848) and Lucy Rives Newsom (1782 – 1858).

He grew up at his family home of Glenview, near Stony Creek, Virginia. It is also known as the Chambliss House.

He attended Winchester Law School in the Shenandoah Valley and passed the bar exam.

In 1830 he married Sarah Jane Rives Blow in Greensville County, Virginia and settled there. He established a profitable law practice near his home in Emporia. He and his wife had seven children but four did not survive childhood.

Chambliss had a moderate-sized plantation and produced profits from commodity crops.

He served as a delegate to the Virginia state constitutional convention in 1850–51. An ardent supporter of states rights, he was the delegate from Greensville and Sussex counties to the Virginia secession convention in 1861. He was subsequently elected to the First Confederate Congress.

Chambliss served in Captain Scott's Company, Greensville Local Defense. After the war, he was arrested and briefly jailed for not having an Oath of Allegiance pass. This was the loyalty oath required of former Confederates. A copy of his petition to President Andrew Johnson is filed at the National Archives; it was granted.

Chambliss retired from politics and returned to his home to take up the practice of law. He was interred in the Chambliss family graveyard near Emporia, Virginia.

== Legacy ==
Of the Chambliss's seven children, four did not survive past childhood. They and all the others, including the grown ones, were buried in the Chambliss family cemetery in Emporia.

Eldest son and namesake John R. Chambliss Jr. (1833-1864) served in the Civil War for the Confederate States Army, first in the cavalry. He was promoted to Brigadier General in 1862, in charge of the 41st Infantry. He died on the battlefield in 1864, and his men ultimately returned his body to the family for burial in the Chambliss cemetery.

== References and links ==
- Political Graveyard

Confederate States House of Representatives
Preceded by none	C.S.A. Representative from Virginia's 2nd Congressional District; 1862 – 1865	Succeeded by none
