= Homeville, Virginia =

- Unincorporated community
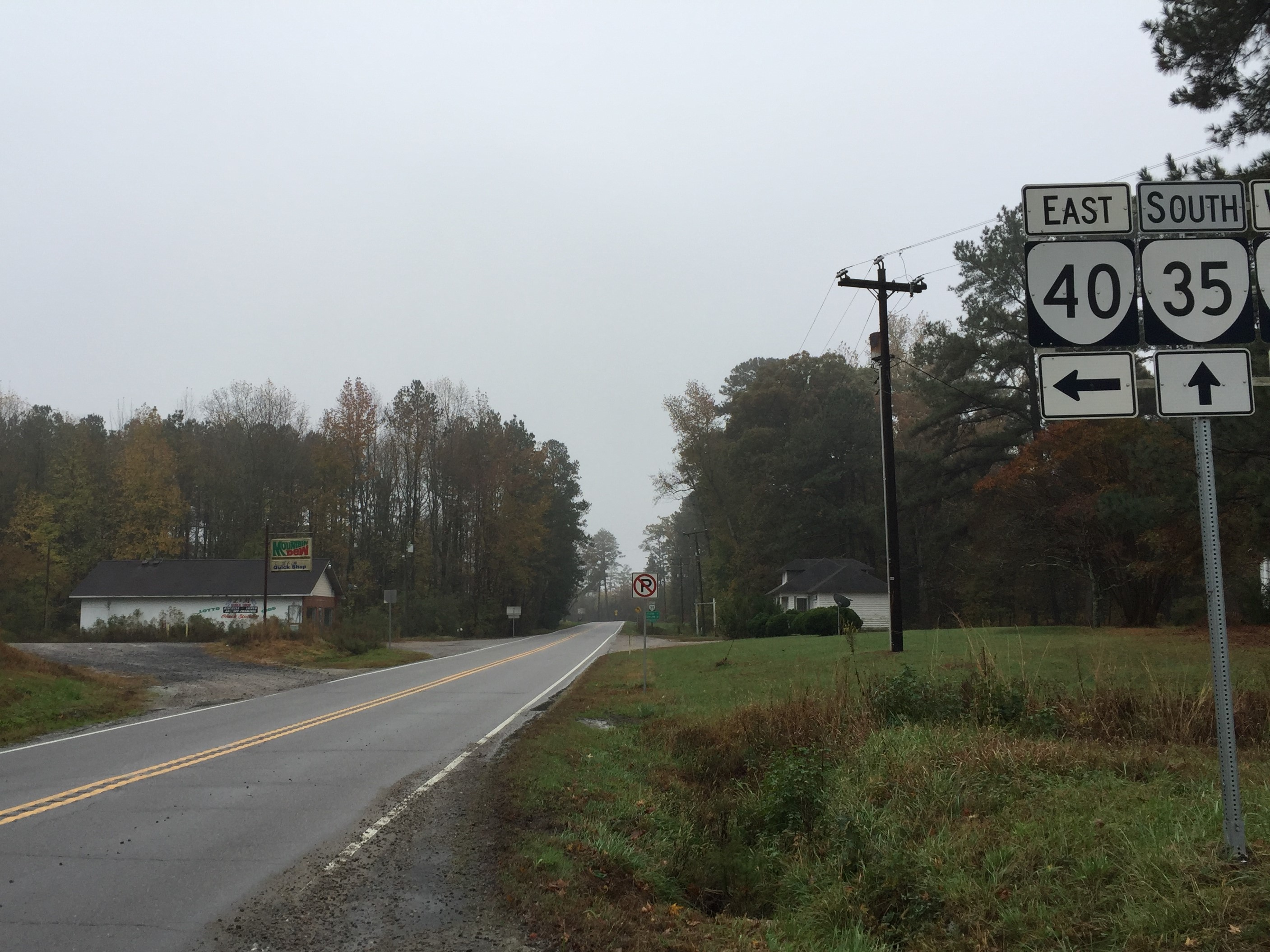
- Homeville, at the intersection of Routes 35 and 40

- Location within Virginia Location within the United States
- Coordinates: 36°56′56″N 77°10′17″W
- Country: United States
- State: Virginia
- County: Sussex
- Elevation: 112 ft (34 m)
- Time zone: UTC-5 (Eastern (EST))
  - Summer (DST): UTC-4 (EDT)
- Area code: 804
- GNIS feature ID: 1495711

Homeville is an unincorporated community in Sussex County, Virginia, United States. Homeville is located at the junction of Virginia State Route 35 and Virginia State Route 40, 7.3 miles (11.7 km) south-southwest of Waverly.

== Chester Plantation ==
Chester, purchased by Captain William Harrison (1747-1822) in 1787, and fought in the American Revolution is located near Homeville. Chester is noteworthy architecturally for its huge double chimneys joined on two levels by connecting closets. Its interior woodwork has also survived. Chester is listed on the National Register of Historic Places.
