= Miles B. Carpenter =

American sculptor (1889–1985)

- Born: Miles Burkholder Carpenter; May 12, 1889; Lancaster County, Pennsylvania, U.S.
- Died: May 7, 1985 (aged 95); Petersburg, Virginia, U.S.
- Resting place: Waverly Cemetery
- Occupations: Folk sculptor; businessman
- Spouse: Mary Elizabeth Stahl (m. 1915)
- Children: 1
- Parent(s): Wayne M. Carpenter; Elizabeth R. Burkholder Carpenter

Miles Burkholder Carpenter (May 12, 1889 – May 7, 1985) was an American folk sculptor.

Carpenter was a native of Lancaster County, Pennsylvania, and was the eighth of eleven children of farmer Wayne M. Carpenter and his wife, Elizabeth R. Burkholder Carpenter; he was the fourth of seven boys, and was born on Cedar Hill Farm near Brownstown. He attended a one-room school and worked on the family farm with his siblings. In the spring of 1902 the Carpenters moved to Virginia, where Wayne had acquired 340 acres near Waverly for farming; he would later build a sawmill as well. On May 19, 1915, Miles Carpenter married Mary Elizabeth Stahl, of Carbon County, Pennsylvania, with whom he had a son. Around 1912 Miles, with financial assistance from his father, purchased a vacant factory which he soon began to operate as a lumber mill, producing finished wood for local builders. He operated a sawmill and made and sold ice, and for several years with a partner ran an open-air theater for the showing of films. From time to time he would tinker with pieces of wood, and in 1941, during a slow period of business, began whittling. His wife was greatly pleased by his first carving, a polar bear, and she encouraged him to carve more animals; the post-war building boom left him little time for further carving, but in the mid-1950s he closed his mill, suffering from the aftereffects of a number of accidents which he had incurred while operating machinery.

Carpenter had resumed carving by the 1960s, when he began creating figures as a means of drawing attention to his roadside business. His wife died on November 5, 1966; he produced the majority of his work after that date. His carvings became more ambitious, including life-size figures of people and animals as well as "root monsters", which he created from the roots of trees that he had found. He set these sculptures in the back of his pickup truck, which he parked by his stand, and which he drove around Waverly. Of particular note was a sculpture of a woman called "Lena Wood", who sat in the passenger seat.

In creating his artwork Carpenter favored chisels, files, hatchets, pocketknives, and saws to manipulate the wood. Besides animal and human figures he produced works which commented on current events; he also depicted such celebrities as Elvis Presley and Charlie Chaplin. His work was discovered by students from Virginia Commonwealth University in 1972, and he began to receive attention from collectors of folk art, among them Herbert Waide Hemphill, Jr. He held one-man shows at Virginia Commonwealth University in 1974 and 1985 and in 1980 at the Yorktown Visitors Center; centennial retrospectives followed, at the Hand Workshop Art Center, in Richmond, and Radford University in 1989 and 1990, respectively. The artist was invited to the White House in 1981, and in 1982 published an autobiography, Cutting the Mustard. That same year the National Endowment for the Arts offered him a fellowship. Carpenter died in a hospital in Petersburg, Virginia and was buried in Waverly Cemetery. His home became the Miles B. Carpenter Museum, which was established in 1986; the museum complex also contains the First Peanut Museum. It displays the largest collection of Carpenter's work anywhere in the world, as well as his tools and other items related to his career.

Seven sculptures by Carpenter are owned by the Smithsonian American Art Museum. Three works are in the collection of the American Folk Art Museum. Four pieces are held by the Milwaukee Art Museum. Three sculptures, including the original carved watermelon he had made as a trade sign, are in the collection of the Abby Aldrich Rockefeller Folk Art Museum.
