= Senator Goodwin (disambiguation) =

Carte Goodwin (born 1974) was a U.S. Senator from West Virginia in 2010. Senator Goodwin or Goodwyn may also refer to:

- Albert Taylor Goodwyn (1842–1931), Alabama State Senate
- Alexander T. Goodwin (1837–1899), New York State Senate
- Angier Goodwin (1881–1975), Massachusetts State Senate
- Edward E. Goodwyn (1874–1961), Virginia State Senate
- Greta Goodwin (1936–2010), Kansas State Senate
- John Noble Goodwin (1824–1887), Maine State Senate
- Maryellen Goodwin (1964–2023), Rhode Island State Senate
- Norman Goodwin (1913–2010), Iowa State Senate
- Regina Goodwin (born 1962), Oklahoma State Senate
- Tim Goodwin (Iowa politician) (fl. 2020s), Iowa State Senate
- Tom Goodwin (New Jersey politician) (born 1951), New Jersey State Senate
- William S. Goodwin (1866–1937), Arkansas State Senate

== See also ==
- Senator Godwin (disambiguation)
