= Virginia State Route 35 =

State highway in southeastern Virginia, US

State Route 35

Route information
- Maintained by VDOT
- Length: 48.71 mi (78.39 km)
- Existed: 1923–present

Major junctions
- South end: NC 35 near Boykins
- SR 186 in Boykins; US 58 near Courtland; SR 40 in Homeville; US 301 / SR 156 in Templeton; I-95 in Templeton
- North end: SR 605 / SR 622 in Templeton

Location
- Country: United States
- State: Virginia
- Counties: Southampton, Sussex, Prince George

Highway system
- Virginia Routes; Interstate; US; Primary; Secondary; Byways; History; HOT lanes
← SR 34	→ SR 36

State Route 35 (SR 35) is a primary state highway in the U.S. state of Virginia. The state highway runs 48.71 miles (78.39 km) from the North Carolina state line near Boykins, where the highway continues as North Carolina Highway 35 (NC 35), north to SR 605 and SR 622 in Templeton. SR 35 is the main north–south highway of Southampton County; the highway also connects U.S. Route 58 (US 58) in Courtland with Interstate 95 (I-95) and US 301 at Templeton south of Petersburg.

== Route description ==
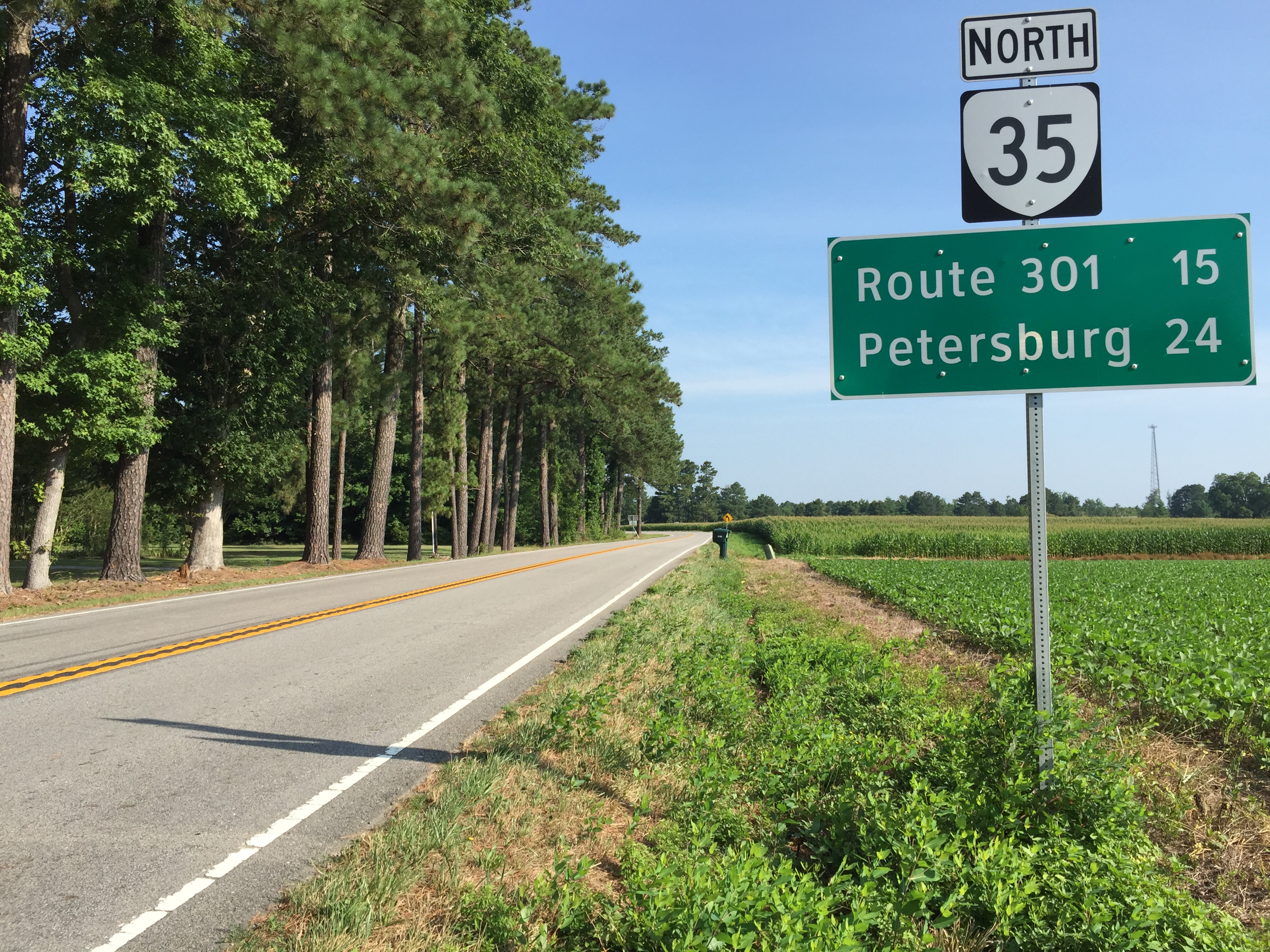
View north along SR 35 at SR 40 in Homeville

SR 35 begins at the North Carolina state line south of Boykins. The highway continues south as NC 35, which crosses the Meherrin River a short distance to the south. SR 35 heads north as Meherrin Road, which parallels the North Carolina and Virginia Railroad to the town of Boykins. The state highway follows Main Street through town and meets the eastern end of SR 186 (Beaton Avenue). SR 35 intersects CSX's Portsmouth Subdivision and continues northeast as Meherrin Road. Next to Southampton High School, the state highway meets US 58 (Southampton Parkway) at a diamond interchange. SR 35 runs concurrently with US 58 Business northeast on a through truss bridge over the Nottoway River into the town of Courtland. In the center of the county seat, US 58 Business turns south onto Main Street and SR 35 heads north and meets Norfolk Southern Railway's Franklin District at grade.

SR 35 heads northwest from Courtland as Plank Road. The state highway crosses over then parallels the Assamoosick Swamp north into Sussex County. Within that county, SR 35 is named Jerusalem Plank Road (see Battle of Jerusalem Plank Road) and intersects SR 40 (Sussex Drive) in the hamlet of Homeville. The state highway continues into Prince George County as Courtland Road to the village of Templeton. SR 35 meets US 301 (Crater Road) just east of I-95; the intersection also serves as the southern terminus of SR 156 (Prince George Drive) and receives the exit ramp from northbound I-95. SR 35 and US 301 head west across I-95 and meet the other three ramps of the partial cloverleaf interchange with the Interstate. US 301 turns south onto Crater Road while the state highway continues to its terminus at the intersection of SR 605 (Spain Drive) and SR 622 (Providence Road).

== Major intersections ==
County	Location	mi	km	Destinations	Notes
Southampton		0.00	0.00	NC 35 south – Conway	North Carolina state line; southern terminus
Southampton	Boykins	2.64	4.25	SR 186 west (Beaton Avenue) – Branchville	Eastern terminus of SR 186
Southampton		8.76	14.10	SR 673 (Grays Shop Road) – Newsoms	Former SR 194 south
Southampton		13.21	21.26	US 58 – Emporia, Franklin	Southern end of US 58 Bus. concurrency; interchange
Southampton	Courtland	15.38	24.75	US 58 Bus. east (Main Street) – Franklin, Virginia Beach, Chesapeake Bay Bridge-Tunnel	Northern end of US 58 Bus. concurrency
Southampton		16.07	25.86	SR 616 (Ivor Road) – Ivor	Former SR 312 north
Sussex	Homeville	33.67	54.19	SR 40 (Sussex Drive) – Stony Creek, Waverly	
Sussex	Lambs	43.94	70.71	SR 626 (Courthouse Road) – Sussex, Yale, Southampton Correctional Center	Former SR 351 south
Prince George	Templeton	47.99	77.23	US 301 north (Prince George Drive) to SR 156	Southern end of US 301 concurrency
Prince George	Templeton	47.99	77.23	I-95 – Emporia, Petersburg	Exit 41 (I-95)
Prince George	Templeton	48.26	77.67	US 301 south (South Crater Road)	Northern end of US 301 concurrency
Prince George		48.71	78.39	SR 605 (Spain Drive) / SR 622 (Providence Road)	Northern terminus
1.000 mi = 1.609 km; 1.000 km = 0.621 mi: Concurrency terminus

< SR 34	Two‑digit State Routes; 1923-1933	SR 36 >
