= Men's college =

Undergraduate colleges for males

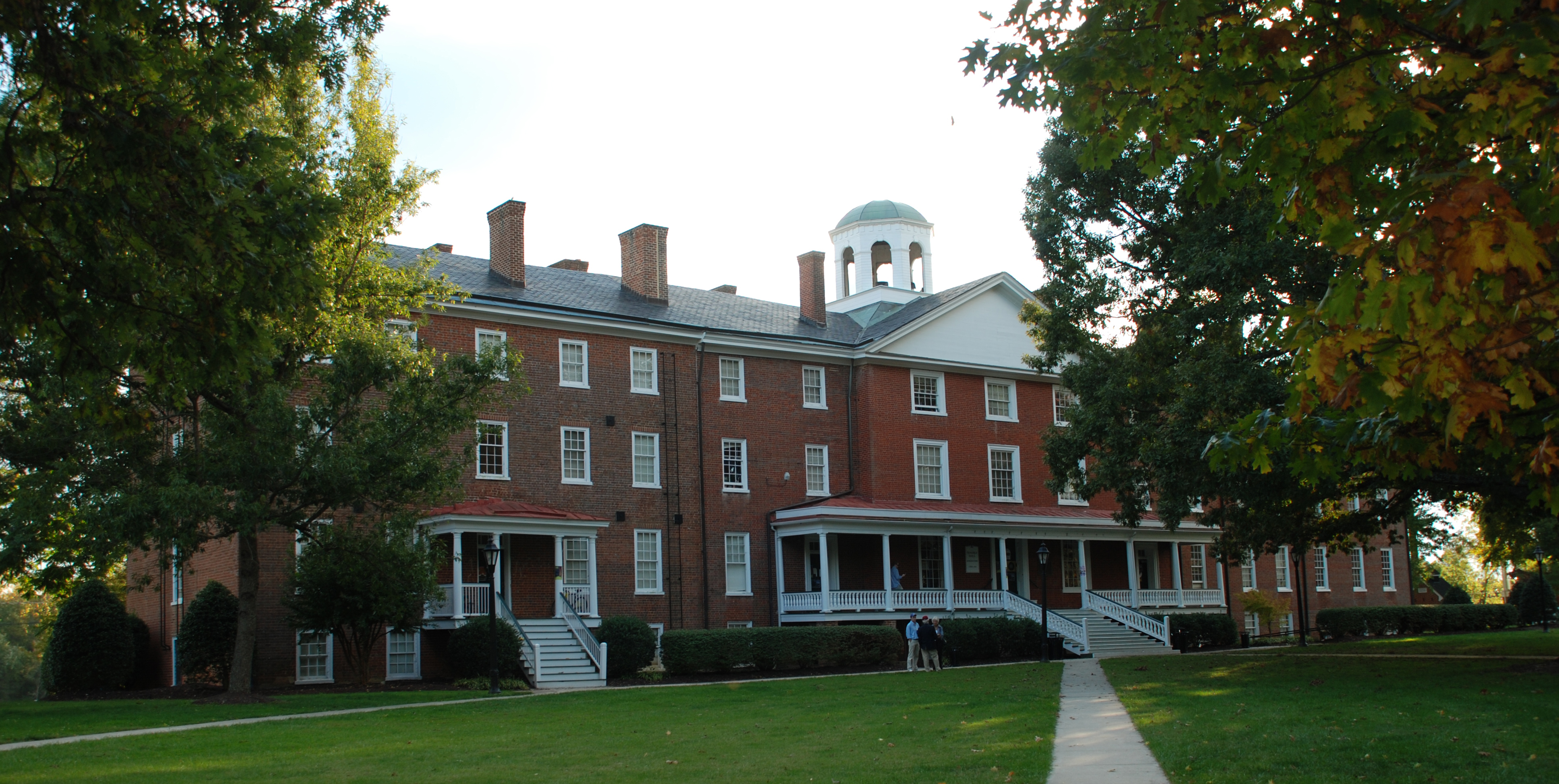
Venable Hall at all-male Hampden–Sydney College in Hampden Sydney, Virginia, United States

In higher education, a men's college is an undergraduate, bachelor's degree-granting institution whose students are exclusively men. Many are liberal arts colleges.

== Around the world ==
=== In North America ===
==== United States ====
In the United States, co-education did not become prevalent until 1900. Prior to that, the majority of private colleges and universities were sex-segregated. There are few remaining men's colleges in the U.S. today. Many of these are religious, vocational institutions.

==== Notable cases ====
United States v. Virginia, 518 U.S. 515 (1996)

== See also ==
- Women's college
- Mixed-sex education
- Single-sex education
