= Chester (Homeville, Virginia) =

Historic house in Virginia, United States

- U.S. National Register of Historic Places
- Virginia Landmarks Register
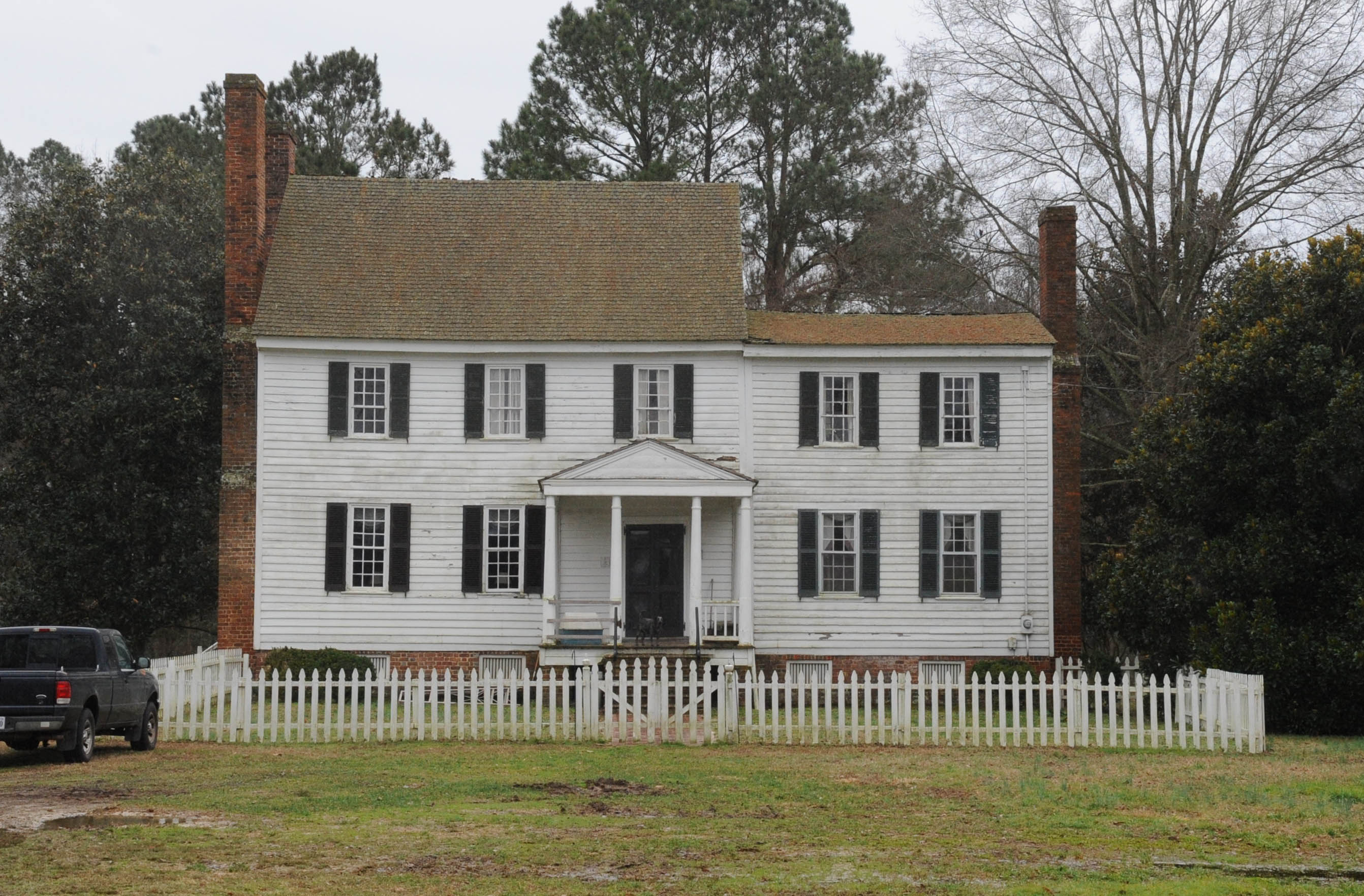

- Location within Virginia Location within the United States
- Location: Newville Road north of State Route 35, near Homeville, Virginia
- Coordinates: 36°58′19″N 77°10′47″W
- Area: 3 acres (1.2 ha)
- Built: 1773
- NRHP reference No.: 70000829
- VLR No.: 091-0021

Significant dates
- Added to NRHP: December 18, 1970
- Designated VLR: October 6, 1970

Chester is a historic home located near Homeville, Sussex County, Virginia. It was built in 1773, and is a two-story, three-bay, frame dwelling with side gable roof. It features two exterior chimney stacks, joined on both the first and second floor levels by pent closets. Attached to the main section is a two-story wing with an exterior chimney and a shallow gable roof added in the 1820s.

It was listed on the National Register of Historic Places in 1970.
