= Senator Godwin =

Senator Godwin may refer to:

- Hannibal Lafayette Godwin (1873–1929), North Carolina State Senate
- Mills Godwin (1914–1999), Virginia State Senate

== See also ==
- Senator Goodwin (disambiguation)
