= Glenview (Stony Creek, Virginia) =

Historic house in Virginia, United States

- U.S. National Register of Historic Places
- Virginia Landmarks Register
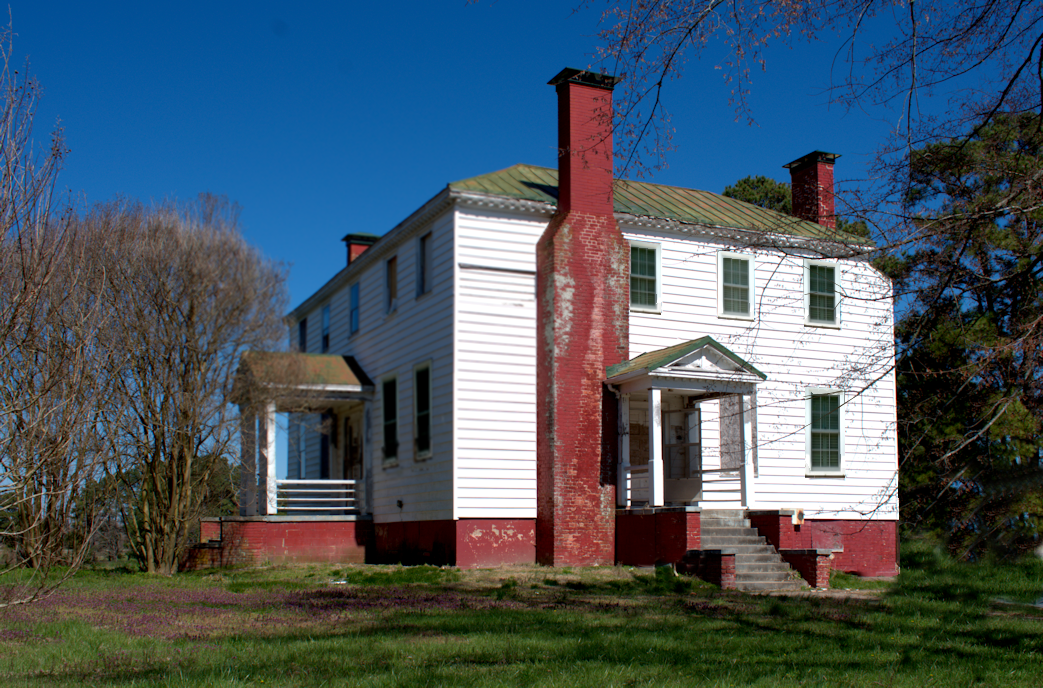

- Location within Virginia Location within the United States
- Location: 13098 Comans Well Rd., near Stony Creek, Virginia
- Coordinates: 36°52′32″N 77°24′22″W
- Area: 48 acres (19 ha)
- Built: c. 1800, 1820s
- Architectural style: Georgian, Federal
- NRHP reference No.: 08001114
- VLR No.: 091-0028

Significant dates
- Added to NRHP: November 26, 2008
- Designated VLR: September 18, 2008

Glenview, also known as Chambliss House, is a historic home located near Stony Creek, Sussex County, Virginia. The original section of the house was built about 1800. It was enlarged and modified in the 1820s.

It is associated with John R. Chambliss Sr. (1809-1875), who lived here during his lifetime. He was a planter and served in the Confederate House of Representatives after secession.

The house is a two-story, hip-roofed, five-bay dwelling. It has a Georgian central-hall plan with Federal style design influences. Also remaining on the property are a contributing early-19th century frame secondary structure that was likely used as a store and dwelling, and the Chambliss family burial ground.

It was listed on the National Register of Historic Places in 2008.
