= Elmon T. Gray =

American politician

Member of the Virginia Senate from the 16th district
- In office January 12, 1972 – January 11, 1992
- Preceded by: Garland Gray
- Succeeded by: Henry L. Marsh III

Personal details
- Born: May 1, 1925 Nansemond County, Virginia, U.S.
- Died: September 27, 2011 (aged 86) Richmond, Virginia, U.S.
- Party: Democratic
- Spouse: Pamela Spencer Gray
- Children: Katharine Taylor Gray, Garland Gray II, Bruce Burnside Gray
- Education: Virginia Military Institute

Military service
- Allegiance: United States
- Branch/service: United States Navy
- Years of service: 1944–1946
- Rank: Ensign
- Battles/wars: World War II

Elmon Taylor Gray (May 1, 1925 – September 27, 2011) was an American lumberman, real estate developer, philanthropist and Democratic member of the Senate of Virginia from Waverly, Virginia.

== Early and family life ==
Elmon Gray was born on May 1, 1925, to Garland (Peck) Gray and his wife Agnes Elizabeth (Aggie) Taylor. He attended segregated public schools, graduating from Waverly High School on the day of the Battle of Midway, and began studies at the Virginia Military Institute in 1942. He left VMI in 1944 to join the U.S. Navy as an ensign, and served on a minesweeper in the South Pacific until his discharge in 1946. He then returned to VMI and received his bachelor's degree in 1948. In 1990, he received an honorary degree from his alma mater.

He married Pamela Spencer Burnside, and they had two sons (Bruce Burnside Gray and Garland Gray II) and a daughter (Kathryn Taylor Gray).

== Career ==
Upon returning from World War II and graduating from VMI, Gray joined his father in the family lumber business, Gray Lumber Company, based in Waverly. He became its president in 1953, and in the following decades expanded its operations into real estate development in the Richmond suburbs. In 1992, as he retired from his part-time position in the Virginia Senate as described below, Gray Land & Timber Company sold substantial portions of the remaining timberland, and exchanged them for apartment rental properties, becoming GrayCo (which Elmon Gray headed until his death). He was also active with the Virginia Forestry Association (president 1969–71), the Reforestation Advisory Committee (1971) and the Ruritans. Gray also served on several board of directors, including on the Bank of Waverly, James River Bankshares, First and Merchants National Bank, Virginia Electric and Power Company (VEPCO), and Universal Leaf Tobacco Company.

Gray also invested in his passion, thoroughbred horseracing. Although Virginia approved pari-mutual racing in 1988, he and his consortium of investors were unable to secure regulatory approvals for a horse track in Hampton Roads.

Active in philanthropic causes, Gray especially favored those with educational missions. He served on the VMI Board of Visitors from 1956 (and as President from 1964–66), as well as with the Sussex County School Board (1963–72), John Tyler Community College (1965–72), the University of Richmond (Board of Trustees 1969–73) and Elon University (Board of Trustees 1990–1999). He also served on the vestry of his local Episcopal Church (having been converted from his grandmother's Congregational Church to Christ Episcopal Church Waverly by his wife) and was a Mason. Gray also helped raise money for the Boy Scouts of America, Virginia Historical Society, Appomattox Regional Governor's School for the Arts and Technology, Stuart Hall, the National D-Day Memorial at Bedford and the Southeast 4-H Center in Wakefield.

In 1971, his father decided to retire from his part-time Senatorial seat, as his longtime Southside district underwent a major reorganization after the 1970 census and a federal court order consolidating Norfolk and Virginia Beach senatorial districts into one three-member district in 1971. Elmon Gray succeeded to much of his father's 6th Senatorial District, now renumbered the 16th Senatorial District, and encompassing Price George, Surry, Sussex Counties and the cities of Colonial Heights, Hopewell and Petersburg. Re-elected four times, Gray served five four-year terms.

In the Senate, Gray led efforts to improve higher education, and also thwarted efforts to curb abortion rights. He also led efforts to establish Martin Luther King Jr.'s birthday as a state holiday, and protected the Southside economy, including truckers and gasoline retailers. Gray advocated a bridge across the James River to replace the Jamestown Ferry to aid economic development in Surry but the bridge was vehemently opposed by residents of a nearby upscale waterfront residential community as well as historic preservationists who were concerned that the proposed span would adversely affect the historical, environmental and visual characteristics of the Jamestown area. The plan was ultimately defeated when the Commonwealth Transportation Board unanimously killed plans for the span.

Gray announced his retirement from the Senate upon receiving a prostate cancer diagnosis, and expecting major redistricting following the 1990 census (which also affected his friend and fellow Senator Howard P. Anderson of Halifax). Shortly before retiring from the Senate, Gray helped persuade Sussex officials to consider allowing a large regional landfill to open in the county as a revenue-raising opportunity. Gray then sold 700 acres of his timberland at $4,415 an acre, for a total of $3.1 million for the site of the landfill, which drew the ire of many of his constituents who didn't want this massive garbage dump in their backyard. At a public hearing in 1991 on the proposed landfill, more than 700 people showed up at the Sussex County courthouse to oppose the landfill. Gray, the largest landowner in Sussex county, became increasingly unpopular in Waverly and Sussex due to his support of the mega-landfill. A local preacher stood in front of his congregation and referred to Gray as "the enemy" and landfill opponents compared him to Iraqi dictator Saddam Hussein at a protest against the garbage dump due to his determination to open the landfill over the stiff opposition of local residents, and the totalitarian control they believed he had wielded over local government for decades based on his wealth. The Gray family's sawmill, land and timber holdings were estimated to be worth approximately $100 million in 1992.

Even in political retirement, Gray continued to lobby for a Jamestown-Surry bridge, for new economic development in Sussex, and to keep women out of his alma mater, Virginia Military Institute. "I never thought that any self-respecting girl would want to go there", he said of VMI and the lawsuit that would have required the all-male, state-sponsored military school to admit women. "Thank God the first phase went in our favor, but this thing is a long way from over", Gray said in 1991, referring to the possibility of appeals of the court's decision against allowing women into the school. The lawsuit was ultimately appealed all the way to the US Supreme Court which ruled against VMI. After defying the Supreme Court order for three months, VMI's governing board ultimately voted 9 to 8 to admit women in 1996, transforming the nation's last single-sex state-supported school into a co-ed institution.

After leaving the Senate, Gray moved from Waverly to a home overlooking the James River at Jordan Point in Prince George, and in his later years lived on Monument Avenue in Richmond. Gray survived his cancer diagnosis by two decades, his friend Sen. Anderson by more than a decade, and his beloved wife by nearly a year.

== Death and memorials ==
He died on September 27, 2011, about two and a half years after receiving VMI's Harry F. Byrd Jr. Public service award in March 2009. His funeral was conducted by Rev. David Anderson, son of his late friend Sen. Howard Anderson. VMI has his papers, awards a scholarship in his name, and named its athletic stadium jointly after Gray and fellow alumnus Minor. At the time of his death he was a parishioner of Merchant's Hope Episcopal Church in Prince George.

Senate of Virginia
| Preceded by Garland Gray | Virginia Senate, District 16; 1971–1991 | Succeeded by Henry L. Marsh III |
