= Little Town (Littleton, Virginia) =

Historic house in Virginia, United States

- U.S. National Register of Historic Places
- Virginia Landmarks Register
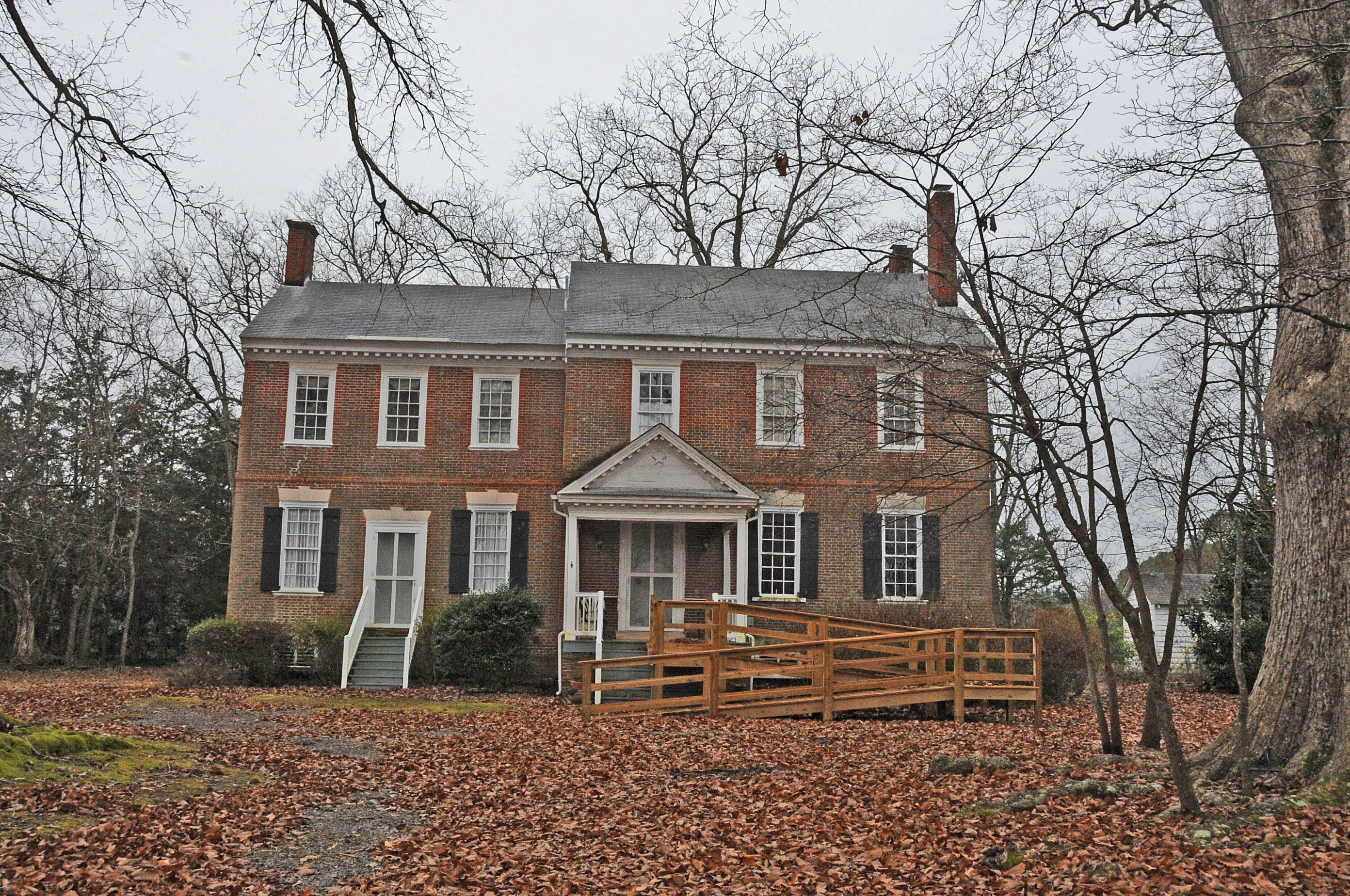

- Location within Virginia Location within the United States
- Location: West of Littleton, Virginia, on Cool Spring Road
- Coordinates: 36°54′21″N 77°10′22″W
- Area: 28 acres (11 ha)
- Built: 1811
- Architectural style: Early Republic
- NRHP reference No.: 76002124
- VLR No.: 091-0011

Significant dates
- Added to NRHP: November 18, 1976
- Designated VLR: September 21, 1976

Little Town is a historic home located near Littleton, Sussex County, Virginia. It was built in 1811 in two sections. It consists of a two-story, three-bay, double-pile, side-hall-plan block attached to an original three-bay single cell parlor wing. It has a gable roof with a modillion cornice and interior end chimneys. Also on the property is a contributing frame dairy.

It was listed on the National Register of Historic Places in 1976.
