= Nottoway Archeological Site =

Archaeological site in Virginia, United States

- Nottoway Archeological Site (44SX6, 44SX7, 44SX98, 44SX162)
- U.S. National Register of Historic Places
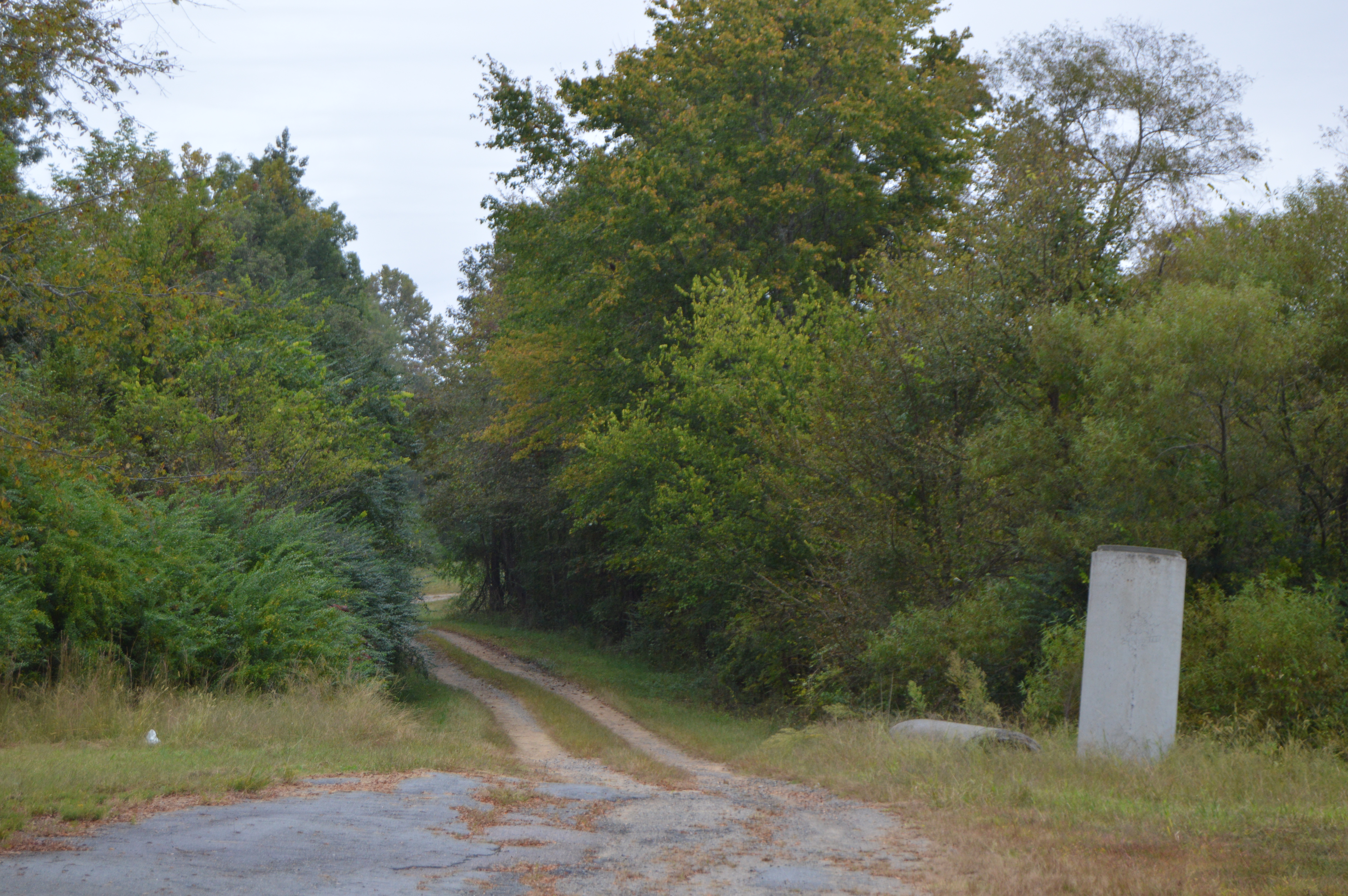
- Property entrance
- Nearest city: Stony Creek, Virginia
- Area: 25 acres (10 ha)
- NRHP reference No.: 88002181
- Added to NRHP: November 3, 1988

The Nottoway Archeological Site is an overlapping series of prehistoric Native American settlement sites near the town of Stony Creek in Sussex County, Virginia. The site, located on a terrace above the Nottoway River, has documented evidence of occupation from c. 9200BCE (the Paleo-Indian period) to c. 1600 (the Late Woodland Period). Finds at the site have included significantly stratified occupation features such as hearths, as well as numerous stone points and hide scrapers.

When listed on the National Register of Historic Places in 1988, this site was among a small number that shed light on Native American occupation of the interior coastal plain in this area. Much more archeological work has since been done to identify more locations.

== See also ==
- National Register of Historic Places listings in Sussex County, Virginia
