= Dr. Beverly Jones House =

Historic house in North Carolina, United States

- U.S. National Register of Historic Places
- Location within North Carolina Location within the United States
- Location: SR 1611, near Bethania, North Carolina
- Coordinates: 36°11′36″N 80°20′12″W
- Area: 7 acres (2.8 ha)
- Built: 1846-1847
- Architect: Cosby, Dabney
- Architectural style: Mid 19th Century Revival, Classical Revival
- NRHP reference No.: 78001947
- Added to NRHP: January 20, 1978

Dr. Beverly Jones House is a historic plantation house located near Bethania, Forsyth County, North Carolina. It was designed by noted Virginia architect Dabney Cosby (1779-1862) and built in 1846–1847. It is a two-story, three bay by two bay, Neoclassical-style brick dwelling with a two-story rear wing. Also on the property are the contributing kitchen, smokehouse, and three slave houses.

It was listed on the National Register of Historic Places in 1978.
