= Templeton, Virginia =

Templeton
- CDP
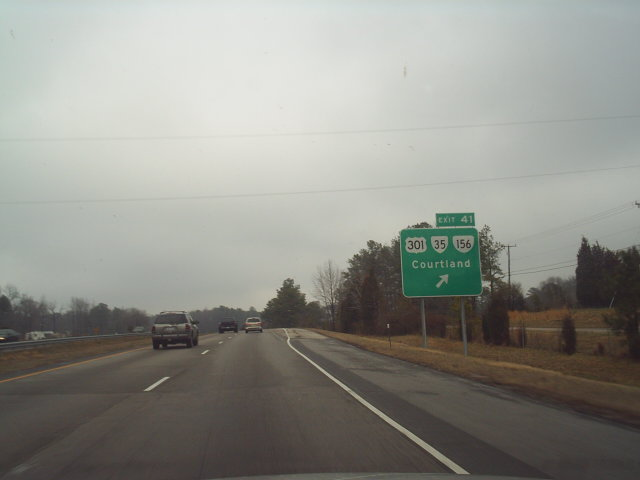
- Northbound Interstate 95 approaching the exit for Templeton. Courtland is located southeast of this view along VA 35.

- Location within the Commonwealth of Virginia
- Coordinates: 37°4′54″N 77°21′17″W
- Country: United States
- State: Virginia
- County: Prince George

Population (2010)
  - Total: 431
- Time zone: UTC−5 (Eastern (EST))
  - Summer (DST): UTC−4 (EDT)
- ZIP codes: 23805
- FIPS code: 51-77925
- GNIS feature ID: 2629847

Templeton is a census-designated place in Prince George County, Virginia, United States. As of the 2020 census, Templeton had a population of 372. Templeton is located along Interstate 95 at Exit 41 where US 301, and Virginia State Routes 35 and 156 converge.

== Demographics ==
Historical population
Census	Pop.	Note	%±
2010	431		—
2020	372		−13.7%
U.S. Decennial Census; 2000 2010

Templeton was first listed as a census designated place in the 2010 U.S. census.

=== Racial and ethnic composition ===
Templeton CDP, Virginia – Racial and ethnic composition Note: the US Census treats Hispanic/Latino as an ethnic category. This table excludes Latinos from the racial categories and assigns them to a separate category. Hispanics/Latinos may be of any race.
Race / Ethnicity (NH = Non-Hispanic)	Pop 2010	Pop 2020	% 2010	% 2020
White alone (NH)	261	175	60.56%	47.04%
Black or African American alone (NH)	116	125	26.91%	33.60%
Native American or Alaska Native alone (NH)	2	2	0.46%	0.54%
Asian alone (NH)	2	0	0.46%	0.00%
Native Hawaiian or Pacific Islander alone (NH)	0	1	0.00%	0.27%
Other race alone (NH)	4	4	0.93%	1.08%
Mixed race or Multiracial (NH)	23	24	5.34%	6.45%
Hispanic or Latino (any race)	23	41	5.34%	11.02%
Total	431	372	100.00%	100.00%
