= John Henry Kapp Farm =

Historic farm in North Carolina, United States

- U.S. National Register of Historic Places
- U.S. Historic district
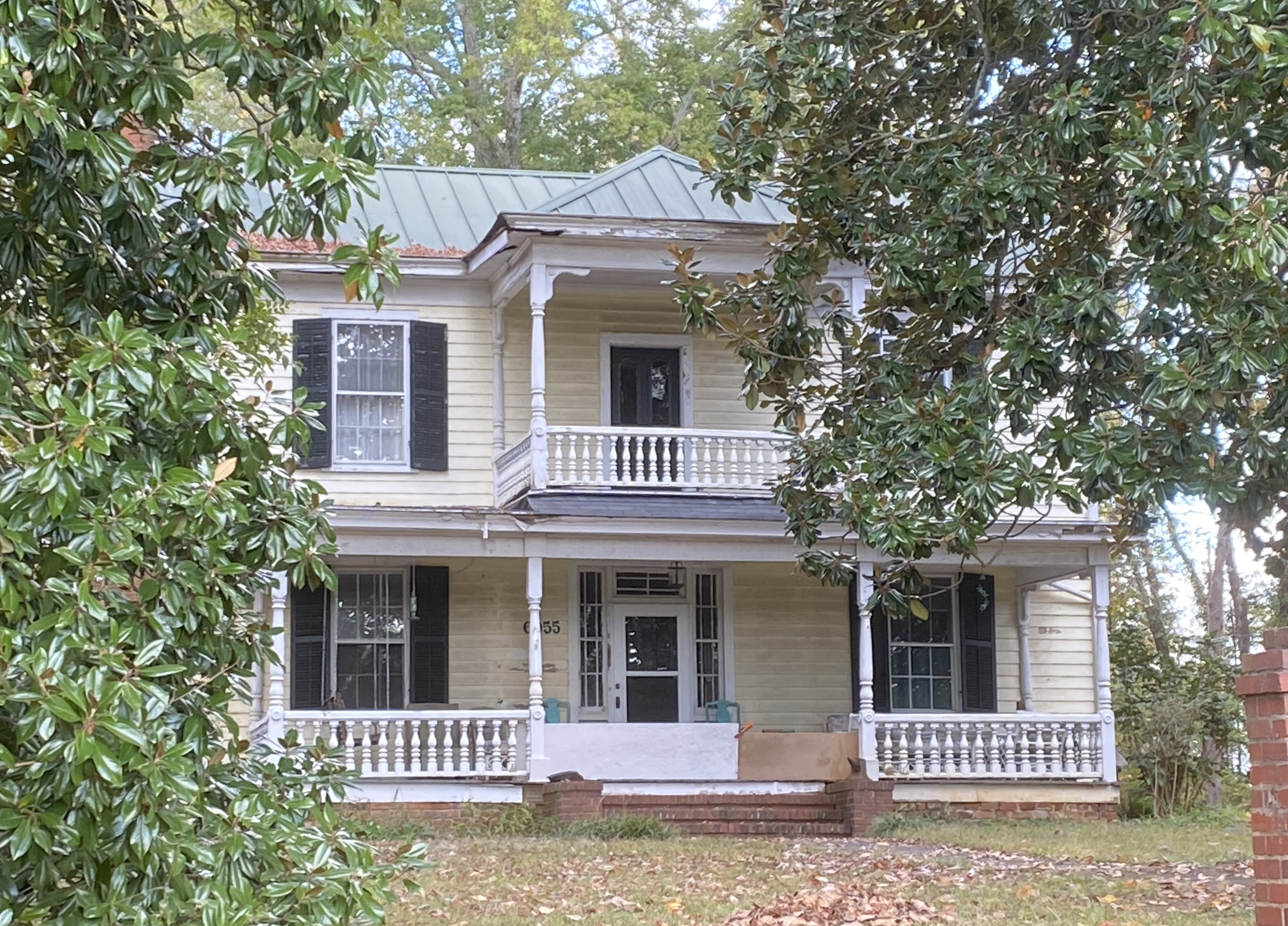

- Location within North Carolina Location within the United States
- Nearest city: North side NC 65, 0.1 miles (0.16 km) east of the junction with NC 67 (4647 Bethania-Tobaccoville Rd.), near Bethania, North Carolina
- Coordinates: 36°10′59″N 80°21′33″W
- Area: 13 acres (5.3 ha)
- Built: c. 1870
- Architectural style: I-house
- NRHP reference No.: 92001087
- Added to NRHP: August 31, 1992

John Henry Kapp Farm is a historic farm complex and national historic district located near Bethania, Forsyth County, North Carolina. The district encompasses seven contributing buildings, one contributing site, and four contributing structures dated between about 1870 and 1942. They include a two-story, frame, vernacular I-house (1870, c. 1880, c. 1910); smokehouse; storage shed (late 1920s); shop (c. 1930); chicken house (1920s); corn crib / granary; barn (1870s); fence (c. 1900); corn crib / granary (c. 1900); tenant house (c. 1900); tobacco pack house (c. 1900); and the agricultural landscape.

It was listed on the National Register of Historic Places in 1992.
