= Samuel B. Stauber Farm =

Historic farm in North Carolina, United States

- U.S. National Register of Historic Places
- U.S. Historic district
- Location within North Carolina Location within the United States
- Location: SR 1611, Bethania, North Carolina
- Coordinates: 36°11′58″N 80°20′57″W
- Area: 6.5 acres (2.6 ha)
- Built: 1852
- Architectural style: Greek Revival
- NRHP reference No.: 87002232
- Added to NRHP: January 12, 1988

Samuel B. Stauber Farm is a historic farm complex and national historic district located near Bethania, Forsyth County, North Carolina. The district encompasses five contributing buildings dated between about 1852 and 1900. They include the two-story, three bay Greek Revival style farmhouse (1852); barn (c. 1847/1852); a slave dwelling (c. 1852); a mid-to-late 19th century smokehouse; and a corn crib / granary.

It was listed on the National Register of Historic Places in 1988.
