= Miles B. Carpenter House =

Historic house in Virginia, United States

- U.S. National Register of Historic Places
- Virginia Landmarks Register
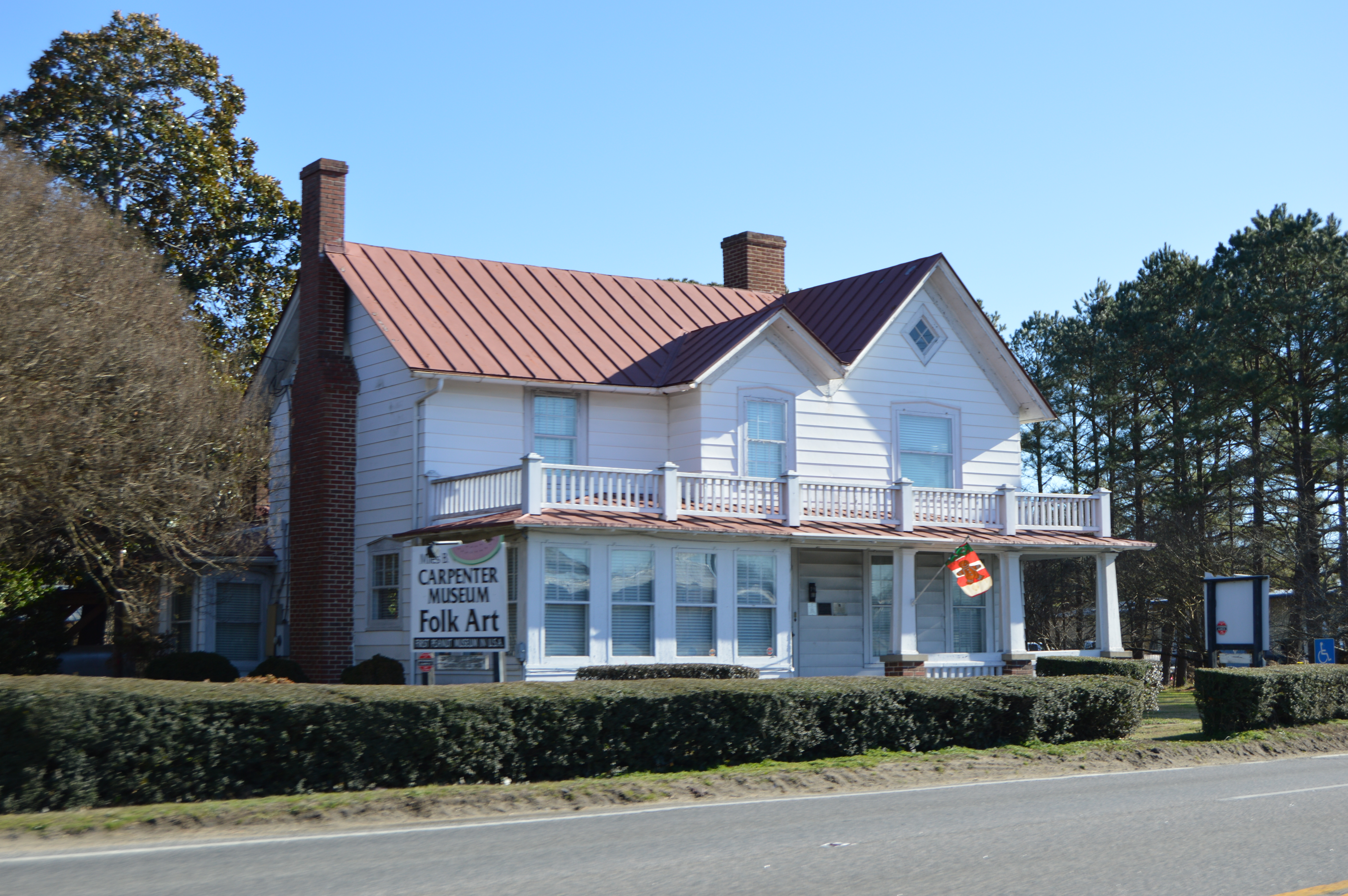
- Front of the house

- Location within Virginia Location within the United States
- Location: US 460, Waverly, Virginia
- Coordinates: 37°2′16″N 77°6′20″W
- Area: 6 acres (2.4 ha)
- NRHP reference No.: 89001920
- VLR No.: 323-0003

Significant dates
- Added to NRHP: November 13, 1989
- Designated VLR: April 18, 1989

The Miles B. Carpenter House, a two-story frame dwelling built in 1890, is located at the intersection of Hunter Street and U.S. Route 460 in Waverly, Sussex County, Virginia. It was added to the National Register of Historic Places on November 13, 1989. In 1912 the home was purchased by Miles B. Carpenter, owner of a local sawmill, planing mill, and ice delivery business, who became a noted American folk artist. A photo of the house can be viewed at this referenced website.

Since Carpenter's death in 1985, his house has been preserved as the Miles B. Carpenter Folk Art Museum in which are displayed his tools and carvings and as a gallery to encourage and exhibit the work of young artists in the region.
