= Garland Gray =

American politician

Member of the Virginia Senate from the 6th district
- In office January 12, 1942 – 1945
- Preceded by: Robert Williams Daniel
- Succeeded by: Edward E. Goodwyn
- In office January 12, 1948 – January 11, 1972
- Preceded by: Edward E. Goodwyn
- Succeeded by: Elmon T. Gray

Personal details
- Born: November 28, 1901 Waverly, Virginia, U.S.
- Died: July, 1977 (aged 74) Richmond, Virginia
- Party: Democratic
- Spouse(s): Agnes E. Taylor; Frances R. Bage
- Children: Elmon T. Gray. Mary Wingate Gray Stettinius, Agnes Elizabeth Gray Duff, Mary Gray Farland
- Education: University of Richmond; Washington and Lee University

Garland Gray (November 28, 1901 – July, 1977, nicknamed "Peck" after Peck's Bad Boy) was a long-time Democratic member of the Virginia Senate representing Southside Virginia counties, including his native Sussex. A lumber and banking executive, Gray became head of the Democratic Caucus in the Virginia Senate, and vehemently opposed school desegregation after the U.S. Supreme Court decisions in Brown v. Board of Education in 1954 and 1955. Although Senator Harry F. Byrd himself supported Massive Resistance, and preferred Gray over other candidates, the Byrd Organization refused to wholeheartedly support Gray's bid to become the party's gubernatorial candidate in 1957, so J. Lindsay Almond won that party's primary and later the Governorship.

== Early and family life ==
Gray was born in the rural community of Gray, in Sussex County, Virginia to Elmon Lee Gray and his wife Ella Virginia Darden Gray. His grandfather Alfred L. Gray had moved to Virginia from Sussex County, Delaware and established a lumber company to harvest the local swamp pines. The family-owned Gray Lumber Co. once owned over one hundred thousand acres of forested land in Prince George County, Surry County, Sussex County, Southampton County and neighboring areas, as well as several of the James River Plantations including Bacon's Castle, Swann's Point and Eastover.

Gray graduated from Waverly High School in 1917 (age 16) and received a bachelor's degree in history from the University of Richmond in 1921 (age 19) and a master's degree in Southern history from Washington and Lee University the following year (age 20). He was also a Mason, member of the Congregational Church (and taught Sunday School), local Ruritan and Rotary Clubs, and of the Phi Kappa Sigma fraternity.

In 1923 Gray married Agnes E. Taylor of Suffolk. The couple had four children: Elmon T., Florence E., Agnes E. and Mary Wingate Gray. Their Surry County summer home, at Swann's Point, overlooked the James River, but was destroyed by fire and not rebuilt. It is now an archeological site owed by the National Park Service. Beginning in 1952, the Grays lived at the former home on Coppahaunk Avenue in Waverly of his uncle Horace Gray. His second wife was Frances Bage. He adopted her daughter, Mary Frances, after their marriage.

== Career ==
Gray was a farmer, industrialist, and later a banker. He joined his father's Gray Lumber Company business in 1922 and operated small lumber mills in Southampton and Sussex counties from 1922 until 1927, when he was made a partner in the company. Gray advocated sustainable forestry, planting young seedlings to replace cut timber. He eventually became chairman of the Board of Gray Products Company. In 1930, the Gray lumber company was one of the first in the South to establish a pension plan for its workers.

In 1931, Gray advocated unemployment insurance (and even financed a study for the state). Four years earlier, the closing of the rival Surry Lumber Company mills (caused in part by their decades-long failure to replant after cutting) devastated the local economy, and the Sussex, Surry and Southampton Railway established by the same owners went bankrupt in mid-1930, worsening the situation. Governor John Garland Pollard appointed Gray to a commission to study unemployment insurance, but that proposal did not need to be adopted in Virginia because of its adoption as part of the New Deal.

Gray became President of the Bank of Waverly in April, 1941, following the death of his uncle Horace. That year, the Gray Lumber Company bought 15,000 acres from the failed Surry Lumber Company, in Dendron, Virginia. Gray also served on the board of directors of the First and Merchants Bank in Richmond.

== Political career ==
Gray began his political career on the county school board (1925-1928), then served on the county Public Welfare Board (1934-1940) and state ports authority beginning in 1935 and becoming its chairman in late 1939 until resigning to assume a seat in the State Senate. His cousin "Red" Gray represented Sussex and Greensville Counties from 1938 to 1942 and also preceded him as president of the national Ruritan Club. Despite many demographic changes in Virginia; Sussex and Greenville Counties had been represented jointly in Virginia's House of Delegates since 1879, and the state Senate district had not changed since 1893.

In November 1941, Peck Gray was elected to the Virginia Senate representing the 6th District (a part-time position), to replace Robert Williams Daniel, who had died in office. He would serve for thirty years, with only a brief gap during World War II when he resigned citing family business obligations after he bought out his brother's interest in the business, his son left for VMI and military service overseas, and a devastating forest fire broke out during his mother's funeral on April 5, 1943 and burned 12,000 acres of timberland. Edward Everard Goodwyn of Emporia, Virginia filled his unexpired term.

However, Gray's political stature grew, as he led various campaigns for the U.S.O. and war bonds, liaised with several wartime agencies, and worked with the Fourth Congressional District Democratic Committee. In 1945, Gray and fellow businessman and state senator Thomas H. Blanton chaired Senator Harry F. Byrd's re-election campaign. Widely considered one of the top lieutenants in the Byrd Democratic Organization, Gray was a delegate to the Democratic National Convention in 1944 and 1948.

In 1947 Gray announced he would seek the seat left vacant by Goodwyn's retirement, and Sussex County clerk William B. Cocke Jr. (acclaimed with Gray for helping elect Watkins Abbitt to the U.S. Congress the previous year) decided not to run. Gray promoted pine as a farm product and served as State Ruritan president, as well as national President in 1948-1949. He also worked with fellow lumber industry officials who also served as state officials, including future governor Thomas B. Stanley of Stanley Furniture and Hugh Camp of Camp Manufacturing Company. By 1949, the newly elected Senator Gray was also vehemently advocating fiscal responsibility.

Despite his family's northern roots in Delaware, Gray's views on race mirrored those of most of his white constituents in the rural Southside Virginia community he represented. One of the last lynchings in Virginia had happened in Gray's hometown, Waverly, in 1925. The victim, James Jordan, was a black employee at Gray's lumber mill who after being identified by a foremen, had been arrested at the mill and jailed for allegedly attacking a white woman and stealing a pistol. An armed mob had descended on the jail and seized Jordan and marched him through the main street in Waverly to the railroad depot where he was strung up a tree and shot multiple times, before his corpse was set on fire in full view of passengers on a Norfolk and Western train that pulled into the station during the macabre proceeding. In 1948, Gray was appointed to a state commission concerning teaching history in the public schools, which later proved controversial for adopting history texts for 4th and 7th graders as well as high school students which presented the American Civil War through the Lost Cause viewpoint.

During Massive Resistance, a month after the U.S. Supreme Court decision in Brown v. Board of Education, Gray led a group of thirty Virginia politicians who urged defiance and met monthly thereafter in a Petersburg firehouse (in Gray's district). Soon, Gray was appointed chairman of a committee, colloquially named after him (the Gray Commission), which developed a plan in November 1955 (six months after the Brown II decision) so no white Virginia child would have to attend a desegregated public school. This plan, which suspended Virginia's compulsory school attendance law and also established a voucher program, which allowed creation of so-called "segregation academies" in many Virginia localities.

After educator Blake T. Newton was elected to the state senate from the Northern Neck region after a 1955 campaign which advocated allowing localities to desegregate schools after Brown v. Board of Education, the Byrd Organization selected Gray to replace him on that state board, in what many considered retaliation. Gray thus served on the State Board of Education from 1957 until 1961. His successor was Anne Dobie Peebles of Sussex County, who served nearly three decades and succeeded future U.S. Supreme Court justice Lewis F. Powell, Jr. as chairman in 1968, becoming that agency's first female leader.

As the Massive Resistance crisis escalated, Gray introduced legislation mandating closure of schools which desegregated (even pursuant to court order), while he also advocated increased funding for scientific and technical studies after Russia's successful Sputnik satellite. Gray also used his influence to cause the Sussex County school board to refuse to renew teaching contracts for two veteran and respected teachers who refused to sign a statement opposing racial desegregation. His relative Frances Stringfellow Gray sat on the Sussex County school board during this time, and in 1964 established Tidewater Academy as a segregation academy, resigning from the public school board the following year. Another participant in Massive Resistance was fellow Virginia Democratic state senator Frederick Thomas Gray (no relation) of Culpeper and the 11th District.

Because of Gray's fiery segregationist rhetoric, he was Byrd's preferred candidate for the Democratic gubernatorial nomination in 1957. However, the Byrd Organization refused to support him wholeheartedly. Lieutenant Governor Gi Stephens said he would run for the governorship if Gray ran. Gray's radicalization had also disturbed Commission Counsel David J. Mays, who thought many of the Stanley Plan laws would be declared unconstitutional by the courts (as they later were).

Gray finally acceded to requests for party unity and deferred to attorney general J. Lindsay Almond (who had segregationist credentials for representing the losing Prince Edward County in a companion case to both Brown decisions). Almond refused Byrd's offer of a position on the Virginia Supreme Court conditioned upon his endorsing Gray. After Gray withdrew from the Democratic primary, Almond easily won the Democratic nomination for Governor of Virginia. A month after Republican president Dwight D. Eisenhower ordered federal troops into Little Rock, Arkansas to support desegregation of those schools, Almond was elected governor over Republican candidate Ted Dalton.

As Virginia's federal courts attempted to enforce desegregation) in 1958 over the vocal opposition of Gray and his supporters, the local school board in Prince Edward County closed its schools for what ultimately became five years. That fall Governor Almond ordered schools in Arlington, Norfolk, Charlottesville and Warren County to close pursuant to various Byrd-Organization-supported Massive Resistance laws rather than comply with federal court orders. However, when the federal courts and Virginia Supreme Court jointly issued decisions ordering integration of the Arlington and Norfolk public schools, Governor Almond allowed those school boards to comply on February 2, 1959, despite much criticism and years of political fallout.

After passage of the Voting Rights Act, Gray faced his first political challenge in years in 1965. Newly graduated University of Virginia physicist and civil rights activist Carey E. Stronach, who would later become a professor at Virginia State University for decades and resided in Prince George County, challenged Gray in the Democratic primary. Redistricting had added more liberal constituents from Williamsburg and James City County. Moreover, the SCOPE Project of the Southern Christian Leadership Conference had sent community organizers from California into Southside Virginia, although their efforts were somewhat thwarted by short monthly voter registration hours established by Southside county clerks. Gray won every precinct in his senatorial district, handily defeating Stronach 8,086 notes to 1,894, and in the general election defeated civil rights activist Rev. Curtis W. Harris of Hopewell.

In 1968, The Richmond Times-Dispatch reported on substandard company owned housing at the Gray's Lumber Mill in Waverly. The article stated that volunteers with the Southern Christian Leadership Conference complained that the living conditions endured by employees of the Gray lumber mill living in company owned housing were among the worst in Virginia. “The Wye community, in which about 200 persons live, is directly behind the lumber company owned by State Sen. Garland Gray. Gray also owns the houses in Wye, which he provides rent-free to their occupants,” SCLC volunteer Laurayne F. James was quoted as saying in The Times-Dispatch report. “ This particular section feeds him with cheap labor, It has not changed in over 100 years” Mrs. James said of the arrangement.

In 1971, Garland Gray announced his retirement, before census redistricting split and relocated what had been his district. The revamped 6th district came to represent Norfolk, as did the reconstructed 5th and 7th districts (instead of the 3-senator 2nd district that represented Norfolk during the previous decade). Thus, arguably Stanley C. Walker succeeded Gray. However, Greensville County and the City of Emporia (which he had represented for decades) were combined with Suffolk, Southampton, Isle of Wight, Nansemond and Dinwiddie Counties into the new 15th District, and came to be represented by his former colleague of the 5th District, William V. Rawlings of Franklin, Virginia until his death 4 years later (only to be succeeded by J. Lewis Rawls, Jr. of Suffolk County after a special 1975 election). Sussex, Surry and Prince George Counties and the city of Hopewell (the rest of Gray's long-time 6th district) were combined with Colonial Heights (which had been in the 29th district) and Petersburg (formerly in the 7th district) as the new 16th district, and his son Elmon T. Gray was elected to that district (and would be re-elected numerous times).

== Death ==
Gray died in July, 1977 in Richmond, Virginia, survived by his wife, son Elmon and four daughters. His first wife, Agnes Taylor Gray had died on October 7, 1962. Continuing his and Agnes' philanthropy in the neighboring community, a foundation was created by Elmon Gray, as well as a professorship in forestry at Virginia Tech. The Virginia Historical Society has the family's scrapbook from the 1940s (until 1950).

== Legacy ==
The Virginia Department of Forestry (VDOF) Garland Gray Forestry Center is named for Senator Gray. The center is located next to the Nottoway River, which provides irrigation for 80 acres of loblolly pine seed beds. The sandy soils at the nursery are ideal for pine seedling production. The Loblolly pine seedlings produced here are the result of rigorous Tree Improvement Program (TIP) testing and are proven high performers for Virginia conditions. A 213-acre tree seedling nursery was established within the boundaries of the Garland Gray Forestry Center in 1984. The Garland Gray Forestry Center has state-of-the-art harvesting equipment and a first-class grading, packaging and cold storage facility for preparing the loblolly tree seedlings for shipment.

Senate of Virginia
Preceded by Robert W. Daniel	Virginia Senate, District 6; 1942–1972	Succeeded by Stanley C. Walker
