= Bethania, North Carolina =

Town in North Carolina, United States

- Town
- Seal

- Location in Forsyth County and the state of North Carolina
- Coordinates: 36°10′51″N 80°20′15″W
- Country: United States
- State: North Carolina
- County: Forsyth
- Founded: 1759
- Incorporated: 1839, 1995
- Named for: Bethany

Area
  - Total: 0.68 sq mi (1.77 km^{2})
  - Land: 0.68 sq mi (1.76 km^{2})
  - Water: 0.0039 sq mi (0.01 km^{2})
- Elevation: 804 ft (245 m)

Population (2020)
  - Total: 344
  - Density: 507.0/sq mi (195.75/km^{2})
- Time zone: UTC-5 (Eastern (EST))
  - Summer (DST): UTC-4 (EDT)
- ZIP code: 27010
- Area code: 336
- FIPS code: 37-05340
- GNIS feature ID: 2405252
- Website: www.townofbethania.org

Bethania is the oldest municipality in Forsyth County, North Carolina, United States, and was most recently incorporated in 1995, upon the reactivation of the original 1838/1839 town charter. In 2009, Bethania celebrated the 250th anniversary of its establishment in 1759. As of the 2020 census, the town population was 341.

== History ==
The first planned Moravian settlement in North Carolina, Bethania exists as the only remaining independent, continuously active Moravian village in the southern United States, and is the only known existing Germanic-type linear agricultural village in the South. The 500-acre (2.0 km^{2}) Bethania National Historic Landmark district is the largest such district in Forsyth County. Bethania and its 18th- and 19th-century properties are listed on the National Register of Historic Places.

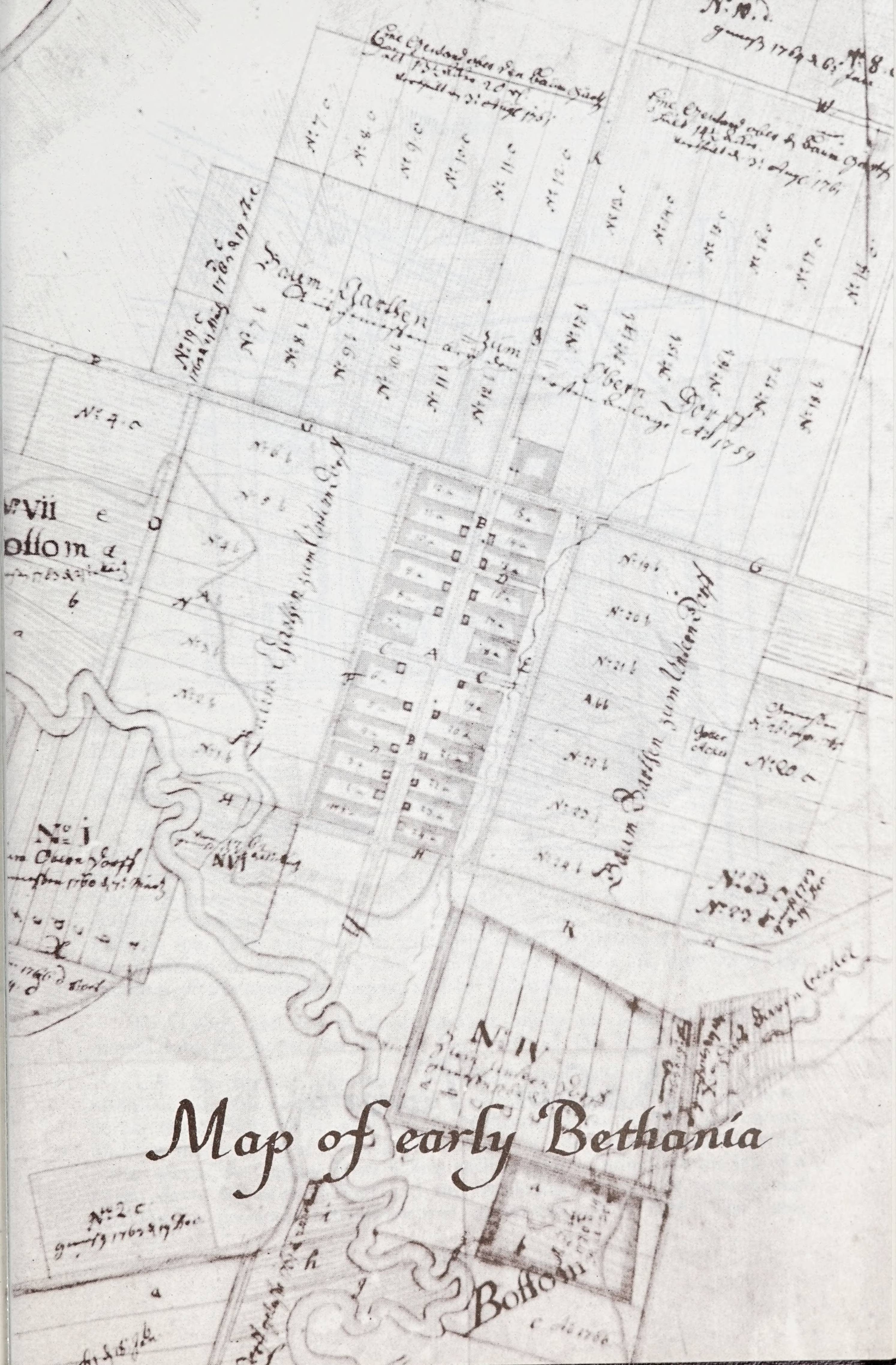
Map of early Bethania.

Bethania was founded June 12, 1759, by the Moravian Brethren of Wachovia as a congregational, agricultural, and trades community. Bethania was the first planned Moravian settlement in Wachovia, and members of a "Society", under the care of the Bethania congregation, were permitted to reside in the village after July 1759. Today, Bethania's eighteenth-century German-type linear agricultural village design remains visible and intact, and most town lots and roadways have remained in continuous use since 1759. The name "Bethania" is the German form of "Bethany", the name of a village near Jerusalem recorded in the New Testament as the home of Mary, Martha and Lazarus, as well as that of Simon the Leper.

During the Revolutionary War, this town was for a time considered by locals not as "Bethania" but as "HauserTown" (pronounced Hooz-er) because of the significance of families with the last name Hauser that resided there. Mary Hauser was one of the first people buried in Bethania's God's Acre cemetery.

In March 2007, the town of Bethania opened a visitor center and museum, Historic Bethania, to welcome friends and guests, and to promote education and cultural resource preservation in the community. The center's facilities include a relocated and restored Moravian farmstead home, the Wolff-Moser House, dating to ca. 1792, one of the earliest known surviving rural Moravian farmstead homes in North America. The Wolff-Moser House can be visited by the public during the center's open hours. The visitor center, located at 5393 Ham Horton Lane, at the intersection of Main Street and Bethania Road, also serves as an orientation center for those wishing to explore the Bethania National Historic Landmark District. Visitors to the c. 1759 Bethania Historic District can obtain a tour map and additional information at the visitor center.

In addition to the Bethania Historic District, the Dr. Beverly Jones House, John Henry Kapp Farm, and Samuel B. Stauber Farm are listed on the National Register of Historic Places.

Bethania Mill and Village Shoppes, the only shopping center within the city limits, opened October 18, 2008, at the site of an old seed mill. The center contains a general store and plans to have a restaurant. They currently are renting out office space.

== Geography ==
Bethania is located in northwestern Forsyth County and is entirely surrounded by the city limits of Winston-Salem. It is 10 miles (16 km) northwest of the city center.

According to the United States Census Bureau, the town has a total area of 0.69 square miles (1.8 km^{2}), of which 0.004 square miles (0.01 km^{2}), or 0.80%, is water.

== Demographics ==
Historical population
Census	Pop.	Note	%±
1880	105		—
2000	354		—
2010	328		−7.3%
2020	344		4.9%
2021 (est.)	346	▲	0.6%
U.S. Decennial Census

=== 2020 census ===
Bethania racial composition
Race	Number	Percentage
White (non-Hispanic)	277	80.52%
Black or African American (non-Hispanic)	32	9.3%
Native American	1	0.29%
Pacific Islander	2	0.58%
Other/Mixed	11	3.2%
Hispanic or Latino	21	6.1%

As of the 2020 United States census, there were 344 people, 146 households, and 115 families residing in the town.

=== 2000 census ===
As of the census of 2000, there were 354 people, 139 households, and 111 families residing in the town. The population density was 490.0 inhabitants per square mile (189.2/km^{2}). There were 148 housing units at an average density of 204.8 per square mile (79.1/km^{2}). The racial makeup of the town was 81.92% White, 15.82% African American, 0.28% Asian, and 1.98% from two or more races. Hispanic or Latino of any race were 2.54% of the population.

There were 139 households, out of which 32.4% had children under the age of 18 living with them, 69.8% were married couples living together, 8.6% had a female householder with no husband present, and 20.1% were non-families. 15.8% of all households were made up of individuals, and 5.0% had someone living alone who was 65 years of age or older. The average household size was 2.55 and the average family size was 2.84.

In the town, the population was spread out, with 23.4% under the age of 18, 3.4% from 18 to 24, 29.4% from 25 to 44, 29.9% from 45 to 64, and 13.8% who were 65 years of age or older. The median age was 42 years. For every 100 females, there were 91.4 males. For every 100 females age 18 and over, there were 96.4 males.

The median income for a household in the town was $51,875, and the median income for a family was $55,357. Males had a median income of $45,500 versus $27,813 for females. The per capita income for the town was $25,702. About 7.3% of families and 8.3% of the population were below the poverty line, including 13.7% of those under age 18 and 9.3% of those age 65 or over.

== Education ==
Bethania, as of the rest of Forsyth County, is within the Winston-Salem/Forsyth County Schools school district.

School zoning is as follows: The western half of Bethania is zoned to Old Richmond Elementary School, while the northeastern part is zoned to Gibson Elementary School, and the southeastern part is zoned to Old Town Elementary School. Zoned secondary schools are Northwest Middle School and North Forsyth High School.
