= Edward E. Goodwyn =

American politician

Edward Everard Goodwyn
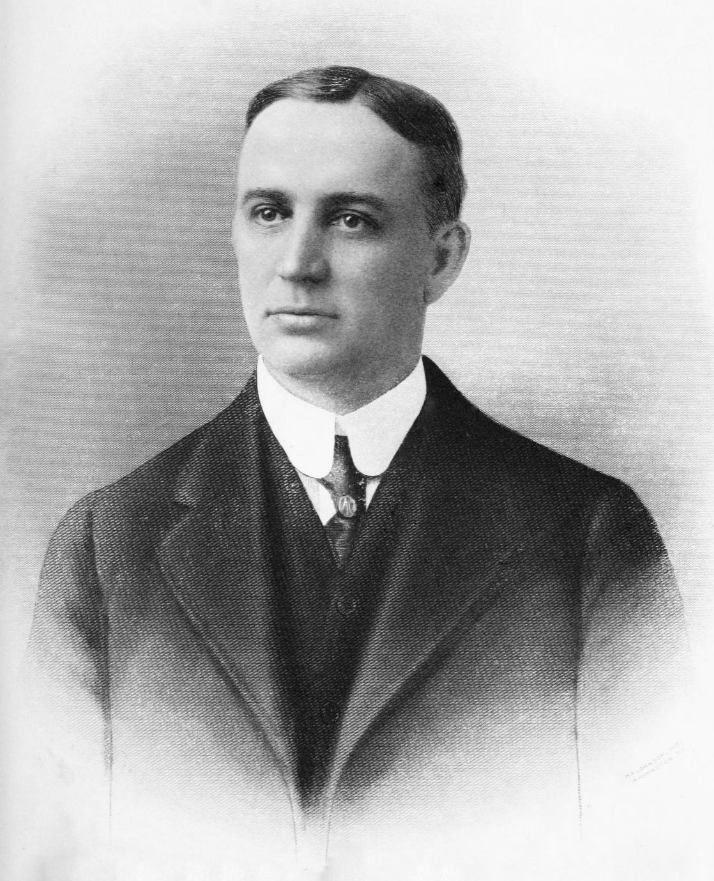

Member of the Virginia Senate from the 6th district
- In office 1945–1947
- Preceded by: Garland Gray
- Succeeded by: Garland Gray

Personal details
- Born: September 26, 1874 Greensville, Virginia, U.S.
- Died: April 29, 1961 (aged 86) Richmond, Virginia, U.S.
- Party: Democratic
- Spouse: Lucille Grigg
- Education: Franklin Academy
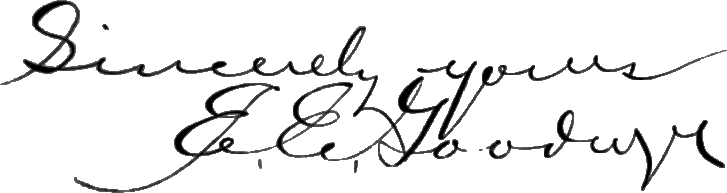
- Signature

Military service
- Allegiance: United States
- Branch/service: United States Army
- Years of service: 1914-1919, 1936-1940
- Rank: Brigadier General
- Unit: Virginia Militia
- Battles/wars: First World War

Edward Everard Goodwyn (September 26, 1874 – April 29, 1961) (nicknamed "E.E.") was a Southside Virginia militia leader and real estate and insurance executive who served as a Democratic short-term member of the Virginia Senate representing his native Greensville, Suffolk and Surry Counties. Goodwyn was appointed to the unexpired term of state senator Garland Gray when Gray announced his resignation citing family business obligations. Two years later, Goodwyn announced his retirement, Gray entered the race and was again elected to his former seat.

== Early life ==
Goodwyn was born in Greensville County, Virginia, to Daniel Everard Goodwyn (who could trace his descent to the English nobleman Henry of Buckinghamshire as well as to Peterson Goodwyn who served in the American Revolutionary War and United States Congress) and his wife, the former Fanny Hayes. Edward had two siblings and was educated in the local public schools and at Franklin Academy. In 1908 he married Annabelle Powell and, following her death, later married Lucille Grigg, some 40 years his junior. He had several children.

== Military career ==
At age 19, Goodwyn enlisted as a private in the Fourth Virginia Volunteer Infantry in Franklin, Virginia, and established a similar organization when he moved to Emporia in 1895. He was elected second lieutenant of the Greenville Guards (Emporia being the County Seat) in 1900, successively rising in the militia ranks to become a Major of the Norfolk and Tidewater infantry companies in 1912. Goodwyn served in France during World War I, rising to colonel of the 29th Division.

After his discharge, he commanded the state American Legion (1922-1923) and served on its national executive committee 1923-1925. He was commissioned Brigadier General in the Virginia Militia in 1934. On December 1, 1940, Governor James Hubert Price designated Goodwyn to organize the Virginia Protective Force, a position he held throughout World War II.

== Career ==
In civilian life, Goodwyn was a real estate and insurance agent, starting that business in Emporia in 1895. He became a cashier of the Greensville Bank in 1897, but gave that up to concentrate on his insurance business, which became one of the largest in Southside Virginia. In 1902 he became a vice president of the newly organized Farmers and Merchants Bank in Emporia, as well as led efforts to electrify the county seat. Goodwyn served on the local school board (as its chairman for 10 years) and chaired the Greenville County Democratic Committee. He also served on the vestry of his Episcopal Church, on the board of the Jackson-Field Episcopal Home for Girls and on the board of directors of the Emporia Federal Savings and Loan Association, Citizens National Bank, the Citizens Road League and as chairman of the Route 301 Highway Association. He was executive of the local chamber of commerce and on the board of the state organization, as well as active in the Masons, Odd Fellows, Sons of the American Revolution, Shriners and Kiwanis.

== Political career ==
Goodwyn was appointed to fill the unexpired term of Garland Gray, who announced his resignation in 1945 in order to focus on his family's lumber company. Goodwyn announced his retirement before the next election in 1947, and Garland Gray once again ran for the office and resumed what had been his seat.

== Death and legacy ==
Goodwyn died on April 29, 1961. A historical marker was erected in his memory.

Senate of Virginia
Preceded by Garland Gray	Virginia Senate, District 6; 1946–1947	Succeeded by Garland Gray
