= Venable Hall =

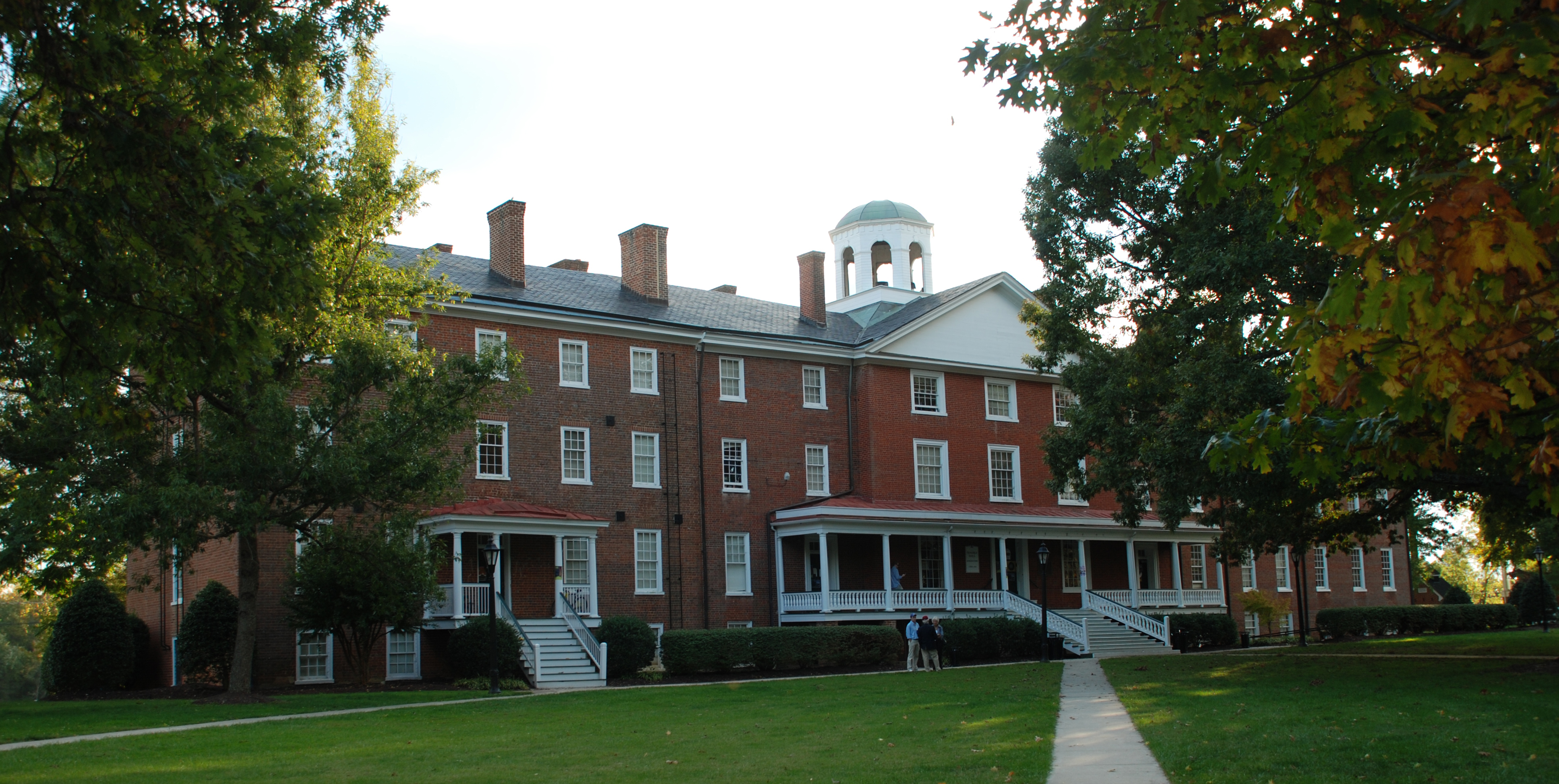
- Venable Hall at Hampden–Sydney. Front facade, from the north.
- Interactive map of the Venable Hall area
- Etymology: Richard Venable

General information
- Type: Dormitory
- Architectural style: Federal
- Location: Hampden Sydney, Virginia, United States
- Coordinates: 37.240361°N 78.46092°W
- Current tenants: Hampden–Sydney College
- Construction started: 1824
- Completed: 1830
- Owner: Hampden–Sydney College

Technical details
- Floor count: 4

Design and construction
- Architects: Dabney Cosby, Reuben and John Perry

Union Theological Seminary (Venable Hall) c. 1830s

Venable Hall is a dormitory at Hampden–Sydney College in southside Virginia. Built in sections from 1824 to 1830, Venable Hall is the second oldest dormitory on Hampden–Sydney's campus. The building is listed in the Virginia Landmarks Register (1969) and on the National Register of Historic Places (1970) as a contributing property to Hampden–Sydney College Historic District.

== History ==
Construction of Venable Hall began in 1824 and was completed in three separate phases by 1830. The building was designed and constructed by Dabney Cosby in the Federal style of architecture and designed to complement Cushing Hall.

When completed in 1830, the building was the home of the Union Theological Seminary. Venable Hall provided the first Presbyterian seminary in the South and eventually became the head institution of the Southern Presbyterian Church. The seminary existed in Hampden–Sydney until 1898 when it moved to its current location in Richmond.

Subsequent to the Seminary's move to Richmond, Major Richard Venable, Hampden–Sydney Class of 1857, bought its buildings for $10,000 and gave them to the college, doubling the size of the campus. Named in his honor, Venable Hall is now a residence hall and contains the Parents & Friends Lounge, the former Seminary chapel. Graduation, typically held in May, is conducted in the front lawn of Venable Hall.
