= Waverly Downtown Historic District =

Historic district in Virginia, United States

- U.S. National Register of Historic Places
- U.S. Historic district
- Virginia Landmarks Register
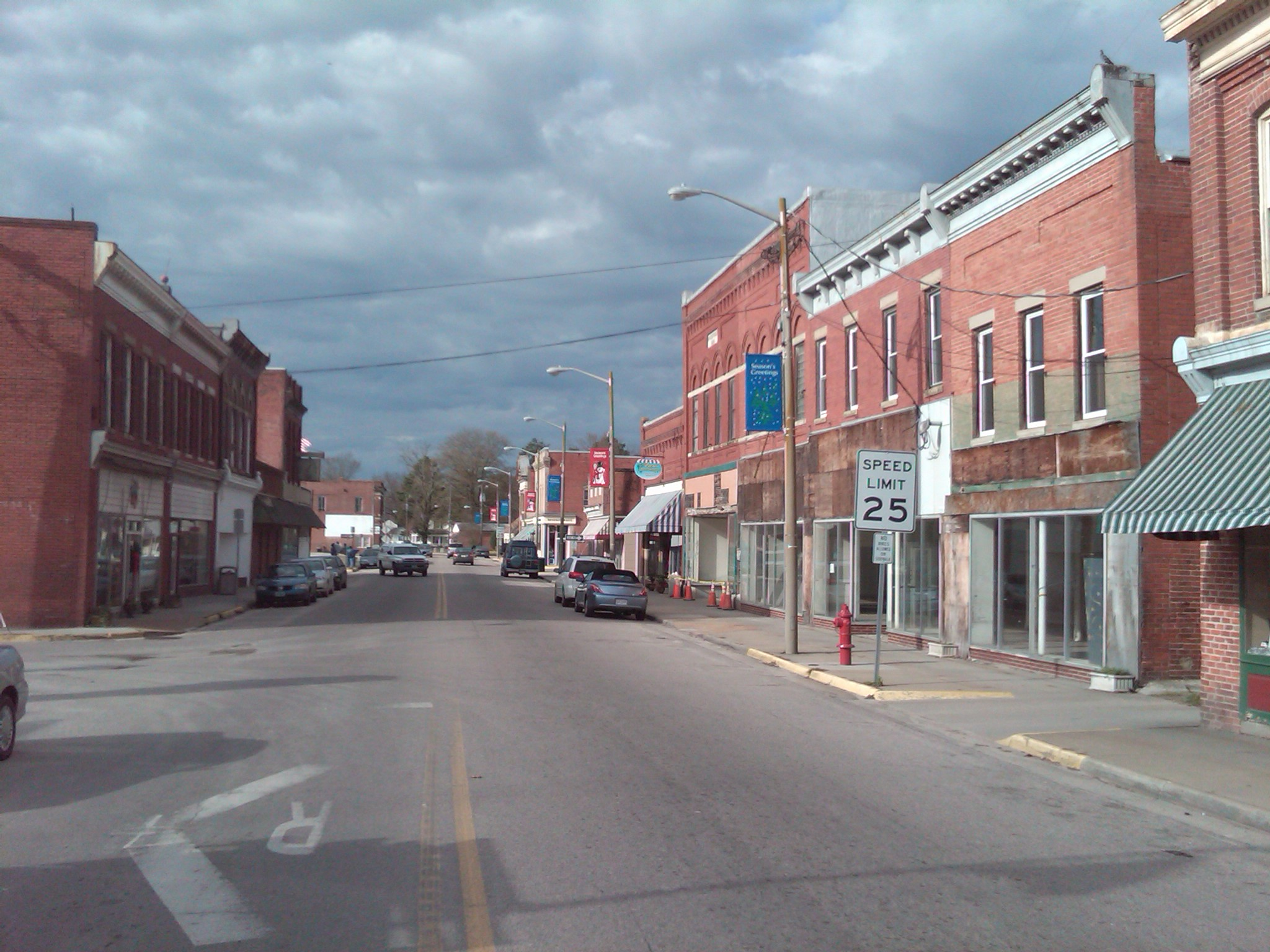
- Main Street

- Location within Virginia Location within the United States
- Location: Generally surrounding West Main Street from County Drive West to Coppahaunk Avenue, Waverly, Virginia
- Coordinates: 37°02′09″N 77°05′45″W
- Area: 21 acres (8.5 ha)
- Built: c. 1854
- Architect: Multiple
- Architectural style: Late 19th And 20th Century Revivals, Folk Victorian, Italianate, Early Commercial
- NRHP reference No.: 13000344
- VLR No.: 323-5019

Significant dates
- Added to NRHP: May 28, 2013
- Designated VLR: March 21, 2013

The Waverly Downtown Historic District is a national historic district located at Waverly, Sussex County, Virginia. The district encompasses 48 contributing buildings, 1 contributing site, and 2 contributing structures in the central business district of Waverly. The buildings represent a variety of popular architectural styles including Folk Victorian and Italianate. They include residential, commercial, governmental, and institutional buildings dating from the mid-19th to mid-20th centuries. Notable buildings include the Waverly Municipal Hall (c. 1880), Atlantic and Danville Railroad Station (c. 1883), Masonic Lodge/Town Hall (c. 1897), Boarding House (c. 1900), Moss Hardware Building (c. 1915), Fleetwood Building (1904), Warner Grammer Store (c. 1904), Wilcox Building (c. 1904), former Waverly Post Office/ Palace Cigar and Pool Room (1961), and Waverly Town Shops and Water Tower (1932).

It was listed on the National Register of Historic Places in 2013.
