= Yale, Virginia =

- Unincorporated community
- Location within Virginia Location within the United States
- Coordinates: 36°50′45″N 77°17′15″W
- Country: United States
- State: Virginia
- County: Sussex
- Elevation: 108 ft (33 m)
- Time zone: UTC−5 (Eastern (EST))
  - Summer (DST): UTC−4 (EDT)
- ZIP code: 23897
- Area code: 434
- GNIS feature ID: 1477738

Yale is an unincorporated community in rural Sussex County, Virginia, United States. Its ZIP code is 23897.

== Hunting Quarter Plantation ==
The historic Hunting Quarter plantation is located near Yale. Hunting Quarter, was built after 1745 by Captain Henry Harrison, who fought in the French and Indian War. Captain Harrison was a brother of Benjamin Harrison V, a signatory of the U.S. Declaration of Independence, and uncle of President William Henry Harrison (1774-1841). "Hunting Quarter" remained in the possession of the Harrison family until 1887. Hunting Quarter is listed on the National Register of Historic Places.
