= Sussex County Courthouse Historic District =

Historic district in Virginia, United States

- U.S. National Register of Historic Places
- U.S. Historic district
- Virginia Landmarks Register
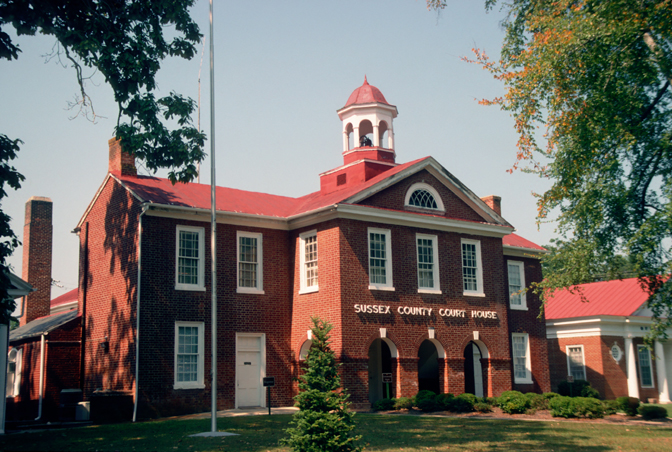
- Sussex County Courthouse (Built 1828), September 2001

- Location within Virginia Location within the United States
- Location: Jct. of VA 634 and 626, Sussex, Virginia
- Coordinates: 36°54′55″N 77°16′47″W
- Area: 50 acres (20 ha)
- Built: c. 1800
- Built by: Cosby, Dabney; Et al.
- Architectural style: Early Republic, Jeffersonian Classicism
- NRHP reference No.: 73002066
- VLR No.: 091-0072

Significant dates
- Added to NRHP: July 24, 1973
- Designated VLR: October 17, 1972

Sussex County Courthouse Historic District is a historic courthouse complex and national historic district located at Sussex, Sussex County, Virginia. The district encompasses four buildings in the complex: the clerk's office (1924), the court house, the County Office Building, jail and the Dillard House (c. 1800). Other buildings are the mid-19th century county treasurer's office and the John Bannister House. The county courthouse building was built in 1828 by Dabney Cosby, and is a two-story, seven-bay, Jeffersonian Classicism style brick building. It has a cross-gable roof with cupola and features a three-bay arcade, one-bay deep with five rounded arches, on its front facade. A six-bay brick addition was built in 1954. The building is one of a number of county courthouses inspired by the architecture of Thomas Jefferson, who employed its builder Dabney Cosby in the building of the University of Virginia.

It was listed on the National Register of Historic Places in 1973.
