= Stony Creek, Virginia =

- Town
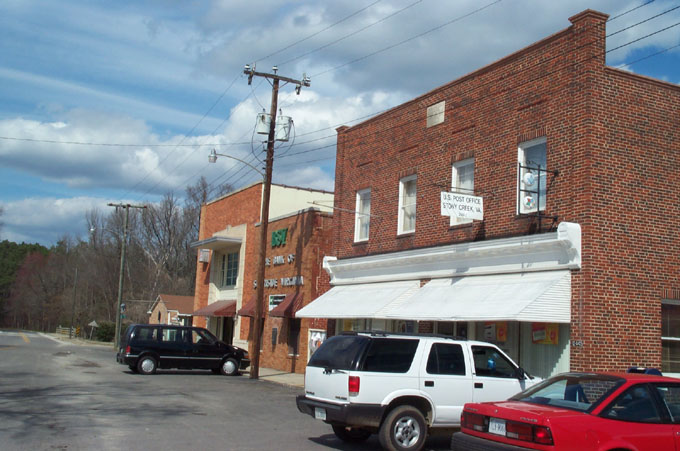
- Downtown

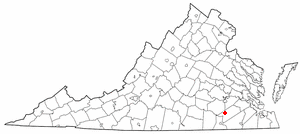
- Location of Stony Creek, Virginia
- Coordinates: 36°56′47″N 77°23′59″W
- Country: United States
- State: Virginia
- County: Sussex

Area
  - Total: 0.58 sq mi (1.49 km^{2})
  - Land: 0.58 sq mi (1.49 km^{2})
  - Water: 0 sq mi (0.00 km^{2})
- Elevation: 95 ft (29 m)

Population (2020)
  - Total: 209
  - Estimate (2019): 178
  - Density: 309.1/sq mi (119.34/km^{2})
- Time zone: UTC−5 (Eastern (EST))
  - Summer (DST): UTC−4 (EDT)
- ZIP code: 23882
- Area code: 434
- FIPS code: 51-75840
- GNIS feature ID: 1500170

Stony Creek is a town in Sussex County, Virginia, United States. As of the 2020 census, Stony Creek had a population of 209.

== History ==
In 1848, Stony Creek was a stop on the Petersburg Railroad. Both the plantation house of Glenview and the Nottoway Archeological Site are listed on the National Register of Historic Places.

== Geography ==
Stony Creek is located at 36°56′47″N 77°23′59″W (36.946277, −77.399837). According to the United States Census Bureau, the town has a total area of 0.6 square mile (1.5 km^{2}), all land.

Stony Creek is located along Interstate 95 at Exit 31 (VA 40), but it is also served by Exit 33 (VSR 602) with US 301 running along the west side as a frontage road at both interchanges. The former Petersburg Railroad line is now part of the CSX North End Subdivision.

== Demographics ==
Historical population
Census	Pop.	Note	%±
1920	345		—
1930	465		34.8%
1940	493		6.0%
1950	482		−2.2%
1960	437		−9.3%
1970	430		−1.6%
1980	329		−23.5%
1990	271		−17.6%
2000	202		−25.5%
2010	198		−2.0%
2020	209		5.6%
U.S. Decennial Census

As of the census of 2000, there were 202 people, 99 households, and 56 families living in the town. The population density was 350.6 people per square mile (134.5/km^{2}). There were 118 housing units at an average density of 204.8 per square mile (78.6/km^{2}). The racial makeup of the town was 69.80% White, 29.21% African American and 0.99% Asian.

There were 99 households, out of which 16.2% had children under the age of 18 living with them, 45.5% were married couples living together, 7.1% had a female householder with no husband present, and 43.4% were non-families. 38.4% of all households were made up of individuals, and 16.2% had someone living alone who was 65 years of age or older. The average household size was 2.04 and the average family size was 2.71.

In the town, the population was spread out, with 16.8% under the age of 18, 4.0% from 18 to 24, 29.7% from 25 to 44, 28.2% from 45 to 64, and 21.3% who were 65 years of age or older. The median age was 45 years. For every 100 females, there were 96.1 males. For every 100 females aged 18 and over, there were 88.8 males.

The median income for a household in the town was $33,125, and the median income for a family was $48,750. Males had a median income of $31,667 versus $21,964 for females. The per capita income for the town was $27,693. About 9.3% of families and 10.3% of the population were below the poverty line, including 11.8% of those under the age of eighteen and 12.5% of those 65 or over.

== Climate ==
The climate in this area is characterized by hot, humid summers and generally mild to cool winters. According to the Köppen Climate Classification system, Stony Creek has a humid subtropical climate, abbreviated "Cfa" on climate maps.

Climate data for Stony Creek, Virginia (1991–2020 normals, extremes 1960–present)
Month	Jan	Feb	Mar	Apr	May	Jun	Jul	Aug	Sep	Oct	Nov	Dec	Year
Record high °F (°C)	83 (28)	85 (29)	92 (33)	100 (38)	98 (37)	106 (41)	105 (41)	106 (41)	105 (41)	99 (37)	85 (29)	82 (28)	106 (41)
Mean daily maximum °F (°C)	49.2 (9.6)	53.1 (11.7)	60.7 (15.9)	71.4 (21.9)	78.4 (25.8)	85.6 (29.8)	89.6 (32.0)	87.3 (30.7)	81.6 (27.6)	71.4 (21.9)	61.4 (16.3)	52.8 (11.6)	70.2 (21.2)
Daily mean °F (°C)	38.0 (3.3)	40.8 (4.9)	47.7 (8.7)	58.0 (14.4)	66.3 (19.1)	74.6 (23.7)	78.7 (25.9)	76.7 (24.8)	70.4 (21.3)	58.9 (14.9)	48.7 (9.3)	41.6 (5.3)	58.4 (14.7)
Mean daily minimum °F (°C)	26.8 (−2.9)	28.6 (−1.9)	34.8 (1.6)	44.6 (7.0)	54.1 (12.3)	63.6 (17.6)	67.8 (19.9)	66.0 (18.9)	59.3 (15.2)	46.5 (8.1)	36.0 (2.2)	30.5 (−0.8)	46.6 (8.1)
Record low °F (°C)	−9 (−23)	−6 (−21)	10 (−12)	20 (−7)	27 (−3)	38 (3)	47 (8)	42 (6)	32 (0)	18 (−8)	11 (−12)	2 (−17)	−9 (−23)
Average precipitation inches (mm)	3.38 (86)	2.83 (72)	4.27 (108)	3.40 (86)	3.93 (100)	4.51 (115)	5.16 (131)	4.80 (122)	4.81 (122)	3.84 (98)	3.00 (76)	3.67 (93)	47.60 (1,209)
Average snowfall inches (cm)	1.9 (4.8)	1.4 (3.6)	0.5 (1.3)	0.0 (0.0)	0.0 (0.0)	0.0 (0.0)	0.0 (0.0)	0.0 (0.0)	0.0 (0.0)	0.0 (0.0)	0.0 (0.0)	0.5 (1.3)	4.3 (11)
Average precipitation days (≥ 0.01 in)	7.9	6.9	8.5	7.9	8.6	8.1	8.4	7.6	6.8	6.2	6.7	7.4	91.0
Average snowy days (≥ 0.1 in)	0.8	0.8	0.3	0.1	0.0	0.0	0.0	0.0	0.0	0.0	0.0	0.4	2.4
Source: NOAA
