= Sussex, Virginia =

Census-designated place in Virginia, US

Coordinates: 37°54′55″N 77°16′45″W

Sussex is a census-designated place (CDP) in and the county seat of Sussex County, Virginia, United States. The population as of the 2020 Census was 181.

The Sussex County Courthouse Historic District was listed on the National Register of Historic Places in 1973.

== Demographics ==
Historical population
Census	Pop.	Note	%±
2010	256		—
2020	181		−29.3%
U.S. Decennial Census; 2010 2020

Sussex was first listed as a census designated place in the 2010 U.S. census.

=== 2020 census ===
Sussex CDP, Virginia – Racial and ethnic composition (NH = Non-Hispanic) Note: the US Census treats Hispanic/Latino as an ethnic category. This table excludes Latinos from the racial categories and assigns them to a separate category. Hispanics/Latinos may be of any race.
Race / Ethnicity	Pop 2010	Pop 2020	% 2010	% 2020
White alone (NH)	114	99	44.53%	54.70%
Black or African American alone (NH)	133	75	51.95%	41.44%
Native American or Alaska Native alone (NH)	1	0	0.39%	0.00%
Asian alone (NH)	0	0	0.00%	0.00%
Pacific Islander alone (NH)	0	0	0.00%	0.00%
Some Other Race alone (NH)	0	2	0.00%	1.10%
Mixed Race/Multi-Racial (NH)	0	5	0.00%	2.76%
Hispanic or Latino (any race)	8	0	3.13%	0.00%
Total	256	181	100.00%	100.00%
