= Waverly, Virginia =

- Town
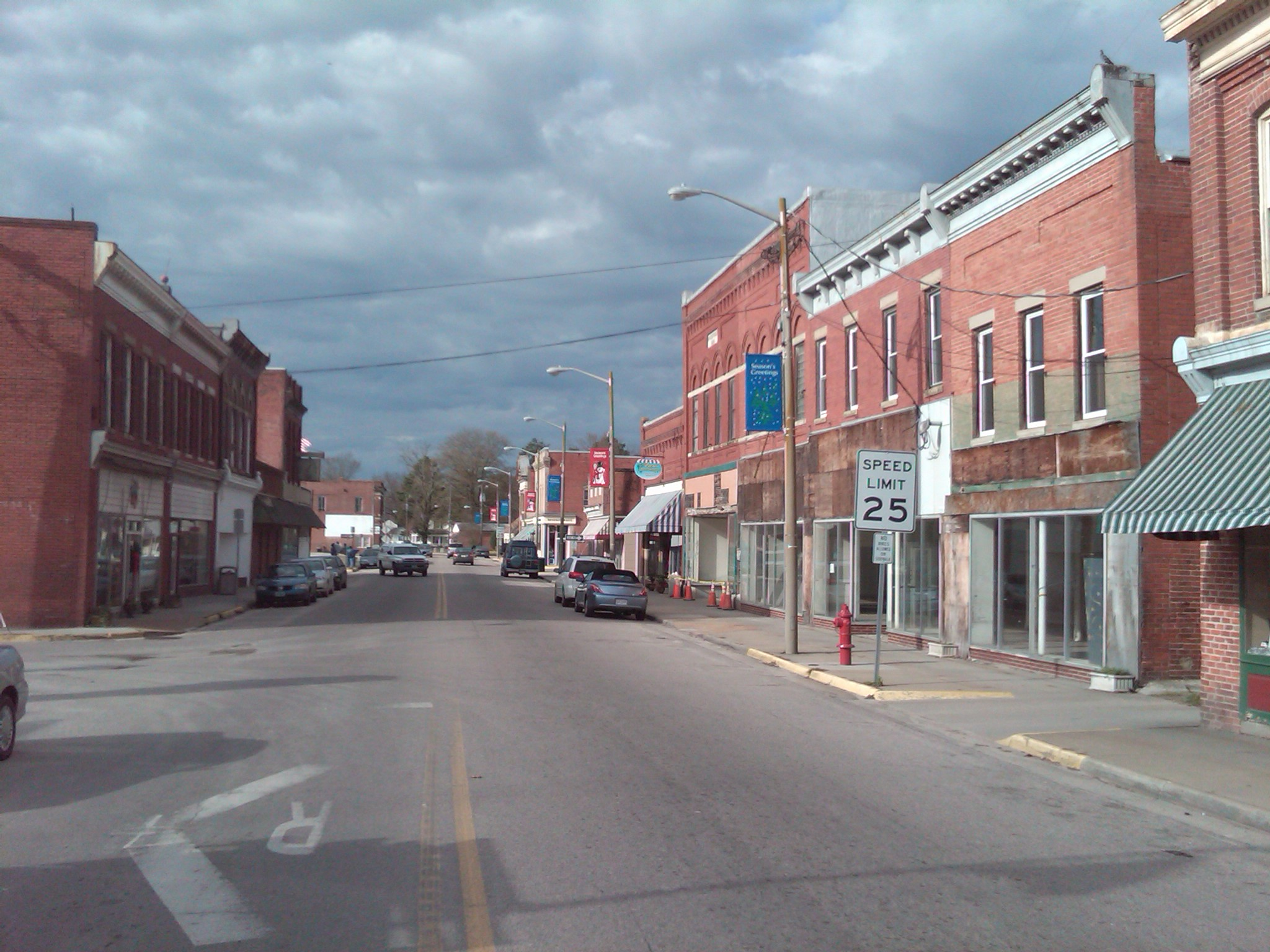
- Downtown Waverly

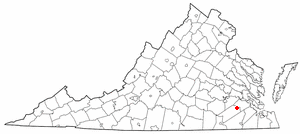
- Location of Waverly, Virginia
- Coordinates: 37°2′2″N 77°5′43″W
- Country: United States
- State: Virginia
- County: Sussex

Area
  - Total: 3.08 sq mi (7.99 km^{2})
  - Land: 3.08 sq mi (7.99 km^{2})
  - Water: 0 sq mi (0.00 km^{2})
- Elevation: 112 ft (34 m)

Population (2020)
  - Total: 1,955
  - Density: 634/sq mi (245/km^{2})
- Time zone: UTC−5 (Eastern (EST))
  - Summer (DST): UTC−4 (EDT)
- ZIP codes: 23890-23891
- Area code: 804
- FIPS code: 51-83600
- GNIS feature ID: 1500286
- Website: Official website

Waverly is an incorporated town in Sussex County, Virginia, United States. Per the 2020 census, the population was 1,955.

== History ==
Popular legend has it that William Mahone (1826–1895), builder of the Norfolk and Petersburg Railroad (now Norfolk Southern), and his cultured wife, Otelia Butler Mahone (1837–1911), traveled along the newly completed Norfolk and Petersburg Railroad naming stations. Otelia was reading Ivanhoe, a book written by Sir Walter Scott. From his historical Scottish novels, Otelia chose the place names of Waverly, as well as Windsor and Wakefield. She tapped the Scottish Clan "McIvor" for the name of Ivor, a small town in neighboring Southampton County. When they could not agree, it is said that they invented a new name in honor of their dispute, which is how the tiny community of Disputanta a few miles west of Waverly was named. The N&P railroad was completed in 1858.

William Mahone became a Major General in the Confederate Army during the American Civil War, and later, a Senator in the United States Congress. A large portion of U.S. Route 460 between Petersburg and Suffolk is named in his honor.

Waverly is the second largest of the towns Gen. Mahone founded. Waverly has supplied the most state senators and delegate members to the Virginia General Assembly of any Virginia town under 3,000 people. They are Junius Edgar West, Delegate (1910–1912) and Senator (1912–1918); Thomas H. Howerton, Delegate (1912–1914); William O. Rogers, Senator (1924–1934); Garland "Peck" Gray, Senator (1942–1945 and 1948–1971); and Elmon T. Gray, Senator (1971–1992).

The Miles B. Carpenter House, Hunting Quarter, and Waverly Downtown Historic District are listed on the National Register of Historic Places.

One of the last lynchings in Virginia happened in Waverly in 1925, when a black man was arrested for allegedly attacking a married white woman and stealing a pistol belonging to her husband. An armed mob of approximately 500 descended on the jail, seized the man, and then strung him up a tree, shot him, and burned him. The following day, Governor E. Lee Trinkle arrived in Waverly and admonished citizens. Negative publicity surrounding the event and the lynching of another black man in Wytheville, Virginia in 1926, led to anti-lynching legislation.

On February 24, 2016, an EF1 tornado moved directly through Waverly, killing three, as verified by the Virginia Department of Game and Inland Fisheries. The storm also caused significant damage to the town, destroying mobile homes, and damaging homes, businesses, trees, and power poles and lines. This was all part of a massive storm system that moved rapidly across the region.

== Geography ==
According to the United States Census Bureau, the town has a total area of 3.1 square miles (8.0 km^{2}), all land.

== Demographics ==
Historical population
Census	Pop.	Note	%±
1880	170		—
1900	493		—
1910	1,064		115.8%
1920	1,306		22.7%
1930	1,355		3.8%
1940	1,288		−4.9%
1950	1,502		16.6%
1960	1,601		6.6%
1970	1,717		7.2%
1980	2,284		33.0%
1990	2,223		−2.7%
2000	2,309		3.9%
2010	2,149		−6.9%
2020	1,955		−9.0%
U.S. Decennial Census; 2010 2020

=== Racial and ethnic composition ===
Waverly town, Virginia – Racial and ethnic composition Note: the US Census treats Hispanic/Latino as an ethnic category. This table excludes Latinos from the racial categories and assigns them to a separate category. Hispanics/Latinos may be of any race.
Race / Ethnicity (NH = Non-Hispanic)	Pop 2000	Pop 2010	Pop 2020	% 2000	% 2010	% 2020
White alone (NH)	841	640	524	36.42%	29.78%	26.80%
Black or African American alone (NH)	1,421	1,390	1,310	61.54%	64.68%	67.01%
Native American or Alaska Native alone (NH)	3	1	5	0.13%	0.05%	0.26%
Asian alone (NH)	1	11	0	0.04%	0.51%	0.00%
Native Hawaiian or Pacific Islander alone (NH)	0	0	4	0.00%	0.00%	0.20%
Other race alone (NH)	0	1	5	0.00%	0.05%	0.26%
Mixed race or Multiracial (NH)	16	23	55	0.69%	1.07%	2.81%
Hispanic or Latino (any race)	27	83	52	1.17%	3.86%	2.66%
Total	2,309	2,149	1,955	100.00%	100.00%	100.00%

=== 2020 census ===
As of the 2020 census, Waverly had a population of 1,955. The median age was 46.3 years. 19.6% of residents were under the age of 18 and 22.0% of residents were 65 years of age or older. For every 100 females there were 83.4 males, and for every 100 females age 18 and over there were 78.3 males age 18 and over.

0.0% of residents lived in urban areas, while 100.0% lived in rural areas.

There were 813 households in Waverly, of which 27.1% had children under the age of 18 living in them. Of all households, 32.1% were married-couple households, 19.7% were households with a male householder and no spouse or partner present, and 41.0% were households with a female householder and no spouse or partner present. About 32.7% of all households were made up of individuals and 15.8% had someone living alone who was 65 years of age or older.

There were 929 housing units, of which 12.5% were vacant. The homeowner vacancy rate was 2.0% and the rental vacancy rate was 8.8%.

=== 2010 census ===
As of the 2010 United States census, there were 2,149 people living in the town. The racial makeup of the town was 64.7% Black, 29.8% White, 0.0% Native American, 0.5% Asian, 0.0% from some other race and 1.1% from two or more races. 3.9% were Hispanic or Latino of any race.

=== 2000 census ===
As of the census of 2000, there were 2,309 people, 880 households, and 570 families living in the town. The population density was 752.6 people per square mile (290.4/km^{2}). There were 960 housing units at an average density of 312.9 per square mile (120.7/km^{2}). The racial makeup of the town was 36.73% White, 61.76% African American, 0.13% Native American, 0.04% Asian, 0.48% from other races, and 0.87% from two or more races. Hispanic or Latino of any race were 1.17% of the population.

There were 880 households, out of which 29.8% had children under the age of 18 living with them, 40.1% were married couples living together, 20.7% had a female householder with no husband present, and 35.2% were non-families. 31.0% of all households were made up of individuals, and 12.7% had someone living alone who was 65 years of age or older. The average household size was 2.47 and the average family size was 3.09.

In the town, the population was spread out, with 25.4% under the age of 18, 6.0% from 18 to 24, 26.6% from 25 to 44, 23.4% from 45 to 64, and 18.6% who were 65 years of age or older. The median age was 40 years. For every 100 females, there were 88.2 males. For every 100 females age 18 and over, there were 80.4 males.

The median income for a household in the town was $33,698, and the median income for a family was $39,792. Males had a median income of $27,414 versus $21,279 for females. The per capita income for the town was $14,848. About 11.7% of families and 15.7% of the population were below the poverty line, including 21.4% of those under age 18 and 17.7% of those age 65 or over.

== Notable people ==
- Garland Gray (1902–1977), banker, farmer, and sawmill owner who served in the Virginia Senate from 1940s until the 1970s.
- Elmon T. Gray (1925–2011), lumberman, real estate developer, and philanthropist who served in the Virginia Senate from the 1970s to the 1990s.
- Shirley MacLaine, lived here as a young child when her father, Ira Beaty, was briefly the local school's principal.
- Warren Beatty, lived here a young child when his father, Ira Beatty, was briefly the local school's principal.
- Miles B. Carpenter, Noted American folk artist.
