= Sussex County, Virginia =

County in Virginia, United States

- County
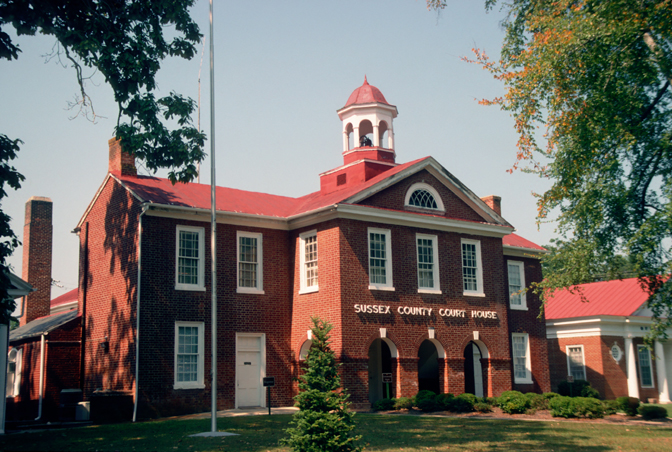
- Sussex County Courthouse

- Location within the U.S. state of Virginia
- Coordinates: 36°56′N 77°16′W
- Country: United States
- State: Virginia
- Founded: 1754
- Named for: Sussex, England
- Seat: Sussex
- Largest town: Waverly

Area
  - Total: 493 sq mi (1,280 km^{2})
  - Land: 490 sq mi (1,300 km^{2})
  - Water: 2.6 sq mi (6.7 km^{2}) 0.5%

Population (2020)
  - Total: 10,829
  - Estimate (2025): 10,755 ▼
  - Density: 22/sq mi (8.5/km^{2})
- Time zone: UTC−5 (Eastern)
  - Summer (DST): UTC−4 (EDT)
- Congressional district: 4th
- Website: www.sussexcountyva.gov

Sussex County is a rural county located in the southeast of the Commonwealth of Virginia. As of the 2020 census, the population was 10,829. Its county seat is Sussex. It was formed in 1754 from Surry County. The county is named after the county of Sussex, England.

Sussex County is included in the Greater Richmond Region.

== History ==
Native Americans may have settled near Cactus Hill along the Nottoway River as long as 10,000 years ago. This area later was organized by English colonists as Sussex County. The historic Nottoway people, although they spoke an Iroquoian language, were loosely part of the Powhatan Confederacy. It was composed mainly of Algonquian-speaking peoples from the coastal zone.

When colonists arrived from England in 1607, some traveled along the Nottoway River. But when they established the first counties in the colony, James City County included both sides of the James River to the North Carolina line. The south side of the James River later was organized as Surry County in 1652. Virginia's General Assembly formed Sussex County in 1754 from the southwestern end of Surry County.

Sussex County has maintained a predominantly agricultural economy, once based in tobacco and cotton commodity crops, with work primarily done by enslaved African Americans. It has preserved some of its historic heritage for centuries. Important sites include the Nottoway Archeological Site, Sussex County Courthouse Historic District and the Waverly Downtown Historic District, and six historic homes, all listed on the National Register of Historic Places.

The largest forest fire in Virginia's recorded history occurred on April 5, 1943, destroying more than 12,000 acres in six hours. Fire were usually fought by recruiting workmen from Gray Lumber Company, but the mill was closed and most were attending the funeral of Ella Darden Gray, matriarch of one of the county's leading families. Her son Senator Garland Gray helped bring attention to the state's need for more protection for valuable forests.

About a decade later, Senator Gray became a leader in the Massive Resistance of whites against desegregating Virginia's public schools.

== Geography ==
According to the U.S. Census Bureau, the county has a total area of 493 square miles (1,280 km^{2}), of which 490 square miles (1,300 km^{2}) is land and 2.6 square miles (6.7 km^{2}) (0.5%) is water.

=== Adjacent counties ===
- Dinwiddie County - northwest
- Prince George County - north
- Surry County - northeast
- Southampton County - southeast
- Greensville County - southwest

=== Major highways ===
- I-95, the major north–south highway on the Eastern Seaboard, enters Sussex County from Greensville County. Access to the county is available at Exits 17, 20, 24, 31, and 33 before the road crosses the Sussex-Prince George County Line.
- US 301, this was the principal south–north route Sussex County until it was supplanted by I-95. A spur of US Route 1, it enters Sussex County from Greensville County, serves mainly as a frontage road along I-95, and leaves at Prince George County south of Carson.
- US 460, a major west-to-east corridor that has a brief southeastern run in the northeastern section of Sussex County, as a connecting route between the Central Appalachian Mountains and the Hampton Roads area. A spur of US 60, it enters Sussex County from Disputanta in Prince George County, serves the communities of Waverly and Wakefield before leaving the county at Southampton County, northwest of Ivor.
- SR 31, a south–north state road that runs northeast from US 460 along East Main Street, then turns north onto Birch Island Road into Surry County towards the Jamestown-Scotland Ferry and Williamsburg.
- SR 35, a south–north state road that enters the state from North Carolina and the county from the cotton fields of Southampton County. The route runs mainly northwest along Jerusalem Plank Road through the communities of Homeville and Lambs before leaving the county at the Sussex-Prince George County Line.
- SR 40, the west–east state road that runs from Dinwiddie County through Stony Creek, West Hope and Sussex, then enters Surry County after passing through Waverly. A business route of SR 40 exists within Stony Creek.
- SR 139, a local west–east state route in Jarratt running northeast along South Allen Road, then turns southeast along Jarratt Avenue both in Sussex and Greensville Counties, the latter of which is where it ends at US 301.

== Demographics ==
Historical population
Census	Pop.	Note	%±
1790	10,549		—
1800	11,062		4.9%
1810	11,362		2.7%
1820	11,884		4.6%
1830	12,720		7.0%
1840	11,229		−11.7%
1850	9,820		−12.5%
1860	10,175		3.6%
1870	7,885		−22.5%
1880	10,062		27.6%
1890	11,100		10.3%
1900	12,082		8.8%
1910	13,664		13.1%
1920	12,834		−6.1%
1930	12,100		−5.7%
1940	12,485		3.2%
1950	12,785		2.4%
1960	12,411		−2.9%
1970	11,464		−7.6%
1980	10,874		−5.1%
1990	10,248		−5.8%
2000	12,504		22.0%
2010	12,087		−3.3%
2020	10,829		−10.4%
2025 (est.)	10,755	▼	−0.7%
U.S. Decennial Census; 1790-1960 1900-1990; 1990-2000 2010 2020

=== Racial and ethnic composition ===
Sussex County, Virginia – Racial and ethnic composition Note: the US Census treats Hispanic/Latino as an ethnic category. This table excludes Latinos from the racial categories and assigns them to a separate category. Hispanics/Latinos may be of any race.
Race / Ethnicity (NH = Non-Hispanic)	Pop 1980	Pop 1990	Pop 2000	Pop 2010	Pop 2020	% 1980	% 1990	% 2000	% 2010	% 2020
White alone (NH)	4,222	4,244	4,537	4,663	4,381	38.83%	41.41%	36.28%	38.58%	40.46%
Black or African American alone (NH)	6,465	5,951	7,750	6,996	5,766	59.45%	58.07%	61.98%	57.88%	53.25%
Native American or Alaska Native alone (NH)	1	11	16	19	14	0.01%	0.11%	0.13%	0.16%	0.13%
Asian alone (NH)	4	16	15	46	11	0.04%	0.16%	0.12%	0.38%	0.10%
Native Hawaiian or Pacific Islander alone (NH)	x	x	1	0	7	x	x	0.01%	0.00%	0.06%
Other race alone (NH)	0	3	5	9	25	0.00%	0.03%	0.04%	0.07%	0.23%
Mixed race or Multiracial (NH)	x	x	78	86	319	x	x	0.62%	0.71%	2.95%
Hispanic or Latino (any race)	182	23	102	268	306	1.67%	0.22%	0.82%	2.22%	2.83%
Total	10,874	10,248	12,504	12,087	10,829	100.00%	100.00%	100.00%	100.00%	100.00%

=== 2020 census ===
As of the 2020 census, the county had a population of 10,829. The median age was 44.4 years. 14.9% of residents were under the age of 18 and 19.6% of residents were 65 years of age or older. For every 100 females there were 135.3 males, and for every 100 females age 18 and over there were 141.9 males age 18 and over.

The racial makeup of the county (including residents of Hispanic or Latino origin) was 41.6% White, 53.4% Black or African American, 0.2% American Indian and Alaska Native, 0.1% Asian, 0.1% Native Hawaiian and Pacific Islander, 0.9% from some other race, and 3.8% from two or more races. Hispanic or Latino residents of any race comprised 2.8% of the population.

0.0% of residents lived in urban areas, while 100.0% lived in rural areas.

There were 3,878 households in the county, of which 23.8% had children under the age of 18 living with them and 34.1% had a female householder with no spouse or partner present. About 32.9% of all households were made up of individuals and 16.0% had someone living alone who was 65 years of age or older.

There were 4,636 housing units, of which 16.4% were vacant. Among occupied housing units, 68.0% were owner-occupied and 32.0% were renter-occupied. The homeowner vacancy rate was 1.8% and the rental vacancy rate was 8.2%.

=== 2010 Census ===
As of the 2010 United States census, there were 12,087 people living in the county, of which 58.1% were Black or African American, 39.3% White, 0.4% Asian, 0.2% Native American, 1.3% of some other race and 0.8% of two or more races. 2.2% were Hispanic or Latino (of any race).

As of the census of 2000, there were 12,504 people, 4,126 households, and 2,809 families living in the county. The population density was 26 people per square mile (10 people/km^{2}). There were 4,653 housing units at an average density of 10 units per square mile (3.9 units/km^{2}). The racial makeup of the county was 62.13% Black or African American, 36.39% White, 0.13% Native American, 0.12% Asian, 0.02% Pacific Islander, 0.54% from other races, and 0.67% from two or more races. 0.82% of the population were Hispanic or Latino of any race.

There were 4,126 households, out of which 28.50% had children under the age of 18 living with them, 45.00% were married couples living together, 18.90% had a female householder with no husband present, and 31.90% were non-families. 28.20% of all households were made up of individuals, and 12.40% had someone living alone who was 65 years of age or older. The average household size was 2.41 and the average family size was 2.94.

In the county, the population was spread out, with 19.60% under the age of 18, 9.00% from 18 to 24, 34.40% from 25 to 44, 23.60% from 45 to 64, and 13.40% who were 65 years of age or older. The median age was 38 years. For every 100 females there were 135.10 males. For every 100 females age 18 and over, there were 142.30 males.

The median income for a household in the county was $31,007, and the median income for a family was $36,739. Males had a median income of $29,307 versus $22,001 for females. The per capita income for the county was $14,670. About 12.80% of families and 16.10% of the population were below the poverty line, including 24.30% of those under age 18 and 19.20% of those age 65 or over.

Two prisons were built in Sussex County in the 1990s. Including the prisons, Sussex County was the fastest growing county in the United States. Excluding the prisons, the county population declined.

== Education ==
Sussex County Public Schools operates public schools for the entire county.

Blackwater Regional Library is the regional library system that provides services to the citizens of Sussex.

=== High school ===
- Sussex Central High School

=== Middle school ===
- Sussex Central Middle School

=== Elementary schools ===
- Sussex Central Elementary School
- Agnes Helena Jones Elementary School (Formerly, from 1965-?)

=== Charter/tech ===
- Appomattox Regional Governor's School for the Arts And Technology
- Rowanty Technical Center

=== Private schools ===
- Tidewater Academy
- Yale Seventh-day Adventist School

== Government and infrastructure ==
The Virginia Department of Corrections operates the Sussex I State Prison and the Sussex II State Prison in unincorporated Sussex County, near Waverly. The Sussex I center housed the male death row. On August 3, 1998, the male death row moved to Sussex I from the Mecklenburg Correctional Center.

=== Politics ===
The county is majority-Black, and has consistently voted for the Democratic Party in presidential elections since 1976. Since the Obama era, the county has seen rightward trends in every election, with Donald Trump only losing the county by 217 votes in 2024; this was the strongest Republican performance since Nixon carried the county in his 1972 landslide election.

United States presidential election results for Sussex County, Virginia
Year	Republican		Democratic		Third party(ies)	
Year	No.	%	No.	%	No.	%
1912	59	10.52%	435	77.54%	67	11.94%
1916	96	16.35%	486	82.79%	5	0.85%
1920	166	23.15%	548	76.43%	3	0.42%
1924	132	17.67%	607	81.26%	8	1.07%
1928	385	41.31%	547	58.69%	0	0.00%
1932	122	14.79%	688	83.39%	15	1.82%
1936	126	12.52%	880	87.48%	0	0.00%
1940	164	18.16%	737	81.62%	2	0.22%
1944	201	20.51%	773	78.88%	6	0.61%
1948	244	20.00%	614	50.33%	362	29.67%
1952	888	47.97%	956	51.65%	7	0.38%
1956	785	39.31%	851	42.61%	361	18.08%
1960	713	35.78%	1,253	62.87%	27	1.35%
1964	1,537	55.39%	1,234	44.47%	4	0.14%
1968	1,105	29.12%	1,541	40.62%	1,148	30.26%
1972	2,120	54.99%	1,645	42.67%	90	2.33%
1976	1,360	33.22%	2,497	60.99%	237	5.79%
1980	1,664	38.94%	2,447	57.27%	162	3.79%
1984	2,183	46.14%	2,408	50.90%	140	2.96%
1988	1,822	46.77%	1,958	50.26%	116	2.98%
1992	1,527	35.90%	2,193	51.56%	533	12.53%
1996	1,378	36.34%	2,089	55.09%	325	8.57%
2000	1,745	44.67%	2,006	51.36%	155	3.97%
2004	1,890	43.50%	2,420	55.70%	35	0.81%
2008	2,026	37.78%	3,301	61.55%	36	0.67%
2012	2,021	37.15%	3,358	61.73%	61	1.12%
2016	2,055	40.74%	2,879	57.08%	110	2.18%
2020	2,219	43.61%	2,827	55.56%	42	0.83%
2024	2,322	47.39%	2,539	51.82%	39	0.80%

== Communities ==
=== Towns ===
- Jarratt
- Stony Creek
- Wakefield
- Waverly

=== Census-designated place ===
- Sussex

=== Unincorporated community ===
- Yale

== See also ==
- National Register of Historic Places listings in Sussex County, Virginia
