= National Register of Historic Places listings in Southampton County, Virginia =

Location of Southampton County in Virginia

This is a list of the National Register of Historic Places listings in Southampton County, Virginia.

This is intended to be a complete list of the properties and districts on the National Register of Historic Places in Southampton County, Virginia, United States. The locations of National Register properties and districts for which the latitude and longitude coordinates are included below, may be seen in an online map.

There are 19 properties and districts listed on the National Register in the county.

This National Park Service list is complete through NPS recent listings posted January 2, 2026.

== Current listings ==
	Name on the Register	Image	Date listed	Location	City or town	Description
1	Aspen Lawn	Aspen Lawn	April 1, 2002 (#02000319)	4438 Hicksford Rd. 36°40′45″N 77°25′48″W	Drewryville	
2	Beaton-Powell House	Beaton-Powell House	November 14, 2008 (#08001058)	32142 S. Main St. 36°35′00″N 77°12′02″W	Boykins	
3	Beechwood	Beechwood	February 1, 1979 (#79003088)	Northeast of Courtland on Bethel Rd. 36°45′11″N 77°00′05″W	Beales	
4	Belmont	Belmont	October 3, 1973 (#73002061)	Northeast of Capron off Buckhorn Quarter Rd. 36°43′39″N 77°10′08″W	Capron	
5	Brown's Ferry	Brown's Ferry	June 18, 1979 (#79003090)	East of Drakes Corner off Monroe Rd. 36°36′38″N 77°00′04″W	Drakes Corner	
6	Courtland Historic District	Courtland Historic District	March 19, 2020 (#100005105)	Roughly bounded by North and South Main, Rochelle, Linden, Aurora, and Bateman Sts., and Woodland Park Cir. 36°42′59″N 77°04′06″W	Courtland	
7	Courtland School	Courtland School	August 15, 2016 (#16000539)	25499 Florence St. 36°43′18″N 77°04′01″W	Courtland	
8	Elm Grove	Elm Grove	July 24, 1979 (#79003089)	Northeast of Courtland on Governor Darden Rd. 36°44′39″N 77°01′39″W	Courtland	
9	Fortsville	Fortsville	September 15, 1970 (#70000828)	Southeast of the junction of Grizzard and Fortsville Rds. 36°42′49″N 77°25′08″W	Grizzard	Straddles the border with Sussex County
10	Mahone's Tavern	Mahone's Tavern	May 29, 2008 (#08000483)	22341 Main St. 36°42′51″N 77°04′01″W	Courtland	Childhood home of Confederate General William Mahone
11	Rochelle-Prince House	Rochelle-Prince House	January 7, 2011 (#10001115)	22371 Main St. 36°42′48″N 77°04′00″W	Courtland	James Rochelle was clerk of the Southampton County court during the trial of Nat Turner. His nephew was George Henry Thomas, a Union general in the American Civil War.
12	Rose Hill	Rose Hill	December 31, 1979 (#79003087)	Northeast of Capron on Rose Hill Dr. 36°44′47″N 77°08′01″W	Capron	
13	Rotherwood		September 12, 2023 (#100008835)	15410 Southampton Pkwy. 36°42′05″N 77°14′22″W	Capron	
14	Sebrell Rural Historic District	Sebrell Rural Historic District	August 27, 2013 (#13000648)	Roughly bounded by the Nottoway River, the Assamoosick Swamp, and Old Hickory Rd. 36°47′07″N 77°07′34″W	Sebrell	
15	Simmons-Sebrell-Camp House	Simmons-Sebrell-Camp House	October 23, 2003 (#03001097)	17123 Carys Bridge Rd. 36°47′21″N 77°08′03″W	Courtland	
16	Sunnyside	Sunnyside	July 8, 1982 (#82004596)	Grays Shop Rd. 36°38′37″N 77°08′36″W	Newsoms	
17	Rebecca Vaughan House	Rebecca Vaughan House	March 22, 2006 (#06000162)	26315 Heritage Ln. 36°42′39″N 77°03′27″W	Courtland	The last house in which anyone was killed during the Southampton Insurrection of 1831
18	William H. Vincent House	William H. Vincent House	January 16, 2004 (#03001444)	23016 Main St. 36°42′38″N 77°12′02″W	Capron	
19	Millie Woodson-Turner Home Site		April 26, 2021 (#100006436)	Approx. 570 feet (170 m) west of jct. of Indian Town and Cobb Pond Rds. 36°43′33″N 77°06′19″W	Capron vicinity	

== See also ==
- List of National Historic Landmarks in Virginia
- National Register of Historic Places listings in Virginia
