= Elm Grove =

Elm Grove may refer to:

== United States ==
- Elm Grove (town), Kansas
- Elm Grove, Kentucky, a community
- Elm Grove, Louisiana, a community
- Elm Grove, Missouri, an early starting point of the Oregon Trail
- Elm Grove, Oklahoma, a census-designated place
- Elm Grove, Texas (disambiguation), the name of several populated places in this state
- Elm Grove (Courtland, Virginia), a historic plantation
- Elm Grove, West Virginia, a neighborhood of Wheeling
- Elm Grove (Southside, West Virginia), a historic site
- Elm Grove, Wisconsin, a village

== Elsewhere ==
- Elm Grove, Brighton, an area of the city of Brighton and Hove, England

== See also ==
- Elm Grove Township (disambiguation)
