= Courtland School (Courtland, Virginia) =

- U.S. National Register of Historic Places
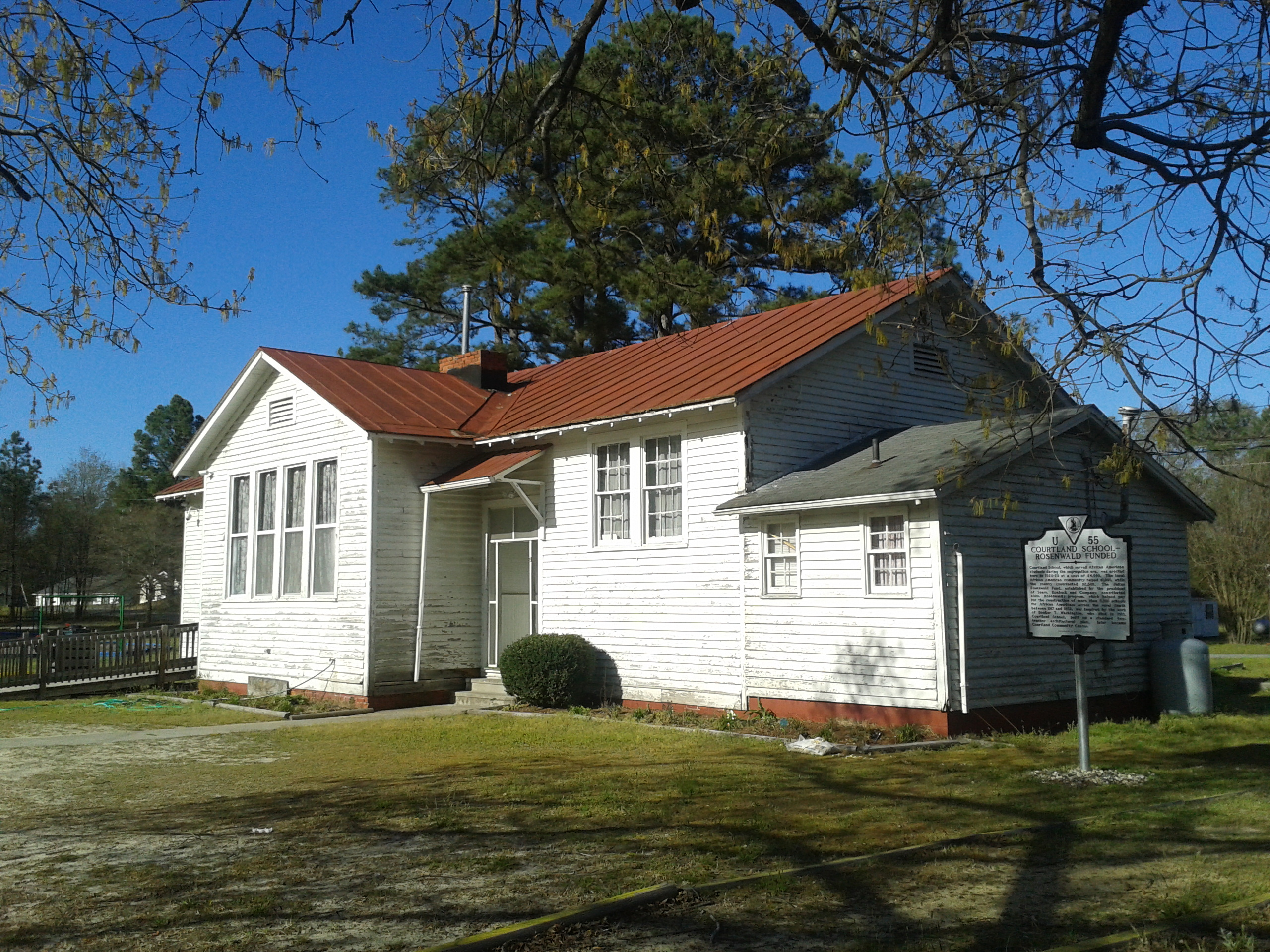

- Location within Virginia Location within the United States
- Location: 25499 Florence St., Courtland, Virginia
- Coordinates: 36.72174°N 77.06713°W
- Area: 3.27 acres (1.32 ha)
- Built: c. 1928
- Architectural style: Federal
- NRHP reference No.: 16000539
- Added to NRHP: August 15, 2016

The Courtland School is a historic Rosenwald school at 25499 Florence Street in Courtland, Virginia. It is a single-story clapboarded wood-frame structure, built to a standard two-teacher plan developed by the Rosenwald Fund for such buildings. It is covered by a bracketed metal gable roof, and has modest Craftsman styling. It was built in 1928, and served as a segregated school for area African-American students until 1963. It was then purchased by a community group for use as a community center.

The building was listed on the National Register of Historic Places in 2016.

== See also ==
- National Register of Historic Places listings in Southampton County, Virginia
