= Mahone's Tavern =

Historic commercial building in Virginia, United States

- U.S. National Register of Historic Places
- Virginia Landmarks Register
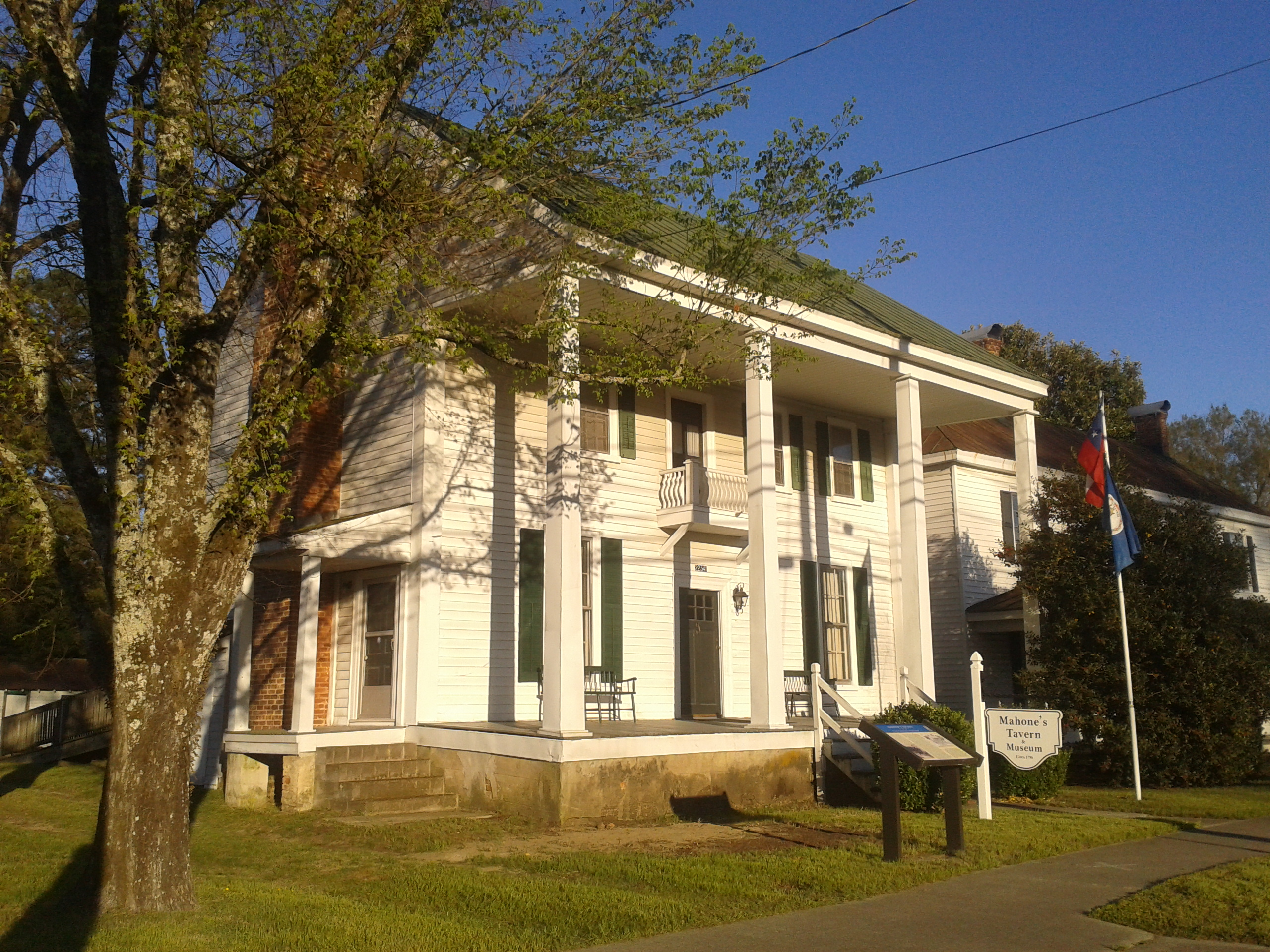
- Mahone's Tavern, April 2017

- Location within Virginia Location within the United States
- Location: 22341 Main St., Courtland, Virginia
- Coordinates: 36.71421°N 77.06696°W
- Area: 1 acre (0.40 ha)
- Built: c. 1796
- Built by: Hunt, Thomas; Adams, Henry
- Architectural style: Federal, I-house
- NRHP reference No.: 08000483
- VLR No.: 201-0001

Significant dates
- Added to NRHP: May 29, 2008
- Designated VLR: March 20, 2008

Mahone's Tavern, also known as Kello's Tavern, Vaughn's Tavern and Howard's Hotel, is a historic inn and tavern located in Courtland, Southampton County, Virginia. It was built about 1796, and is a two-story, three-bay, gable-roofed, wood-framed structure with exterior gable end chimneys. A rebuilt hyphen and kitchen structure were added in 1933.

In 1831, like nearly every standing building in Courtland, or Jerusalem at the time, it became a refuge and gathering place for local citizens during the slave uprising led by Nat Turner, known as Nat Turner's Rebellion. The building was also the boyhood home of two persons who later achieved national prominence: Confederate General William Mahone and John J. Kindred, resident from 1859 to 1869, who later became a U.S. Senator from New York. It ceased being used as a tavern or hotel in 1901.

It was listed on the National Register of Historic Places in 2006.

== See also ==
- National Register of Historic Places listings in Southampton County, Virginia
