= Vincent House =

Vincent House may refer to several buildings in the United States:

- Vincent House (Fort Dodge, Iowa)
- William H. Vincent House, Capron, Virginia
- Vincent House, Chicago, Illinois, in the Burton–Judson Courts dormitory at the University of Chicago
- Vincent House, Edgartown, Massachusetts, on the list of the oldest buildings in Massachusetts
