= Rose Hill (Capron, Virginia) =

Historic house in Virginia, United States

- U.S. National Register of Historic Places
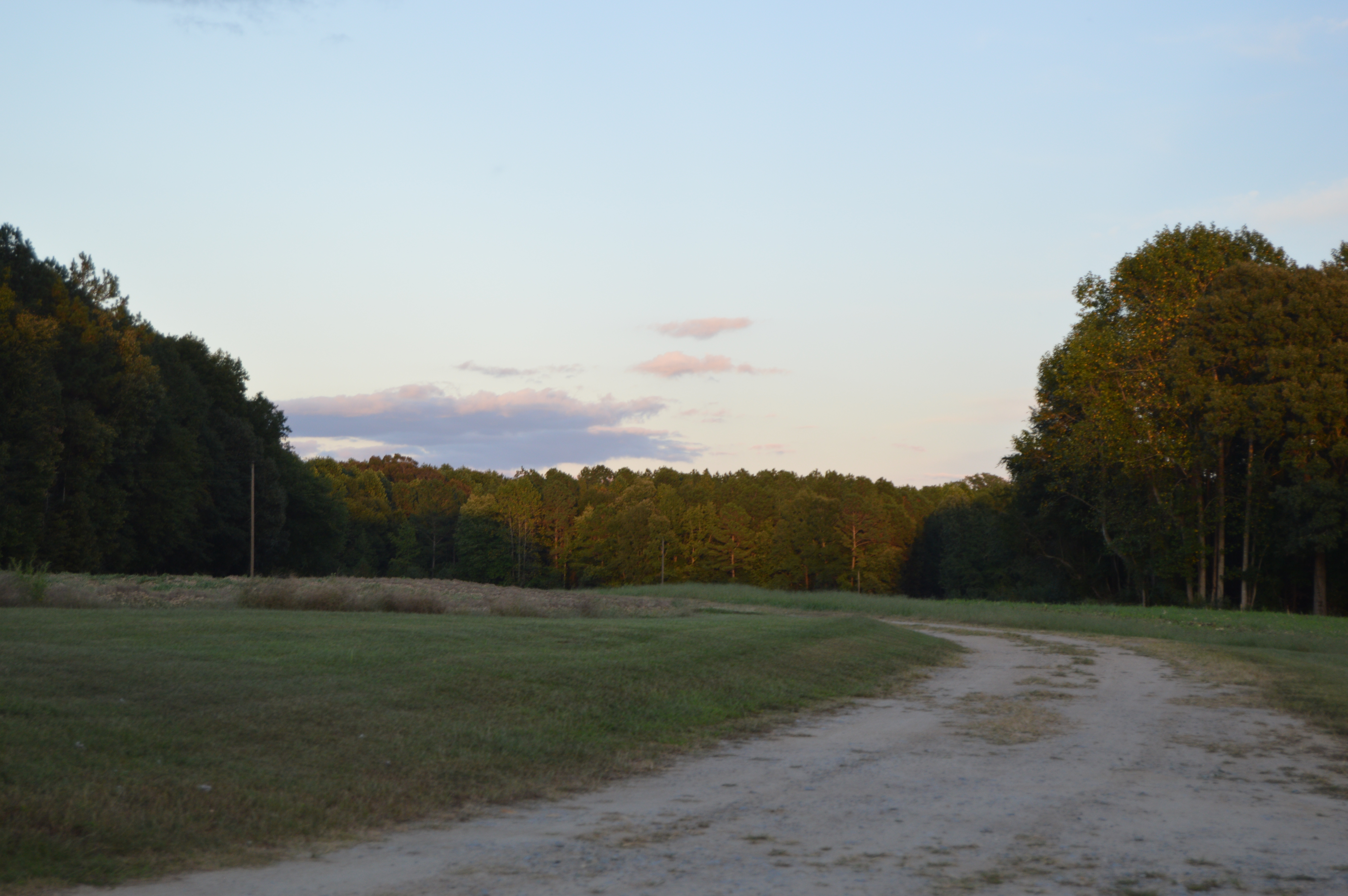
- Entrance to the property

- Location within Virginia Location within the United States
- Nearest city: Capron, Virginia
- Coordinates: 36°44′47″N 77°8′1″W
- Area: 780 acres (320 ha)
- Built: 1805
- NRHP reference No.: 79003087
- Added to NRHP: December 31, 1979

Rose Hill is the location of one of the oldest and least-altered buildings in Southampton County, Virginia, USA. Located near Capron, the Federal style house was built in the early 19th century by Henry Blow, on land his father had acquired from the local Nottoway Indians in 1792. The site is also of archaeological interest, with documented native uses into the 20th century.

After the Civil War, James R. Kello Sr. purchased the property. He resided at the residence with his wife, Mariah Thomas Kello, until his death on May 18, 1908. James and Mariah raised their family in this home. Their descendants still reside there today.

The property was listed on the National Register of Historic Places in 1979.

== See also ==
- National Register of Historic Places listings in Southampton County, Virginia
