= John J. Kindred =

American politician (1864–1937)

John Joseph Kindred
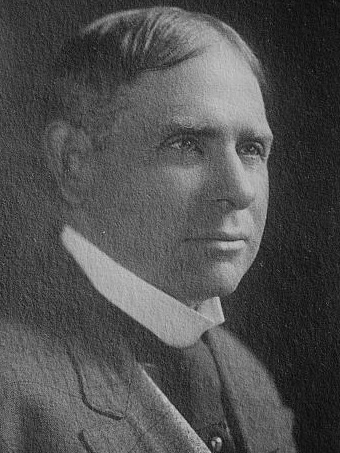
- Kindred circa 1920

Member of the U.S. House of Representatives from New York
- In office March 4, 1911 – March 3, 1913
- Preceded by: William Willett, Jr.
- Succeeded by: Jefferson M. Levy
- Constituency: 14th district
- In office March 4, 1921 – March 3, 1929
- Preceded by: C. Pope Caldwell
- Succeeded by: William F. Brunner
- Constituency: 2nd district

Personal details
- Born: July 15, 1864 Courtland, Virginia, U.S.
- Died: October 23, 1937 (aged 73) Astoria, New York, U.S.
- Resting place: Poughkeepsie Rural Cemetery, Poughkeepsie, New York, U.S.
- Party: Democratic

John Joseph Kindred (July 15, 1864 – October 23, 1937) was an American physician and politician. Kindred served five terms as U.S. Representative from New York from 1911 to 1913, and from 1921 to 1929, before returning to the practice of medicine. As a physician, his focus was on mental diseases, and he established mental hospitals in New York, New Jersey and Connecticut.

== Medical career ==
Born near Courtland, Virginia, Kindred attended the local schools, Randolph-Macon College, Ashland, Virginia, and the University of Virginia.

He taught school in Virginia in 1886 and 1887. His boyhood home at Courtland is known as Mahone's Tavern. He graduated from the Hospital College of Medicine, Louisville, Kentucky, in 1889 and commenced the practice of his profession in New York City the same year. He graduated in mental diseases from the University of Edinburgh, Scotland, in 1892. He established several mental hospitals in Connecticut, New York, and New Jersey.

== Legal career ==
He graduated in law in 1919 and was admitted to the bar in 1926.

== Political career ==
Kindred was elected as a Democrat to the Sixty-second Congress (March 4, 1911 – March 3, 1913). He was not a candidate for renomination in 1912. He became interested in agricultural pursuits and in the construction of houses.

Kindred was elected to the Sixty-seventh and to the three succeeding Congresses (March 4, 1921 – March 3, 1929). He was not a candidate for renomination in 1928.

== Educational career ==
He resumed his medical profession in Manhattan, New York City 1930-1937 and also served as professor of medical jurisprudence at John B. Stetson University, DeLand, Florida, 1933 to 1937.

== Death ==
He died on October 23, 1937, at Astoria, New York, and was interred in Poughkeepsie Rural Cemetery.

U.S. House of Representatives
Preceded by William Willett, Jr.	Member of the U.S. House of Representatives from New York's 14th congressional district 1911–1913	Succeeded by Jefferson M. Levy
Preceded by C. Pope Caldwell	Member of the U.S. House of Representatives from New York's 2nd congressional district 1921–1929	Succeeded by William F. Brunner
