= Simmons–Sebrell–Camp House =

Historic house in Virginia, United States

- U.S. National Register of Historic Places
- Virginia Landmarks Register
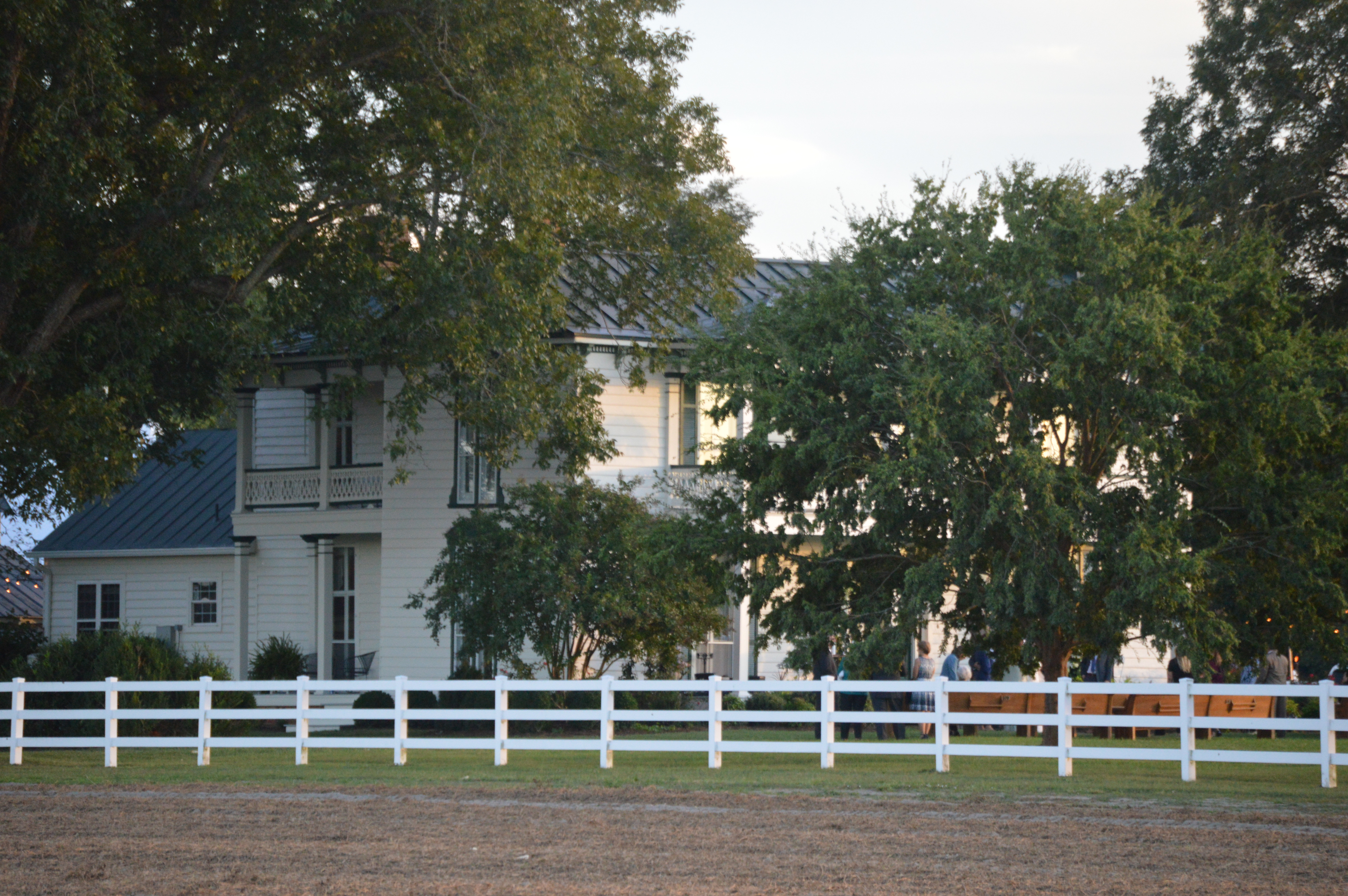
- Front and northeastern side

- Location within Virginia Location within the United States
- Location: 17123 Carys Bridge Road, near Courtland, Virginia
- Coordinates: 36°47′13″N 77°07′52″W
- Area: 54.6 acres (22.1 ha)
- Built: c. 1770, 1858
- Built by: James Edward Sebrell
- Architectural style: Italianate
- NRHP reference No.: 03001097
- VLR No.: 087-5377

Significant dates
- Added to NRHP: October 23, 2003
- Designated VLR: June 18, 2003

Simmons–Sebrell–Camp House, also known as the Zebulon Simmons Tract, is a historic home and farm located near Courtland, Southampton County, Virginia. It was built about 1770, and expanded and modified in 1858. It is a two-story, five-bay, Italianate style frame farmhouse. It features an elaborate two-story porch and rear ell, also with a two-story porch. Also on the property are the contributing former cold storage building or cellar, and three larger-scale agricultural support buildings.

It was listed on the National Register of Historic Places in 2003.
