= William Henry Brodnax =

American politician

Member of the Virginia House of Delegates from Brunswick County

Brigadier General, Delegate
- In office December 6, 1830 – December 1, 1833
- Preceded by: John G. Boisseu
- Succeeded by: John L. Scott

Member of the Virginia House of Delegates from Greensville County
- In office, 1818 – , 1819
- Preceded by: John D. Maclin

Personal details
- Born: c. 1786 Brunswick County, Virginia, U.S.
- Died: October 23, 1834 (aged 53) Kingston plantation, Dinwiddie County, Virginia, U.S.
- Education: Hampden-Sydney College
- Occupation: Soldier, Legislator

William Henry Brodnax (also Broadnax) (c. 1786 – October 23, 1834) was a nineteenth-century Virginia lawyer, planter and politician, possibly most famous for his conduct as Brigadier General of the Virginia militia which suppressed Nat Turner's Rebellion or for his twice unsuccessful proposal for Virginia to send former slaves to Liberia.

== Early life and education ==
Born in Brunswick County, Virginia, to the former Frances Belfield Walker and her lawyer husband William Broadnax. His ancestor William Brodnax, a goldsmith, from Kent County and London had emigrated to the Virginia Colony years earlier. His family included at least one brother, Meriwether Brodnax, who became a lawyer in Southampton County to the southeast. After a local education as befit his class, Broadnax graduated from Hampden-Sydney College. He then studied law in Petersburg. He later received an honorary Master of Arts degree from Hampden Sydney in 1830 at age forty-four following his service as a delegate to the Virginia Constitutional Convention of 1829-1830.

== Career ==
The Virginia Capitol at Richmond VA where 19th century Conventions met

Brodnax began practicing law in Petersburg, Virginia and adjoining Dinwiddie, Brunswick and Greensville counties. He also operated a 1600 acre plantation called "Kingston" using enslaved labor. He was also a member of the American Colonization Society. He owned or had a life interest in more than 100 slaves.

In 1818, voters in Greensville County again refused to re-elect their one-term representatives to the Virginia House of Delegates, so this and William S. Jeffries replaced John D. Maclin and Littleberry R. Robinson from 1818 to 1819, and while Jeffries won re-election, Robert B. Stark replaced this man in that part-time position. In 1829, Brodnax became the largest vote-getter for selection as one of four delegates from the district encompassing Brunswick, Dinwiddie, Lunenberg and Mecklenburg counties to the Convention of 1829-1830, serving alongside George C. Dromgoole, Mark Alexander and William O. Goode. Although the new constitution proposed by that convention reduced Dinwiddie County to one seat, Brodnax won election and twice won re-election as Dinwiddie County's sole delegate 1830–1833. In 1832 during the Virginia legislature's debate about slavery, Brodnax spoke in favor of colonization of free African Americans.

Military service being required in that era for all white males, Brodnax served as an officer and rose to . In On January 24, 1824, the Virginia state legislature appointed him to the rank of Brigadier General and later detailed him to meet General Lafayette on his arrival in Virginia. He served as the chief marshal at Yorktown, Virginia, when Lafayette visited.

Early in his political career, Brodnax was a member of the Whig Party. Broadnax was a presidential elector for losing candidate William Harris Crawford in 1824.

In August 1831, Brodnax served as commanding general of the Brunswick and Greensville county militias which suppressed the Nat Turner's Rebellion in Southampton County, Virginia. The next month he chaired a special committee to consider petitions relating to free blacks and slaves in Virginia society, and while he personally favored a fuller debate, on January 16, 1832 his committee concluded it "inexpedient for the present to make any legislative enactments for the abolition of slavery." One source claims he represented, along with his brother Meriwether Brodnax (a one-term delegate for Southampton County in 1819), several slaves accused of participating in Nat Turner's Rebellion in Sussex County. However, surviving court records fail to support either assertions. His brother Meriwether B. Brodnax (sometimes written Merewether B. Broadnax) was a prosecutor for Southampton County, not a defense counsel. (Meriwether was listed was also defense counsel in Sussex County to the northeast.) He was listed in Sussex County Court records. Gen. Eppes was in command of the troops in the area.

== Personal life ==
Broadnax married Anne Eliza withers, and the couple had four sons and two daughters.

== Death ==
Brodnax died of cholera on October 23, 1834, and was buried in the cemetery at Dinwiddie County Courthouse. His will was probated in Dinwiddie County in December 1834.
