= Belmont (Capron, Virginia) =

Historic house in Virginia, United States

- U.S. National Register of Historic Places
- Virginia Landmarks Register
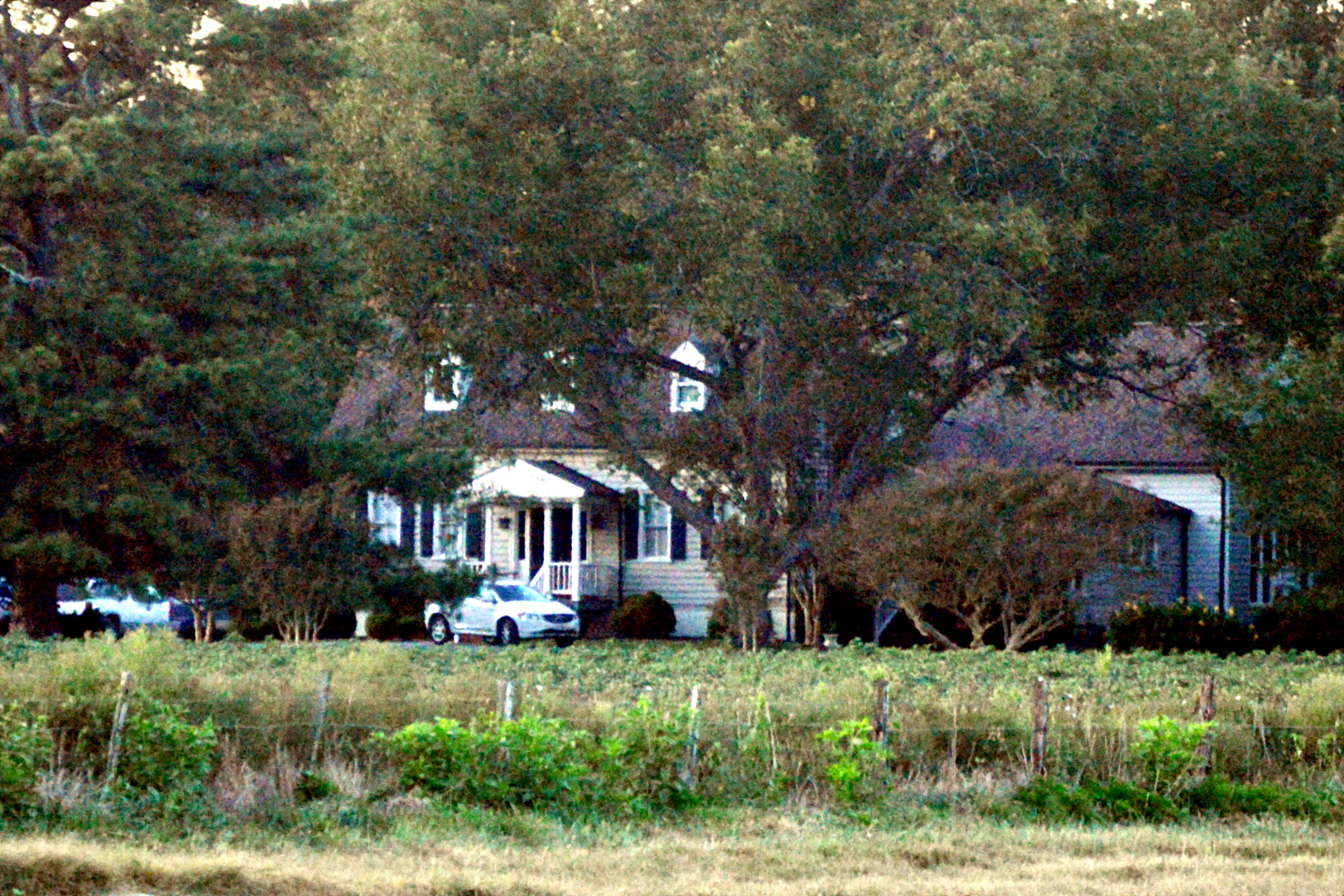
- Roadside view

- Location within Virginia Location within the United States
- Location: Off Buckhorn Quarter Road, northeast of Capron, Virginia
- Coordinates: 36°43′37″N 77°10′17″W
- Area: 145 acres (59 ha)
- Built: c. 1790
- NRHP reference No.: 73002061
- VLR No.: 087-0030

Significant dates
- Added to NRHP: October 3, 1973
- Designated VLR: July 17, 1973

Belmont is a historic plantation where Nat Turner's Rebellion finished. It is located near Capron, Southampton County, Virginia.

== History ==
Belmont’s dwelling house, a typical homeplace of a Southside plantation, was built in the late 18th century for George Carey. It is a 1 1/2-story, frame dwelling sheathed in weatherboard. It has a side gable roof with dormers and sits on a brick foundation. It has a single pile, central-hall plan and features a Chinese lattice railing on the second story. Also on the property are a contributing smokehouse and office.

The plantation was acquired by the Blunt family in the early 19th century. There, on the morning of August 23, 1831, Nat Turner's slave rebellion was effectively suppressed.

The house at Belmont was rehabilitated in the late 20th century.

It was listed on the National Register of Historic Places in 1973.
