= Elm Grove (Courtland, Virginia) =

Historic house in Virginia, United States

- U.S. National Register of Historic Places
- Virginia Landmarks Register
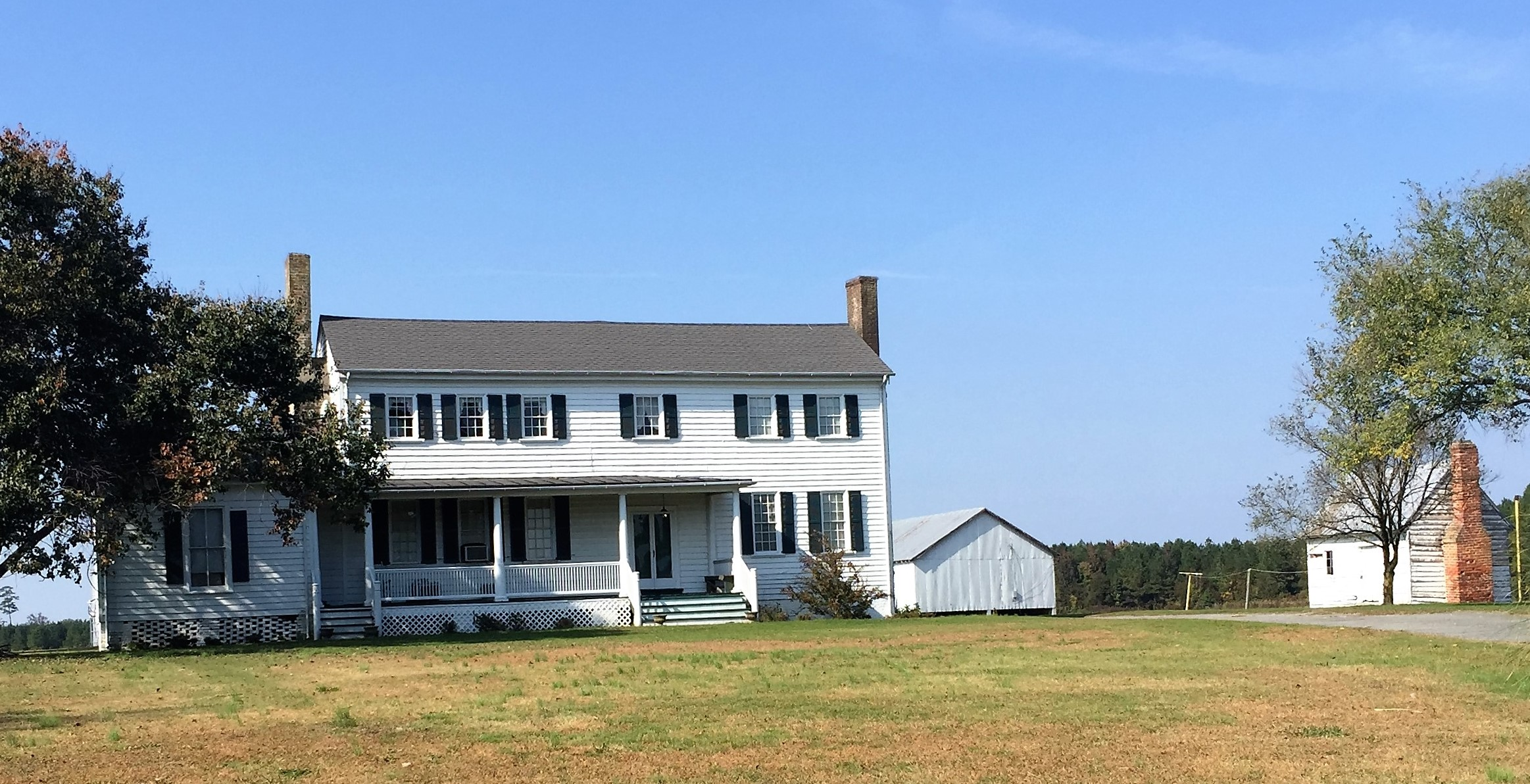

- Location within Virginia Location within the United States
- Location: Northeast of Courtland on VA 646, near Courtland, Virginia
- Coordinates: 36°44′39″N 77°1′41″W
- Area: 2 acres (0.81 ha)
- Built: c. 1790
- NRHP reference No.: 79003089
- VLR No.: 087-0103

Significant dates
- Added to NRHP: July 24, 1979
- Designated VLR: May 15, 1979

Elm Grove, also known as the Williams-Ricks House, is a historic plantation house located near Courtland, Southampton County, Virginia. The original section was built about 1790, and enlarged by its subsequent owners through the 19th century. The main section is a two-story, six-bay, frame dwelling sheathed in weatherboard. It has a side gable roof and exterior end chimneys. Three noteworthy early outbuildings survive. Directly north of the house is a single-story, one-cell frame building probably erected as an office and used at the turn of the century as a school.

West of the house is a frame dairy with a gable roof, beaded weatherboards, and louvred ventilator above the door on the front.

Most interesting is the smokehouse which stands northwest of the house. This low, square building has saddle-notched round log walls and encloses four srnokepits. This is the only known early example of a multiple-pit smokehouse in Virginia.

It was listed on the National Register of Historic Places in 1979.

The tract now known as Elm Grove was left to Isaac Williams by his father, Jonah Williams, in 1771. After Isaac Williams's death in 1788, the property remained in his estate until 1803, when 342 acres of his land were transferred to his son Edwin.

After Edwin Williams's death in 1811, the estate was divided among several heirs, all of whom soon sold their portions to Richard and Oswin Ricks, a father and son.

In 1832 Oswin Ricks sold the property to Dr. Robert Murray, an Irish-born physician. Tradition states that Murray operated a school at Elm Grove at mid-century, a belief substantiated by the 1850 census which lists fourteen girls and two boys (in addition to the Murrays's own six children) residing at the house at that time. Murray sold the property to William W. Briggs in 1858.

In 1887 Lucius Lelius Manry bought Elm Grove. It remained in the Manry family until the death of Edward Smith Manry in 1996.
