= Capron, Virginia =

- Town
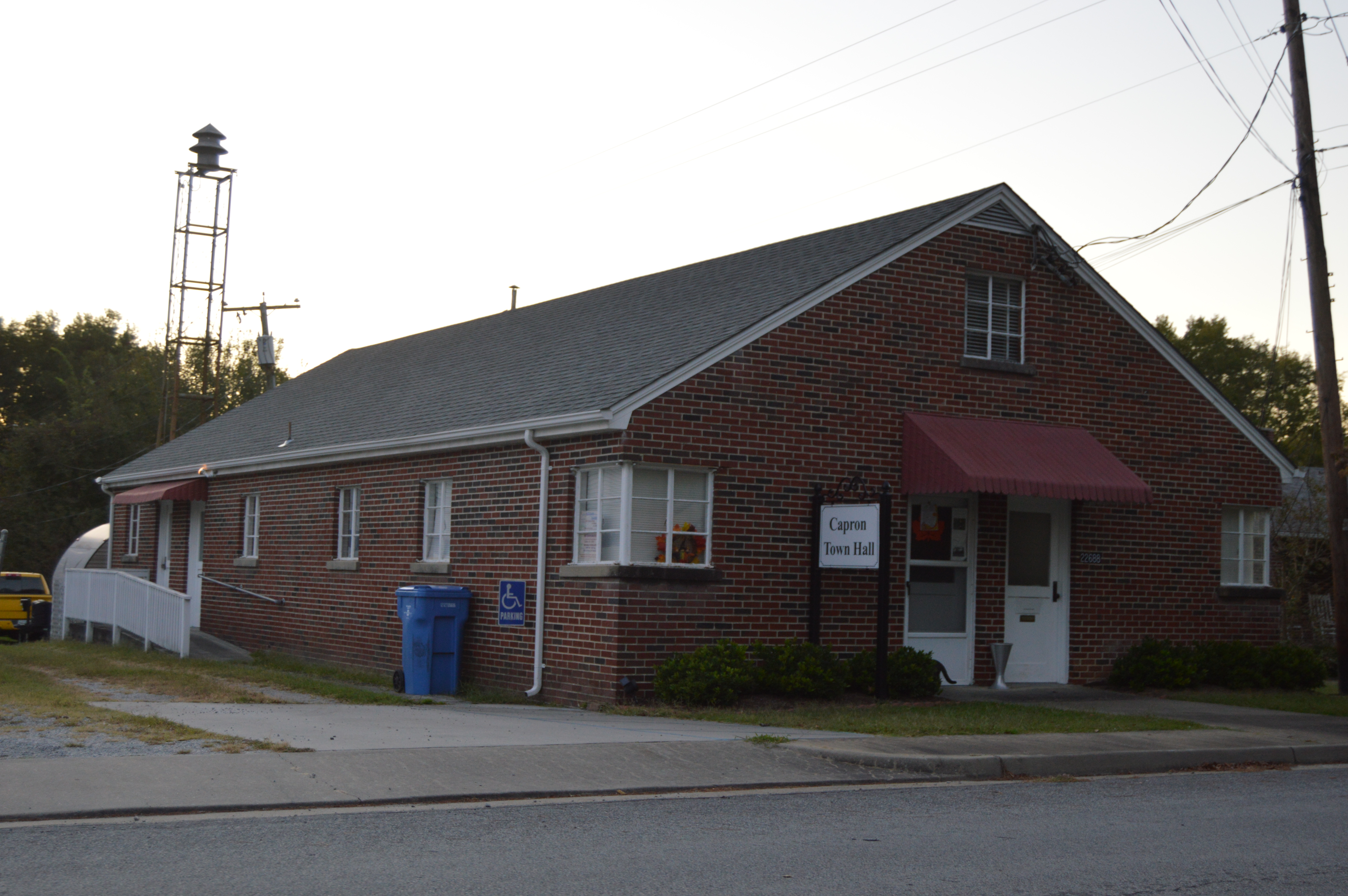
- Town hall

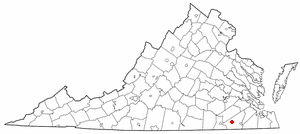
- Location of Capronmap, Virginia
- Coordinates: 36°42′39″N 77°12′6″W
- Country: United States
- State: Virginia
- County: Southampton

Area
  - Total: 0.17 sq mi (0.43 km^{2})
  - Land: 0.17 sq mi (0.43 km^{2})
  - Water: 0 sq mi (0.00 km^{2})
- Elevation: 112 ft (34 m)

Population (2020)
  - Total: 141
  - Density: 854/sq mi (329.9/km^{2})
- Time zone: UTC-5 (Eastern (EST))
  - Summer (DST): UTC-4 (EDT)
- ZIP code: 23829
- Area code: 434
- FIPS code: 51-12904
- GNIS feature ID: 1492710

Capron is a town in Southampton County, Virginia, United States. The population was 141 at the 2020 census.

== History ==
Belmont, Rose Hill, and the William H. Vincent House are listed on the National Register of Historic Places.

== Geography ==
Capron is located at 36°42′39″N 77°12′6″W (36.710770, -77.201726).

According to the United States Census Bureau, the town has a total area of 0.2 square mile (0.4 km^{2}), all land.

== Demographics ==
Historical population
Census	Pop.	Note	%±
1930	337		—
1940	291		−13.6%
1950	281		−3.4%
1960	327		16.4%
1970	314		−4.0%
1980	238		−24.2%
1990	144		−39.5%
2000	167		16.0%
2010	166		−0.6%
2020	141		−15.1%
U.S. Decennial Census

As of the census of 2000, there were 167 people, 72 households, and 45 families living in the town. The population density was 1,036.0 people per square mile (403.0/km^{2}). There were 79 housing units at an average density of 490.1 per square mile (190.6/km^{2}). The racial makeup of the town was 72.46% White and 27.54% African American.

There were 72 households, out of which 26.4% had children under the age of 18 living with them, 48.6% were married couples living together, 11.1% had a female householder with no husband present, and 37.5% were non-families. 36.1% of all households were made up of individuals, and 16.7% had someone living alone who was 65 years of age or older. The average household size was 2.32 and the average family size was 3.04.

In the town, the population was spread out, with 24.0% under the age of 18, 6.0% from 18 to 24, 30.5% from 25 to 44, 23.4% from 45 to 64, and 16.2% who were 65 years of age or older. The median age was 41 years. For every 100 females there were 103.7 males. For every 100 females age 18 and over, there were 95.4 males.

The median income for a household in the town was $45,000, and the median income for a family was $50,833. Males had a median income of $36,750 versus $25,417 for females. The per capita income for the town was $22,588. None of the population or families were below the poverty line.
