= Drewryville, Virginia =

- Unincorporated community
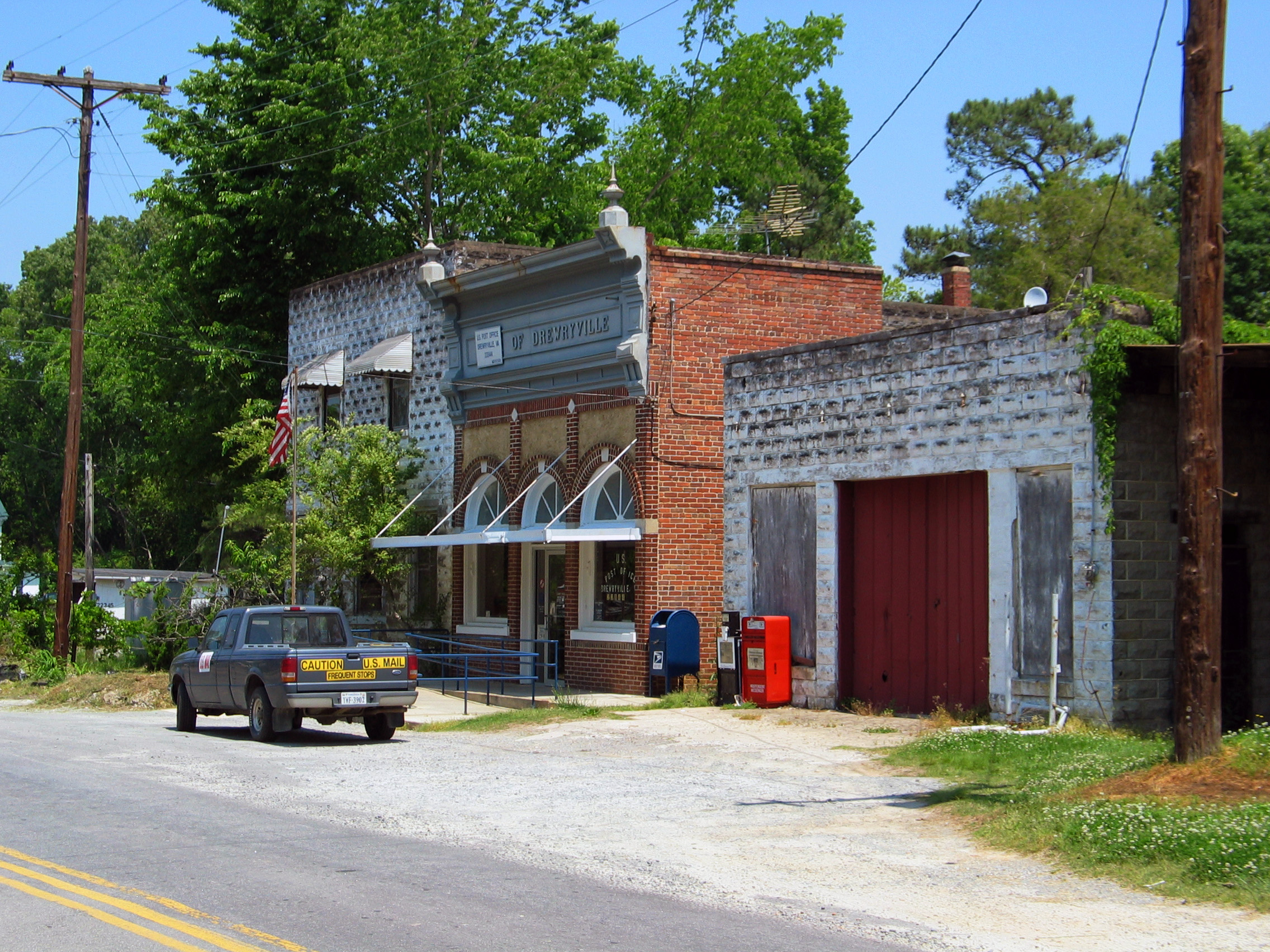
- Downtown Drewryville

- Location within Virginia Location within the United States
- Coordinates: 36°42′57″N 77°18′23″W
- Country: United States
- State: Virginia
- County: Southampton
- Elevation: 98 ft (30 m)
- Time zone: UTC-5 (Eastern (EST))
  - Summer (DST): UTC-4 (EDT)
- ZIP Code: 23844
- Area codes: 757, 948
- GNIS feature ID: 1492881

Drewryville is an unincorporated community in western Southampton County, Virginia, United States, off U.S. Route 58. It lies at an elevation of 98 feet (30 m).

The Aspen Lawn was listed on the National Register of Historic Places in 2002.
