= Rebecca Vaughan House =

Historic house in Virginia, United States

- U.S. National Register of Historic Places
- Virginia Landmarks Register
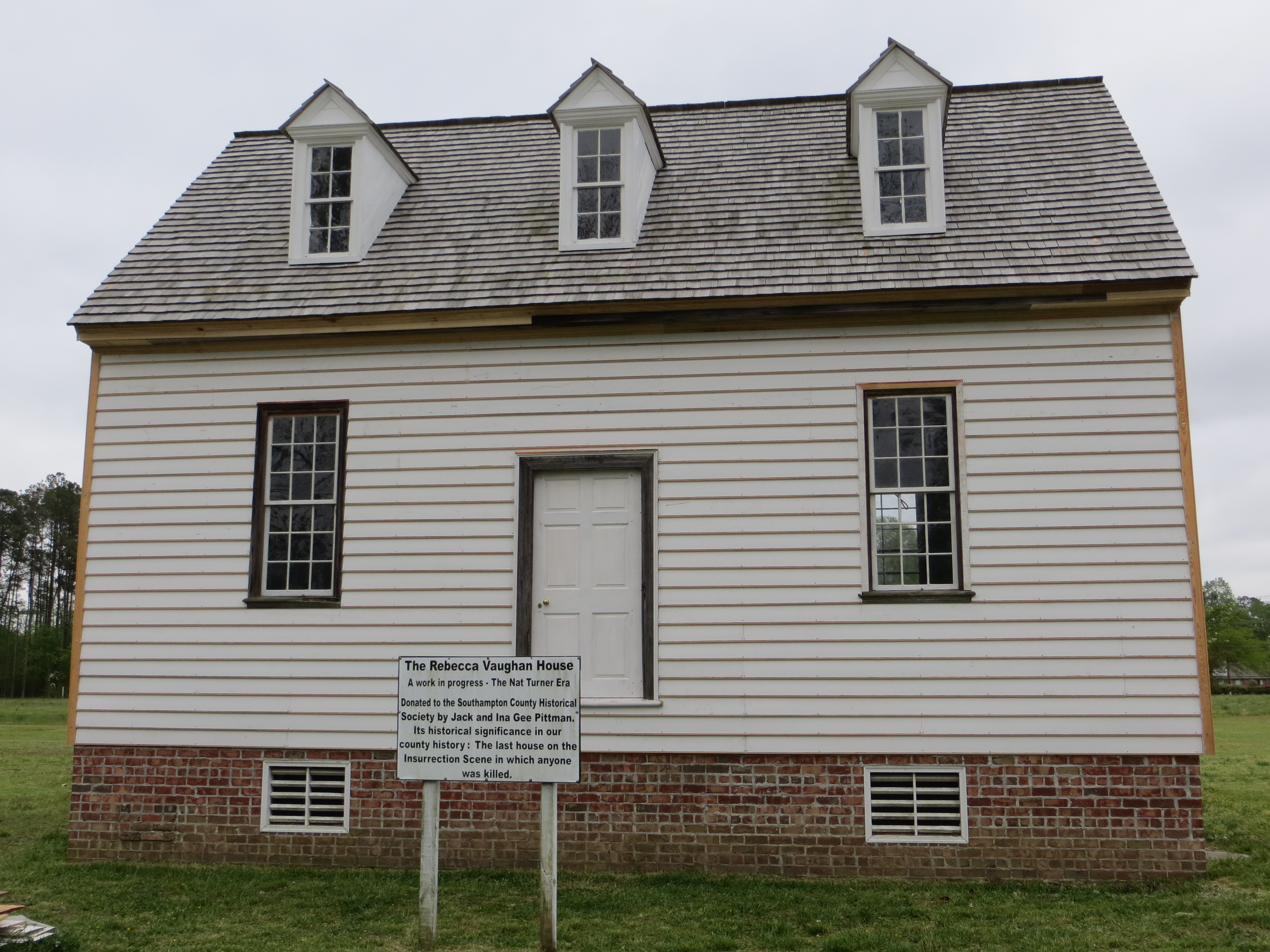
- Rebecca Vaughan House, April 2013

- Location within Virginia Location within the United States
- Location: 26315 Heritage Ln., Courtland, Virginia
- Coordinates: 36°42′39″N 77°3′29″W
- Area: 3.2 acres (1.3 ha)
- Built: c. 1800
- Architectural style: Federal
- NRHP reference No.: 06000162
- VLR No.: 201-5002

Significant dates
- Added to NRHP: March 22, 2006
- Designated VLR: December 7, 2005

Rebecca Vaughan House is a historic home and farm located at Courtland, Southampton County, Virginia. It was built about 1800, and is a 1 1/2-story, three-bay, four room, frame dwelling. It has a pressed metal shingle gable roof with five dormers. The house was moved to its present site in 2004, and is located on the grounds of the Southampton Agriculture & Forestry Museum and Heritage Village, administered by the Southampton County Historical Society. The house was the last house during the Nat Turner's Rebellion of August 21 through 23, 1831, at which Nat Turner and his enslaved followers killed residents during their journey through the southwestern portion of Southampton County. Moved from its original location, the house has been restored.

A brick foundation for the house and for the dairy barn were built in 2015 and the chimneys for the house were restored with period accurate material the same year. The restored chimneys are lined with terra cotta tile to meet modern standards.

It was listed on the National Register of Historic Places in 2006.
