= Sunnyside (Newsoms, Virginia) =

Historic house in Virginia, United States

- U.S. National Register of Historic Places
- Virginia Landmarks Register
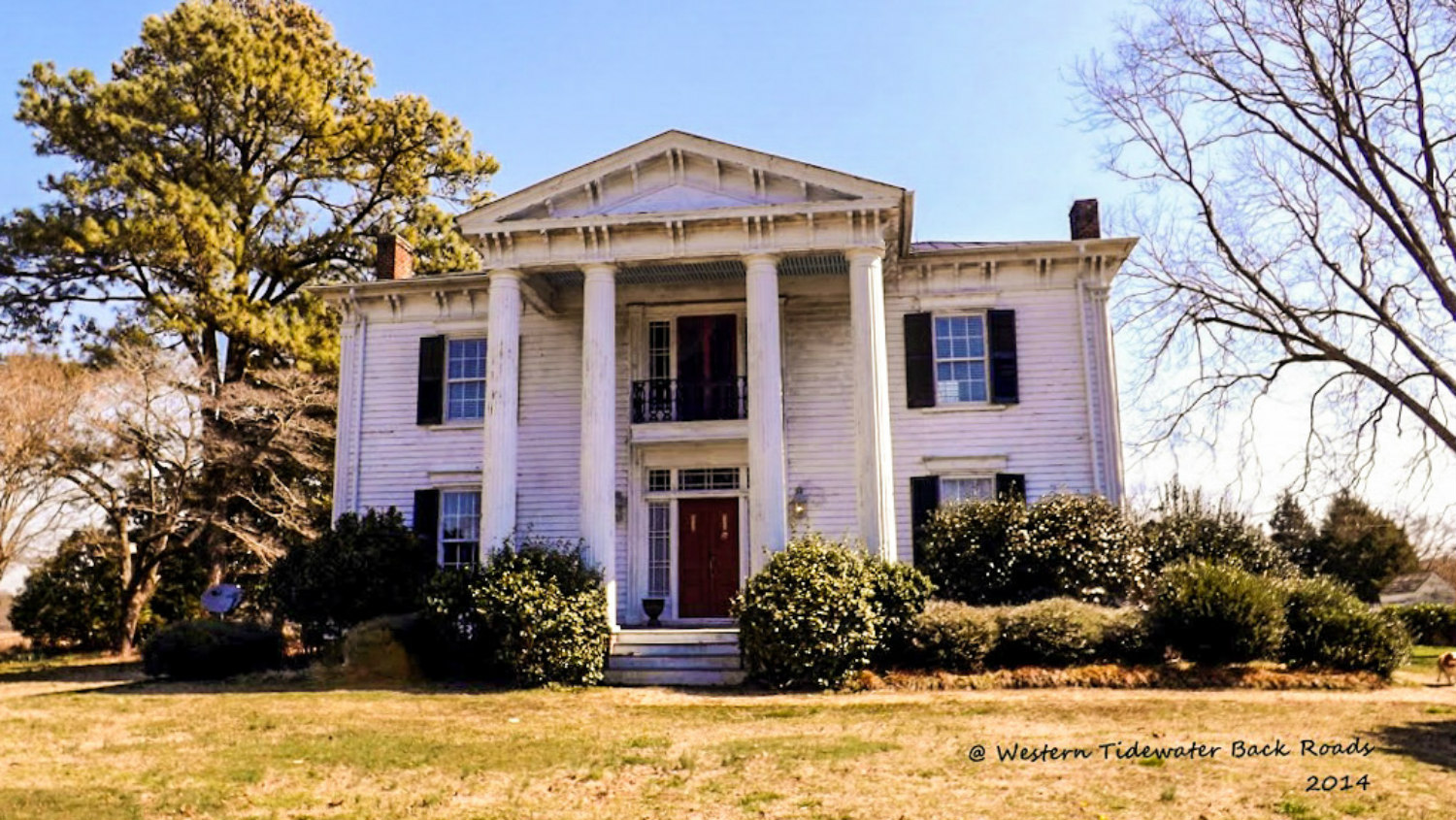

- Location within Virginia Location within the United States
- Location: VA 673, near Newsoms, Virginia
- Coordinates: 36°38′40″N 77°08′34″W
- Area: 42 acres (17 ha)
- Built: c. 1815, 1847, 1870
- Architectural style: Greek Revival, Italianate
- NRHP reference No.: 82004596
- VLR No.: 087-0098

Significant dates
- Added to NRHP: July 8, 1982
- Designated VLR: October 21, 1981

Sunnyside is a historic plantation house and complex located near Newsoms, Southampton County, Virginia. The house was built in three stages dating to about 1815, 1847, and 1870. It is a two-story, T-shaped frame dwelling. The main section was built in 1870, and has Greek Revival and Italianate design elements. The front facade features an imposing, two-story, pedimented portico sheltering the main entrance. Also on the property are 13 contributing outbuildings: a schoolhouse, school master's house, dairy, milk house, tenant's house, privy, pump house, sheds, peanut barn, a tall smokehouse, kitchen-laundry, and a garage.

It was listed on the National Register of Historic Places in 1979.
