= Sebrell Rural Historic District =

Historic district in Virginia, United States

- U.S. National Register of Historic Places
- U.S. Historic district
- Virginia Landmarks Register
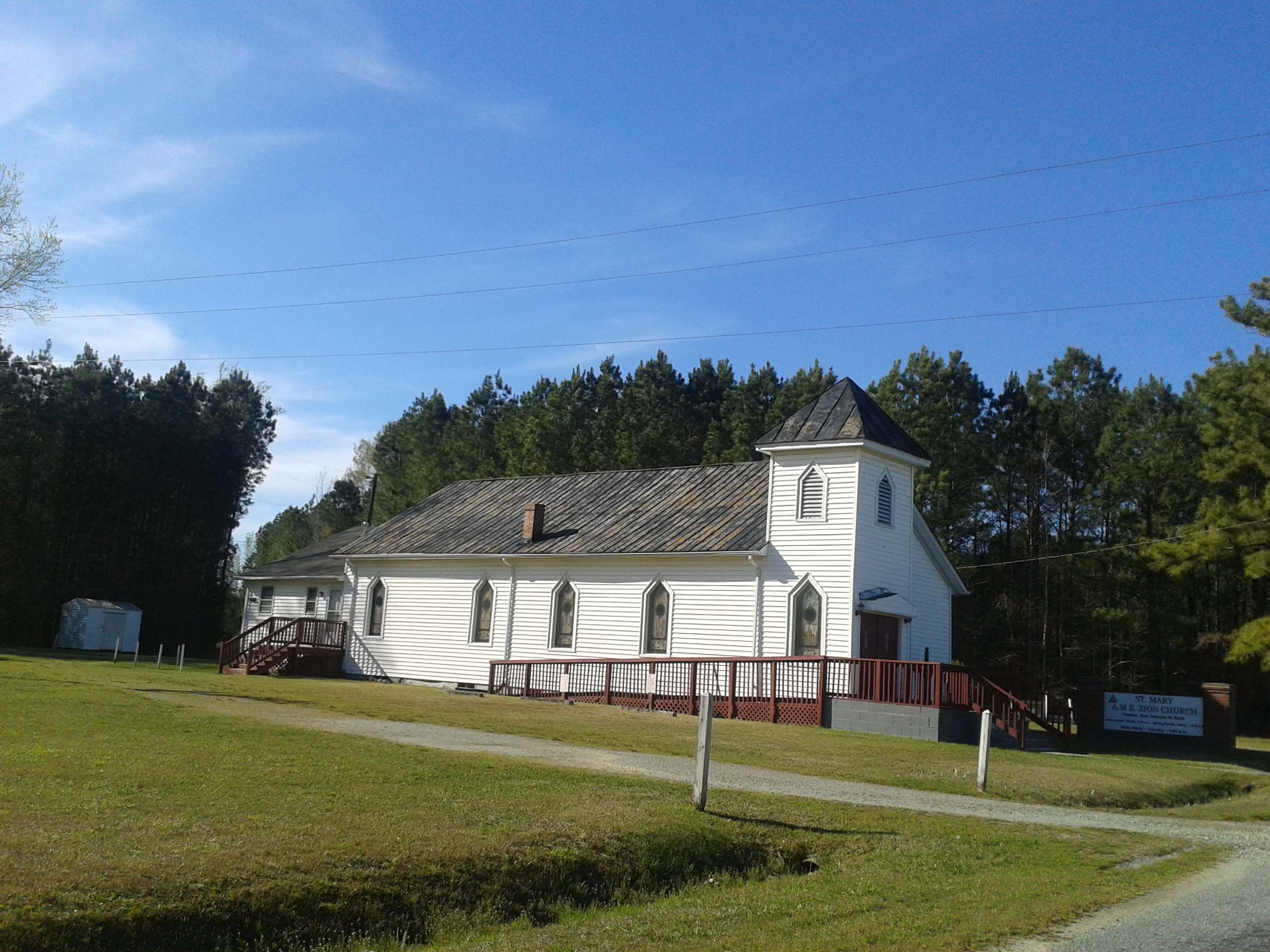
- St. Mary's AME Mount Zion Church, April 2017

- Location within Virginia Location within the United States
- Location: Roughly bounded by Nottoway R., Assamoosick Swamp & Old Hickory Rd., near Sebrell, Virginia
- Coordinates: 36°47′10″N 77°07′36″W
- Area: 10,550 acres (4,270 ha)
- Built: c. 1761-1931
- Architect: Multiple
- Architectural style: Georgian, Greek Revival, Italianate, Queen Anne, I-house
- NRHP reference No.: 13000648
- VLR No.: 087-5552

Significant dates
- Added to NRHP: August 27, 2013
- Designated VLR: September 30, 2010

The Sebrell Rural Historic District is a national historic district located near Sebrell, Southampton County, Virginia. The district encompasses 112 contributing buildings and 3 contributing sites near the historically African-American village of Sebrell. The buildings represent a variety of popular architectural styles including Georgian, Greek Revival, Queen Anne, and Italianate. They include residential, agricultural, commercial, governmental, and institutional buildings dating from the 18th to mid-20th centuries. Notable buildings include the Jesse Little Plantation House, W.B. Simmons Farm, Snowden, Quarter Farm (c. 1749), Unity Rowes General Store, Davis and Clark Store, Sebrell United Methodist Church (1910), and the St. Mary's AME Mount Zion Church (1910).

It was listed on the National Register of Historic Places in 2013.
