= Elm Grove Township =

Elm Grove Township may refer to:

- Elm Grove Township, Tazewell County, Illinois
- Elm Grove Township, Calhoun County, Iowa
- Elm Grove Township, Louisa County, Iowa
