= Aspen Lawn =

Historic house in Virginia, United States

- U.S. National Register of Historic Places
- Virginia Landmarks Register
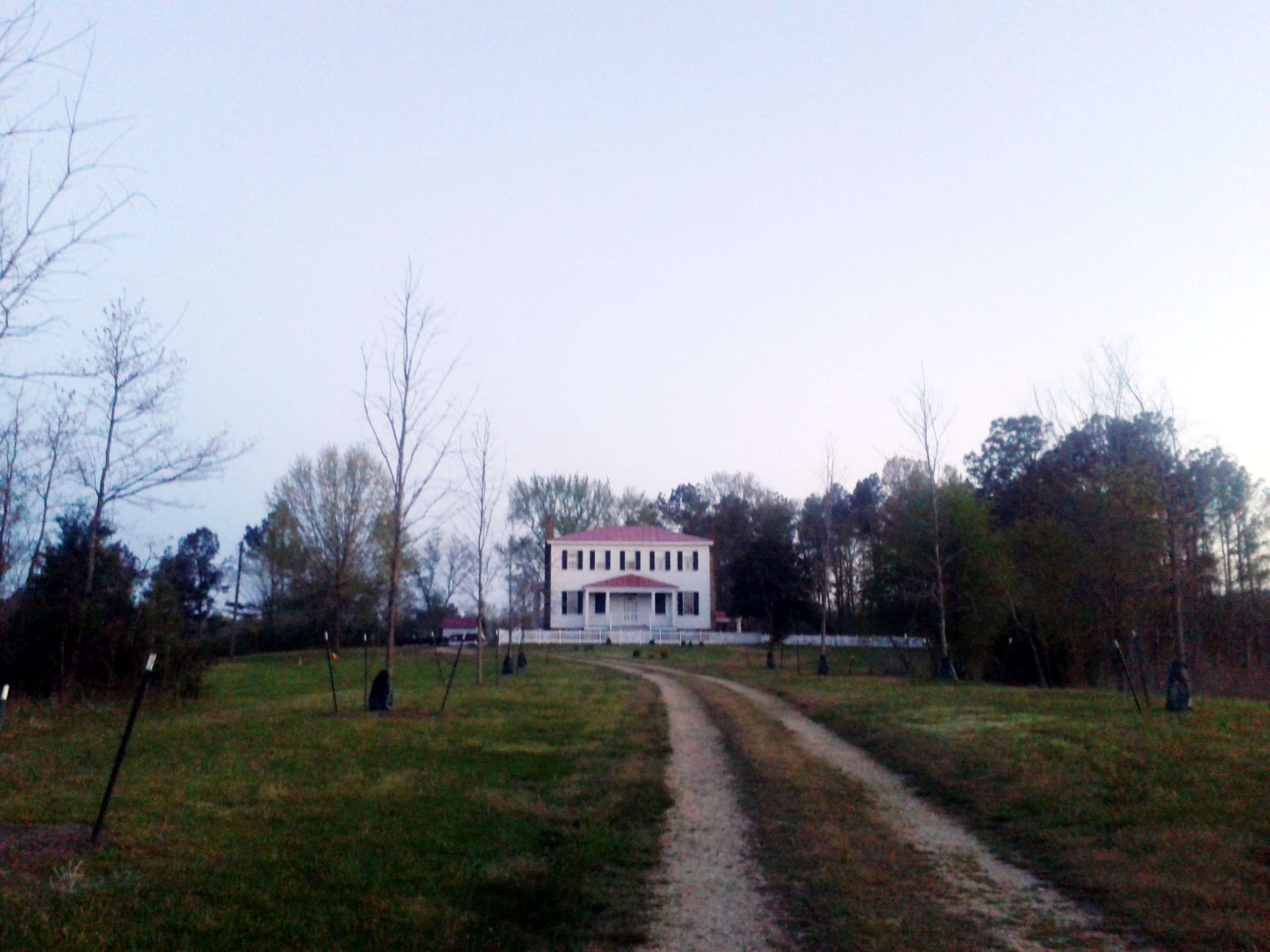
- Aspen Lawn at dusk, April 2017

- Location within Virginia Location within the United States
- Location: 4438 Hicksford Rd., near Drewryville, Virginia
- Coordinates: 36°39′53″N 77°26′11″W
- Area: 600 acres (240 ha)
- Built: 1798
- Architectural style: Federal, Greek Revival
- NRHP reference No.: 02000319
- VLR No.: 087-0137

Significant dates
- Added to NRHP: April 1, 2002
- Designated VLR: June 14, 2000

Aspen Lawn, also known as V.T. Drewey Farm and Rawles Tract, is a historic plantation house located near Drewryville, Southampton County, Virginia. It was built about 1798, and is a two-story, five-bay, double pile timber frame dwelling. It has a standing seam metal hipped roof, four exterior end chimneys, and sits on a brick foundation. The house has Greek Revival and Federal design elements. The front facade features an imposing, two-story, pedimented portico sheltering the main entrance. Also on the property are the contributing tobacco barn, and the ruins of a barn and smokehouse.

It was listed on the National Register of Historic Places in 2002.
