= Rochelle–Prince House =

Historic house in Virginia, United States

- U.S. National Register of Historic Places
- Virginia Landmarks Register
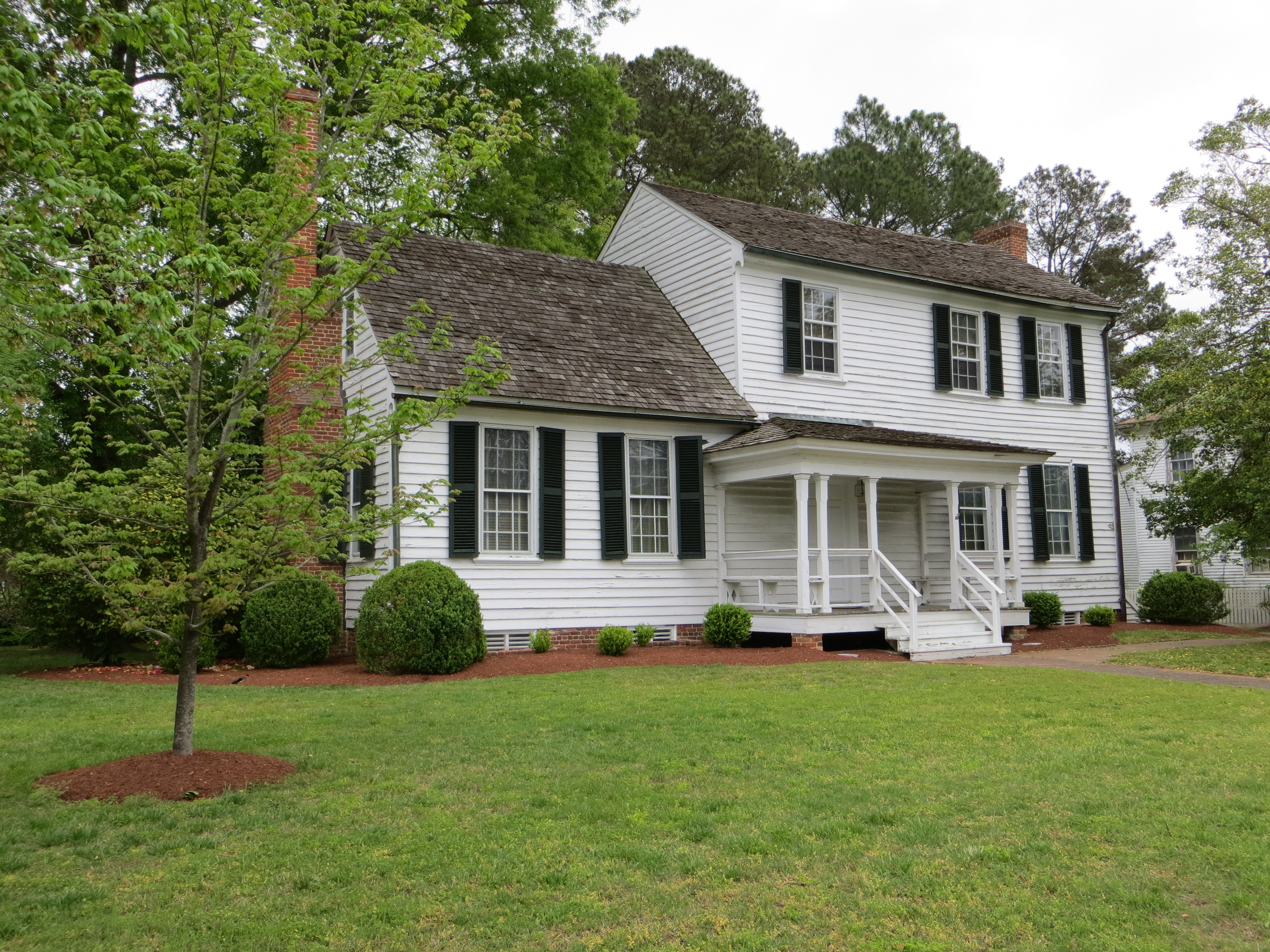
- Rochelle–Prince House April 2013

- Location within Virginia Location within the United States
- Location: 22371 Main St., Courtland, Virginia
- Coordinates: 36°42′47″N 77°03′59″W
- Area: less than one acre
- Built: c. 1814
- Architect: Multiple
- NRHP reference No.: 10001115
- VLR No.: 201-0002

Significant dates
- Added to NRHP: January 7, 2011
- Designated VLR: September 30, 2010

The Rochelle–Prince House is a historic home located at Courtland, Southampton County, Virginia. The original section dates to about 1814. The house consists of a 1 1/2-half-story, two-bay block attached to a two-story, three-bay block. The house was enlarged and remodeled between 1826 and 1827 and a rear ell was added about 1900.

James Rochelle was clerk of the Southampton County court during the trial of Nat Turner. His nephew was George Henry Thomas, a Union general in the American Civil War.

It was listed on the National Register of Historic Places in 2011.
