= Elm Grove, Texas =

Elm Grove may refer to:

- Elm Grove, Caldwell County, Texas
- Elm Grove, Cherokee County, Texas
- Elm Grove, Fayette County, Texas
- Elm Grove, Harris County, Texas
- Elm Grove, San Saba County, Texas
- Elm Grove, Wharton County, Texas
- Elm Grove, Williamson County, Texas
- Elm Grove Camp, Texas, in Guadalupe County
