= Newsoms, Virginia =

- Town
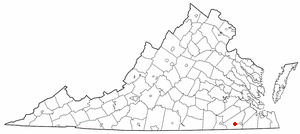
- Location of Newsoms, Virginia
- Coordinates: 36°37′40″N 77°7′36″W
- Country: United States
- State: Virginia
- County: Southampton

Area
  - Total: 0.50 sq mi (1.29 km^{2})
  - Land: 0.50 sq mi (1.29 km^{2})
  - Water: 0 sq mi (0.00 km^{2})
- Elevation: 85 ft (26 m)

Population (2020)
  - Total: 286
  - Estimate (2019): 297
  - Density: 594.2/sq mi (229.43/km^{2})
- Time zone: UTC−5 (Eastern (EST))
  - Summer (DST): UTC−4 (EDT)
- ZIP code: 23874
- Area codes: 757, 948
- FIPS code: 51-56096
- GNIS feature ID: 1471523

Newsoms is a town in Southampton County, Virginia, United States. As of the 2020 census, Newsoms had a population of 286.

== History ==
Sunnyside was listed on the National Register of Historic Places in 1982.

== Geography ==
Newsoms is located at 36°37′40″N 77°07′36″W (36.627714, −77.126695).

According to the United States Census Bureau, the town has a total area of 0.5 square mile (1.3 km^{2}), all land.

== Demographics ==
Historical population
Census	Pop.	Note	%±
1950	392		—
1960	423		7.9%
1970	389		−8.0%
1980	368		−5.4%
1990	337		−8.4%
2000	282		−16.3%
2010	321		13.8%
2020	286		−10.9%
U.S. Decennial Census

As of the census of 2000, there were 282 people, 124 households, and 77 families living in the town. The population density was 559.1 people per square mile (217.8/km^{2}). There were 141 housing units at an average density of 279.5 per square mile (108.9/km^{2}). The racial makeup of the town was 54.96% White and 45.04% African American.

There were 124 households, out of which 25.8% had children under the age of 18 living with them, 43.5% were married couples living together, 16.1% had a female householder with no husband present, and 37.1% were non-families. 33.1% of all households were made up of individuals, and 24.2% had someone living alone who was 65 years of age or older. The average household size was 2.27 and the average family size was 2.90.

In the town, the population was spread out, with 20.6% under the age of 18, 7.8% from 18 to 24, 27.3% from 25 to 44, 23.0% from 45 to 64, and 21.3% who were 65 years of age or older. The median age was 42 years. For every 100 females, there were 74.1 males. For every 100 females aged 18 and over, there were 79.2 males.

The median income for a household in the town was $26,250, and the median income for a family was $40,000. Males had a median income of $28,125 versus $18,125 for females. The per capita income for the town was $16,633. About 9.7% of families and 12.9% of the population were below the poverty line, including 11.8% of those under the age of eighteen and 24.4% of those 65 or over.

== Notable person ==
- Union Army Major General George Henry Thomas (1816–1870) was born here
