= William H. Vincent House =

Historic house in Virginia, United States

- U.S. National Register of Historic Places
- Virginia Landmarks Register
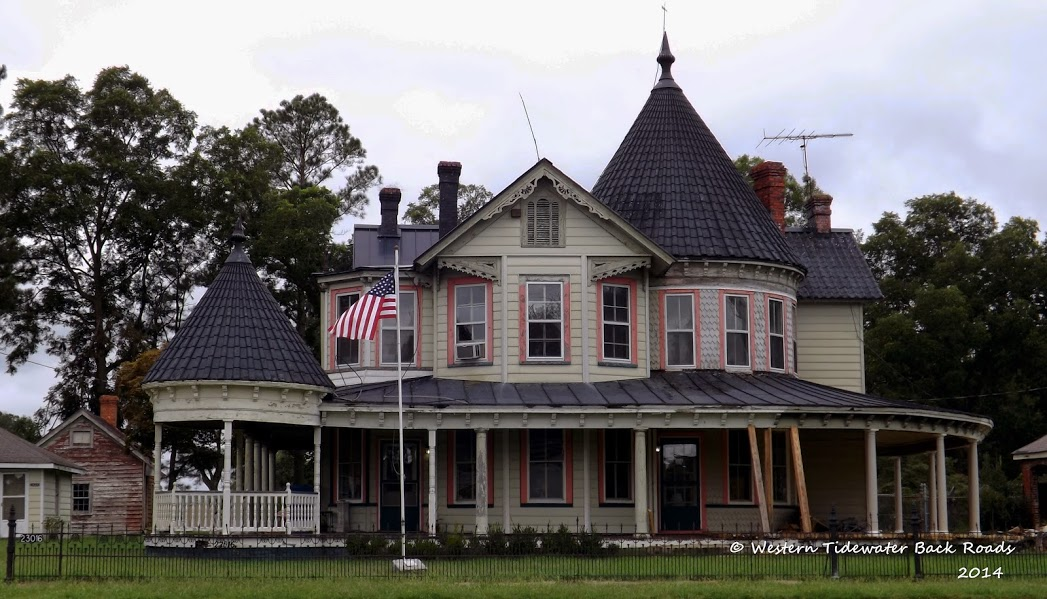

- Location within Virginia Location within the United States
- Location: 23016 Main St., Capron, Virginia
- Coordinates: 36°42′29″N 77°12′3″W
- Area: 1.1 acres (0.45 ha)
- Built: 1889
- Architectural style: Queen Anne
- NRHP reference No.: 03001444
- VLR No.: 183-5002

Significant dates
- Added to NRHP: January 16, 2004
- Designated VLR: September 10, 2003

William H. Vincent House is a historic home located at Capron, Southampton County, Virginia. It was built in 1889, and is a two-story Queen Anne style frame dwelling. It features a cross gable roof, tower, modillioned cornice and wrap-around porch. The porch incorporates a corner gazebo topped with a conical tin roof. Also on the property are the contributing two-room office building, a playhouse, a barn, and the Ambrose House.

It was listed on the National Register of Historic Places in 2004.
