= Nat Turner's Rebellion =

1831 slave rebellion in Virginia, US

- Part of events leading to the American Civil War and North American slave revolts
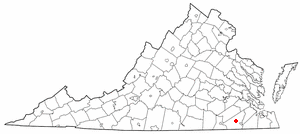
- Location of the rebellion in Southampton County, Virginia
- Date: August 21–23, 1831
- Duration: 3 days
- Location: Southampton County, Virginia, United States; 36.770°N 77.161°W
- Also known as: Southampton Insurrection; Nat Turner's Insurrection; Nat Turner's Revolt
- Type: Slave rebellion
- Organized by: Nat Turner
- Outcome: Rebellion suppressed Participants tried and executed or sold
- Casualties: ~55 White people; ~120 enslaved and freed Black people

Nat Turner's Rebellion, historically known as the Southampton Insurrection, was a slave rebellion that took place in Southampton County, Virginia, United States, in August 1831. Led by Nat Turner, the rebels, made up of enslaved African Americans, killed an estimated 55 White people, making it the deadliest slave revolt in U.S. history.

Nonetheless, the rebellion was effectively suppressed within a few days, at Belmont Plantation on the morning of August 23, but Turner survived in hiding for approximately ten weeks afterward: six weeks only leaving his hiding place "in the dead of night" for water; two weeks eavesdropping on the neighborhood at night for the purpose of gathering intelligence, and returning to his hiding place before dawn; and two weeks being "pursued almost incessantly", having been discovered by a dog.

There was widespread fear among the White population in the rebellion's aftermath. Militias and mobs killed as many as 120 enslaved people and free African Americans in retaliation. After trials, Virginia executed eighteen enslaved people accused of participating in the rebellion, including Turner himself; many Black people who had not participated were also persecuted in the frenzy.

Because Turner was educated and a preacher, Southern state legislatures passed new laws prohibiting the education of enslaved people and free Blacks, restricting the right of assembly and other civil liberties for free Blacks, and requiring White ministers to be present at all worship services.

== Preparations ==
Nat Turner was enslaved in Southampton County, Virginia, from the time of his birth in 1800. He began preparations for an uprising against the slaveowners of Southampton County. Turner said he wanted to spread "terror and alarm" among Whites. According to a report by James Trezvant immediately following the uprising, Turner's wife Cherry said that her husband had been "digesting" a plan for the revolt "for years".

Turner began sharing his plans to a small circle of enslaved men living in his "neighborhood". Turner said, "I communicated the great work laid out to do, to four in whom I had the greatest confidence". These initial recruits were:

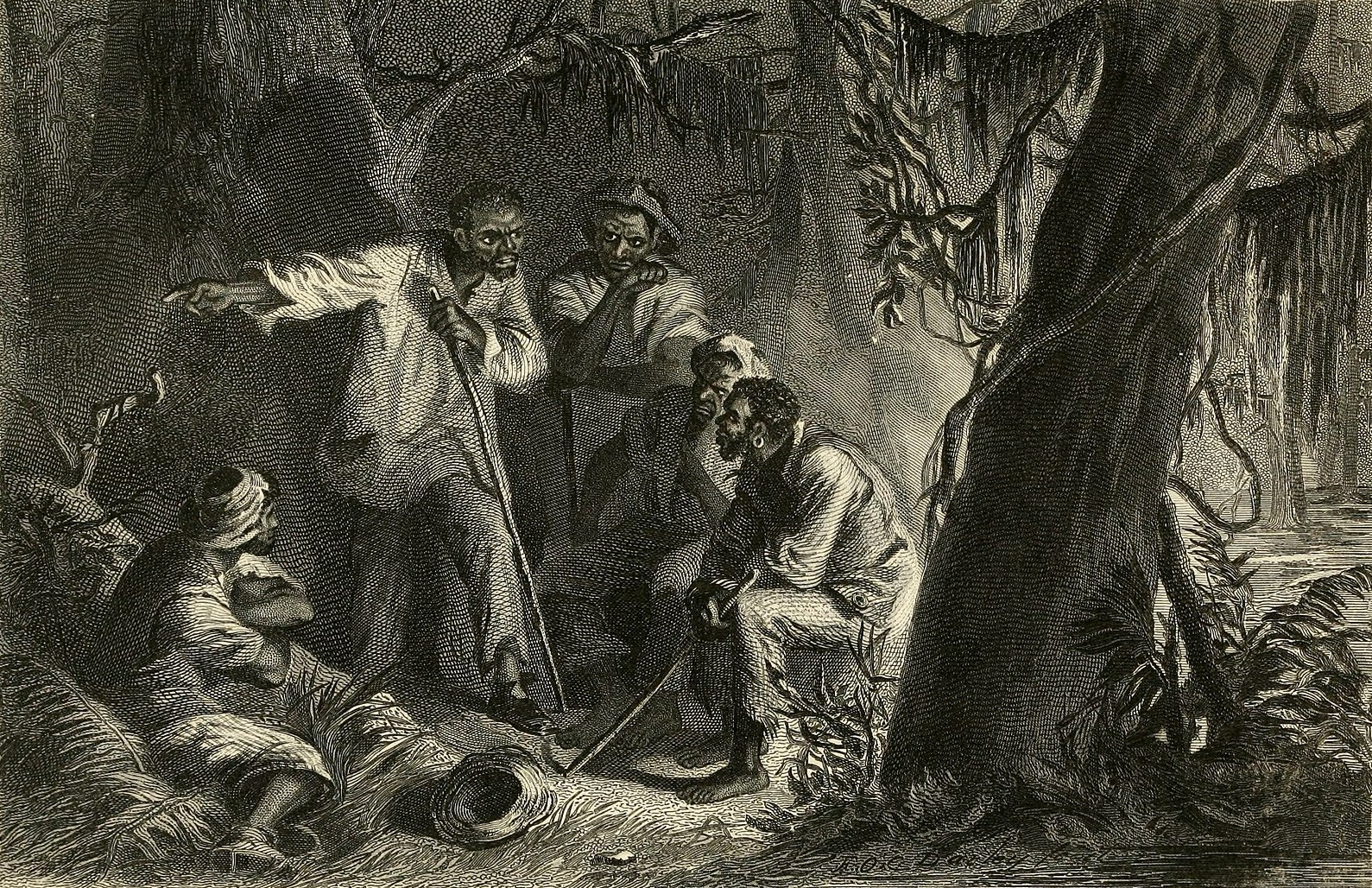
"Nat Turner & His Confederates in Conference", engraving from Orville J. Victor's History of American Conspiracies: A Record of Treason, Insurrection, Rebellion, &c. in the United States of America, From 1760 to 1860 (1863)

- Hark Moore, 30 years old, was the only other adult male enslaved on the Travis property with Turner. He took on a leadership role in the rebellion and was referred to as "Captain Moore" by other participants.
- Henry Porter, around 27 years old, was enslaved at the Porter farm. He likely knew Turner since childhood and had the skill of counting and reading numbers, which led to newspapers at the time referring to him as "The Paymaster". He took a leadership role, with other rebels likely referring to him as "General".
- Nelson Edwards, between 33 and 35 years old, was enslaved by Peter Edwards. He grew up in proximity to Turner, and the two seemed to know each other well. He recruited Jim and August, and two other slaves from his household, to join the efforts.
- Sam Francis, of unknown age, was enslaved at the Nathaniel Francis farm, which was adjacent to the farms of the other core collaborators. He recruited Will Francis and, together they killed Salathiel Francis during the rebellion.

The following were recruited to complete Turner's inner circle.

- Will Francis, around 37, was also enslaved at the Nathaniel Francis farm. He was recruited by Sam Francis as they lived on the same farm, but he likely met Turner during his time in a previous household.
- Jack Reese, around 21, was enslaved by William Reese. He was recruited by Moore, his brother-in-law. Several sources note that he was not as willing a participant as others, only acting under Moore's influence.

These six, with Turner, began planning what would become known as Nat Turner's Rebellion. The group decided that "until [they] had armed and equipped [themselves], and gathered sufficient force, neither age nor sex was to be spared." According to a letter sent to the Richmond Enquirer by an initial interviewer of Turner after his capture, "women and children would afterwards have been spared, and men too who ceased to resist."

They recruited more than fifty other participants before the rebellion ended. To do so, they had to find ways to communicate their intentions without revealing the plot. Songs may have tipped the neighborhood members to movements: "It is believed that one of the ways Turner summoned fellow conspirators to the woods was through the use of particular songs." According to author Terry Bisson, Turner entrusted his wife, Cherry, with "his most secret plans and papers".

== The rebellion ==
Turner eagerly anticipated God's signal to "slay my enemies with their own weapons". Beginning in February 1831, Turner interpreted atmospheric conditions as signs to prepare for the revolt. An annular solar eclipse on February 12, 1831, was visible in much of the southeastern United States, including Virginia; Turner envisioned this as a Black man's hand reaching over the sun. Illness prevented Turner from starting the rebellion as planned on Independence Day, July 4, 1831.

The conspirators used the delay to extend planning. On August 13, 1831, an atmospheric disturbance made the Virginia sun appear bluish-green, possibly the result of a volcanic plume produced by the eruption of Ferdinandea Island off the coast of Sicily. Turner took this as a divine signal and started the rebellion a week later, on Sunday, August 21.

On that August 21, 1831, the six men of the inner circle met for a meal that included a pig and brandy; Turner joined them at 3 p.m. to finalize plans. At 2 a.m., the men went to the home of Turner's enslaver, killing the sleeping family with axes. Over the course of 48 hours, the rebels then traveled from house to house, freeing slaves and killing Whites.

The rebellion expanded from several trusted slaves to over 70 enslaved and free Blacks, some of whom were on horseback. They were armed with knives, hatchets, and blunt instruments; firearms were too difficult to collect and would have drawn unwanted attention. Additional weapons were collected as the rebels moved from house to house; they also added to their numbers, growing from fifteen to fifty or sixty.

As planned, the rebels killed White people without discriminating by age or sex. Historian Stephen B. Oates writes that Turner called on his group to "kill all the white people". According to the Richmond Enquirer, "Turner declared that 'indiscriminate slaughter was not their intention after they attained a foothold, and was resorted to in the first instance to strike terror and alarm."

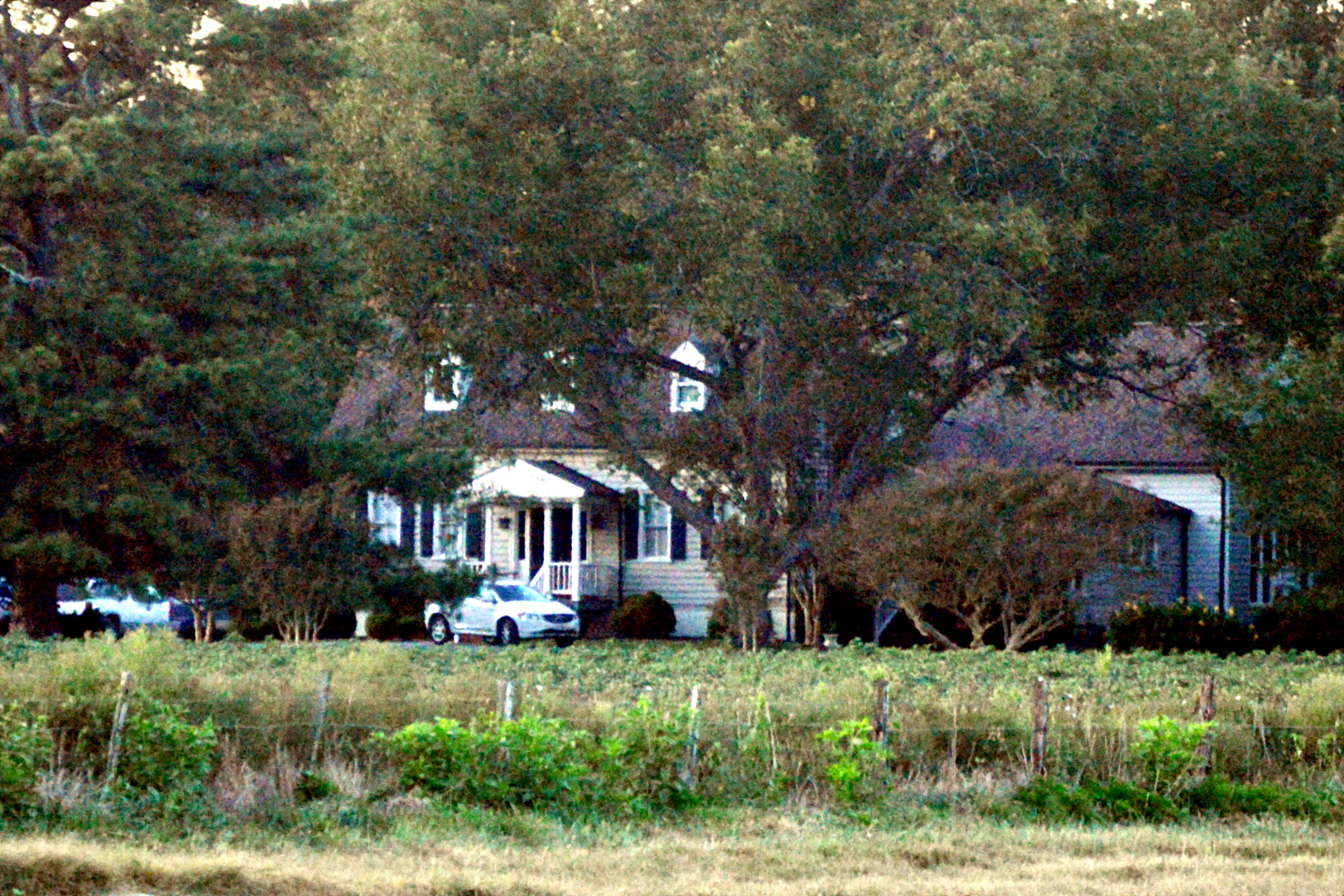
Belmont plantation, where the rebellion was suppressed

A few homes were spared "because Turner believed the poor White inhabitants 'thought no better of themselves than they did of negroes.'" Even though it was en route, the rebels also avoided the Giles Reese plantation where Turner's wife was enslaved, likely because Turner wanted to keep his wife and children safe. Turner confessed to killing only one person, Margaret Whitehead, whom he killed with a blow from a fence post.

One of their targets was a schoolhouse run by Levi Waller. During the attack, Turner's crew killed Mrs Levi Waller and around ten children at the schoolhouse. Levi Waller escaped through the swamp and a small girl survived through hiding in a chimney.

The last house to be attacked was the Rebecca Vaughan House. On midday August 22, Turner decided to lead his men toward Jerusalem, the county seat and closest town, where he hoped to find more weapons and ammunition. However, by then, a local militia had gathered to respond to the rebellion.

When confronted with opposition, the rebels dispersed, and several were apprehended. The rebels spent the night near slave cabins, waking in the morning to resume their attacks. Turner and his troops were repulsed by the local militia as they attempted to attack another house.

The local militia was joined by troops from the USS Natchez and USS Warren in Norfolk and militias from neighboring counties in Virginia and North Carolina. Brigadier General William Henry Brodnax commanded the Virginia militia.

The state and federal troops suppressed Turner's remaining force at Belmont Plantation on the morning of August 23, 1831. The militia had twice the manpower of the rebels and three companies of artillery.

Before they were defeated, the rebels killed an estimated 55 White people, of which 20 to 30 were children, making it the deadliest slave revolt in U.S. history. The rebellion was over, but Turner and many other rebels had escaped.

== Retaliation ==
In Southampton County, Blacks suspected of participating in the rebellion were beheaded by the militias, and "their severed heads were mounted on poles at crossroads as a grisly form of intimidation". A local road (now Virginia State Route 658) was called "Blackhead Signpost Road" after it became the site of one such display.

Rumors quickly spread that the slave revolt had spread as far south as Alabama. Fears led to reports in North Carolina of slave "armies" on highways, burning and massacring the White inhabitants of Wilmington, North Carolina, and marching on the state capital.

The fear and alarm resulted in White violence against Blacks on flimsy pretenses. The editor of the Richmond Whig described the scene as "the slaughter of many blacks without trial and under circumstances of great barbarity". The violence continued for two weeks after the rebellion. General Richard Eppes of the Virginia militia ordered a halt to the killing:

He will not specify all the instances that he is bound to believe have occurred but pass in silence what has happened, with the expression of his deepest sorrow, that any necessity should be supposed to have existed, to justify a single act of atrocity. But he feels himself bound to declare, and hereby announces to the troops and citizens, that no excuse will be allowed for any similar acts of violence, after the promulgation of this order.

In a letter to the New York Evening Post, Reverend G. W. Powell wrote that "many negroes are killed every day. The exact number will never be known." A militia company in Hertford County, North Carolina, reportedly killed 40 Black people in one day and looted $23 and a gold watch from those they killed. Captain Solon Borland, who led a militia detachment from Murfreesboro, North Carolina, condemned the Hertford County militia company's looting "because it was tantamount to theft from the White owners of the slaves".

Modern historians concur that the militias and mobs killed as many as 120 Blacks, most of whom were not involved with the rebellion. Historian David F. Allmendinger Jr. notes various studies that provide a range of 23 to more than 200 killed.

== Capture ==
Sam Francis, Hark Moore, and Jack Reese were captured during the rebellion. Nelson Edward was killed two days after the rebellion by militia forces as he attempted to retreat. Henry Porter was killed in a battle at Cross Keys, a rural crossroads within the county, two days after the rebellion ended. It is unclear what happened to Will Francis, but as he was not tried in court or formally executed, he was likely killed during the rebellion.

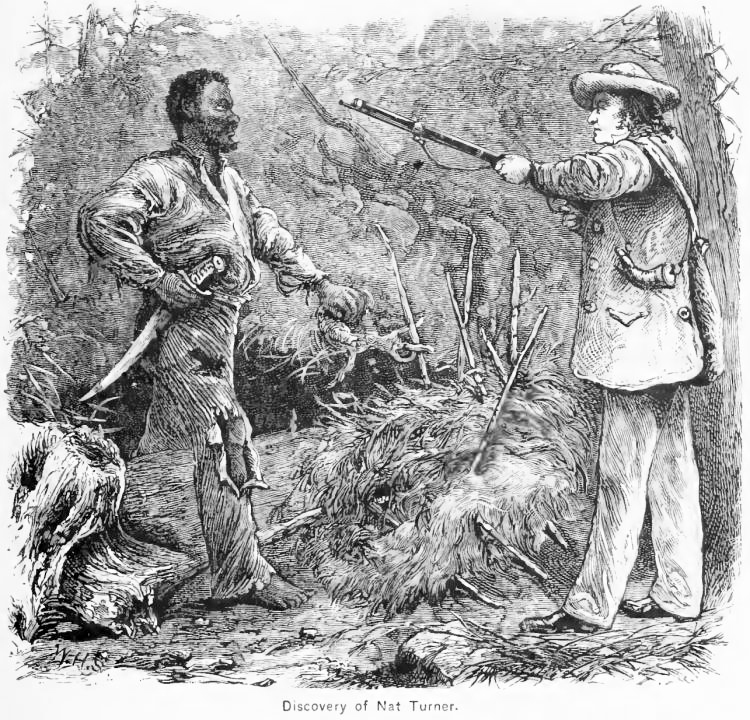
Discovery of Nat Turner, c. 1884 wood engraving by William Henry Shelton, illustrating Benjamin Phipps's capture of Nat Turner.

Turner eluded capture for approximately ten weeks but remained in Southampton County near his deceased owner's farm. According to Bisson, Turner's wife was "beaten and tortured in an attempt to get her to reveal his plans and whereabouts." After a raid on the Reese plantation, the Richmond Constitutional Whig reported on September 26 that "some papers [were] given up by his wife, under the lash." According to The Authentic and Impartial Narrative, also published in 1831, journal entries by Turner were "in her possession after Nat's escape."

On October 30, 1831, farmer Benjamin Phipps discovered Turner hiding in a depression in the earth created by a large, fallen tree and covered with fence rails. Turner arrived at the prison in Jerusalem around 1 p.m. on October 31. While awaiting trial, he confessed knowledge of the rebellion to attorney Thomas R. Gray.

== Trials and executions ==
Dozens of suspected rebels were tried by courts that were convened for the rebellion. Turner was tried on November 5, 1831, for "conspiring to rebel and making insurrection", and was convicted and sentenced to death. His attorney was James Strange French. James Trezvant served on the jury. Turner was hanged on November 11, 1831, in the county seat of Jerusalem, Virginia (now Courtland). According to some sources, he was beheaded to deter further rebellion. The body was dissected and flayed, and the skin used to make souvenir purses. In October 1897, Virginia newspapers reported that Dr. H. U. Stephenson of Toano, Virginia, was using the skeleton as a medical specimen.

Most of Turner's alleged conspirators were tried in Southampton County, with some trials in Sussex County or other nearby counties. Hark Moore and Sam Francis appeared in Southampton County court and were sentenced on September 3, and were executed on September 9. Jack Reese was tried and sentenced on September 5, and hanged on September 12. French, along with William Henry Brodnax and Meriwether Brodnax, represented many of the defendants. In total, thirty enslaved men were convicted, of whom eighteen were hanged and twelve were sold out of state; fifteen were acquitted. Four of the five free Blacks were tried and acquitted; one was hanged.

== Legislative response ==
During the rebellion, the Virginia General Assembly targeted free Blacks with an African relocation bill, and a police bill denying them trials by jury and criminal punishment by slavery and relocation. The General Assembly received petitions from at least seven slave owners asking to be compensated for slaves lost without trial because of the insurrection; they were all rejected.

The General Assembly debated the future of slavery the following spring. Some urged gradual emancipation, but the pro-slavery side prevailed after Virginia's leading intellectual, Thomas Roderick Dew, president of the College of William and Mary, published "a pamphlet defending the wisdom and benevolence of slavery, and the folly of its abolition". Laws were passed in Virginia which criminalized teaching Blacks to read and write, and restricted Blacks from holding religious meetings without a licensed White minister.

Other Southern slave-holding states also enacted legal restrictions on Black activities. Possession of abolitionist publications was criminalized in Virginia and other Southern states.

== Aftermath ==
On September 3, 1831, William Lloyd Garrison published an article, "The Insurrection", in the abolitionist newspaper The Liberator. On September 10, 1831, The Liberator published excerpts from a letter to the editor saying that many people in the South believed the newspaper had a link to the revolt and that if Garrison were to go to the South, he "would not be permitted to live long... he would be taken away, and no one is the wiser for it... if Mr. Garrison were to go to the South, he would be dispatched immediately... [an] opinion expressed by persons at the South, repeatedly."

In November 1831, Thomas R. Gray published The Confessions of Nat Turner, based on research he conducted while Turner was in hiding and from conversations with Turner before the trial. The pamphlet sold 40,000 to 50,000 copies, making it a noted source about the rebellion at the time. A November 25, 1831, review of the publication by The Richmond Enquirer said:

The pamphlet has one defect—we mean its style. The confession of the culprit is given, as it were, from his lips—(and when read to him, he admitted its statements to be correct)—but the language is far superior to what Nat Turner could have employed—Portions of it are even eloquently and classically expressed.—This is calculated to cast some shade of doubt over the authenticity of the narrative, and to give the Bandit a character for intelligence which he does not deserve, and ought not to have received.—In all other respects, the confession appears to be faithful and true.

Gray's work is the primary historical document about Turner but some modern historians, specifically Allmendinger, have also questioned the validity of his portrayal of Turner.

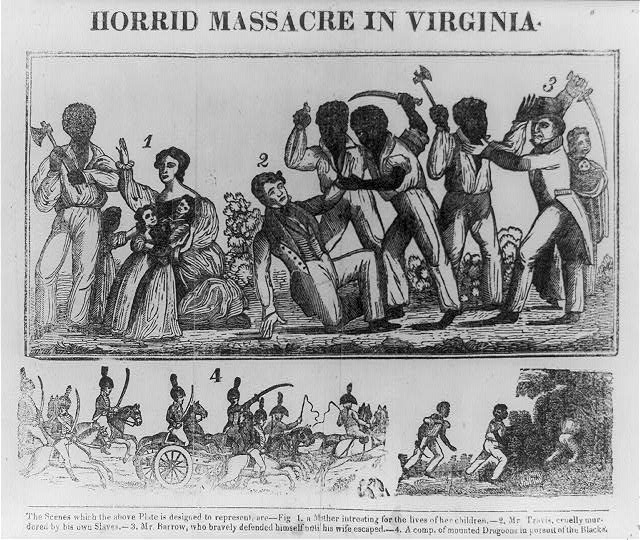
Nat Turner's Rebellion as depicted in Samuel Warner's Authentic and Impartial Narrative of the Tragical Scene, published in 1831

In the aftermath of the revolt, Whites did not try to interpret Turner's motives and ideas. Antebellum enslavers were shocked by the rebellion and feared further slave violence; to them, Turner became "a symbol of terrorism and violent retribution." Images were published depicting armed Black men attacking White men, women, and children; these "haunted White southerners and showed slave owners how vulnerable they were." Northern and Southern states shared many of the same fears; a proposal to create a college for African Americans in New Haven, Connecticut, was overwhelmingly rejected in the New Haven Excitement.

The fear Turner's rebellion caused and the concerns raised in the emancipation debates that followed resulted in politicians and writers defining "slavery as a positive good"; Thomas Dew was among those writers. Other Southern writers began to promote a paternalistic ideal of improved Christian treatment of slaves, in part to avoid such rebellions. Dew and others believed they were civilizing Black people, who were mostly American-born through slavery. These writings were collected in The Pro-Slavery Argument, As Maintained by the Most Distinguished Writers of the Southern States (1853).

Some Virginians wanted to remove all Black people from Virginia's Tidewater and Piedmont regions or deport all of them from the state. In 1852, the Virginia branch of the American Colonization Society sent 243 Black Virginians to Liberia.

== Other perspectives ==
In an 1843 speech at the National Negro Convention, Henry Highland Garnet, a former slave and active abolitionist, described Nat Turner as "patriotic", saying that "future generations will remember him among the noble and brave." In 1861, Thomas Wentworth Higginson, a White Northern writer, praised Turner in a seminal article published in the Atlantic Monthly. He described Turner as a man "who knew no book but the Bible, and that by heart who devoted himself soul and body to the cause of his race." Some modern historians have emphasized the role of religion in shaping Turner's actions. Anthony E. Kaye and Gregory P. Downs characterize Turner as self-proclaimed Biblical prophet whose worldview was deeply influenced by early 19th century Methodism.

African Americans have generally regarded Turner as a resistance hero for avenging the suffering of Africans and African Americans. James H. Harris, who has written extensively about the history of the Black church, says that the revolt "marked the turning point in the black struggle for liberation." In 1988, Turner was included in the Black Americans of Achievement biography series for children, with the book Nat Turner: Slave Revolt Leader by Terry Bisson. The book's introduction was written by Coretta Scott King. In 2012, Lonnie Bunch, the then-director of the National Museum of African American History and Culture, later to become the 14th Secretary of the Smithsonian, said that the "Nat Turner rebellion is probably the most significant uprising in American history."

== Legacy ==
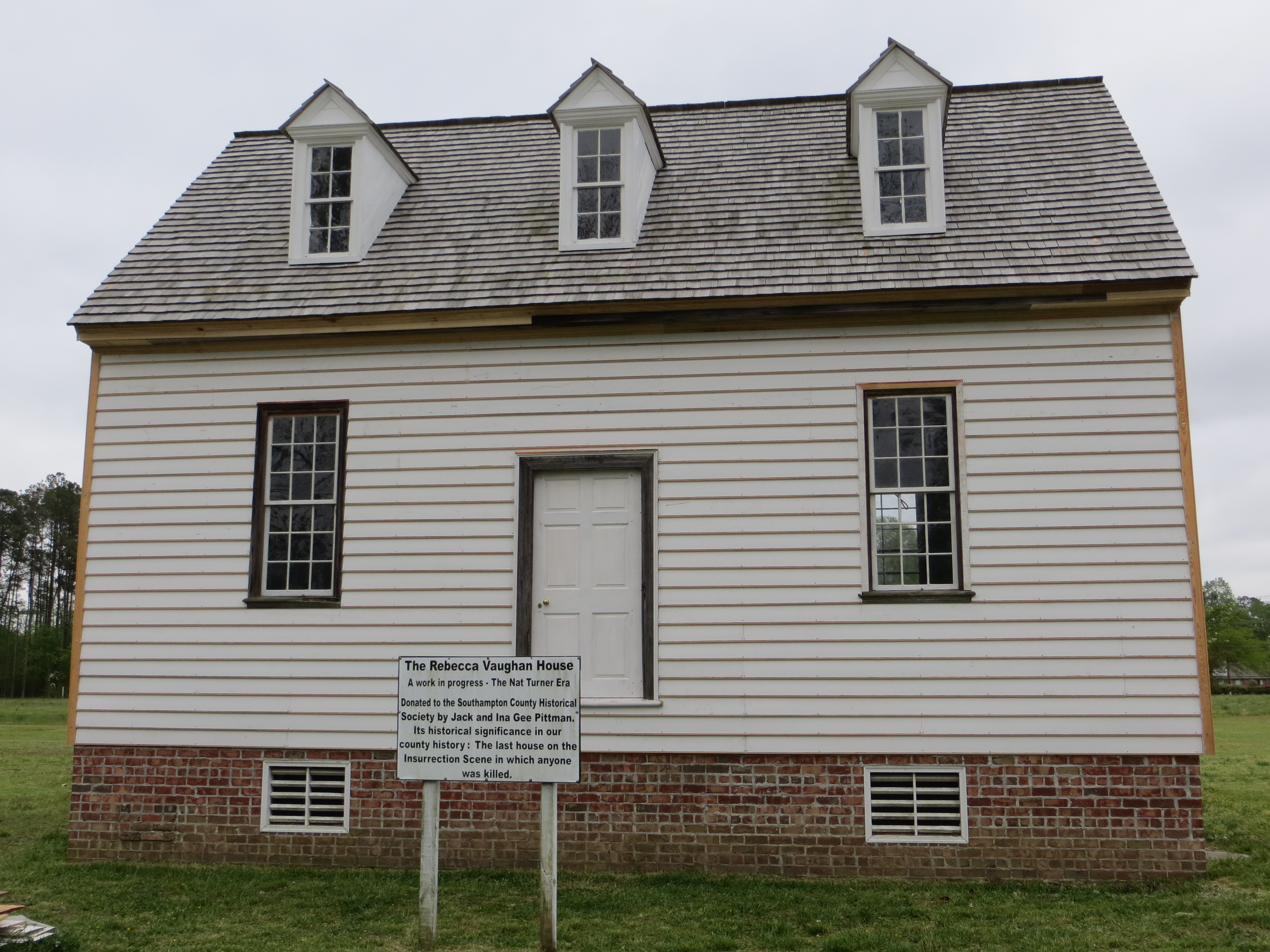
Rebecca Vaughan House

The sword Turner is believed to have used in the rebellion is displayed at the Southampton County Courthouse. In 1991, the Virginia Department of Historic Resources dedicated the "Nat Turner Insurrection" historic marker on Virginia State Route 30, near Courtland, Virginia. In 2021, the Virginia Department of Cultural Resources dedicated the "Blackhead Signpost Road" historic marker at the intersection of Virginia State Route 35 and Meherrin Road.

In 2004, the Southampton County Historical Society purchased the Rebecca Vaughan House for restoration and inclusion in their museum; this was the last surviving house where people were killed by participants in the rebellion. The Vaughan House was added to the National Register of Historic Places in 2006. The society has also created a driving tour of the sites and locations associated with the rebellion.

Nat Turner's Rebellion is celebrated as part of Black August.

== In popular culture ==
=== Film ===
- The Birth of a Nation, the 2016 film starring, produced, and directed by Nate Parker is about Turner's 1831 rebellion.

=== Literature ===
- The Confessions of Nat Turner (1967), a novel by William Styron, won the Pulitzer Prize for Fiction in 1968. It prompted much controversy, with some criticizing a White author writing about such an important Black figure and calling him racist for portraying Turner as lusting for a White woman.
- In response to Styron's novel, ten writers published a collection of essays, William Styron's The Confessions of Nat Turner: Ten Black Writers Respond (1968).

=== Music ===
- The 1960s funk-soul band Nat Turner Rebellion was named after the slave revolt.
- In the early 1990s, hip hop artist Tupac Shakur spoke in interviews about Nat Turner and his admiration for his spirit against oppression. Shakur also honored Turner with a cross tattoo on his back, "EXODUS 1831", referring to the year Turner led the rebellion.

== See also ==
- 1831 in the United States
- African-American history
- Back-to-Africa movement
- History of slavery in the United States
- List of incidents of civil unrest in the United States
- Slave rebellion and resistance in the United States
- Slavery in the United States
