= Courtland, Virginia =

Town in Southampton County, Virginia, US

- Town
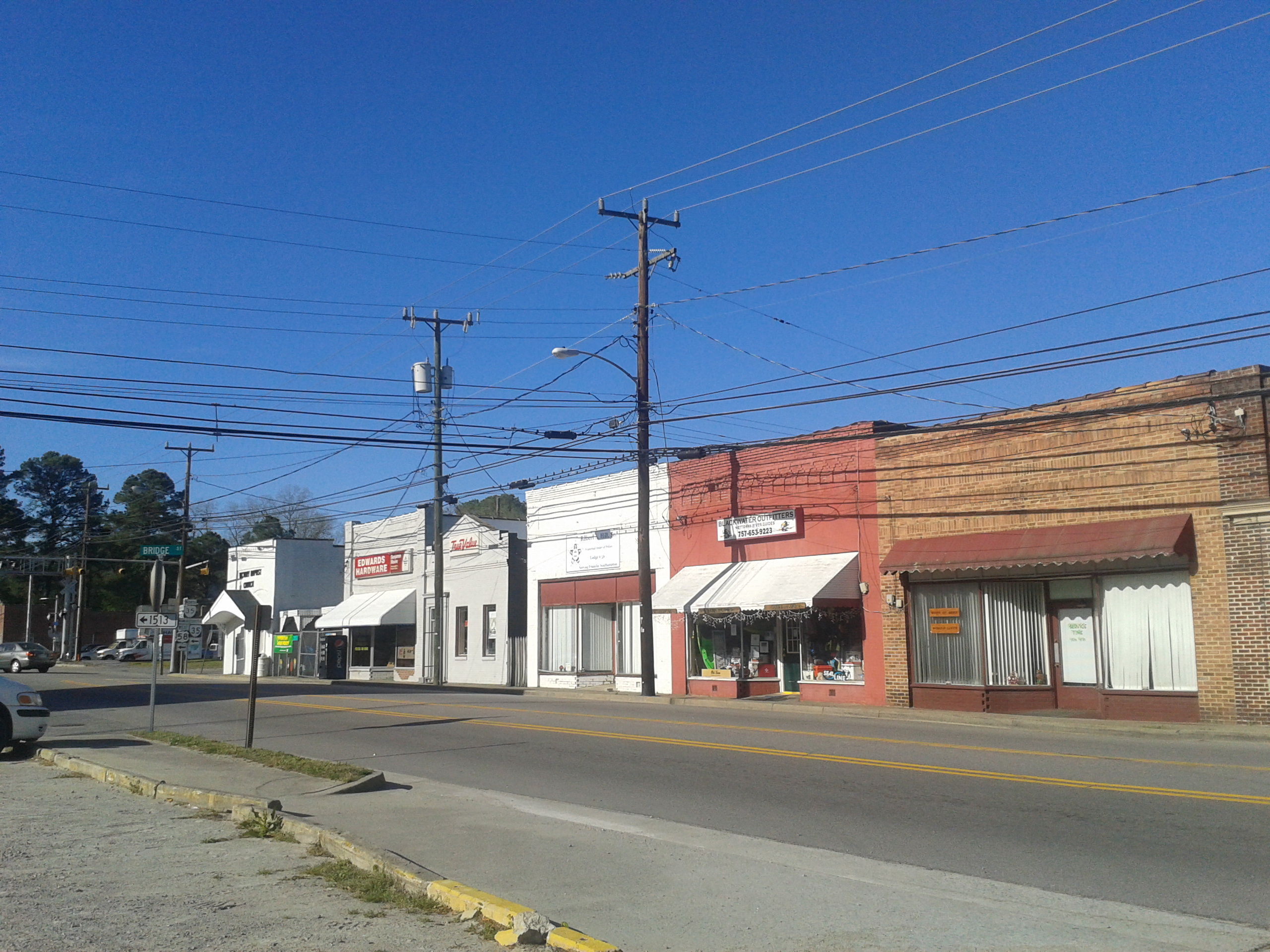
- A view of Main Street in Courtland, Virginia

- Location within the state of Virginia Courtland, Virginia (the United States)
- Coordinates: 36°42′57″N 77°3′58″W
- Country: United States
- State: Virginia
- County: Southampton

Area
  - Total: 0.92 sq mi (2.37 km^{2})
  - Land: 0.92 sq mi (2.37 km^{2})
  - Water: 0 sq mi (0.00 km^{2})
- Elevation: 23 ft (7.0 m)

Population (2020)
  - Total: 1,295
  - Density: 1,325.0/sq mi (511.59/km^{2})
- Time zone: UTC-5 (Eastern (EST))
  - Summer (DST): UTC-4 (EDT)
- ZIP code: 23837
- Area codes: 757, 948
- FIPS code: 51-19600
- GNIS feature ID: 1498469
- Website: Town of Courtland

Courtland is an incorporated town in Southampton County, Virginia, United States. It is the county seat of Southampton County.

As of the 2020 census, Courtland had a population of 1,295.

== History ==
Native Americans of the Cheroenhaka (Nottoway), and Meherrin tribes were the first inhabitants of the land that is now Courtland. Virginia's leaders prohibited Europeans from settling the area that is Courtland during the first 100 years of the colony. The Articles of Peace signed between the colony and the natives in 1677 set aside 41,000 acres (17,000 ha) for use by the Nottoway. As a result, the Nottoway established several settlements along the banks of the Nottoway River near what is now Courtland in the late 17th century. As late as 1821, the Nottoways maintained their traditional social order with a female leader.

In 1749, the European settlers formed Southampton County from Isle of Wight County, using the Blackwater River as the dividing line. In 1751, the county built a clerk's office, pillory, and prison on the eastern bank of the Nottoway River in the geographic center of Southampton. A courthouse was added to the complex in 1752.

A town grew around the courthouse and became a courthouse village and minor market center. The courthouse burned in 1767 and was replaced in 1768. The town was incorporated as the Town Jerusalem by the Virginia General Assembly in 1791. Jerusalem was Southampton County's only town through the 18th century. Eight trustees divided the town's ten acres (40,000 m^{2}) into half-acre lots alongside the courthouse on land owned by Joseph Scott and William Scott. The trustees created two streets—Main Street and the eastern end of Court Street. The trustees auctioned the lots with the requirement of adding a building within five years.

Henry Adams and Thomas Hunts purchased Lot 18 and built a house in 1796; they applied for a license to operate an ordinary there in 1797. Located across Main Street from the courthouse, the tavern offered a good view of the executions across the street, behind the jail's fence. A new courthouse was built in 1798.

Samuel Kello Jr., one of the original eight trustees and the Southampton County clerk of court, purchased the tavern in 1799. In 1828, he sold the ordinary to Henry Vaughan. James Rochelle replaced Kello as clerk of court and moved into and expanded a house built in 1811 by his father-in-law on Lots 14 and 15, across Main Street from the courthouse. There in the 1839s, Rochelle taught law to his nephew, George H. Thomas, before Thomas entered the United States Military Academy and became a Union General during the Civil War. In 1830, the Jerusalem Jockey Club formed and coordinated racing seasons in May and November.

In August 1831, the town became well known nationally as the site of the trials and subsequent executions of Nat Turner and some of his cohorts who had planned a major slave rebellion in Southampton County. During the rebellion, the county's planters sought refuge in Jerusalem and the state militia used Vaughn's tavern as its base of operation. However, a Richmond newspaper criticized Vaughn for charging the state $800 for militia expenses. Three years after the rebellion, the county's leaders approved the construction of a new brick courthouse. Jeremiah Cobb and Clement Rochell constructed the courthouse for $2,500.34.

In 1835, Martin's Gazetteer of Virginia said the town included "25 houses, four stores, a saddlery, a carriage maker, two hotels, a masonic hall, and two houses of public entertainment (taverns)." Despite its modest population of 175 people, the town became crowded when the court was in session.

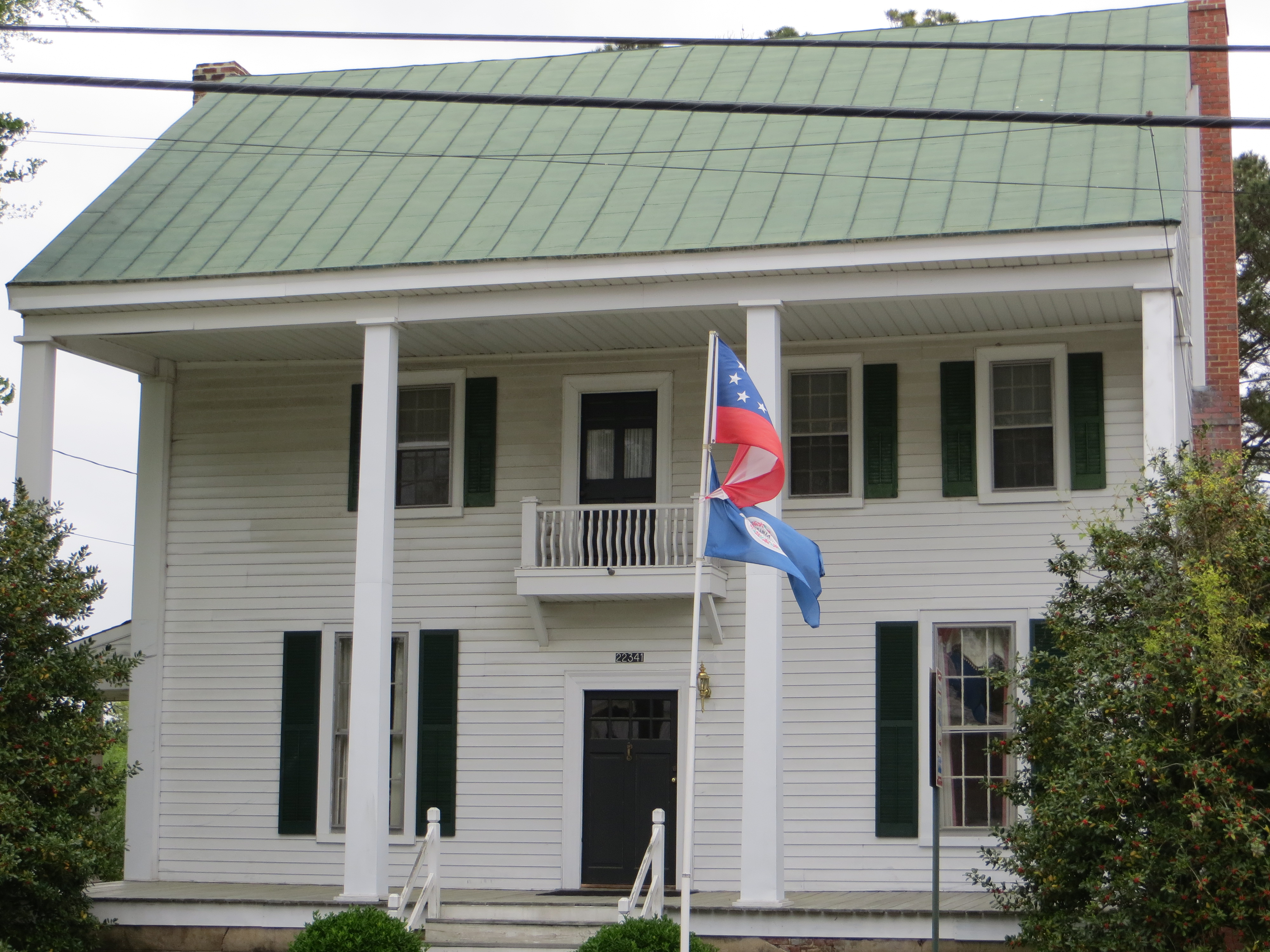
Mahone’s Tavern

In 1839, Vaughn sold his tavern to Fielding J. Mahone, giving it the name Mahone's Tavern. Mahone purchased the adjacent Hart Tavern and connected the two with a breezeway. Mahone's teenage son moved to Jerusalem with the family. He is better known as Confederate Major General William Mahone who served in the Virginia House of Delegates, as Petersburg mayor, and as a U.S. Senator.

In 1853, the town was connected to Petersburg via the Jerusalem Plank Road, essentially today's Virginia State Route 35. The Nottoway River also was a mode of transportation. The town was accessed from the south by a wooden bridge over the Nottoway that led to Rochelle Street, just south of the courthouse.

The town was not the site of any military conflicts during the Civil War; however, troops passed through Jerusalem during the Siege of Suffolk and used Mahone's Tavern and the Baptist church as temporary hospitals. Deceased soldiers were buried in a graveyard behind the church. After the Civil War, the town stagnated, probably due to the loss of enslaved labor in the surrounding area. However, nearly freed African Americans started participating in the political process after gaining the right to vote. A crowd of African Americans assembled in the town on June 21, 1867, for a speech by Thomas Jefferson Pretlow, who twice served as one of the county's representatives in the Virginia House of Delegates.

Josephine Howard acquired Mahone's Tavern in 1869, renaming it "Howard's Hotel". It continued to host many social gatherings, including a new tradition of a medieval-style tournament that featured colorful costumes, jousting on horseback, and a dinner and dance at the hotel.

Jerusalem became a stop on the Atlantic and Danville Railway in 1888, allowing residents to ride the train to Petersburg and Norfolk for business and shopping. The railroad led to rapid growth and change in the town. The town petitioned the state to change its name to Courtland. Postmistress Fannie Barnett suggested the name change after town residents were teased in Norfolk as being "those Arabs from Jerusalem". The General Assembly chartered Courtland in 1888; this legislation expanded the town boundary and defined a new town government with an elected mayor and a council of six who could issue business licenses and levy local taxes.

With the railroad, Courtland became a center for processing and warehousing agricultural produce such as peanuts and cotton from the surrounding county. The north–south oriented railroad was built on land owned by the Kindred family, who divided their 106 acres (43 ha) tract into lots near the railroad. New warehouses were built adjacent to the tracks as early as 1888 and were available for lease to local farmers and businesses. The post office was relocated beside the railroad. The bridge across the Nottoway was moved away from the center of town in the late 19th century, aligning with the existing bridge on U.S. Route 58 Business that parallels the railroad tracks. The Birdsong Storage Company began a peanut milling plant in Courtland at the turn of the 20th century. A fertilizer plant opened alongside the railroad.

In 1928 and 1929, the Courtland Rosenwald School was built on the north side of Courtland for $4,000. The Rosenwald Fund donated $500, the county contributed $2,500, and the town's African American community raised $1,00. Courtland experienced two large fires in 1934 and 1935, damaging many historic structures and resulting in new buildings being added to the downtown commercial district. The Southampton County Training School opened outside of Courtland in 1937, providing the first access to grades 8 through 12 for African Americans in the county. (Its name was changed to Riverview High School in 1963).

In 1947, the Hancock Peanut Company opened a processing facility outside town and employed 77 people; its founder invented the peanut shelling machine in 1944. However, the railroad service ended after the 1970s, and the railroad depot was demolished.

== Geography ==
Courtland is located at 36°42′57″N 77°3′58″W (36.715702, -77.066063). The town is the geographic center of Southampton County and the north shore of the Nottoway River that flows northwest to southeast. Courtland is located around the intersection of U.S. Route 58 Business (Main Street), which runs roughly north–south, and U.S. Route 58 (Meherrin Road), which intersects from the west.

Courtland is in the Tidewater region with flat, sandy lands. East of Courtland is the swampy, forested river margin of the Nottoway River. The area surrounding the town consists of agricultural fields and scattered woodlands and swamps.

According to the United States Census Bureau, the town has a total area of 0.92 square miles (2.4 km^{2}), all land.

Historical population
Census	Pop.	Note	%±
1900	288		—
1910	283		−1.7%
1920	379		33.9%
1930	355		−6.3%
1940	459		29.3%
1950	443		−3.5%
1960	855		93.0%
1970	899		5.1%
1980	976		8.6%
1990	819		−16.1%
2000	1,270		55.1%
2010	1,284		1.1%
2020	1,679		30.8%
U.S. Decennial Census

== Demographics ==
In 2020, the population of Courtland was 1,679 people. Its racial makeup was 52% White, 41.2% African American, 4.41% from two or more races, 0.119% Asian, and other non-Hispanic 0.357%. Hispanic or Latino of any race were 1.91%.

At the 2000 Census, the town's population was 1,270 people, with 460 households and 300 families. The population density was 1,373.2 people per square mile (533.0/km^{2}). There were 498 housing units at an average density of 538.5 per square mile (209.0/km^{2}). Its racial makeup was 52.28% White, 47.01% African American, 0.16% Native American, 0.08% Asian, and 0.47% from two or more races. Hispanic or Latino of any race were 0.24%.

Of the 460 households, 33.9% had children under the age of eighteen years living with them, 42.6% were married couples living together, 20.9% had a female householder with no husband present, and 34.6% were non-families. 32.6% of households were one person, and 17.0% were one person aged 65 or older. The average household size was 2.35, and the average family size was 2.96.

The age distribution was 23.1% under the age of 18, 7.6% from 18 to 24, 27.0% from 25 to 44, 23.1% from 45 to 64, and 19.1 percent 65 or older. The median age was 38 years. For every 100 females, there were 93.9% males. For every 100 females aged 18 and over, there were 87.7% males.

== Economy ==
Courtland is historically a town driven by the county's agriculture, especially cotton, peanuts, tobacco, and the production of hams. Peanuts and soybeans became the chief cash crops in the second half of the 20th century. The Hancock Peanut Company continues to operate as part of the larger Severn Peanut Company. Belmont Peanuts, Ferdies/The Peanut Patch, and Parkers Peanuts are some of the other peanut processors in Courtland. These businesses are part of the Peanut Trail, an agrotourism venture. There is also an active fertilizer factory in Courtland.

In 2020, the median household income was $50,529, with 17.6 percent living below the poverty line. Males had a median income of $50,000 versus $22,031 for females. The median property value was $187,200, with 53.3 percent of Courtland's residents owning their own home.

In the 2000 census, the median household income was $31,750, and the median family income was $43,229. Males had a median income of $34,464 versus $20,714 for females. The per capita income for the town was $18,474. About 19.2 percent of families and 21.6 percent of the population were below the poverty line, including 30.6 percent of those under age 18 and 22.1 percent of those aged 65 or over.

== Arts and culture ==
=== Arts facilities and museums ===
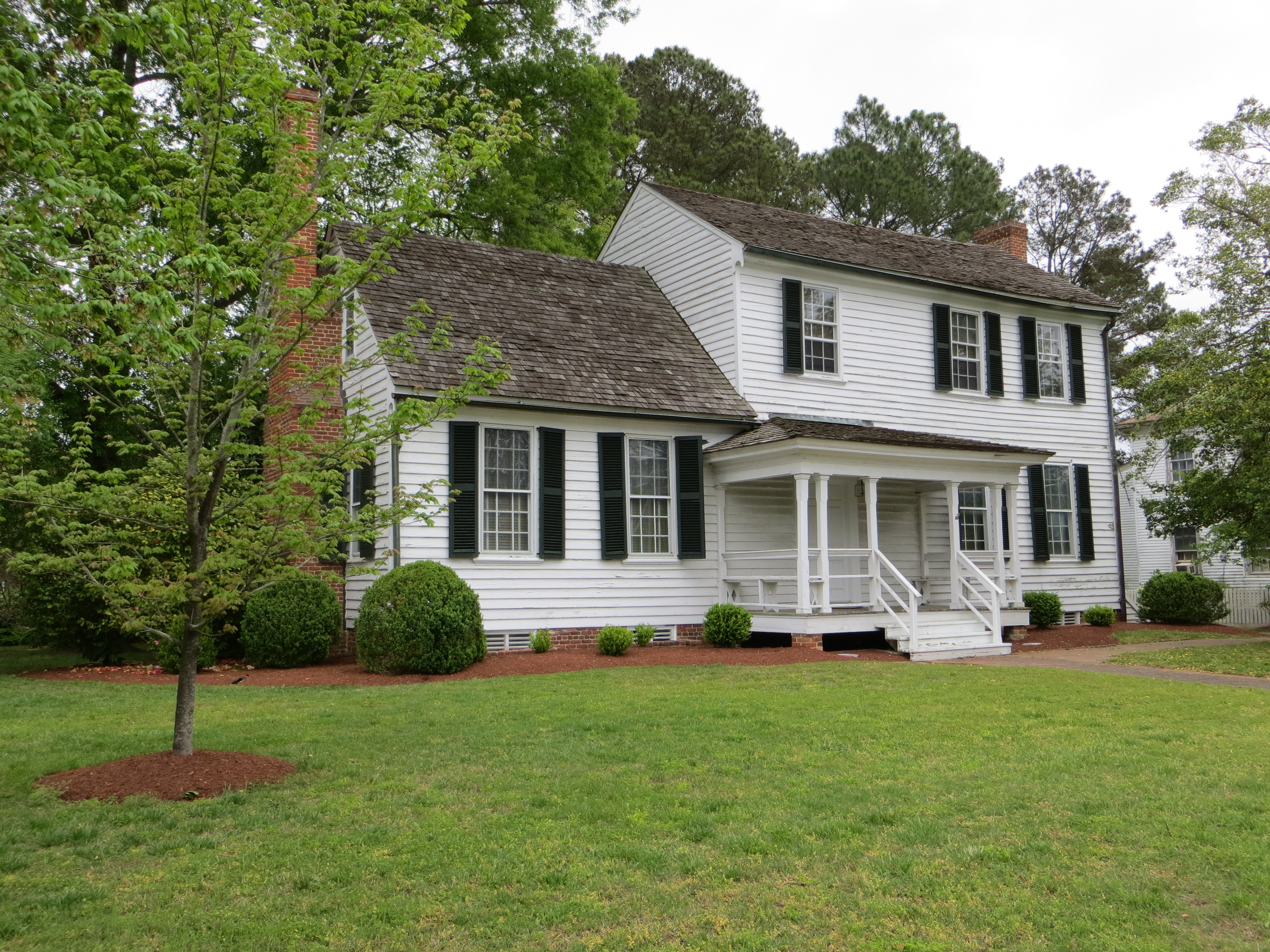
Rochelle-Prince House

- Cattashowrock Town, cultural center and museum of the Cheroenhaka (Nottoway) Indian Tribe
- Historic Courtland Walking Tour
- Mahone's Tavern & Museum
- Museum of Southampton History
- Rawls Museum Arts, visual arts exhibitions
- Rochelle-Prince House is a historic house owned and operated by the Southampton County Historical Society
- Southampton Agriculture and Forestry Museum/Southampton Heritage Village, featuring the Rebecca Vaughan House
- Peanut Trail: Salty Southern Route

=== Festivals and events ===
The Cheroenhaka (Nottoway) Indian Tribe holds its annual Native American Revival in September. For more than thirty years, the tribe has held its annual Corn Harvest Powwow and School Day in November. The Southampton County Historical Society hosts a Heritage Day annually at its Southampton Agriculture and Forestry Museum and Southampton Heritage Village, featuring living history demonstrations, displays, crafts, and re-enactments.

=== Architecture ===
The Courtland Historic District was established by the Virginia Landmark Register on December 12, 2019, and the National Register of Historic Places on March 19, 2020. It encompasses 284 contributing resources and 135 acres (55 ha) in the north half of the town, along the east bank of Nottoway River, essentially running along Main Street/U.S. Route 58 Business. The district includes the courthouse, churches, commercial buildings, and residences in the American Craftsman, Colonial Revival, Federal, Italianate, Gothic Revival, Minimal Traditional, Queen Anne, Tudor Revival, and Victorian architectural styles.

Churches in the historic district are all from the 20th century and include the Gothic Revival St. Luke's Episcopal and First Baptist; the latter was originally framed but now has a brick veneer. Built in 1906, St. Luke's has large, stained-glass windows and a steeple clad in wooden shingles. Adjacent to St. Luke's, Courtland United Methodist was built in Colonial Revival style and has a central tower. Courtland Baptist is a Romanesque Revival brick structure. The David Temple AME Zion was built in 1966 on the west side of town and does not follow a revival style. The town's main cemetery, Riverside Cemetery, was originally associated with St. Luke's. The one-acre Helping Hand Cemetery is located on the north side of Courtland and was opened for African Americans in 1897. This historic district also included the Mahone-Manry cemetery, a private plot behind the Seven Gables house, and a Confederate burial ground behind the Courtland Baptist Church.

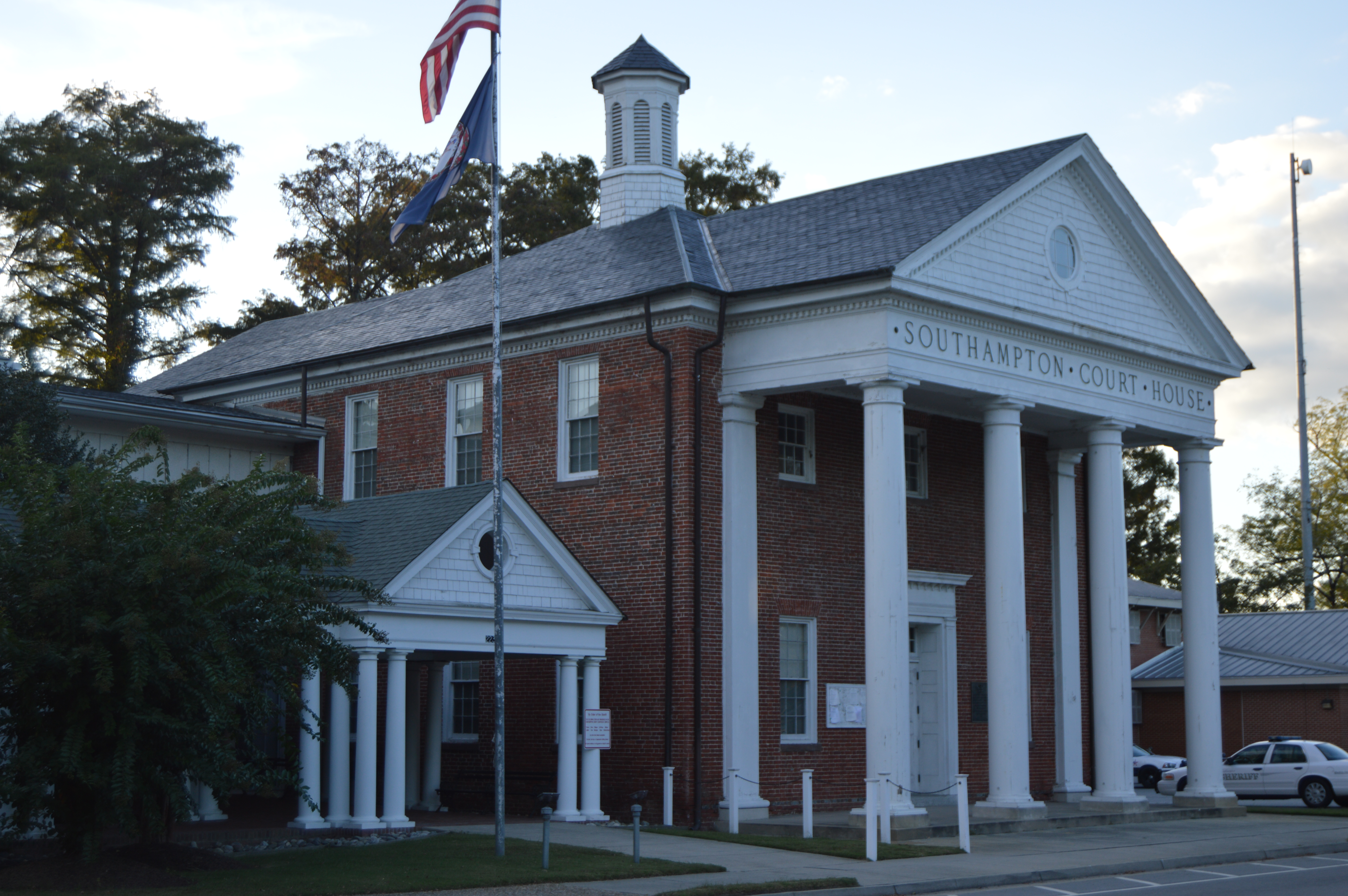
Southampton County Courthouse

The Southampton County Courthouse was built in June 1834 in a modest version of the Jeffersonian Classical style. The brick structure includes a Colonial Revival style pediment and four-columned portico were added in 1924. Located across from the courthouse on Main Street, Mahone's Tavern was built around 1796 in the Federal style. The two-story tavern is built on a hall-parlor plan and has a balcony over the front door, as well as a two-story inset porch. Next door to Mahone's Tavern, the c. 1820 Bell House is decorated with sawn trim and other folk Victorian elements.

Across Main Street from the courthouse, the Rochelle-Prince House was built in 1814 and expanded in 1817. It has been restored with a shake shingle roof by the Southampton County Historical Society. Located on Main Street near Courtland United Methodist, Seven Gables is a c. 1790 house that has been expanded. The Briggs-Manry house also dates to c. 1790 but was moved from its original location. Also moved to its current location in Courtland, the Rebecca Vaughan House is a three-bay frame dwelling dating to c. 1790. Originally located in Southampton County, the Vaughn House was moved to the Southampton Agriculture & Forestry Museum and Heritage Village in 2004 and restored for its connection to Nat Turner's rebellion.

The core of Coutland's business district consists of early 20th-century one- and two-story buildings facing Main Street. The Courtland Town Hall is a former brick service station dating to c. 1930. The Masonic Lodge is also located along Main Street; it is a two-story frame building that dates to the late 19th century. Along the railroad is an abandoned Birdsong peanut processing facility with a large warehouse and silos.

The Courland Rosenwald School, built in 1928 and 1929, is restored as a community center. It is an example of the “Two Teacher Community School, To Face East or West Only (Floor Plan No. 20)" standardized Rosenwald school designs by architect Samuel Smith. It is listed on the National Register of Historic Places. Mahone's Tavern, the Rochelle-Prince House, and the Rebecca Vaughan House are also listed on the National Register of Historic Places.

== Parks and recreation ==
The Nottoway River Board Landing in Courtland provides access to fishing and boating on the Nottoway River.

== Government ==
Courtland is the county seat of Southampton County. The county is governed by an elected Board of Supervisors that includes seven members. The Southampton County Courthouse is located in Courtland and houses the 5th Judicial Circuit of Virginia.

== Education ==
=== Public schools ===
Southampton County Public Schools system is located in Courtland. Its schools in Courtland include Riverdale Elementary which serves grades Pre-K through 5, Southampton Middle serving grades 6 through 8, and Southampton High School which serves grades 9 through 12.

=== Private schools ===
Southampton Academy is a private school in Courtland that serves grades Pre-K through 12.

== Infrastructure ==
=== Transportation ===
Courtland and the adjacent county rely on their road and highway network. Courtland includes the junction of Virginia State Route 35 (SR35) and U.S. Route 58 (US58), the main thoroughfare that extends across Virginia south of the James River. US 58 Business becomes Courland's Main Street and SR35 is called Meherrim Road. US58 Business provides the main bridge across the Nottoway River into Courtland from the south. Main Street runs southeast and becomes Jerusalem Road/US58 Business which merges back to US58. The Coutland bypass which separates US58 and the US58 Business removed a significant amount of traffic through the center of Courtland.

SR 35 is designated as a Virginia Byway for its aesthetic, historical, and cultural value. It continues through Southampton County for forty miles to Interstate 95.

Norfolk Southern Railway and CSX Corporation provide freight and piggyback rail services to Southampton County; the railroad junction crosses Route 58 in Courtland and runs north to south.

=== Utilities ===
The Southampton County Department of Public Utilities provides sewer service to Courtland; a waste treatment plant is located outside of the town. The town's water is provided by a separate system. Dominion Energy and the Community Electric Coop provide electricity for Courtland.

=== Services ===
The Courtland Volunteer Rescue Squad provides fire and first responder services.

== Notable people ==
- George B. Cary, United States House of Representatives
- Jim Gillette, professional American football halfback
- John J. Kindred, physician and congressman
- William Mahone, civil engineer, railroad executive, Confederate States Army general, and Virginia politician

== See also ==
- National Register of Historic Places listings in Southampton County, Virginia
- List of Rosenwald schools
- Nat Turner's slave rebellion
