= Virginia's 2nd congressional district =

U.S. House district for Virginia

Coordinates: 37°24′29″N 75°53′13″W

- Interactive map of district boundaries since 2023
- Representative: Jen Kiggans; R–Virginia Beach
- Distribution: 92.57% urban; 7.43% rural
- Population (2025): 797,033
- Median household income: $100,619
- Ethnicity: 58.7% White; 22.0% Black; 7.5% Hispanic; 5.7% Two or more races; 5.3% Asian; 0.9% other
- Cook PVI: EVEN

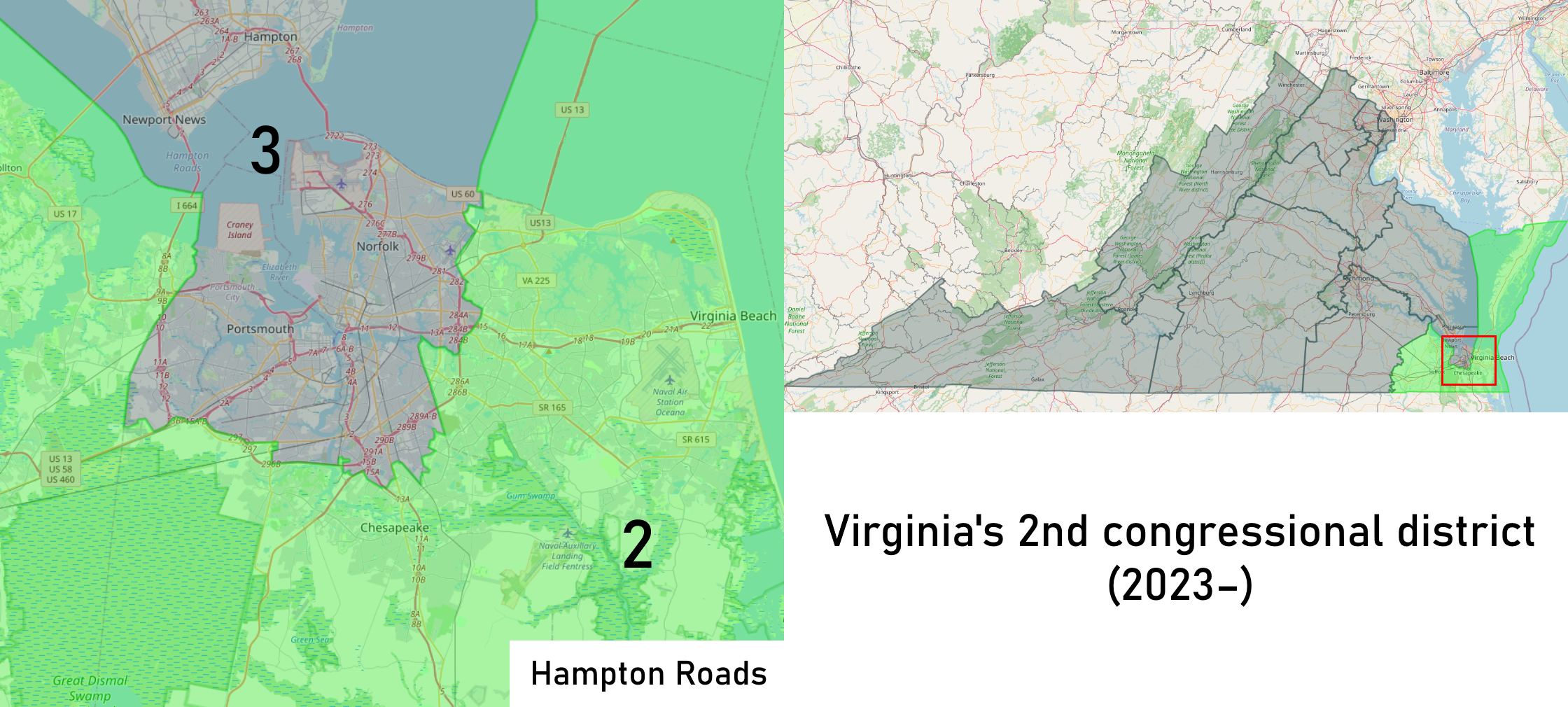
Virginia's 2nd congressional district from January 3, 2023

Virginia's second congressional district is a U.S. congressional district in the Commonwealth of Virginia. It currently encompasses all of the counties of Accomack, Northampton, and Isle of Wight; all of the independent cities of Virginia Beach, Suffolk, and Franklin; part of the independent city of Chesapeake; and part of Southampton County. However, its boundaries have changed greatly over the centuries; it initially encompassed what became West Virginia after the American Civil War. Considered among the nation's most competitive congressional districts, it has been represented by Republican Jen Kiggans since 2023.

The district has a significant military presence. The Hampton Roads area is considered to be a military town.

Republican Scott Rigell defeated Democrat Glenn Nye in the November 2, 2010, election, and took his seat January 3, 2011, serving until 2017, when he was succeeded by Scott Taylor. In the November 6, 2018, election, Democrat Elaine Luria defeated Republican Scott Taylor. In 2022, Luria was defeated by Republican Jen Kiggans, who was then defeated by Luria in a rematch in 2026.

The responsibility of drawing maps for congressional and state legislative districts passed from the Virginia Redistricting Commission (VRC) to the Supreme Court of Virginia in November 2021. The Supreme Court completed redistricting in December 2021, which was used for the 2022 elections.

== Recent election results from statewide races ==
Year	Office	Results
2008	President	McCain 51% - 48%
2008	Senate	Warner 63% - 36%
2009	Governor	McDonnell 63% - 37%
2009	Lt. Governor	Bolling 59% - 41%
2009	Attorney General	Cuccinelli 62% - 38%
2012	President	Romney 51% - 47%
2012	Senate	Allen 50% - 49%
2013	Governor	Cuccinelli 48% - 45%
2013	Lt. Governor	Northam 54% - 46%
2013	Attorney General	Obenshain 54% - 46%
2014	Senate	Gillespie 52% - 46%
2016	President	Trump 50% - 44%
2017	Governor	Northam 50% - 48%
2017	Lt. Governor	Vogel 52% - 48%
2017	Attorney General	Donley Adams 51% - 49%
2018	Senate	Kaine 53% - 45%
2020	President	Biden 50% - 48%
2020	Senate	Warner 52% - 48%
2021	Governor	Youngkin 55% - 44%
2021	Lt. Governor	Earle-Sears 56% - 44%
2021	Attorney General	Miyares 55% - 45%
2024	President	Trump 49.3% - 49.1%
2024	Senate	Kaine 51% - 49%
2025	Governor	Spanberger 54% - 46%
2025	Lt. Governor	Hashmi 51% - 48%
2025	Attorney General	Miyares 50% - 49%

== Composition ==
For the 118th and successive Congresses (based on redistricting following the 2020 census), the district contains all or portions of the following counties and communities:

Accomack County (49)

All 49 communities

Isle of Wight County (7)

All 7 communities

Northampton County (8)

All 8 communities

Southampton County (4)

Courtland, Ivor, Sedley, Southampton Meadows

Independent cities (4)

Chesapeake (part; also 3rd), Franklin, Suffolk, Virginia Beach

== List of members representing the district ==
Representative	Party	Years	Cong ress	Electoral history
District established March 4, 1789
John Brown (Charlottesville)	Anti-Administration	March 4, 1789 – June 1, 1792	1st 2nd	Elected in 1789. Re-elected in 1790. Resigned.
Vacant		June 2, 1792 – March 3, 1793	2nd	
Andrew Moore (Lexington)	Anti-Administration	March 4, 1793 – March 3, 1795	3rd 4th	Redistricted from the 3rd district and re-elected in 1793. Re-elected in 1795. Retired.
Andrew Moore (Lexington)	Democratic-Republican	March 4, 1795 – March 3, 1797	3rd 4th	Redistricted from the 3rd district and re-elected in 1793. Re-elected in 1795. Retired.
David Holmes (Harrisonburg)	Democratic-Republican	March 4, 1797 – March 3, 1803	5th 6th 7th	Elected in 1797. Re-elected in 1799. Re-elected in 1801. Redistricted to the 4th district.
James Stephenson (Martinsburg)	Federalist	March 4, 1803 – March 3, 1805	8th	Elected in 1803. Lost re-election.
John Morrow	Democratic-Republican	March 4, 1805 – March 3, 1809	9th 10th	Elected in 1805. Re-elected in 1807. Lost re-election.
James Stephenson (Martinsburg)	Federalist	March 4, 1809 – March 3, 1811	11th	Elected in 1809. Lost re-election.
John Baker (Shepherdstown)	Federalist	March 4, 1811 – March 3, 1813	12th	Elected in 1811. Retired.
Francis White (Romney)	Federalist	March 4, 1813 – March 3, 1815	13th	Elected in 1813. Lost re-election.
Magnus Tate (Martinsburg)	Federalist	March 4, 1815 – March 3, 1817	14th	Elected in 1815. Retired.
Edward Colston (Martinsburg)	Federalist	March 4, 1817 – March 3, 1819	15th	Elected in 1817. Lost re-election.
Thomas Van Swearingen (Shepherdstown)	Federalist	March 4, 1819 – August 19, 1822	16th 17th	Elected in 1819. Re-elected in 1821. Died.
Vacant		August 19, 1822 – October 28, 1822	17th	
James Stephenson (Martinsburg)	Federalist	October 28, 1822 – March 3, 1823	17th	Elected to finish Van Swearingen's term and seated December 2, 1822. Redistricted to the 16th district.
Arthur Smith (Smithfield)	Democratic-Republican	March 4, 1823 – March 3, 1825	18th	Redistricted from the 20th district and Re-elected in 1823. Retired.
James Trezvant (Jerusalem)	Jacksonian	March 4, 1825 – March 3, 1831	19th 20th 21st	Elected in 1825. Re-elected in 1827. Re-elected in 1829. [data missing]
John Y. Mason (Hicksford)	Jacksonian	March 4, 1831 – January 11, 1837	22nd 23rd 24th	Elected in 1831. Re-elected in 1833. Re-elected in 1835. Resigned.
Vacant		January 12, 1837 – March 3, 1837	24th	
Francis E. Rives (Littleton)	Democratic	March 4, 1837 – March 3, 1841	25th 26th	Elected in 1837. Re-elected in 1839. Retired.
George B. Cary (Bethlehem)	Democratic	March 4, 1841 – March 3, 1843	27th	Elected in 1841. Retired.
George Dromgoole (Summit)	Democratic	March 4, 1843 – April 27, 1847	28th 29th 30th	Elected in 1843. Re-elected in 1845. Re-elected in 1847. Died.
Vacant		April 27, 1847 – August 5, 1847	30th	
Richard K. Meade (Petersburg)	Democratic	August 5, 1847 – March 3, 1853	30th 31st 32nd	Elected to finish Dromgoole's term. Re-elected in 1849. Re-elected in 1851. Lost renomination.
John Millson (Norfolk)	Democratic	March 4, 1853 – March 3, 1861	33rd 34th 35th 36th	Elected in 1853. Re-elected in 1855. Re-elected in 1857. Re-elected in 1859. Retired.
District inactive		March 4, 1861 – January 26, 1870	37th 38th 39th 40th 41st	Civil War and Reconstruction
James H. Platt Jr. (Norfolk)	Republican	January 27, 1870 – March 3, 1875	41st 42nd 43rd	Elected in 1870. Re-elected in 1872. Lost re-election.
John Goode Jr. (Norfolk)	Democratic	March 4, 1875 – March 3, 1881	44th 45th 46th	Elected in 1874. Re-elected in 1876. Re-elected in 1878. Lost re-election.
John F. Dezendorf (Norfolk)	Republican	March 4, 1881 – March 3, 1883	47th	Elected in 1880. Retired.
Harry Libbey (Old Point Comfort)	Readjuster	March 4, 1883 – March 3, 1885	48th 49th	Elected in 1882. [data missing]
Harry Libbey (Old Point Comfort)	Republican	March 4, 1885 – March 3, 1887	48th 49th	Elected in 1884. Lost re-election.
George E. Bowden (Norfolk)	Republican	March 4, 1887 – March 3, 1891	50th 51st	Elected in 1886. Re-elected in 1888. Lost re-election.
John W. Lawson (Isle of Wight)	Democratic	March 4, 1891 – March 3, 1893	52nd	Elected in 1890. Retired.
David Gardiner Tyler (Sturgeon Point)	Democratic	March 4, 1893 – March 3, 1897	53rd 54th	Elected in 1892. Re-elected in 1894. Lost re-election.
William A. Young (Norfolk)	Democratic	March 4, 1897 – April 26, 1898	55th	Election invalidated.
Richard A. Wise (Williamsburg)	Republican	April 26, 1898 – March 3, 1899	55th	Elected in 1898. Lost re-election.
William A. Young (Norfolk)	Democratic	March 4, 1899 – March 12, 1900	56th	Election invalidated
Richard A. Wise (Williamsburg)	Republican	March 12, 1900 – December 21, 1900	56th	Elected in 1900. Died.
Vacant		December 21, 1900 – March 3, 1901	56th	
Harry L. Maynard (Portsmouth)	Democratic	March 4, 1901 – March 3, 1911	57th 58th 59th 60th 61st	Elected in 1900. Re-elected in 1902. Re-elected in 1904. Re-elected in 1906. Re-elected in 1908. Lost re-election.
Edward E. Holland (Suffolk)	Democratic	March 4, 1911 – March 3, 1921	62nd 63rd 64th 65th 66th	Elected in 1910. Re-elected in 1912. Re-elected in 1914. Re-elected in 1916. Re-elected in 1918. Retired.
Joseph T. Deal (Norfolk)	Democratic	March 4, 1921 – March 3, 1929	67th 68th 69th 70th	Elected in 1920. Re-elected in 1922. Re-elected in 1924. Re-elected in 1926. Lost re-election.
Menalcus Lankford (Norfolk)	Republican	March 4, 1929 – March 3, 1933	71st 72nd	Elected in 1928. Re-elected in 1930. Lost re-election.
District inactive		March 4, 1933 – January 3, 1935	73rd	
Colgate Darden (Norfolk)	Democratic	January 3, 1935 – January 3, 1937	74th	Elected in 1934. Lost renomination.
Norman R. Hamilton (Portsmouth)	Democratic	January 3, 1937 – January 3, 1939	75th	Elected in 1936. Lost renomination.
Colgate Darden (Norfolk)	Democratic	January 3, 1939 – March 1, 1941	76th 77th	Elected in 1938. Re-elected in 1940. Resigned to run for Governor of Virginia.
Vacant		March 1, 1941 – April 8, 1941	77th	
Winder R. Harris (Norfolk)	Democratic	April 8, 1941 – September 15, 1944	77th 78th	Elected to finish Darden's term. Re-elected in 1942. Resigned.
Vacant		September 15, 1944 – November 7, 1944	78th	
Ralph H. Daughton (Norfolk)	Democratic	November 7, 1944 – January 3, 1947	78th 79th	Elected to finish Harris' term. Simultaneously elected to a full term in 1944. Lost renomination.
Porter Hardy Jr. (Portsmouth)	Democratic	January 3, 1947 – January 3, 1969	80th 81st 82nd 83rd 84th 85th 86th 87th 88th 89th 90th	Elected in 1946. Re-elected in 1948. Re-elected in 1950. Re-elected in 1952. Re-elected in 1954. Re-elected in 1956. Re-elected in 1958. Re-elected in 1960. Re-elected in 1962. Re-elected in 1964. Re-elected in 1966. Retired.
G. William Whitehurst (Norfolk)	Republican	January 3, 1969 – January 3, 1987	91st 92nd 93rd 94th 95th 96th 97th 98th 99th	Elected in 1968. Re-elected in 1970. Re-elected in 1972. Re-elected in 1974. Re-elected in 1976. Re-elected in 1978. Re-elected in 1980. Re-elected in 1982. Re-elected in 1984. Retired.
Owen B. Pickett (Virginia Beach)	Democratic	January 3, 1987 – January 3, 2001	100th 101st 102nd 103rd 104th 105th 106th	Elected in 1986. Re-elected in 1988. Re-elected in 1990. Re-elected in 1992. Re-elected in 1994. Re-elected in 1996. Re-elected in 1998. Retired.
Ed Schrock (Virginia Beach)	Republican	January 3, 2001 – January 3, 2005	107th 108th	Elected in 2000. Re-elected in 2002. Retired.
Thelma Drake (Norfolk)	Republican	January 3, 2005 – January 3, 2009	109th 110th	Elected in 2004. Re-elected in 2006. Lost re-election.
Glenn Nye (Norfolk)	Democratic	January 3, 2009 – January 3, 2011	111th	Elected in 2008. Lost re-election.
Scott Rigell (Virginia Beach)	Republican	January 3, 2011 – January 3, 2017	112th 113th 114th	Elected in 2010. Re-elected in 2012. Re-elected in 2014. Retired.
Scott Taylor (Virginia Beach)	Republican	January 3, 2017 – January 3, 2019	115th	Elected in 2016. Lost re-election.
Elaine Luria (Norfolk)	Democratic	January 3, 2019 – January 3, 2023	116th 117th	Elected in 2018. Re-elected in 2020. Lost re-election.
Jen Kiggans (Virginia Beach)	Republican	January 3, 2023 – present	118th 119th	Elected in 2022. Re-elected in 2024. Lost re-election.
Elaine Luria (Norfolk)	Democratic	Assuming office on January 3, 2027		Elected in 2026.

== Election results ==
=== 1980s ===
Virginia's 2nd congressional district election, 1980
Party	Candidate	Votes	%
Republican	G. William Whitehurst (incumbent)	97,319	89.84%
Independent	Kenneth P. Morrison	11,003	10.16%
Write-in		6	0.01%
Total votes		108,328	100%
Republican hold			

Virginia's 2nd congressional district election, 1982
Party	Candidate	Votes	%
Republican	G. William Whitehurst (incumbent)	78,108	99.88%
Write-in		97	0.12%
Total votes		78,205	100%
Republican hold			

Virginia's 2nd congressional district election, 1984
Party	Candidate	Votes	%
Republican	G. William Whitehurst (incumbent)	136,632	99.81%
Write-in		256	0.19%
Total votes		136,888	100%
Republican hold			

Virginia's 2nd congressional district election, 1986
Party	Candidate	Votes	%
Democratic	Owen B. Pickett	54,491	49.46%
Republican	A. Joe Canada Jr.	46,137	41.88%
Independent	Stephen P. Shao	9,492	8.62%
Write-in		49	0.04%
Total votes		110,169	100%
Democratic gain from Republican			

Virginia's 2nd congressional district election, 1988
Party	Candidate	Votes	%
Democratic	Owen B. Pickett (incumbent)	106,666	60.53%
Republican	Jerry R. Curry	62,564	35.51%
Independent	Stephen P. Shao	4,255	2.41%
Independent	Robert A. Smith	2,691	1.53%
Write-in		32	0.02%
Total votes		176,208	100%
Democratic hold			

=== 1990s ===
Virginia's 2nd congressional district election, 1990
Party	Candidate	Votes	%
Democratic	Owen B. Pickett (incumbent)	55,179	74.95%
Independent	Harry G. Broskie	15,915	21.62%
Write-in		2,524	3.43%
Total votes		73,618	100%
Democratic hold			

Virginia's 2nd congressional district election, 1992
Party	Candidate	Votes	%
Democratic	Owen B. Pickett (incumbent)	99,253	56.03%
Republican	J. L. Chapman IV	77,797	43.92%
Write-in		83	0.05%
Total votes		177,133	100%
Democratic hold			

Virginia's 2nd congressional district election, 1994
Party	Candidate	Votes	%
Democratic	Owen B. Pickett (incumbent)	81,372	59.05%
Republican	J. L. Chapman IV	56,375	40.91%
Write-in		55	0.04%
Total votes		137,802	100%
Democratic hold			

Virginia's 2nd congressional district election, 1996
Party	Candidate	Votes	%
Democratic	Owen B. Pickett (incumbent)	106,215	64.77%
Republican	John F. Tate	57,586	35.11%
Write-in		195	0.12%
Total votes		163,996	100%
Democratic hold			

Virginia's 2nd congressional district election, 1998
Party	Candidate	Votes	%
Democratic	Owen B. Pickett (incumbent)	67,975	94.29%
Write-in		4,116	5.71%
Total votes		72,091	100%
Democratic hold			

=== 2000s ===
Virginia's 2nd congressional district election, 2000
Party	Candidate	Votes	%
Republican	Edward L. Schrock	97,856	51.96%
Democratic	Jody M. Wagner	90,328	47.96%
Write-in		145	0.08%
Total votes		188,329	100%
Republican gain from Democratic			

Virginia's 2nd congressional district election, 2002
Party	Candidate	Votes	%
Republican	Edward L. Schrock (incumbent)	103,807	83.15%
Green	D. C. Amarasinghe	20,589	16.49%
Write-in		450	0.36%
Total votes		124,846	100%
Republican hold			

Virginia's 2nd congressional district election, 2004
Party	Candidate	Votes	%
Republican	Thelma D. Drake	132,946	55.08%
Democratic	David B. Ashe	108,180	44.82%
Write-in		254	0.11%
Total votes		241,380	100%
Republican hold			

Virginia's 2nd congressional district election, 2006
Party	Candidate	Votes	%
Republican	Thelma D. Drake (incumbent)	88,777	51.27%
Democratic	Phil Kellam	83,901	48.45%
Write-in		481	0.28%
Total votes		173,159	100%
Republican hold			

Virginia's 2nd congressional district election, 2008
Party	Candidate	Votes	%
Democratic	Glenn Nye	141,857	52.40%
Republican	Thelma D. Drake (incumbent)	128,486	47.46%
Write-in		368	0.14%
Total votes		270,711	100%
Democratic gain from Republican			

=== 2010s ===
Virginia's 2nd congressional district election, 2010
Party	Candidate	Votes	%
Republican	E. Scott Rigell	88,340	53.12%
Democratic	Glenn Nye (incumbent)	70,591	42.45%
Independent	Kenny E. Golden	7,194	4.33%
Write-in		164	0.10%
Total votes		166,289	100%
Republican gain from Democratic			

Virginia's 2nd congressional district election, 2012
Party	Candidate	Votes	%
Republican	E. Scott Rigell (incumbent)	166,231	53.76%
Democratic	Paul O. Hirschbiel, Jr.	142,548	46.10%
Write-in		443	0.14%
Total votes		309,222	100%
Republican hold			

Virginia's 2nd congressional district election, 2014
Party	Candidate	Votes	%
Republican	E. Scott Rigell (incumbent)	101,558	58.68%
Democratic	Suzanne Patrick	71,178	41.13%
Write-in		324	0.19%
Total votes		173,060	100%
Republican hold			

Virginia's 2nd congressional district election, 2016
Party	Candidate	Votes	%
Republican	Scott Taylor	190,475	61.33%
Democratic	Shaun D. Brown	119,440	38.46%
	Write-in	652	0.21%
Total votes		310,567	100.00%
Republican hold			

Virginia's 2nd congressional district election, 2018
Party	Candidate	Votes	%
Democratic	Elaine Luria	139,571	51.05%
Republican	Scott Taylor (incumbent)	133,458	48.81%
	Write-in	371	0.14%
Total votes		273,400	100.00%
Democratic gain from Republican			

=== 2020s ===
Virginia's 2nd congressional district election, 2020
Party	Candidate	Votes	%
Democratic	Elaine Luria (incumbent)	185,733	51.55%
Republican	Scott Taylor	165,031	45.81%
Independent	David Foster	9,170	2.55%
	Write-in	343	0.10%
Total votes		360,277	100%
Democratic hold			

Virginia's 2nd congressional district election, 2022
Party	Candidate	Votes	%
Republican	Jen Kiggans	153,328	51.6%
Democratic	Elaine Luria (incumbent)	143,219	48.2%
Write-in		449	0.2%
Total votes		296,996	100%
Republican gain from Democratic			

Virginia's 2nd congressional district election, 2024
Party	Candidate	Votes	%
Republican	Jen Kiggans (incumbent)	207,368	50.7%
Democratic	Missy Cotter Smasal	191,666	46.9%
Independent	Robert Reid	9,197	2.3%
Write-ins		471	0.1%
Total votes		408,702	100%
Republican hold			

== Historical district boundaries ==
The Virginia Second District started in 1788, covering the counties of Mercer, Jefferson, Fayette, Bourbon, Lincoln, Nelson and Madison.

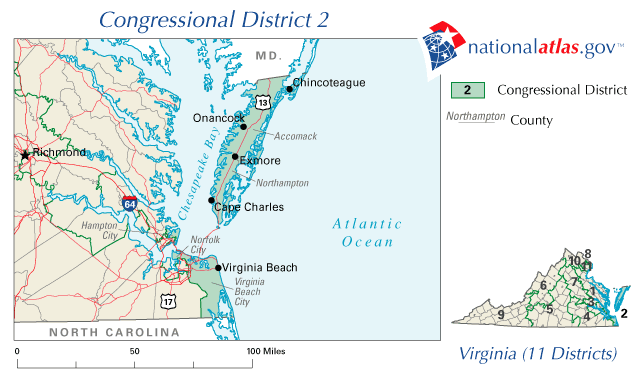
2003–2013

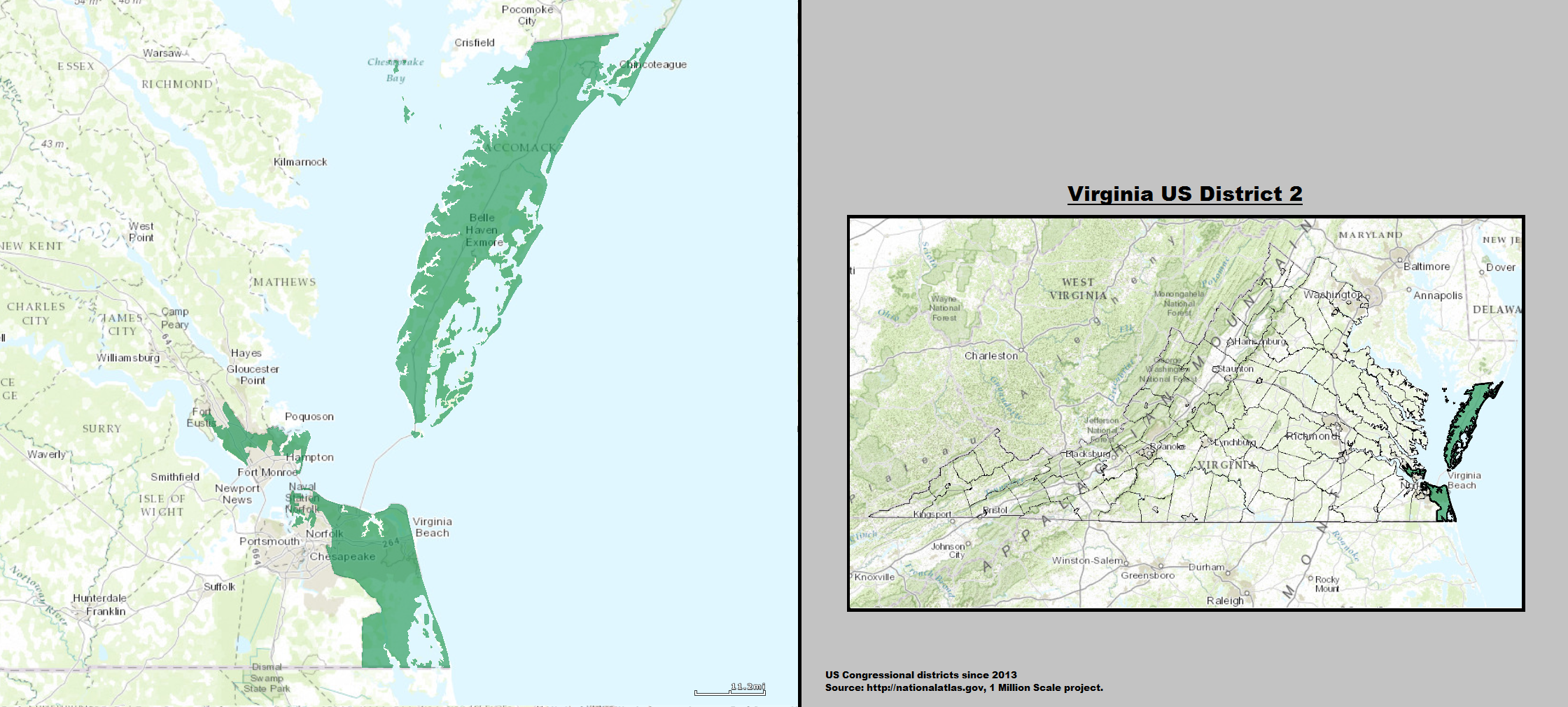
2013–2017

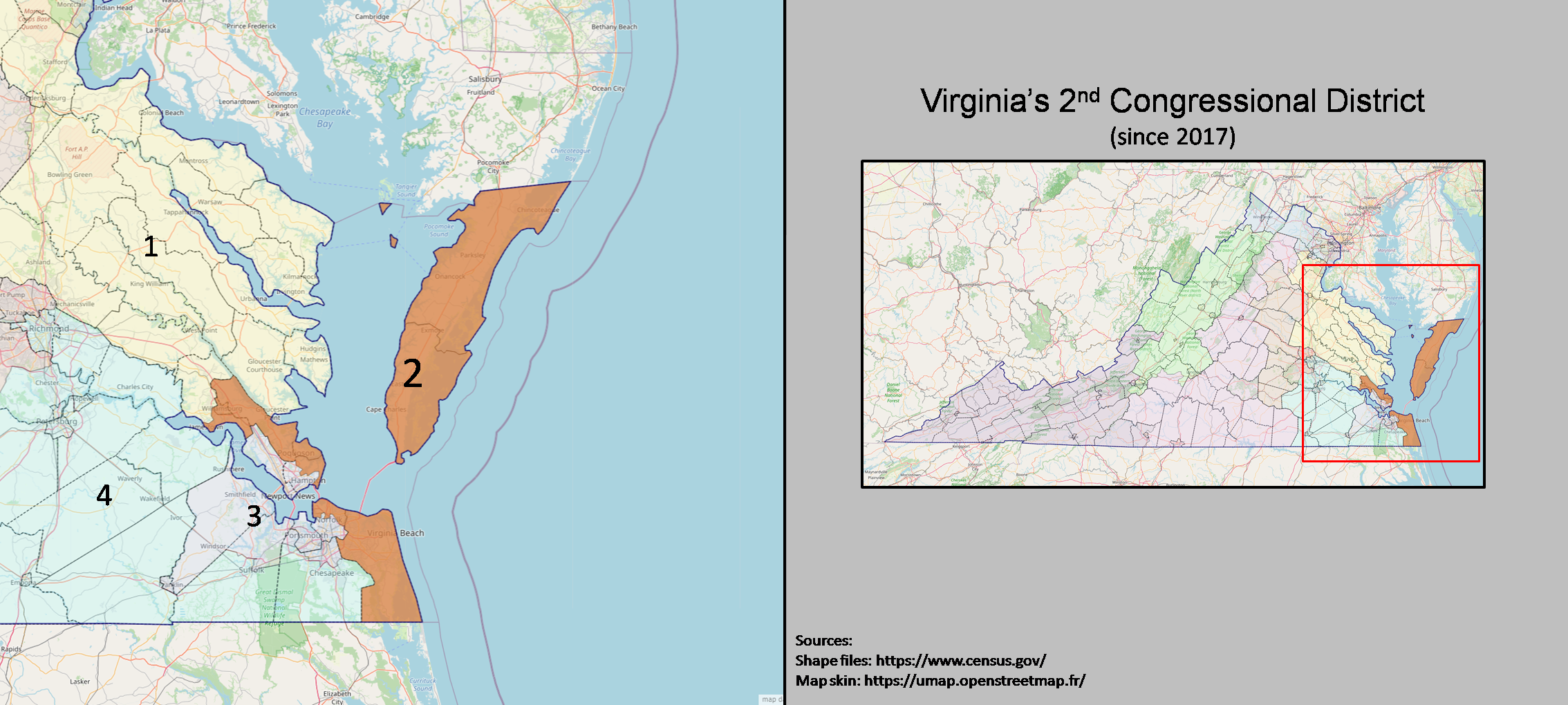
2017–2023

== See also ==
- Virginia's congressional districts
- List of United States congressional districts
