= Benjamin Blunt =

Benjamin Blunt may refer to:

- Benjamin Blunt (patriot) (1734–1799), planter, patriot and politician, member of the Virginia House of Delegates
- Benjamin Blunt Jr. (1762–1827), horse breeder and politician, member of the Virginia House of Delegates
