= John W. Lawson =

American politician

John Williams Lawson
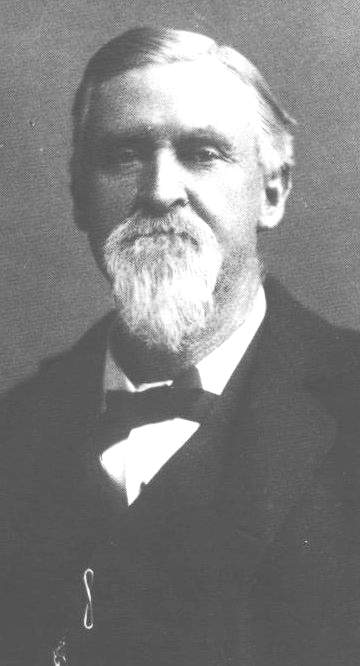

Member of the U.S. House of Representatives from Virginia's 2nd district
- In office March 4, 1891 – March 3, 1893
- Preceded by: George E. Bowden
- Succeeded by: D. Gardiner Tyler

Member of the Virginia House of Delegates from Isle of Wight County
- In office 1884–1885
- Preceded by: Irvin W. Duck
- Succeeded by: James Chalmers
- In office 1869–1873
- Preceded by: District established
- Succeeded by: George Jordan

Member of the Virginia Senate from Isle of Wight, Nansemond and Southampton Counties
- In office 1874–1877
- Preceded by: Samuel Boykin
- Succeeded by: Kenneth Griffin

Personal details
- Born: September 13, 1837 James City County, Virginia
- Died: February 21, 1905 (aged 67) Smithfield, Virginia
- Resting place: Ivy Hill Cemetery, Smithfield, Virginia
- Party: Democratic
- Education: College of William and Mary; University of Virginia; University of the City of New York
- Profession: physician, farmer

Military service
- Allegiance: Confederate States of America
- Branch/service: Confederate Army
- Years of service: 1861–1865
- Rank: Surgeon
- Unit: 32nd Virginia Infantry, Army of Northern Virginia
- Battles/wars: American Civil War

John William Lawson (September 13, 1837 – February 21, 1905) was a U.S. representative from Virginia.

== Biography ==
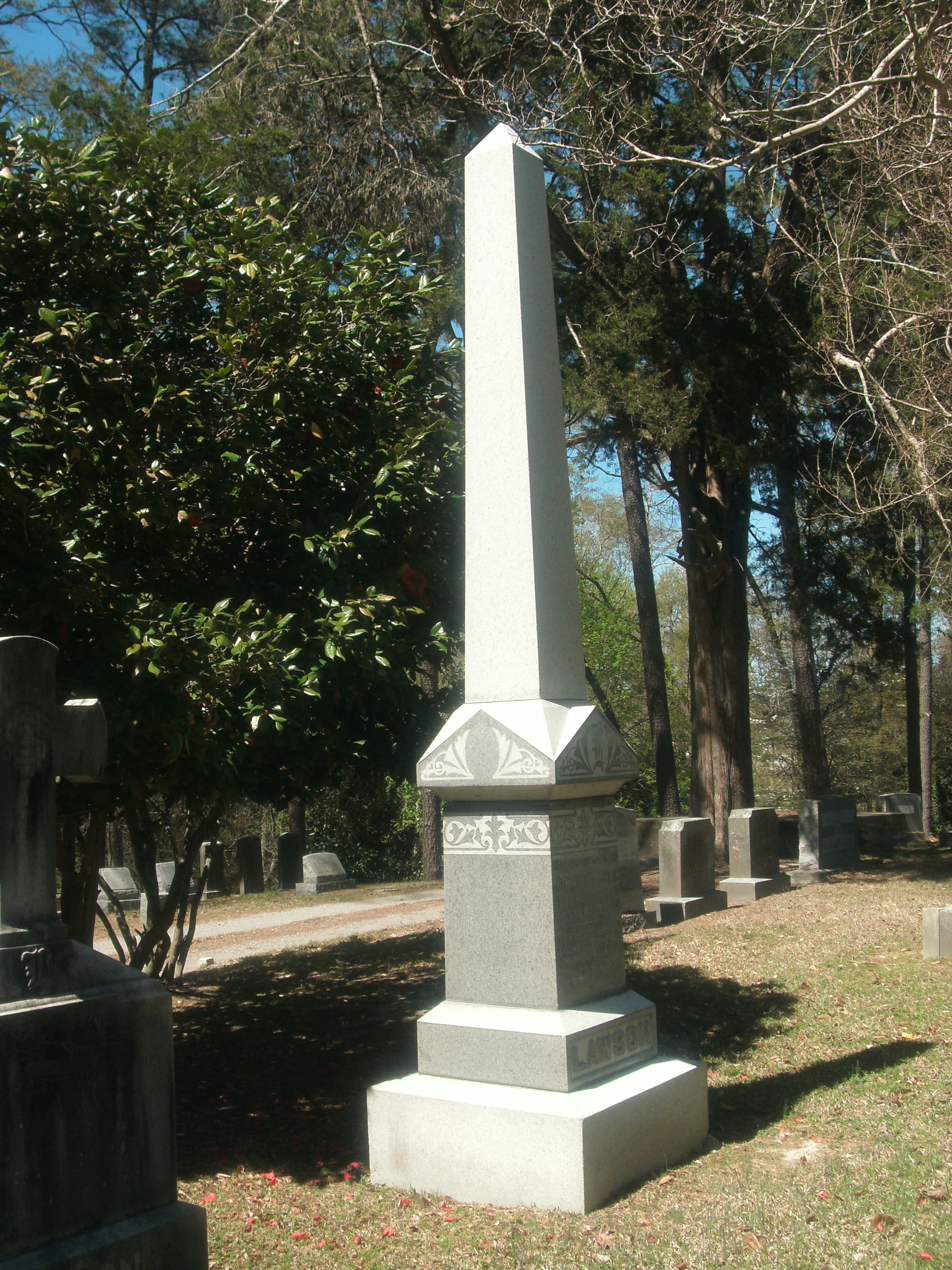
Lawson's grave at Ivy Hill Cemetery

Born in James City County, Virginia, Lawson attended the schools of Williamsburg, the College of William and Mary, and the University of Virginia at Charlottesville. He studied medicine. He was graduated from the University of the City of New York, March 4, 1861. He returned to Virginia, and during the Civil War enlisted in the Thirty-second Regiment of Virginia Infantry, Confederate States Army. He served as assistant surgeon in charge of Artillery battalion. He was promoted to surgeon March 10, 1864, and served until the surrender at Appomattox April 9, 1865. He settled in Isle of Wight County, Virginia, December 1865. Practiced medicine for ten years, when he engaged in agricultural pursuits. He served as member of the State house of delegates in 1869–1873. He served in the State senate in 1874–1877. He was again a member of the State house of delegates in 1883 and 1884.

Lawson was elected as a Democrat to the Fifty-second Congress (March 4, 1891 – March 3, 1893). He was not a candidate for renomination in 1892. He resumed farming. He served as delegate to the State constitutional convention in 1901 and 1902. He died in Smithfield, Virginia, on February 21, 1905. He was interred in Ivy Hill Cemetery.

== Electoral history ==
1890; Lawson was elected to the U.S. House of Representatives defeating Republican George Edwin Bowden and Independent Republican C.W. Murdaugh, winning 50.71% of the vote.

== Sources ==
- United States Congress. "John W. Lawson (id: L000145)". Biographical Directory of the United States Congress.

U.S. House of Representatives
Preceded by George E. Bowden	Member of the U.S. House of Representatives from Virginia's 2nd congressional district 1891–1893	Succeeded by D. Gardiner Tyler
