= David Gardiner Tyler =

American politician

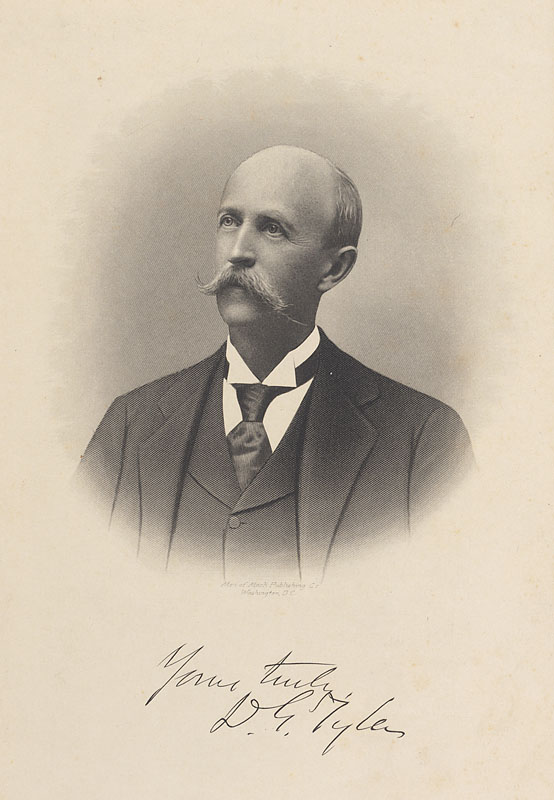

Member of the U.S. House of Representatives from Virginia's 2nd district
- In office March 4, 1893 – March 3, 1897
- Preceded by: John W. Lawson
- Succeeded by: William A. Young

Member of the Virginia Senate from the 38th district
- In office December 6, 1899 – January 13, 1904
- Preceded by: Manly H. Barnes
- Succeeded by: George W. Anderson; Arthur C. Harman
- In office December 2, 1891 – December 6, 1893
- Preceded by: L. M. Nance
- Succeeded by: Manly H. Barnes

Personal details
- Born: July 12, 1846 East Hampton, New York
- Died: September 5, 1927 (aged 81) Sherwood Forest Plantation, Charles City County, Virginia
- Resting place: Hollywood Cemetery, Richmond, Virginia
- Party: Democratic
- Spouse: Mary Morris Jones
- Children: Mary; Margaret; David; James; John
- Parent(s): John Tyler; Julia Gardiner Tyler
- Education: Washington College
- Profession: lawyer, judge

Military service
- Allegiance: Confederate States
- Branch/service: Confederate States Army
- Years of service: 1863–1865
- Rank: Private
- Unit: Rockbridge Artillery
- Battles/wars: American Civil War

David Gardiner Tyler (July 12, 1846 – September 5, 1927) was an American politician and the ninth child and fourth son of John Tyler, the tenth president of the United States.

Born in New York, Tyler went to school in Virginia and fought in the Confederate Army during the American Civil War. After attending college in Germany and Virginia, he became a lawyer. He later served in the Virginia State Senate, as a member of the United States House of Representatives from Virginia's 2nd congressional district, and as a Virginia Circuit Court judge.

== Early life ==
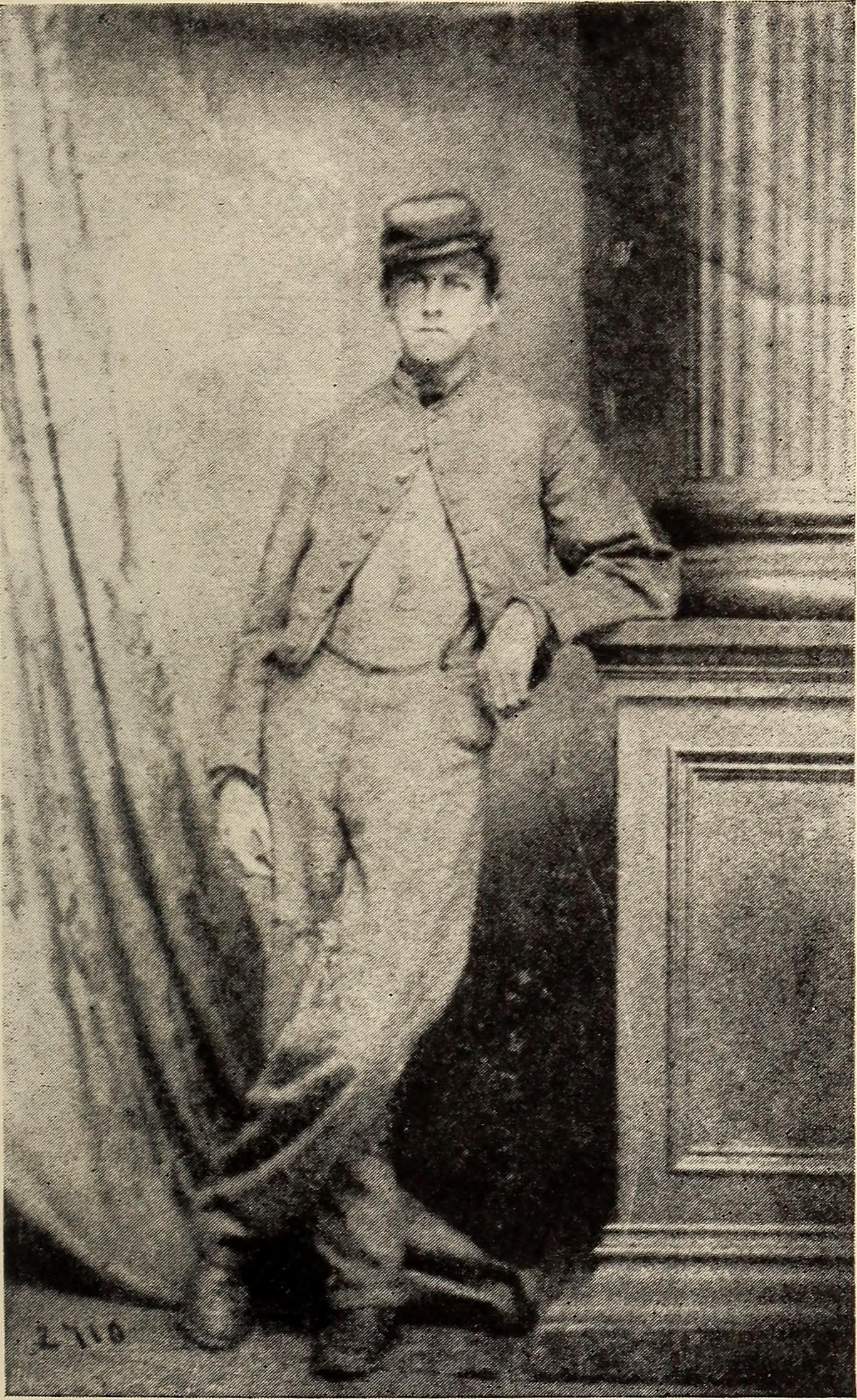
A young Tyler in a Civil War uniform

Tyler was born in East Hampton, New York, and was the first child born to former United States president John Tyler and his second wife, Julia Gardiner Tyler. He was named after his late maternal grandfather, David Gardiner. As a child, he attended private schools in Charles City County, Virginia.

Following his father's death in 1862, he entered present-day Washington and Lee University, where he was a member of Phi Kappa Psi fraternity, but dropped out the following year to fight in the Confederate Army during the American Civil War. He was present at the surrender of Robert E. Lee at Appomattox Court House in 1865. Following the war, he and his brother, John Alexander Tyler, traveled to Germany, and attended school in the Grand Duchy of Baden. He returned to the United States, and graduated from the Washington and Lee School of Law in 1869.

== Career ==
From 1870 to 1884, Tyler practiced law in Richmond, Virginia, before accepting an appointment as director of the state lunatic asylum in Williamsburg, Virginia, serving until 1887. From 1891 to 1892, he served in the Virginia State Senate, and on the Board of Visitors of the College of William and Mary.

In 1892, Tyler was first elected to the United States House of Representatives as the representative for Virginia's 2nd congressional district, defeating independent Republicans P. C. Garrigan and John F. Deyendorf, H. S. Collier, and independent George E. Bowden. He won 55.61 percent of the vote.

Tyler began serving in the House in 1893. In 1894, he was reelected, defeating Republican Thomas R. Borland and independent T. J. Edwards, and winning 56.27 percent of the vote. However, Tyler was defeated for renomination in 1896. He subsequently left the House in 1897 and returned to private law practice until his reelection to the state Senate, where he served from 1900 to 1904. From 1904 until his death in 1927, he served as a Virginia Circuit Court judge.

== Personal life ==
Tyler was married to Mary Morris Jones (1865–1931). Together, they were the parents of five children, four of whom survived to adulthood:

- Mary Lyon Tyler (1895–1975), who married George Peterkin Gamble (1899–1986).
- Margaret Gardiner Tyler (1897–1981), who married Stephen F. Chadwick (1894–1975), grandson of Stephen F. Chadwick, the fifth governor of Oregon.
- David Gardiner Tyler Jr. (1899–1993), who married Anne Morton Shelton (1900–1977).
- James Alfred Jones Tyler (1902–1972), who married Katherine Thomason (1909–1967).
- John Tyler (1905–1907), who died young.

Tyler died at Sherwood Forest Plantation and is buried at Hollywood Cemetery in Richmond.

U.S. House of Representatives
| Preceded by John W. Lawson | Member of the U.S. House of Representatives from Virginia's 2nd congressional district 1893–1897 | Succeeded by William A. Young |
