= Bill Bailey (dancer) =

American tap dancer (1912–1978)

Willie Eugene Bailey (December 8, 1912 – December 12, 1978), known professionally as Bill Bailey, was an American tap dancer. The older brother of actress and singer Pearl Bailey, Bill was considered to be one of the best rhythm dancers of his time and was the first person to be recorded doing the Moonwalk, although he referred to it as the "Backslide," in the film Cabin in the Sky (1943), starring Ethel Waters, Eddie "Rochester" Anderson and Lena Horne.

== Early life ==
Bill Bailey was born Willie Eugene Bailey in the small town of Sedley, Virginia in Southampton County, Virginia to Joseph James Bailey and Ella Mae Ricks Bailey. He was named after Eugenia V. Turner who was a midwife in the county that helped deliver him. He spent his adolescence in Newport News, Virginia and Philadelphia. His father, Reverend Bailey, raised all his children Christian and hoped that Bill would also choose to become a minister.

== Career ==
At eighteen years old, Bailey was discovered in New York by Lew Leslie and put in his production Blackbirds of 1930. After the production, he and Derby Wilson, another prominent taps act, formed a team that challenged each other at the Cotton Club and toured with Duke Ellington when his band traveled to Europe in 1933.

Bailey was often compared to Bill "Bojangles" Robinson, whom he considered a mentor and friend. Once Bailey and Wilson went solo, Bailey continued to be booked as a Bill Robinson imitation act, often standing in for Robinson when he was away filming. Black press at the time regularly predicted that Bailey would follow Robinson into film stardom.

For much of his career, the "backslide," later known as the "moonwalk," was his signature exit. Its first recording was during his routine during "Taking A Chance On Love," sung by star Ethel Waters in the 1943 musical film Cabin in the Sky. He also performed in the black musical short, Harlem Variety Revue, 1950-1954 (1955), in the films Going Native (1936), The World Is Waiting for the Sunrise (1952), The Rhythm and Blues Revue (1955), and Showtime at the Apollo (1955).

In 1946, as nightclubs and theaters begin to close, and after struggles with drug addiction, Bailey left show business to study religion and open a church in Harlem near the Apollo Theater. He says he heard a voice that called him away from sin and toward a life of evangelizing among those he once worked with. At the time, he was making $1000 per week performing. For this reason, prominent figures in the entertainment industry were shocked at this sudden career change and doubted it would last but many came to support him once they heard him preach. Duke Ellington, Cab Calloway, and Count Basie are a few of the celebrities who supported his religious efforts. Bailey aspired to ultimately start a church in New York that appealed to entertainers.

In February 1949, Bailey declined an offer to play Bill "Bojangles" Robinson in a film about his life, stating that "It just wasn't for me. God is my only support now." He would later return to the stage to support his ministry but mostly as an added attraction to his sister's act.

== Personal life and death ==
He was married to Pernell Bailey, and they had a large family. He died on December 12, 1978, in Philadelphia, four days after his 66th birthday.
