= 1988 United States House of Representatives elections in Virginia =

- November 8, 1988

All ten Virginia seats to the United States House of Representatives
	Majority party	Minority party
Party	Republican	Democratic
Last election	5	5
Seats won	5	5
Seat change	Steady	Steady
Republican
60–70%
70–80%
90–100%
Democratic
50–60%
60–70%
90–100%

The 1988 United States House of Representatives elections in Virginia were held on November 8, 1988, to determine who will represent the Commonwealth of Virginia in the United States House of Representatives. Virginia had ten seats in the House, apportioned according to the 1980 United States census. Representatives are elected for two-year terms. During the November elections, every incumbent Virginia representative was re-elected.

== Overview ==
United States House of Representatives elections in Virginia, 1988
Party	Votes	Percentage	Seats
Republican	1,076,895	56.95%	5
Democratic	801,831	42.41%	5
Independents	10,738	0.57%	0
Write-ins	1,364	0.07%	0
Totals	1,890,828	100.00%	10

== 1st district ==
Candidate	Campaign committee			
Candidate	Raised	Spent	COH	L&D
Herbert H. Bateman	$293,109.00	$284,702.00	$39,534.00	$1,137.00
James Ellenson	$30,454.00	$30,302.00	$0.00	$0.00

1988 Virginia 1st congressional district election
Party	Candidate	Votes	%
Republican	Herbert H. Bateman (incumbent)	135,937	73.25
Democratic	James S. Ellenson	49,614	26.74
Write-in		22	0.01
Total votes		185,573	100.00
Republican hold			

== 2nd district ==
Curry, who was black, received 8.5% of the black vote.

Candidate	Campaign committee			
Candidate	Raised	Spent	COH	L&D
Jerry Curry	$149,958.00	$148,856.00	$4,726.00	$0.00
Owen B. Pickett	$437,439.00	$414,011.00	$28,550.00	$6,711.00
Stephen P. Shao	$15,424.00	$15,424.00	$0.00	$0.00
Robert Alexander Smith	$9,500.00	$9,135.00	$363.00	$0.00

1988 Virginia 2nd congressional district election
Party	Candidate	Votes	%
Democratic	Owen B. Pickett (incumbent)	106,666	60.53
Republican	Jerry Curry	62,564	35.51
Independent	Stephen P. Shao	4,255	2.41
Independent	Robert A. Smith	2,691	1.53
Write-in		32	0.02
Total votes		176,208	100.00
Democratic hold			

== 3rd district ==
Candidate	Campaign committee			
Candidate	Raised	Spent	COH	L&D
Thomas J. Bliley Jr.	$467,449.00	$366,816.00	$108,636.00	$0.00

1988 Virginia 3rd congressional district election
Party	Candidate	Votes	%
Republican	Thomas J. Bliley Jr. (incumbent)	187,354	99.71
Write-in		544	0.29
Total votes		187,898	100.00
Republican hold			

== 4th district ==
Candidate	Campaign committee			
Candidate	Raised	Spent	COH	L&D
Norman Sisisky	$185,555.00	$93,232.00	$316,592.00	$349,183.00

1988 Virginia 4th congressional district election
Party	Candidate	Votes	%
Democratic	Norman Sisisky (incumbent)	134,786	99.93
Write-in		98	0.07
Total votes		134,884	100.00
Democratic hold			

== 5th district ==
Lewis F. Payne Jr. won election to the U.S. House in a special election held on June 14, 1988, following the death of Dan Daniel. Linda Lugenia Arey, a former White House aide, won the Republican nomination against W. Onico Barker. Jerry Falwell supported Arey due to Barker opposing a tax break for Liberty University, Following her defeat Arey withdrew from the general election and was replaced by Charles R. Hawkins.

Payne was the only incumbent U.S. Representative in Virginia to receive less than 60% of the vote.

Candidate	Campaign committee			
Candidate	Raised	Spent	COH	L&D
Linda Lugenia Arey	$405,046.00	$404,468.00	$577.00	$0.00
W. Onico Barker	$19,326.00	$19,325.00	$0.00	$0.00
James Francis Cole	$10,655.00	$10,429.00	$87.00	$3,560.00
Charles R. Hawkins	$105,871.00	$105,872.00	$0.00	$0.00
James Ronald Millner	$11,665.00	$11,664.00	$0.00	$0.00
Lewis F. Payne Jr.	$915,853.00	$903,976.00	$9,041.00	$275,000.00

1988 Virginia 5th congressional district special election
Party	Candidate	Votes	%
Democratic	Lewis F. Payne Jr.	55,469	59.25
Republican	Linda L. Arey	38,063	40.66
Write-in		80	0.09
Total votes		93,612	100.00
Democratic hold			

1988 Virginia 5th congressional district election
Party	Candidate	Votes	%
Democratic	Lewis F. Payne Jr. (incumbent)	97,242	54.19
Republican	Charles R. Hawkins	78,396	43.69
Independent	James Frank Cole	3,792	2.11
Write-in		12	0.01
Total votes		179,442	100.00
Democratic hold			

== 6th district ==
Candidate	Campaign committee			
Candidate	Raised	Spent	COH	L&D
Charles Judd	$112,076.00	$110,756.00	$1,318.00	$5,560.00
Jim Olin	$321,705.00	$322,160.00	$11,751.00	$22,000.00

1988 Virginia 6th congressional district election
Party	Candidate	Votes	%
Democratic	Jim Olin (incumbent)	118,369	63.88
Republican	Charles E. Judd	66,935	36.12
Write-in		8	0.00
Total votes		185,304	100.00
Democratic hold			

== 7th district ==
Candidate	Campaign committee			
Candidate	Raised	Spent	COH	L&D
D. French Slaughter Jr.	$219,559.00	$87,195.00	$180,208.00	$0.00

1988 Virginia 7th congressional district election
Party	Candidate	Votes	%
Republican	D. French Slaughter Jr. (incumbent)	136,988	99.65
Write-in		488	0.35
Total votes		137,476	100.00
Republican hold			

== 8th district ==
Candidate	Campaign committee			
Candidate	Raised	Spent	COH	L&D
David Brickley	$276,578.00	$273,203.00	$3,375.00	$9,000.00
Stanford Parris	$632,755.00	$689,035.00	$158,614.00	$2,261.00
Gary Slaiman	$13,325.00	$13,179.00	$144.00	$0.00
Alfonso Ignacio Vergara	$8,260.00	$7,034.00	$1,224.00	$2,217.00

1988 Virginia 8th congressional district election
Party	Candidate	Votes	%
Republican	Stanford Parris (incumbent)	154,761	62.30
Democratic	David G. Brickley	93,561	37.67
Write-in		78	0.03
Total votes		248,400	100.00
Republican hold			

== 9th district ==
Candidate	Campaign committee			
Candidate	Raised	Spent	COH	L&D
Rick Boucher	$616,821.00	$606,420.00	$130,299.00	$0.00
John C. Brown	$155,094.00	$154,515.00	$579.00	$14,280.00

1988 Virginia 9th congressional district election
Party	Candidate	Votes	%
Democratic	Rick Boucher (incumbent)	113,309	63.40
Republican	John C. Brown	65,410	36.60
Write-in		8	0.00
Total votes		178,727	100.00
Democratic hold			

== 10th district ==
Only 2.7% of registered voters participated in the Democratic primary.

Candidate	Campaign committee			
Candidate	Raised	Spent	COH	L&D
Mackenzie Canter III	$38,514.00	$38,513.00	$0.00	$0.00
Robert Lester Weinberg	$242,787.00	$241,445.00	$1,339.00	$7,816.00
Frank Wolf	$803,080.00	$758,365.00	$57,022.00	$0.00

1988 Virginia 10th congressional district Democratic primary
Party	Candidate	Votes	%
Democratic	Robert Lester Weinberg	6,880	76.78
Democratic	N. Mackenzie Canter, III	2,081	23.22
Total votes		8,961	100.00

1988 Virginia 10th congressional district election
Party	Candidate	Votes	%
Republican	Frank Wolf (incumbent)	188,550	68.09
Democratic	Robert Lester Weinberg	88,284	31.88
Write-in		74	0.03
Total votes		276,908	100.00
Republican hold			

== Works cited ==
- Moreland, Laurence; Steed, Robert; Baker, Tod, eds. (1991). The 1988 Presidential Election in the South: Continuity Amidst Change in Southern Party Politics. Praeger Publishers. ISBN 0275931455.

== See also ==
- United States House elections, 1988
