= Benjamin Hicks =

Benjamin Hicks may refer to:

- Benjamin Hicks (politician), American politician from New York
- Benjamin F. Hicks (1847–1925), American inventor

== See also ==
- Benjamin Hick (1790–1842), English civil and mechanical engineer, art collector and patron
