= Harry Libbey =

American politician

Harrison Libbey
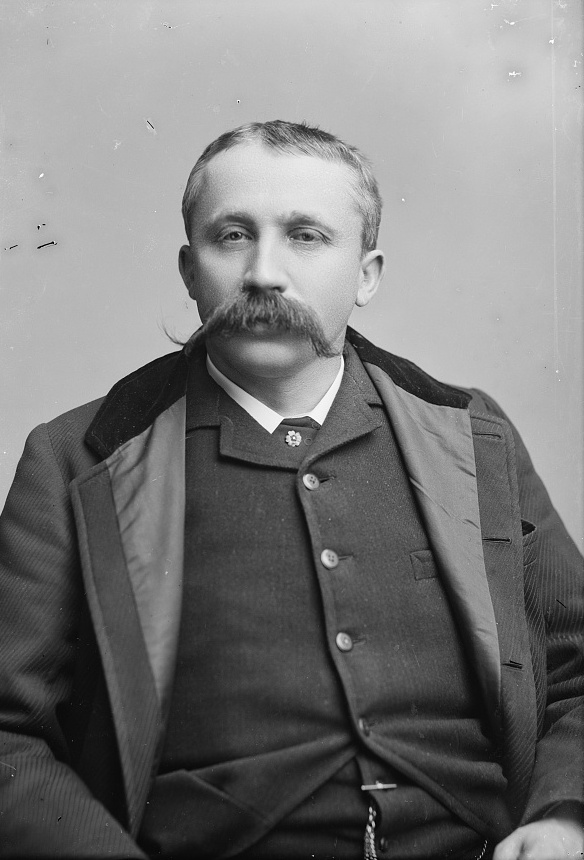
- Portrait by C. M. Bell c. 1883–1887

Member of the U.S. House of Representatives from Virginia's 2nd district
- In office March 4, 1883 – March 3, 1887
- Preceded by: John F. Dezendorf
- Succeeded by: George E. Bowden

Personal details
- Born: November 22, 1843 Wakefield, New Hampshire
- Died: September 30, 1913 (aged 69) Hampton, Virginia
- Party: Readjuster (until 1885)
- Other political affiliations: Republican (after 1885)
- Profession: businessman

Harrison 'Harry' Libbey (November 22, 1843 – September 30, 1913) was a U.S. representative from Virginia's 2nd congressional district.

== Biography ==
Born in Wakefield, New Hampshire, Libbey attended the common schools. He moved to Virginia and settled in Hampton in 1863. He engaged in mercantile pursuits. He was appointed one of the presiding justices of Elizabeth City County, Virginia, in 1869.

Libbey was elected as a Readjuster to the Forty-eighth Congress and reelected as a Republican to the Forty-ninth Congress (March 4, 1883 – March 3, 1887). He engaged in the oyster industry. He served as chairman of the Republican county committee. He was appointed postmaster of Hampton, Virginia, January 18, 1907, and served until his death in Hampton, Virginia, on September 30, 1913. He was interred in St. John's Cemetery.

== Electoral history ==
- 1882; Libbey was elected to the U.S. House of Representatives defeating Republican John Frederick Dezendorf and Democrat Richard C. Marshall, winning 49.68% of the vote.
- 1884; Libbey was re-elected defeating Democrat Marshall, winning 58.3% of the vote.

== Sources ==
- United States Congress. "Harry Libbey (id: L000298)". Biographical Directory of the United States Congress.

U.S. House of Representatives
Preceded by John F. Dezendorf	Member of the U.S. House of Representatives from Virginia's 2nd congressional district 1883–1887	Succeeded by George E. Bowden
