= Norvell L. Henley =

American politician

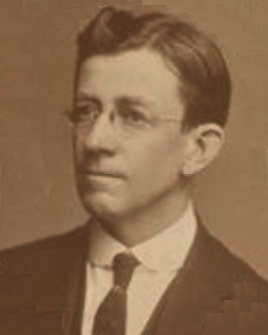
- Portrait of Henley, 1916

Member of the Virginia House of Delegates for New Kent, Charles City, James City, York, Warwick, and Williamsburg
- In office January 12, 1916 – March 13, 1923
- Preceded by: Roger T. Gregory
- Succeeded by: Ashton Dovell

Personal details
- Born: Norvell Lightfoot Henley; May 10, 1869 James City, Virginia, U.S.
- Died: March 13, 1923 (aged 53) Richmond, Virginia, U.S.
- Party: Democratic
- Spouse: Edmonia Pendleton Turner
- Education: College of William & Mary; University of Virginia

Norvell Lightfoot Henley (May 10, 1869 – March 13, 1923) was an American attorney and politician who served in the Virginia House of Delegates from 1916 until his death in office in 1923.
