= Samuel F. Phillips =

American politician

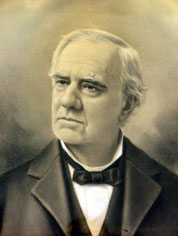

2nd Solicitor General of the United States
- In office December 11, 1872 – May 1, 1885
- Appointed by: Ulysses Grant
- Preceded by: Benjamin H. Bristow
- Succeeded by: John Goode

1st Auditor of Public Accounts of North Carolina
- In office January 1, 1863 – July 10, 1864
- Succeeded by: Richard H. Battle

Personal details
- Born: Samuel Field Phillips; February 18, 1824 New York, New York, U.S.
- Died: November 18, 1903 (aged 79) Washington, D.C., U.S.
- Resting place: Chapel Hill, North Carolina
- Spouse(s): Frances R. Lucas; Sarah Maury
- Education: University of North Carolina at Chapel Hill

Samuel Field Phillips (February 18, 1824 – November 18, 1903) was a civil rights pioneer, lawyer, politician who served as the second solicitor general of the United States (from 1872 to 1885). He then took part in the landmark civil rights case Plessy v. Ferguson.

== Early life ==
Samuel F. Phillips was born in New York. His father, James Phillips, was a British mathematician. When Samuel was about two years of age his father became the first professor of mathematics at the newly formed University of North Carolina at Chapel Hill (UNC) and the family moved to Chapel Hill, North Carolina.

== Education ==
Samuel Phillips graduated from UNC with highest honors in 1841, earning a master's degree three years later. He began his own law practice in North Carolina and joined the UNC law department as a tutor.

== Political career ==
Phillips embarked on a career in politics beginning with his election as a Whig to the North Carolina General Assemblies of 1852 and 1854. Phillips served on North Carolina's state North Carolina Court of Claims in 1861, and as state auditor from 1862 to 1864.

Phillips was an opponent of secession and during the U.S. Civil War he became a member of the "Peace Party" of newspaper publisher William Woods Holden (1818–1892), whose 1863 "peace meetings" across North Carolina urged the state to stop fighting the Civil War.

In 1864, Phillips was re-elected to the General Assembly, serving as Speaker of the House in 1866. He was a member of the first "Reconstruction Convention," and joined the Republican Party, which earned him much condemnation as a "scalawag." He fought for the expansion of legal rights for African Americans, triumphing in granting freedmen the right to testify in cases in which they were parties.

In 1866 Phillips left politics to return to the private practice of law. In the Fall of 1867 he moved his family to Raleigh, North Carolina, where he became North Carolina's Supreme Court Reporter. He returned to politics in 1870.

In 1871, Phillips served another term in the North Carolina House of Representatives. In 1872, Phillips was appointed the second U.S. solicitor general by President Ulysses S. Grant, serving in this position from November 1872 to May 1885. During Phillips's twelve and one-half years as solicitor general, he served under four presidents: Grant, Hayes, Garfield, and Arthur. Phillips argued the constitutionality of the 1871 Enforcement Act and advocated upholding a conviction of several Ku Klux Klan members who assaulted a black man for voting in a congressional election. Citing Article I of the U.S. Constitution, he set a precedent used in the 1960s to validate the expansion of federal control over the election process. He also argued Reynolds v. United States, 98 U.S. 145 (1879).

Phillips was part of the team who argued the Civil Rights Cases of 1883, using both the Civil Rights Act of 1875 and the 13th and 14th Amendments as a defense. As part of the legal counsel representing Homer Plessy in the landmark Plessy v. Ferguson case, he argued that the "separate-but-equal" doctrine was nothing less than a disparagement of African Americans on the basis of color, much like slavery.

After serving as solicitor general, he went on to become a member of the U.S. and Venezuela Mixed Claims Commissions of 1888 and 1891. Phillips returned to private law practice in Washington, D.C., until 1901.

== Personal life ==
Phillips married Frances R. Lucas (1831–1883), on December 3, 1849, at Chapel Hill. They had 10 children. In 1889 Phillips married Sarah Maury; she died in 1902. They had no children.

Samuel Phillips died on November 18, 1903, aged 79, in Washington, D.C. His body was later moved to Chapel Hill, North Carolina.

Cornelia Phillips Spencer (1825–1908), a North Carolina educational activist and author, is his sister.

Party political offices
Preceded by William M. Coleman	Republican nominee for Attorney General of North Carolina; 1870	Succeeded by Tazewell L. Hargrove
Political offices
New office	Auditor of Public Accounts of North Carolina; 1863–1864	Succeeded by Richard H. Battle
Legal offices
Preceded by Benjamin H. Bristow	Solicitor General of the United States; 1872–1885	Succeeded by John Goode
