= Ivy Hill Cemetery (Smithfield, Virginia) =

Historic cemetery in Virginia, United States

- U.S. National Register of Historic Places
- U.S. Historic district
- Virginia Landmarks Register
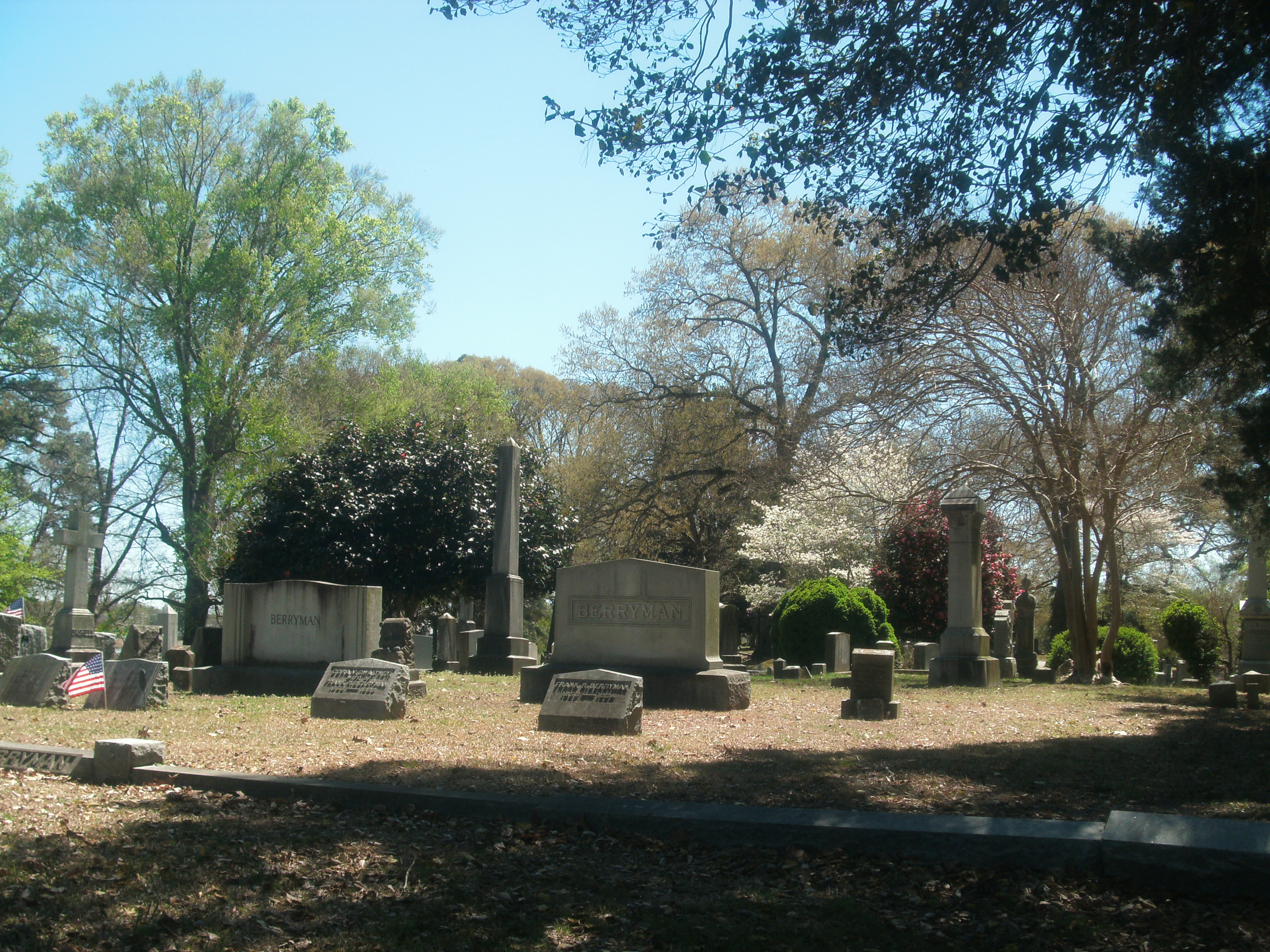
- Graves at the cemetery, April 2017

- Location within Virginia Location within the United States
- Location: W of N. Church St., Smithfield, Virginia
- Coordinates: 36°59′23″N 76°37′56″W
- Area: 14 acres (5.7 ha)
- Built: 1886
- Architectural style: Mid 19th Century Revival, Late Victorian
- NRHP reference No.: 07000275
- VLR No.: 300-5005

Significant dates
- Added to NRHP: April 4, 2007
- Designated VLR: September 6, 2006

Ivy Hill Cemetery is a historic rural cemetery and national historic district located at Smithfield, Isle of Wight County, Virginia. It was established in 1886, and is a privately owned cemetery. Grave markers within the cemetery date from the mid-19th century to the present day. It includes a number of notable funerary monuments.

Notable burials include:

- Pembroke Decatur Gwaltney (1836–1915), founder of the highly successful Gwaltney ham and peanut business
- Congressman Joel Holleman (1799–1844)
- Congressman Dr. John W. Lawson (1837–1905)
- Hardy Cross (1885–1959), Pioneer in the field of Structural Engineering

It was listed on the National Register of Historic Places in 2007.
