= Roger T. Gregory =

American politician (1866–1937)

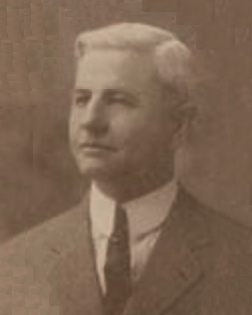
- Portrait of Gregory, 1914

Member of the Virginia House of Delegates for New Kent, Charles City, James City, York, Warwick, and Williamsburg
- In office January 14, 1914 – January 12, 1916
- Preceded by: Hack U. Stephenson
- Succeeded by: Norvell L. Henley
- In office January 10, 1906 – January 8, 1908
- Preceded by: Andrew J. Barnes
- Succeeded by: William E. Goffigan

Personal details
- Born: Roger Taylor Gregory; May 31, 1866; Hanover, Virginia, U.S.
- Died: July 8, 1937 (aged 71); New Kent, Virginia, U.S.
- Resting place: Hollywood Cemetery
- Political party: Democratic
- Spouse: Evelina Gregory (m. 1918)
- Education: Richmond College (LLB)
- Occupation: Lawyer; politician

Roger Taylor Gregory (May 31, 1866 – July 8, 1937) was an American attorney and politician who served in the Virginia House of Delegates from 1906 to 1908 and again from 1914 to 1916.

== Early and family life ==
Born shortly after the Civil War to the former Sally Barton Winston and her husband, Dr. Junius Claiborne Gregory. He was born in Hanover County, where his mother's family had lived. However, his paternal ancestors were related to the Claiborne family, one of the First Families of Virginia in King William County. His ancestors operated the Elsing Green plantation using enslaved labor. His father had been educated at the Medical College of Virginia, then at Jefferson Medical College in Philadelphia before volunteering to fight for the Confederate States of America with the 9th Virginia Cavalry. Before his marriage and the birth of his first child (this boy), Dr. Gregory served the Confederate States Army as a military surgeon, and was twice captured by Union troops and ultimately received a pardon after the conflict. His father and uncles changed the family tradition by choosing to be buried at historic Hollywood Cemetery in Richmond.

In 1870, his father moved his growing family to nearby New Kent County where he practiced there the rest of his life. His birth family also included several younger sisters and a much younger brother. This boy was educated in New Kent County before moving to Richmond, where he graduated from the University of Richmond in 1892.

== Career ==
After being admitted to the Virginia state bar, Gregory had a private legal practice and also became involved in Democratic Party politics. Before his uncle's death, voters twice elected this man to the Virginia House of Delegates.

Gregory served as the Commonwealth Attorney (prosecutor) of New Kent County (1924-1928) and as attorney for the Southern Railway Company.

== Death and legacy ==
Gregory died at his home, Marengo, and is buried at Hollywood cemetery in Richmond.
