= John F. Dezendorf =

American politician

John Frederick Dezendorf
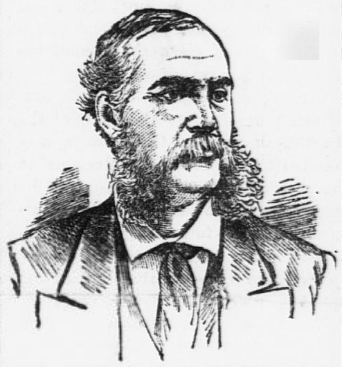

Member of the U.S. House of Representatives from Virginia's 2nd district
- In office March 4, 1881 – March 3, 1883
- Preceded by: John Goode Jr.
- Succeeded by: Harry Libbey

Personal details
- Born: August 10, 1834 Lansingburgh, New York
- Died: June 22, 1894 (aged 59) Norfolk, Virginia
- Party: Republican
- Profession: civil engineer, civil servant, businessman in construction industry

John Frederick Dezendorf (August 10, 1834 – June 22, 1894) was a U.S. representative from Virginia.

== Biography ==
Born in Lansingburgh, New York, Dezendorf pursued an academic course. Learned the carpenter's trade. He studied architecture and civil engineering. He engaged in railroad and other building at Toledo and Cleveland, Ohio from 1850 to 1860, and later, from 1860 to 1862, in mercantile pursuits. He moved to Norfolk, Virginia, in 1863 and engaged in the shipping business until 1866. Surveyor of Norfolk City and County 1866–1869. He served as assistant assessor of the United States internal revenue from September 9, 1870, to August 6, 1872. Appraiser of merchandise at the Norfolk customhouse from August 7, 1872, until the position was abolished in 1877. He served as delegate to the Republican National Convention in 1876. He was an unsuccessful Republican candidate for election in 1878 to the Forty-sixth Congress.

Dezendorf was elected as a Republican to the Forty-seventh Congress (March 4, 1881 – March 3, 1883). He engaged in the construction business. He died in Norfolk, Virginia, June 22, 1894. He was interred in Elmwood Cemetery.

== Elections ==
- 1878; Dezendorf lost his first bid for election to the U.S. House of Representatives to Democrat John Goode Jr.
- 1880; Dezendorf won election to the U.S. House of Representatives defeating Democrat Goode and Readjuster Benjamin W. Lacy, winning 52.6% of the vote.

U.S. House of Representatives
Preceded by John Goode Jr.	Member of the U.S. House of Representatives from Virginia's 2nd congressional district 1881–1883	Succeeded by Harry Libbey
