= G. William Whitehurst =

American politician (1925–2026)

Bill Whitehurst
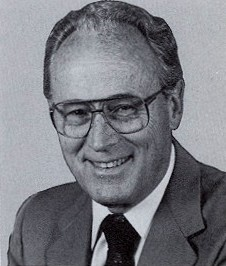
- Whitehurst in 1985

Member of the U.S. House of Representatives from Virginia's 2nd district
- In office January 3, 1969 – January 3, 1987
- Preceded by: Porter Hardy Jr.
- Succeeded by: Owen B. Pickett

Personal details
- Born: George William Whitehurst; March 12, 1925 Norfolk, Virginia, U.S.
- Died: November 7, 2026 (aged 101) Norfolk, Virginia, U.S.
- Party: Republican
- Spouse: Jennette Seymour Franks (m. 1946; died 2009)
- Children: 2
- Education: Washington and Lee University (BA); University of Virginia (MA); West Virginia University (PhD)

George William Whitehurst (March 12, 1925 – November 7, 2026) was an American politician, journalist and academic who served as a member of the United States House of Representatives for nine terms representing Virginia's 2nd congressional district from 1969 to 1987. He began his career as a professor at the Norfolk campus of the College of William & Mary, which became Old Dominion University in 1962 and he served as dean of students from 1963 to 1968. Upon retiring from politics, he returned to what was by then Old Dominion University, where he held the chair of Kaufman Lecturer in Public Affairs until he retired.

== Early life ==
George William Whitehurst was born in Norfolk, Virginia, on March 12, 1925, to Calvert Stanhope Whitehurst and the former Laura Virginia Tomlinson. Graduating from Matthew Fontaine Maury High School in 1942, he served in the United States Navy as an aviation radioman in the Pacific Theater, from 1943 to 1946. He married Jennette Seymour Franks on August 24, 1946 in Plymouth, Massachusetts. Together, they had one daughter and one son. His wife died on March 6, 2009.

Whitehurst received his bachelor's degree in history from Washington and Lee University in 1950, and his master's degree, also in history, from the University of Virginia in 1951. In 1962, Whitehurst received his Doctor of Philosophy in American Diplomatic History from West Virginia University. While attending Washington and Lee University, he joined the Delta Upsilon fraternity. He later served on the board of directors for Delta Upsilon fraternity. He was an active faculty member at the Norfolk Division of William & Mary in 1950, and was on hand when the Division became an autonomous four-year institution, Old Dominion University, in 1962. He stepped down in 1968 to run for Congress.

== Congressional career ==
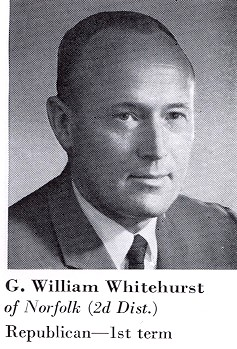
Whitehurst as a freshman member of Congress in the Congressional Pictorial Directory in 1969.

Whitehurst was elected to the U.S. Congress in 1968 as a Republican from a district based in the Hampton Roads area. He was the first Republican to represent that part of Virginia since the Great Depression, and only the second Republican elected to a full term from that district in the 20th century. In 1971, Whitehurst voted in favor of the Equal Employment Opportunity Act of 1972. Whitehurst considered himself a "moderate conservative", voting in favor of the Equal Rights Amendment and a 1970 Voting Rights Act extension while being opposed to abortion.

He was re-elected eight more times without serious difficulty. In 1974, for instance, even as Republicans were swept out in the face of voter anger over Watergate, Whitehurst still won comfortably with almost 60 percent of the vote. The Democrats didn't even put up a candidate from 1978 to 1984, and on three of those occasions Whitehurst was completely unopposed. In 1986, Whitehurst stated his support of naturalization of Filipinos who were serving in the United States Navy. He retired in 1987 after declining to run for a tenth term.

For most of his tenure in Congress, he served on the United States House Committee on Armed Services. He also served on the United States House Permanent Select Committee on Intelligence and the United States House Committee on Ethics.

== Later life and death ==
After his service in the United States Congress, Whitehurst returned as a faculty member at Old Dominion University in 1987, and retired in May 2020.

Whitehurst also served for many years as an analyst for WTKR in Norfolk.

On October 6, 2016, Whitehurst, along with other former Republican members of the United States Congress, was a co-signator of a letter opposing Donald Trump's candidacy for the office of president. Although the letter did not officially endorse Hillary Clinton or any other candidate, it did state that "our party's nominee this year is a man who makes a mockery of the principles and values we have cherished and which we sought to represent in Congress."

On August 24, 2020, Whitehurst was one of 24 former Republican lawmakers to endorse Democratic nominee Joe Biden on the opening day of the Democratic National Convention.

Upon the death of Frank J. Guarini in June 2026, he became the oldest living former U.S. representative. Whitehurst died in Norfolk, Virginia, on November 7, 2026, at the age of 101.

== Electoral history ==
- 1968; Whitehurst defeated Democrat Frederick T. Stant winning 54.21% of the vote.
- 1970; Whitehurst defeated Democrat Joseph T. Fitzpatrick winning 61.71% of the vote.
- 1972; Whitehurst defeated Democrat L. Charles Burlage winning 73.45% of the vote.
- 1974; Whitehurst defeated Democrat Robert R. Richards winning 59.99% of the vote.
- 1976; Whitehurst defeated Democrat Robert Everett Washington winning 65.69% of the vote.
- 1978; Whitehurst was unopposed for re-election.
- 1980; Whitehurst defeated Independent Kenneth Morrison winning 89.84% of the vote.
- 1982; Whitehurst was unopposed for re-election.
- 1984; Whitehurst was unopposed for re-election.

== Later electoral history ==
Virginia's 2nd congressional district election, 1980
Party	Candidate	Votes	%
Republican	G. William Whitehurst (Incumbent)	97,319	89.84%
Independent	Kenneth P. Morrison	11,003	10.16%
Write-in		6	0.01%
Total votes		108,328	100%
Republican hold			

Virginia's 2nd congressional district election, 1982
Party	Candidate	Votes	%
Republican	G. William Whitehurst (Incumbent)	78,108	99.88%
Write-in		97	0.12%
Total votes		78,205	100%
Republican hold			

Virginia's 2nd congressional district election, 1984
Party	Candidate	Votes	%
Republican	G. William Whitehurst (Incumbent)	136,632	99.81%
Write-in		256	0.19%
Total votes		136,888	100%
Republican hold			

U.S. House of Representatives
Preceded by Porter Hardy Jr.	Member of the U.S. House of Representatives from Virginia's 2nd congressional district 1969–1987	Succeeded by Owen B. Pickett
Honorary titles
Preceded by Frank J. Guarini	Oldest living United States Representative; Sitting or Former; 2026	Succeeded by Roscoe Bartlett
