= William E. Goffigan =

American politician (1841–1909)

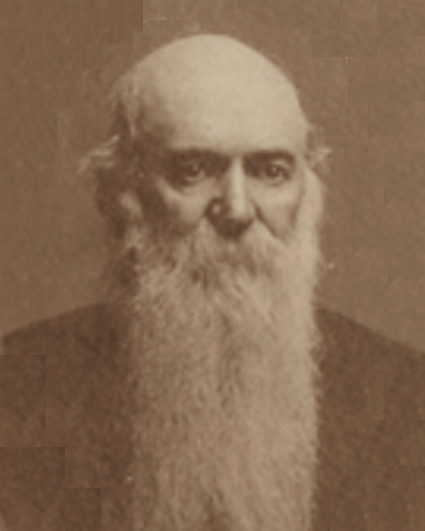
- Portrait of Goffigan, 1908

Member of the Virginia House of Delegates for New Kent, Charles City, James City, York, Warwick, and Williamsburg
- In office January 8, 1908 – August 9, 1909
- Preceded by: Roger T. Gregory
- Succeeded by: Hack U. Stephenson

Personal details
- Born: William Edward Goffigan; March 2, 1841
- Died: August 9, 1909 (aged 68); Hampton, Virginia, U.S.
- Political party: Democratic
- Spouse: Annie Elizabeth Cooke (m. 1871; died 1905)
- Occupation: Merchant; politician

Military service
- Allegiance: Confederate States
- Branch/service: Confederate States Army
- Rank: Captain
- Battles/wars: American Civil War

William Edward Goffigan (March 10, 1841 – August 9, 1909) was an American politician who served in the Virginia House of Delegates. First elected in 1907, he died shortly after winning renomination to his seat.
