= Hack U. Stephenson =

American politician (1872–1949)

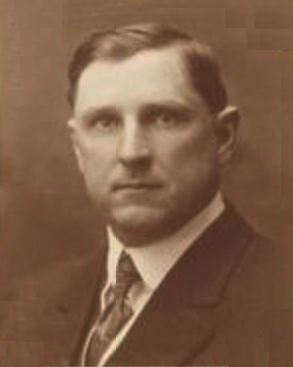
- Official portrait, 1912

Member of the Virginia House of Delegates for New Kent, Charles City, James City, York, Warwick, and Williamsburg
- In office January 12, 1910 – January 14, 1914
- Preceded by: William E. Goffigan
- Succeeded by: Roger T. Gregory

Personal details
- Born: Hack Urquhart Stephenson; November 5, 1872 Southampton, Virginia, U.S.
- Died: January 20, 1949 (aged 76) Richmond, Virginia, U.S.
- Resting place: Forest Lawn Cemetery
- Party: Democratic
- Spouse: Cynthia Gertrude Early (m. 1903)
- Children: 4
- Education: Richmond College; Medical College of Virginia
- Occupation: Physician; politician

Hack Urquhart Stephenson (November 5, 1872 – January 20, 1949) was an American physician and politician. He served in the Virginia House of Delegates from 1910 to 1914.

== Early life ==
Stephenson was born in Southampton County, Virginia on November 5, 1872. His parents were Elizabeth Holden and Levi W. Stephenson. He attended public school in Southampton County before attending the Corinth Academy.

Stephens graduated from the Richmond College. He then enrolled in the Medical College of Virginia, graduating in 1895.

== Career ==
=== Medicine ===
Stephenson practiced medicine in Toano, Virginia from 1895 to 1922. He then moved to Richmond, Virginia where he was the medical advisor for the Industrial Commission of Virginia. He also worked for the Chesapeake and Ohio Railway as a surgeon for 25 years.

Stephenson was chairman of the board of Eastern State Hospital from 1908 to 1922. During World War II, he was a member of the local board of examiners; he was also the food administrator for James City County. Governor Claude A. Swanson appointed Stephenson to the State Board of Medical Examiners for the third district on March 21, 1906. He was a member of the State Board of Medical of Examiners for Richmond from 1918 until he died in 1949.

Stephenson was a member of the American Medical Association, the Medical Society of Virginia, and the Richmond Academy of Medicine. He was the president of the Medical College of Virginia alumni association.

=== Politics ===
Stephenson was the chairman of the James City County Democratic Party from 1900 to 1907. He was chairman of the James City County Board of Supervisors from 1904 to 1908. He was elected to the Virginia House of Delegates in 1909, as a Democrat representing Charles City County, James City County, New Kent County, Warwick County, Williamsburg, and York, County from 1910 to 1914.

== Nat Turner's remains ==
In October 1897, Virginia newspapers reported that Stephenson possessed the skeleton of Nat Turner, which was being used as a medical specimen in his office in Toano, Virginia. The report stated that the skeleton had been obtained from Dr. S. B. Kellar, who claimed to have acquired Turner's body after his execution and prepared the bones as a specimen. Turner's body had previously been subjected to post-mortem dissection and exploitation: contemporary and later accounts state that his skin was used to make souvenir purses, his flesh was rendered into grease, and his bones were retained as specimens and trophies.

== Personal life ==
Stephenson married Cynthia Gertrude Early on February 25, 1903. She was the daughter of Elizabeth Johnston and James N. Early of Hillsville, Virginia. They had four children: Cynthia Ellis Stephenson, Emily Kent Stephenson, Holden Early Stephenson, and Hack Urquhart Stephenson Jr. They lived on 2918 Kensington Avenue in Richmond at the time of his death.

Stephenson died in the hospital in Richmond on January 20, 1949. He was buried in Forest Lawn Cemetery in Richmond.
