= Benjamin Blunt (patriot) =

American politician (1734 – 1799)

Member of the Virginia House of Delegates representing Southampton County
- In office October 18, 1790 – October 16, 1791
- Preceded by: Edwin Gray Sr.
- Succeeded by: Edwin Gray

Personal details
- Born: 1734 Southampton County, Virginia Virginia Colony, British America
- Died: 1799 (aged 64–65)
- Profession: Planter, military officer, politician

Military service
- Branch/service: Virginia militia
- Rank: Colonel

Benjamin Blunt (1734 – 1799) was a planter, patriot and politician from Southampton County who represented the county for one term in the Virginia House of Delegates after also representing it at the Virginia Ratifying Convention.

== Early life ==
His parents Benjamin Blunt (1705-1751) and Priscilla Sugars lived in Isle of Wight County before it was split to form Surry County. The Blounts were prominent merchants in North Carolina.

== Career ==
Blunt served as Major of the County militia under James Ridley, and William Blunt served as captain of one of the county's seven militia companies. After the war the General Assembly in 1790 authorized him, Samuel Kello and Francis Boykin, among others, to conduct a lottery to raise funds to erect a school in Southampton County. Millfield Academy was accordingly established on the road between the county seats of Southampton and Isle of Wight Counties (then Jerusalem and Smithfield, respectively).

Blunt was primarily a planter, and in the 1787 Virginia Tax census, Col. Benjamin Blunt owned 14 enslaved adults, and 20 slaves under 16 years old, as well as 10 horses, 49 cattle and a 2-wheeled carriage, while another man of the same name, as well as Henry Blunt worked for this man's younger brother John Blunt, who was taxed on 18 adult slaves, 29 enslaved children 12 horses and 45 cattle. Southampton County voters elected Blunt and Samuel Kello as their delegates to the Virginia Ratifying Convention in 1788, and both men voted for ratification. Two years later, Benjamin Blunt was elected to replace Edwin Gray (either the multi-term legislator or his son, who would later become a congressman), but was not re-elected.

His son or nephew (John's son), also Benjamin Blunt (1762-1827) was a noted horse breeder in Southampton County. That Benjamin Blunt may have married Ann Edwards in 1790, and was first elected as a delegate in 1810 and the following year married Margaret Kello. The younger Benjamin Blunt (possibly with another relative of the same name) owned 13 or 55 slaves in the 1810 census. In 1826 one of those man freed his elderly slave Anthony, who requested the legislature to take pity on his advanced age (over 60 years old) and allow him to remain in the county, but which petition was denied. That Blunt died by 1827 but his estate was not yet settled nearly five years later. Two of his former slaves (Ben and Luke) were asked to join Nat Turner's rebellion (which visited the plantation of his relative Dr. Simon Blunt) but only Ben did so and was among the last hanged, on December 20, 1831.
