= John Goode (Virginia politician) =

American politician (1829–1909)

John Goode Jr.
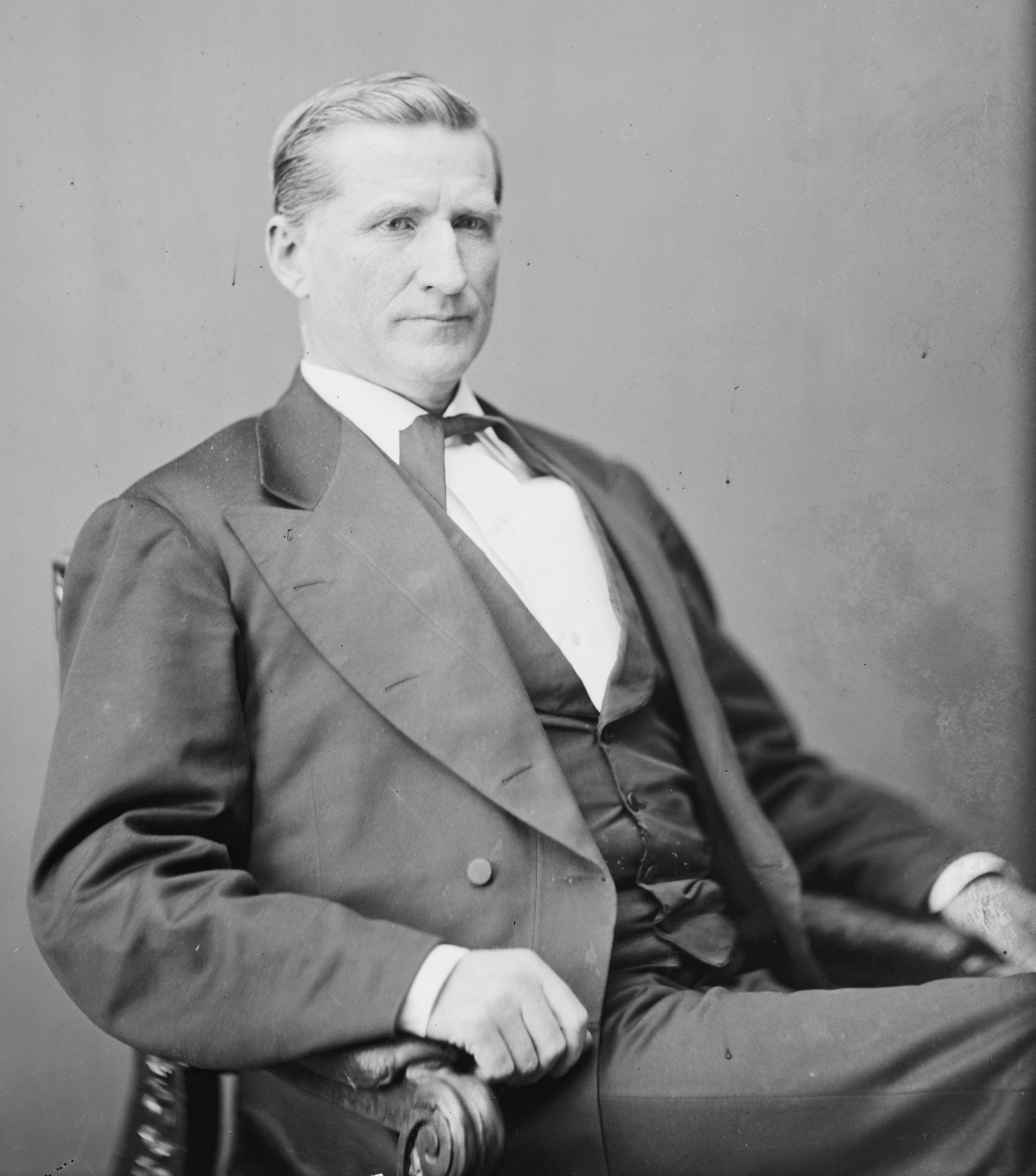
- John Goode Jr. between 1865 and 1880

3rd Solicitor General of the United States
- In office May 1885 – August 1886
- Appointed by: Grover Cleveland
- Preceded by: Samuel F. Phillips
- Succeeded by: George A. Jenks

Member of the U.S. House of Representatives from Virginia's 2nd district
- In office March 4, 1875 – March 3, 1881
- Preceded by: James H. Platt Jr.
- Succeeded by: John F. Dezendorf

Chairman of the Committee on Education and Labor
- In office March 4, 1877 – March 3, 1881
- Preceded by: Gilbert C. Walker
- Succeeded by: Jonathan T. Updegraff

Member of the Virginia House of Delegates from Norfolk County
- In office 1867 Serving with A. F. Leonard
- Preceded by: W.H.C. Ellis
- Succeeded by: Henry S. Bowden

Member of the Confederate States House of Representatives from Virginia's 6th district
- In office February 22, 1862 – March 18, 1865
- Preceded by: Position established
- Succeeded by: Position abolished

Member of the Virginia House of Delegates from Bedford County
- In office 1852–1853 Serving with Samuel G. Davis
- Preceded by: William M. Burwell
- Succeeded by: Jesse S. Burks

Personal details
- Born: May 27, 1829 Bedford, Virginia, US
- Died: July 14, 1909 (aged 80) Norfolk, Virginia, US
- Resting place: Longwood Cemetery; Bedford, Virginia
- Party: Democratic
- Education: Emory and Henry College; Lexington Law School
- Occupation: Politician, lawyer

Military service
- Allegiance: Confederate States of America
- Branch/service: Confederate Army
- Rank: Colonel
- Unit: Jubal Early's Staff
- Battles/wars: American Civil War First Battle of Manassas

John Goode Jr. (May 27, 1829 – July 14, 1909) was a Virginia attorney and Democratic politician. He served in both the United States Congress and the Confederate Congress, and was a colonel in the Confederate Army. He was Solicitor General of the United States during the presidency of Grover Cleveland. He was known as "the grand old man of Virginia".

== Early life ==
Goode was born in Liberty (now Bedford), the county seat of Bedford County, Virginia. He was first son of Ann (née Leftwich) and John Goode (1796-1876), a veteran of the War of 1812, who lived on a plantation and enslaved 39 individuals. His paternal grandfather, Edmund Goode, fought in the American Revolutionary War, then moved from Caroline County westward to the Peaks of Otter area of what became Bedford County. His maternal great-grandfather, Joel Leftwich, fought in the American Revolutionary War and the War of 1812.

Goode was educated at the New Fields School, the New London Academy and Emory and Henry College, graduating in 1848. He studied law at the Lexington Law School (now Washington and Lee University School of Law) and was admitted to the Virginia bar in April 1851.

== Early career ==
In May 1851, Goode began practicing law in Liberty (now Bedford), Virginia. He served one term in the Virginia House of Delegates as a Democrat in 1852, which was unusual because Bedford County was primarily a Whigs country. In 1861, Bedford County voters elected Goode to the Virginia Secession Convention which passed the Ordinance of Secession in April 1861.

== Confederacy and Civil War ==
Goode joined Company A of the 2nd Virginia Cavalry (Confederate Army) as a private on May 11, 1861, under the command of Capt. William R. Terry. Goode took leave June 12–July 11, 1861, to participate in the Secession Convention as it established an alternate government for Virginia. Cavalryman Goode fought at the First Battle of Manassas on July 21, 1861. In October 1861, he was promoted to Captain, serving as the Aid-de-Camp for Major General Jubal A. Early from October 5, 1861, through December 1862, and again in 1864. He resigned his commission on December 4, 1862, to attend to his duties as a member of the Confederate Congress.

Goode was elected to the First Confederate Congress and the Second Confederate Congress, serving from February 22, 1862, until the war's end. Three of his brothers–Willian O. Goode, Granville Breckenridge Goode, and Edmund Goode–died during the Civil War.

== Postwar and Virginia politics ==
After the war, Goode resumed his law practice but moved to Norfolk, Virginia. Like many high-ranking ex-Confederates. He was an active Democrat and part of what became known as the Staples Organization (a predecessor of the Byrd Organization). He was a presidential elector in 1852, 1856, and 1884, and attended the Democratic National Conventions of 1868 and 1872.

When Delegate W. H. C. Ellis resigned in early 1866, Goode was appointed to represent the city of Norfolk in the Virginia House of Delegates for the December 1866 and March–April 1867 sessions. The Southern Opinion wrote on November 16, 1866, "Mr. Goode is a lawyer of methodical mind, that is in its astuteness reminds us of Edmund Burke. He is emphatically an easy speaker, but the most effective of orators, by the very force and correctness of his opinion. Physically considered he is an ideal legislator, and though the least presumptuous, is the most prominent member of the Virginia House of Delegates." However, Norfolk voters replaced Goode in 1869.

Goode moved his legal practice to Washington, D.C., after his election to Congress. He became a member of the boards of visitors of the University of Virginia, the College of William & Mary, and the Virginia Agriculture and Mechanical College (now Virginia Tech). He was President of the Virginia Bar Association in 1898.

== Congress ==
Goode served three consecutive terms in Congress representing Virginia's 2nd congressional district. He was a Democrat throughout his tenure.

In 1874, he defeated three-term Republican incumbent James H. Platt Jr. and the Independent Republican Robert Nortow by winning 49.43% of the vote to represent Virginia's 2nd congressional district in the 44th United States Congress. In 1876, he was re-elected to serve in the 45th United States Congress, defeating Republican Joseph Segar by winning 52.97% of the vote. In 1878, he was re-elected to serve in the 46th United States Congress, defeating Republican John Frederick Dezendorf by winning 56.73% of the vote.

During his second and third congressional terms, he was chairman of the Committee on Education and Labor.

In November 1880, Goode lost his re-election bid to John Frederick Dezendorf. His term ended on March 3, 1881.

== Solicitor General ==
In May 1885, President Grover Cleveland, a fellow Democrat, appointed Goode as the acting Solicitor General of the United States. Goode served in this capacity until August 1886. He retained the status of acting because he failed confirmation by the Senate due to differences between him and Virginia Senator William Mahone. During that time, Goode visited British Columbia to represent the United States in an extradition case.

In 1892, Cleveland appointed Goode to the United States and Chilean Claims Commission which settled several disputes between the two countries.

== 1902 Virginia Constitutional Convention ==
Although he had lived in Norfolk and Washington, D.C., Goode continued to own property in Bedford County, Virginia, where his family lived. Bedford County voters elected Goode to represent them at the Virginia Constitutional Convention of 1901 and 1902. Fellow delegates unanimously elected Goode as the convention's president. In his acceptance speech. Goode denounced both the Reconstruction Amendments and the Virginia Constitutional Convention of 1868, saying, "Congress not only committed a stupendous blunder, but a crime against civilization and Christianity when, against the advice of their wisest leaders, they required the people of Virginia and the South, under the rule of the bayonet, to submit to universal negro suffrage."

The convention ultimately stripped the 1868 state constitution's clauses which denounced Virginia's rebellion against the United States and outlawed slavery. The convention also forbade the education of white and black children in the same school. Disenfranchisement became the subject of much debate; delegate Carter Glass explained how it would inevitably cut 4/5ths of the African American voters. Large sections of the final document restricted voting to war veterans and their sons, property owners who paid at least $1,000 in taxes during the previous year, and any man who could give a satisfactory explanation of any portion of the state constitution. It also allowed the legislature to establish further voting restrictions.

Despite pre-convention promises that voters would have a choice of ratifying the final document, the delegates voted to proclaim it as in effect as of July 10, 1902 and never submitted it to voters. Lawyer and Readjuster John S. Wise pursued two federal cases contested that the lack of submission, as well as delegates' intent to disenfranchise African-American voters. However, federal judges relied on an 1895 case arising out of the South Carolina convention to find a lack of jurisdiction. When that decision was appealed, the U.S. Supreme Court declined to get involved. Supreme Court Justice David J. Brewer elaborated, citing that in the William Jones case, the U.S. House of Representatives seated his opponent despite complaints, noting "the thing sought to be prohibited has been done and cannot be undone by order of the court." As of the 1904 election, fifty percent fewer white and ninety percent fewer black men voted in Virginia.

== Yorktown Centennial and Jamestown Ter-Centennial ==
Goode served as president of the Yorktown Centennial Commission. As a member of Congress, he authored a bill for a monument at Yorktown that celebrated the surrender of Cornwallis during the Revolutionary War. In 1876, he spoke at the unveiling of the monument at Yorktown; his oration there will "probably remain as his masterpiece of forensic eloquence."

He introduced a bill to celebrate on May 13, 1907, as well as for funding and national recognition of the Ter-Centennial of the founding of Jamestown. His oration to Congress on this matter is transcribed in his book, Recollections of a Lifetime.

== Personal ==
On July 10, 1855, Goode married Sarah Sally Urquhart (1832-1890), daughter of a wealthy planter, Dr. Richard Alexander Urquhart of Strawberry Plains plantation in Isle of Wight County, Virginia. Their children were Mary Urquhart Goode (1856-1926), Richard Urquhart Goode (1858-1903), John Breckinridge Goode (1864-1917), Annie Walton Goode (1869-1871), and James Urquhart Goode (1873-1944). According to the 1860 census, the Goode family enslaved seven individuals.

Goode was the primary speaker at the 1875 dedication of a monument for Confederate war dead at Piedmont Hill in Bedford; the monument was eventually moved to Longwood Cemetery in Bedford. He published his memoir, Recollections of a Lifetime, in 1906.

Goode was described as, "A man of splendid stature, large head crowned with snowy hair, ruddy complexion and eyes that sparkled with fun and twinkled with the kindly humor he invariably injected into his always bright and interesting conversation."

In 1909, Goode had a stroke which resulted in paralysis. He died several weeks later on July 14, 1909, at the age of 80 at St. Vincent's Hospital in Norfolk. He was buried in Longwood Cemetery in Bedford, Virginia. Goode, a community in Bedford County, Virginia, is named in his honor.

Legal offices
Preceded by Samuel F. Phillips	Solicitor General of the United States; 1885–1886	Succeeded by George A. Jenks
U.S. House of Representatives
Preceded by James H. Platt Jr.	Member of the U.S. House of Representatives from Virginia's 2nd congressional district 1875–1881	Succeeded by John F. Dezendorf
Political offices
Preceded by Gilbert C. Walker; Virginia	Chairman of House Education and Labor Committee; 1887–1881	Succeeded by Jonathan T. Updegraff; Ohio
