= Southampton County, Virginia =

County in Virginia, United States

- County
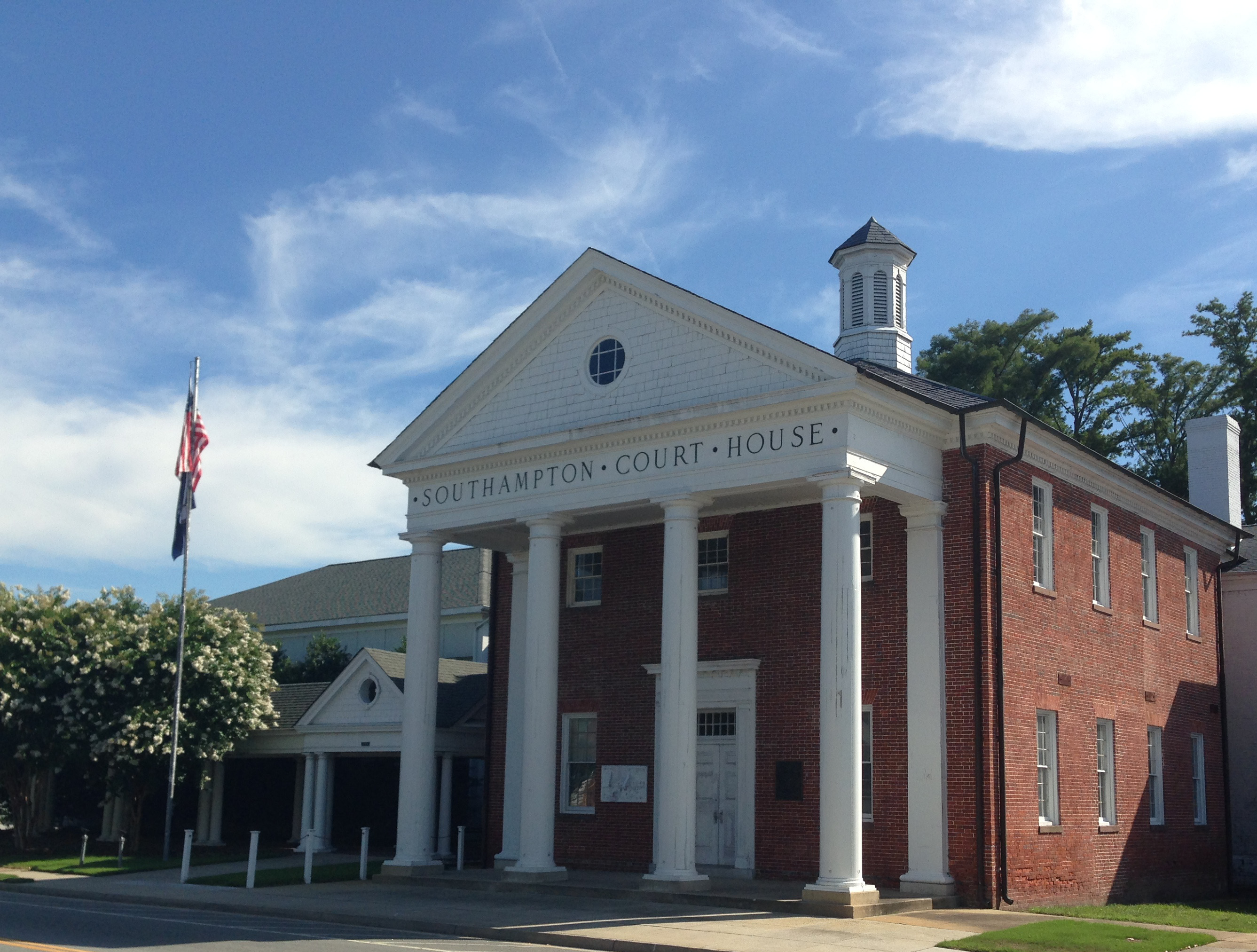
- Southampton County Courthouse

- Seal

- Location within the U.S. state of Virginia
- Coordinates: 36°46′15″N 77°09′38″W
- Country: United States
- State: Virginia
- Founded: 1749
- Named for: either Southampton, England, or Henry Wriothesley, 3rd Earl of Southampton
- Seat: Courtland
- Largest town: Courtland

Area
  - Total: 602 sq mi (1,560 km^{2})
  - Land: 599 sq mi (1,550 km^{2})
  - Water: 3.2 sq mi (8.3 km^{2}) 0.5%

Population (2020)
  - Total: 17,996
  - Estimate (2025): 18,110 ▲
  - Density: 30/sq mi (12/km^{2})
- Time zone: UTC−5 (Eastern)
  - Summer (DST): UTC−4 (EDT)
- Congressional districts: 4th, 2nd
- Website: southamptoncounty.org

Southampton County is a county located on the southern border of the Commonwealth of Virginia. North Carolina is to the south. As of the 2020 United States census, the population was 17,996. Its county seat is Courtland.

== History ==
In the early 17th century, the explorer Captain John Smith founded the settlement of Jamestown; in the next decades of the colony's history, Jamestown settlers explored and began settling the regions adjacent to Hampton Roads. The Virginia Colony was divided into eight shires (or counties) with a total population of approximately 5,000 inhabitants in 1634. Most of Southampton County was originally part of Warrosquyoake Shire. The shires were soon to be called counties. In 1637 Warrosquyoake Shire was renamed Isle of Wight County.

In 1749, the portion of Isle of Wight County west of the Blackwater River was organized as Southampton County. Later, part of Nansemond County, which is now the Independent City of Suffolk, was added to Southampton County. This area was cultivated for tobacco and later for mixed crops, dependent on the labor of enslaved African Americans after a relatively short period when many white indentured servants came to the colony.

Episodes of the slave revolt led by Nat Turner against their masters in Virginia in 1831.

In August 1831, an enslaved preacher named Nat Turner led a slave rebellion in Southampton County against local white residents, killing about 60 people. The rebellion ended, and Turner and his rebels were tried, convicted, and executed. Meanwhile, white mobs had seized and lynched nearly 200 black residents of Southampton County, most of them enslaved.

Southampton County may have been named by Virginian settlers for Southampton, a major port city in Hampshire. Alternatively, it may have been named for Henry Wriothesley, the earl of Southampton, who was one of the founders of the Virginia Company.

== Geography ==
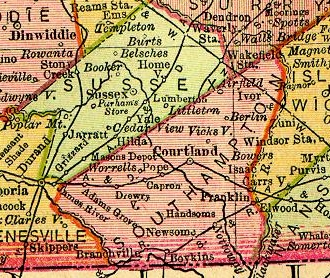
Southampton County from 1895 map of Virginia

According to the U.S. Census Bureau, the county has a total area of 602 square miles (1,560 km^{2}), of which 599 square miles (1,550 km^{2}) is land and 3.2 square miles (8.3 km^{2}) (0.5%) is water.

Southampton County is bounded by the Blackwater River on the east and the Meherrin River on the west. The Nottoway River flows through the center of the county. All three rivers are tributaries of the Chowan River, which flows south into Albemarle Sound, North Carolina. The Blackwater River separates Southampton County from Isle of Wight County, and the Meherrin River separates it from Greensville County.

=== Adjacent counties ===
- Surry County – north
- Isle of Wight County – northeast
- City of Franklin – east
- City of Suffolk – southeast
- Hertford County, North Carolina – south
- Northampton County, North Carolina – southwest
- Greensville County – west
- Sussex County – northwest

== Demographics ==
Historical population
| Census | Pop. | Note | %± |
|---|---|---|---|
| 1790 | 12,864 | | — |
| 1800 | 13,925 | | 8.2% |
| 1810 | 13,497 | | −3.1% |
| 1820 | 14,170 | | 5.0% |
| 1830 | 16,074 | | 13.4% |
| 1840 | 14,525 | | −9.6% |
| 1850 | 13,521 | | −6.9% |
| 1860 | 12,915 | | −4.5% |
| 1870 | 12,285 | | −4.9% |
| 1880 | 18,012 | | 46.6% |
| 1890 | 20,078 | | 11.5% |
| 1900 | 22,848 | | 13.8% |
| 1910 | 26,302 | | 15.1% |
| 1920 | 27,555 | | 4.8% |
| 1930 | 26,870 | | −2.5% |
| 1940 | 26,442 | | −1.6% |
| 1950 | 26,522 | | 0.3% |
| 1960 | 27,195 | | 2.5% |
| 1970 | 18,582 | | −31.7% |
| 1980 | 18,731 | | 0.8% |
| 1990 | 17,550 | | −6.3% |
| 2000 | 17,482 | | −0.4% |
| 2010 | 18,570 | | 6.2% |
| 2020 | 17,996 | | −3.1% |
| 2025 (est.) | 18,110 | ▲ | 0.6% |
U.S. Decennial Census; 1790–1960 1900–1990; 1990–2000 2010–2020

=== Racial and ethnic composition ===
Southampton County, Virginia – Racial and ethnic composition Note: the US Census treats Hispanic/Latino as an ethnic category. This table excludes Latinos from the racial categories and assigns them to a separate category. Hispanics/Latinos may be of any race.
| Race / Ethnicity (NH = Non-Hispanic) | Pop 1980 | Pop 1990 | Pop 2000 | Pop 2010 | Pop 2020 | % 1980 | % 1990 | % 2000 | % 2010 | % 2020 |
|---|---|---|---|---|---|---|---|---|---|---|
| White alone (NH) | 9,612 | 9,605 | 9,754 | 11,138 | 10,959 | 51.32% | 54.73% | 55.79% | 59.98% | 60.90% |
| Black or African American alone (NH) | 8,906 | 7,845 | 7,462 | 6,893 | 5,908 | 47.55% | 44.70% | 42.68% | 37.12% | 32.83% |
| Native American or Alaska Native alone (NH) | 18 | 15 | 30 | 52 | 56 | 0.10% | 0.09% | 0.17% | 0.28% | 0.31% |
| Asian alone (NH) | 24 | 16 | 32 | 46 | 67 | 0.13% | 0.09% | 0.18% | 0.25% | 0.37% |
| Native Hawaiian or Pacific Islander alone (NH) | x | x | 1 | 5 | 20 | x | x | 0.01% | 0.03% | 0.11% |
| Other race alone (NH) | 9 | 2 | 11 | 13 | 50 | 0.05% | 0.01% | 0.06% | 0.07% | 0.28% |
| Mixed race or Multiracial (NH) | x | x | 77 | 220 | 604 | x | x | 0.44% | 1.18% | 3.36% |
| Hispanic or Latino (any race) | 162 | 67 | 115 | 203 | 332 | 0.86% | 0.38% | 0.66% | 1.09% | 1.84% |
| Total | 18,731 | 17,550 | 17,482 | 18,570 | 17,996 | 100.00% | 100.00% | 100.00% | 100.00% | 100.00% |

=== 2020 census ===
As of the 2020 census, the county had a population of 17,996. The median age was 48.0 years. 19.4% of residents were under the age of 18 and 20.7% of residents were 65 years of age or older. For every 100 females there were 110.0 males, and for every 100 females age 18 and over there were 111.2 males age 18 and over.

The racial makeup of the county was 61.6% White, 32.9% Black or African American, 0.4% American Indian and Alaska Native, 0.4% Asian, 0.1% Native Hawaiian and Pacific Islander, 0.6% from some other race, and 4.0% from two or more races. Hispanic or Latino residents of any race comprised 1.8% of the population.

1.8% of residents lived in urban areas, while 98.2% lived in rural areas.

There were 6,801 households in the county, of which 28.2% had children under the age of 18 living with them and 27.5% had a female householder with no spouse or partner present. About 26.2% of all households were made up of individuals and 12.7% had someone living alone who was 65 years of age or older.

There were 7,724 housing units, of which 11.9% were vacant. Among occupied housing units, 75.2% were owner-occupied and 24.8% were renter-occupied. The homeowner vacancy rate was 1.6% and the rental vacancy rate was 7.4%.

=== 2010 Census ===
As of the census of 2010, there were 18,570 people, 6,279 households, and 4,502 families residing in the county. The population density was 29 people per square mile (11 people/km^{2}). There were 7,058 housing units at an average density of 12 per square mile (4.6/km^{2}).

There were 6,279 households, out of which 30.80% had children under the age of 18 living with them, 54.10% were married couples living together, 13.50% had a female householder with no husband present, and 28.30% were non-families. 24.90% of all households were made up of individuals, and 11.10% had someone living alone who was 65 years of age or older. The average household size was 2.53 and the average family size was 3.02.

In the county, the population was spread out, with 22.70% under the age of 18, 8.80% from 18 to 24, 29.20% from 25 to 44, 25.00% from 45 to 64, and 14.20% who were 65 years of age or older. The median age was 39 years. For every 100 females there were 111.70 males. For every 100 females age 18 and over, there were 112.50 males.

The median income for a household in the county was $33,995, and the median income for a family was $41,324. Males had a median income of $32,436 versus $20,831 for females. The per capita income for the county was $16,930. About 11.70% of families and 14.60% of the population were below the poverty line, including 19.90% of those under age 18 and 14.50% of those age 65 or over.

== Economy ==
Southampton County is Virginia's largest producer of peanuts and cotton. The county includes The Southampton Business Park and Southampton Commerce and Logistics Center. Its main employer is manufacturing, representing 51 percent of the county's workforce. Its main employers include Birdsong Peanuts, Envira, Hampton Farms, Paul D. Camp Community College, and Southampton Memorial Hospital.

== Arts and culture ==
Blackwater Regional Library is the regional library system that provides services to the citizens of Southampton. The Salty Southern Route is a driving tour to peanut and salt-cured ham related sites and includes Southampton County.

== Parks and recreation ==
The county operates public parks. The Nottoway River also provides recreational opportunities.

== Education ==
Educational opportunities in the county includes the Paul D. Camp Community College in adjacent Franklin, Virginia. The county is also served by Southampton High School, part of the Southampton County Public Schools. Southampton Academy, a private school for pre-kindergarten through the 12th grades.

== Infrastructure ==
=== Major highways ===
- US 58
- US 258
- US 460
- SR 35
- SR 186
- SR 189

== Communities ==
=== Towns ===
- Boykins
- Branchville
- Capron
- Courtland
- Ivor
- Newsoms

=== Census-designated places ===
- Sedley
- Southampton Meadows

=== Unincorporated communities ===
- Berlin
- Black Creek
- Drewryville
- Vicksville

== Politics ==
United States presidential election results for Southampton County, Virginia
| Year | Republican | | Democratic | | Third party(ies) | |
| Year | No. | % | No. | % | No. | % |
|---|---|---|---|---|---|---|
| 1912 | 95 | 9.38% | 861 | 85.00% | 57 | 5.63% |
| 1916 | 128 | 10.91% | 1,045 | 89.09% | 0 | 0.00% |
| 1920 | 250 | 15.80% | 1,314 | 83.06% | 18 | 1.14% |
| 1924 | 203 | 14.46% | 1,119 | 79.70% | 82 | 5.84% |
| 1928 | 648 | 43.43% | 844 | 56.57% | 0 | 0.00% |
| 1932 | 182 | 11.69% | 1,357 | 87.15% | 18 | 1.16% |
| 1936 | 148 | 8.11% | 1,673 | 91.62% | 5 | 0.27% |
| 1940 | 213 | 12.29% | 1,508 | 87.02% | 12 | 0.69% |
| 1944 | 284 | 14.99% | 1,599 | 84.38% | 12 | 0.63% |
| 1948 | 339 | 16.14% | 1,462 | 69.62% | 299 | 14.24% |
| 1952 | 1,166 | 36.70% | 2,000 | 62.95% | 11 | 0.35% |
| 1956 | 1,290 | 35.29% | 2,039 | 55.79% | 326 | 8.92% |
| 1960 | 1,263 | 30.62% | 2,804 | 67.98% | 58 | 1.41% |
| 1964 | 1,520 | 37.16% | 2,566 | 62.74% | 4 | 0.10% |
| 1968 | 1,376 | 26.15% | 1,803 | 34.26% | 2,083 | 39.59% |
| 1972 | 3,225 | 67.09% | 1,498 | 31.16% | 84 | 1.75% |
| 1976 | 2,366 | 40.18% | 3,399 | 57.72% | 124 | 2.11% |
| 1980 | 2,997 | 45.50% | 3,347 | 50.81% | 243 | 3.69% |
| 1984 | 4,669 | 57.99% | 3,300 | 40.99% | 82 | 1.02% |
| 1988 | 3,439 | 52.96% | 3,000 | 46.20% | 54 | 0.83% |
| 1992 | 2,844 | 41.37% | 3,199 | 46.54% | 831 | 12.09% |
| 1996 | 2,275 | 33.88% | 3,454 | 51.44% | 986 | 14.68% |
| 2000 | 3,293 | 49.05% | 3,359 | 50.03% | 62 | 0.92% |
| 2004 | 4,018 | 53.63% | 3,431 | 45.80% | 43 | 0.57% |
| 2008 | 4,583 | 50.55% | 4,402 | 48.55% | 82 | 0.90% |
| 2012 | 4,733 | 51.09% | 4,437 | 47.90% | 94 | 1.01% |
| 2016 | 5,035 | 56.71% | 3,595 | 40.49% | 248 | 2.79% |
| 2020 | 5,730 | 58.55% | 3,969 | 40.56% | 87 | 0.89% |
| 2024 | 6,133 | 62.23% | 3,626 | 36.79% | 97 | 0.98% |

== Notable people ==
- Bill Bailey, tap dancer who was the first person recorded doing the moonwalk dance
- Pearl Bailey, actress and singer
- Antonio Banks, gridiron football player and coach
- Earl E. Bell, Virginia House of Delegates
- Henry Taylor Blow, United States House of Representatives and Commissioner of the District of Columbia
- Benjamin Blunt, Virginia House of Delegates
- Benjamin Blunt Jr., Virginia House of Delegates and member of the Virginia Ratifying Convention
- John Brown, author and former slave
- Samuel Butts, US Army officer
- Charlotte Taylor Blow Charless, founder of the Home of the Friendless in St. Louis for elderly, indigent women
- George B. Cary, United States House of Representatives
- Colgate Darden, Governor of Virginia, United States House of Representatives, president of the University of Virginia, and Chancellor of the College of William and Mary
- Percy Ellsworth, professional football player
- Anthony W. Gardner, ninth president of Liberia
- William Y. Gholson, Justice of the Ohio Supreme Court
- Katherine Godwin, First Lady of Virginia
- S. Bernard Goodwyn, chief justice of the Supreme Court of Virginia
- John C. Gray, United States House of Representatives and Virginia House of Delegates
- Joseph Gray, House of Burgesses
- Thomas R. Gray, attorney, author, and diplomat, known for writing The Confessions of Nat Turner
- Benjamin F. Hicks, inventor
- Samuel Kello, Virginia Ratifying Convention and clerk of the Southampton County Court
- Menalcus Lankford, United States House of Representatives
- William Mahone, United States Senator, Virginia Senate, Confederate States Army general, and chief engineer of the Norfolk and Petersburg Railroad
- William V. Rawlings, Virginia Senate
- Dred Scott, enslaved man known for the Dred Scott Decision of the Supreme Court of the United States
- Hack U. Stephenson, Virginia House of Delegates
- Henry Taylor, Virginia House of Delegates and House of Burgesses
- George Henry Thomas, general in the Union Army during the American Civil War
- James Trezvant, United States House of Representatives, Virginia Senate, and Virginia House of Delegates
- William H. Tucker, Wisconsin Senate
- Edith Turner, leader of the Nottoway people
- James Turner, Governor of North Carolina, United States Senate, North Carolina Senate, and North Carolina House of Representatives
- Nat Turner, leader of a rebellion of enslaved people

== See also ==
- National Register of Historic Places listings in Southampton County, Virginia
- Nat Turner's Rebellion
