= Stephen P. Shao =

Stephen Pinyee Shao, Sr. (January 24, 1924 – September 5, 2013) was a Chinese-American professor of business management, an international author and speaker, and humanitarian. He was born in the Zhakou township of Yixing, Jiangsu, on January 24, 1924 (Agricultural Calendar December 19, 1923).

== Early life ==
Shao's early education was interrupted by the Second Sino-Japanese War, moving him from Jiangsu, Shanghai, Zhejiang, Jiangxi, Anhui, Fujing, Guangdon, and Guangxi as he fought for an education. In 1946 he graduated from the National Business Administration College in Hunan with the rank of number one in his class. He then worked two years in the National Resources Commission of China.

In August 1948, Shao traveled to the United States; for graduate studies. In 1949 he received a Master of Arts degree from Baylor University. In 1956 he obtained a PhD degree from the University of Texas. He was the first Chinese student in America to earn a doctorate in business administration.

== Career ==
Shao taught at Bluefield College, College of William and Mary, and Old Dominion University earning the rank of Full Professor in 1958. In 1977, he was a visiting professor at Chengchi University and Taiwan University in Taiwan. In 1978, he achieved the rank of Eminent Professor at Old Dominion University.

In 1980, Shao was invited to China by the State Department and the Department of Commerce to lecture. He delivered lectures of Management Science to approximately forty universities in Beijing, Harpin, Shanghai, and Nanjing. In 1992, he again returned to China to lecture. He was awarded the Honorary Professorship by Chenan Economics College.

Shao had memberships with American Statistical, Economic, Accounting, and Management Associations. He also was a member and a founder of American Institute for Decision Sciences and a founder of The Old Dominion Credit Union. He authored more than 50 college textbooks, editions, and manuals. Some examples of his books are, "Mathematics of Finance and Management", "Statistics for Business and Economics", "Mathematics and Quantitative Methods for Business and Economics", and "Essentials of Business Statistics". Many of his books have been translated into foreign languages and are used by numerous universities throughout the world. His autobiography, "Memories in Two Nations: China and the U.S.A." was published in April 2003 and there is an updated version titled, '"My Extraordinary Life"' which is expected to be available in 2016.

In 1986, Shao was the first Chinese candidate for a seat in the United States House of Representatives. The campaign for this 2nd Congressional District seat Virginia's 2nd congressional district was the most expensive campaign waged in Hampton Roads to that date. His two opponents spent more than $1.2 million, while Shao spent only $5,000 and earned 9% of the votes. The election results for the 1986 Virginia Congressional Districts with 100% of precincts reporting were: Owen B. Pickett (D) 54,368 (49%); A. J. Canada (R) 46,298 (42%); and Stephen P. Shao (I) 9,551 (9%) He ran again, also as an independent, in 1988.

== Family life ==
In 1956, Shao married Betty Outen Shao. They had four sons.

== Honors ==
On October 12, 2001, in Yixing, China, the groundbreaking ceremony for the three-story building named “Stephen P. Shao, PhD” was held next to the Xu Beihong Museum. This honor was given by the City of Yixing's City Council who recognize his struggle to complete his own education and eventually obtain a PhD degree through the Second Sino-Japanese War in China. The City Council concluded that the building should be effectively placed in the campus at the main entrance of Jiangsu Provincial Yixing High School. On September 30, 2002, the building was completed and the following year Shao, along with his family attended the official opening ceremony. In 2014, the city of Yixing, China, named Shao. as one of their "Top 60 Celebrities of the Modern Era". The Yixing Museum is currently establishing the "Contemporary Celebrity Building", dedicated to propagating the spirit of Yixing people, on reflecting contemporary outstanding achievements. Shao is one of the selected professionals. He was recognized to have significantly contributed to the development of Yixing and is part of an exhibition highlighting his life achievements.

== Death ==
Shao died on September 5, 2013. He first set foot on American soil on September 9, 1948, and he was laid to rest in American soil exactly 65 years to the day on September 9, 2013.
