= Benjamin F. Hicks =

American inventor (1847–1925)

- Benjamin F. Hicks
- Born: 1847; Southampton County, Virginia
- Died: 1925; Vicksville, Southampton County, Virginia
- Occupations: Inventor, farmer, blacksmith
- Known for: Gasoline-powered peanut picker

Benjamin F. Hicks (1847–1925) was an American inventor who was the first to patent the gasoline-powered peanut picker.

== Biography ==
=== Personal life ===
Hicks was born near St. Luke's Church in Southampton County, Virginia circa 1847. Hicks' mother, spelled Lotty or Lottie, could have been a Nottaway Indian; his father is unknown. Hicks was classified either as black or mulatto in census records. Hicks had no formal education, as it was not generally available to non-whites at the time. Benjamin and his brother received farming apprenticeships as young boys for a yearly fee of $100, which was paid to his mother.

Hicks married Margaret Chappell, a free black woman, on January 7, 1869; nine children are named in his will. Benjamin and Margaret settled in the Vicksville area, where Hicks purchased 22 acres of land in 1874. By 1890, Hicks owned 130 acres of land and had paid off his mortgage. He cleared 40 acres for farming, where he grew mostly cotton, corn, and peanuts. He opened a small machine shop on his land for additional income.

=== Inventions ===
Hicks was known among his acquaintances for his ability to invent and his skill at creating new farm machines. He was described by a federal circuit judge in 1916 as "a man of fine native intellect and mechanical genius". Using the anvil, forge, and woodworking tools in his machine shop, he built these machines mainly for use by himself and his neighbors. His most ambitious undertaking was the invention of a gasoline-powered peanut picker, which was said to have revolutionized peanut farming in the area, and for which he received a patent in 1901. He first fielded his peanut picker in 1902, finally perfecting it by the 1903 harvest.

Hicks later sold his patent to the Virginia-Carolina Peanut Picking Company. They went on to manufacture and sell peanut pickers following Hicks' design, but using more robust materials and methods of construction than were available to Hicks. The competing Benthall Machine Company also sold a peanut picker following Hicks' design, resulting in a patent dispute.

Hicks also invented a manure spreader, for which he received a patent in 1920.

=== Death and legacy ===
Hicks died in 1925 in Vicksville, Virginia. He was buried in an unmarked grave on his land. (The general grave site has since been located by his descendants.) Many of his numerous descendants still reside in the area. His descendants, in collaboration with the Southampton County Historical Society, created a historical roadside marker in Southampton County, Virginia to honor his accomplishments.
