= Southampton Meadows, Virginia =

Southampton Meadows
- CDP
- Location within the Commonwealth of Virginia
- Coordinates: 36°35′32″N 76°55′48″W
- Country: United States
- State: Virginia
- County: Southampton

Population (2020)
  - Total: 503
- Time zone: UTC−5 (Eastern (EST))
  - Summer (DST): UTC−4 (EDT)
- ZIP codes: 23851
- FIPS code: 51-73894
- GNIS feature ID: 2629845

Southampton Meadows is a mobile home community and census-designated place in southeastern Southampton County, Virginia, United States. As of the 2020 census, Southampton Meadows had a population of 503.

== Demographics ==
Historical population
Census	Pop.	Note	%±
2010	592		—
2020	503		−15.0%
U.S. Decennial Census; 2010 2020

Southampton Meadows was first listed as a census designated place in the 2010 U.S. census.

=== Racial and ethnic composition ===
Southampton Meadows CDP, Virginia – Racial and ethnic composition Note: the US Census treats Hispanic/Latino as an ethnic category. This table excludes Latinos from the racial categories and assigns them to a separate category. Hispanics/Latinos may be of any race.
Race / Ethnicity (NH = Non-Hispanic)	Pop 2010	Pop 2020	% 2010	% 2020
White alone (NH)	51	59	8.61%	11.73%
Black or African American alone (NH)	505	402	85.30%	79.92%
Native American or Alaska Native alone (NH)	1	4	0.17%	0.80%
Asian alone (NH)	0	4	0.00%	0.80%
Native Hawaiian or Pacific Islander alone (NH)	0	0	0.00%	0.00%
Other race alone (NH)	0	0	0.00%	0.00%
Mixed race or Multiracial (NH)	23	19	3.89%	3.78%
Hispanic or Latino (any race)	12	15	2.03%	2.98%
Total	592	503	100.00%	100.00%
