= Owen B. Pickett =

American politician (1930–2010)

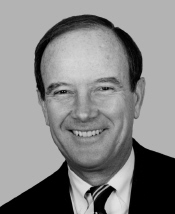

Member of the U.S. House of Representatives from Virginia's 2nd district
- In office January 3, 1987 – January 3, 2001
- Preceded by: G. William Whitehurst
- Succeeded by: Ed Schrock

Member of the Virginia House of Delegates
- In office January 12, 1972 – December 30, 1986
- Preceded by: Richard D. Guy
- Succeeded by: Glenn R. Croshaw
- Constituency: 40th district (1972‍–‍1982); 38th district (1982‍–‍1983); 81st district (1983‍–‍1986)

Chair of the Democratic Party of Virginia
- In office 1980–1982
- Preceded by: Dick Davis
- Succeeded by: Alan Diamonstein

Personal details
- Born: August 31, 1930 Richmond, Virginia, U.S.
- Died: October 27, 2010 (aged 80) Virginia Beach, Virginia, U.S.
- Party: Democratic
- Education: Virginia Tech (BS); University of Richmond (LLB)
- Profession: Politician; lawyer

Owen Bradford Pickett (August 31, 1930 – October 27, 2010) was a Democratic member of the United States House of Representatives from Virginia. He is the last Democratic representative from the district who served more than two terms.

== Early life ==
Pickett was born in Richmond, Virginia, on August 31, 1930. He graduated from Virginia Tech in 1952 and the University of Richmond School of Law in 1955. Pickett was admitted to the Virginia State bar in 1955, and practiced law in Virginia Beach, Virginia.

== State political career ==
Pickett served as a member of the Virginia House of Delegates from 1972 until 1986, representing a district centered on Virginia Beach. During this time, he also served as chairman of the Democratic Party of Virginia from 1980 until 1982.

Pickett was considered the unopposed favorite for the Democratic nomination for the U.S. Senate in 1982 to run for the seat of retiring Democratic-turned-independent U.S. Senator Harry F. Byrd Jr. In announcing his candidacy, Pickett paid tribute to the Byrd Organization, the political "machine" led by Senator Byrd's father, the late Virginia Governor and U.S. Senator Harry F. Byrd, Sr. The reference enraged State Senator L. Douglas Wilder of Richmond, who found Pickett's glowing references to a political machine that supported segregation unacceptable. Wilder said he would mount an independent candidacy if Pickett won the Democratic nomination. Pickett realized that Wilder was serious, and concluded that he would likely lose a three-way race with Wilder and the Republican nominee, Congressman Paul Trible. He pulled out of the race, and the Democrats instead nominated Lt. Governor Richard Joseph Davis, who lost narrowly to Trible in the 1982 general election.

== Congressional career ==
Meanwhile, voters of Virginia's 2nd congressional district elected Pickett in 1986 to become their U.S. Representative. Re-elected several times (and facing no opponent in 1998), Pickett represented the district from January 3, 1987, until January 3, 2001, announcing in 2000 that he was not a candidate for reelection to the 107th Congress. The Owen B. Pickett U.S. Custom House in Norfolk, Virginia, was named in his honor in 2001.

=== Electoral history ===
- 1986; Pickett defeated Republican A. Joe Canada Jr. and Independent Stephen P. Shao, winning 49.48% of the vote.
- 1988; Pickett defeated Republican Jerry R. Curry and Independents Stephen P. Shao and Robert A. Smith, winning 60.55% of the vote.
- 1990; Pickett defeated Independent Harry G. Broskie, winning 77.61% of the vote.
- 1992; Pickett defeated Republican J.L. Chapman, winning 56.03% of the vote.
- 1994; Pickett defeated Republican Chapman, winning 59.05% of the vote.
- 1996; Pickett defeated Republican John F. Tate, winning 57.72% of the vote.
- 1998; Pickett was unopposed for re-election in 1998.

== Death ==
Pickett died on October 27, 2010, after several years of ill health.

== Electoral history ==
Virginia's 2nd congressional district election, 1986
| Party | Candidate | Votes | % |
|---|---|---|---|
| Democratic | Owen B. Pickett | 54,491 | 49.46% |
| Republican | A. Joe Canada Jr. | 46,137 | 41.88% |
| Independent | Stephen P. Shao | 9,492 | 8.62% |
| Write-in | | 49 | 0.04% |
| Total votes | | 110,169 | 100% |
| Democratic gain from Republican | | | |

Virginia's 2nd congressional district election, 1988
| Party | Candidate | Votes | % |
|---|---|---|---|
| Democratic | Owen B. Pickett (Incumbent) | 106,666 | 60.53% |
| Republican | Jerry R. Curry | 62,564 | 35.51% |
| Independent | Stephen P. Shao | 4,255 | 2.41% |
| Independent | Robert A. Smith | 2,691 | 1.53% |
| Write-in | | 32 | 0.02% |
| Total votes | | 176,208 | 100% |
| Democratic hold | | | |

Virginia's 2nd congressional district election, 1990
| Party | Candidate | Votes | % |
|---|---|---|---|
| Democratic | Owen B. Pickett (Incumbent) | 55,179 | 74.95% |
| Independent | Harry G. Broskie | 15,915 | 21.62% |
| Write-in | | 2,524 | 3.43% |
| Total votes | | 73,618 | 100% |
| Democratic hold | | | |

Virginia's 2nd congressional district election, 1992
| Party | Candidate | Votes | % |
|---|---|---|---|
| Democratic | Owen B. Pickett (Incumbent) | 99,253 | 56.03% |
| Republican | J. L. Chapman IV | 77,797 | 43.92% |
| Write-in | | 83 | 0.05% |
| Total votes | | 177,133 | 100% |
| Democratic hold | | | |

Virginia's 2nd congressional district election, 1994
| Party | Candidate | Votes | % |
|---|---|---|---|
| Democratic | Owen B. Pickett (Incumbent) | 81,372 | 59.05% |
| Republican | J. L. Chapman IV | 56,375 | 40.91% |
| Write-in | | 55 | 0.04% |
| Total votes | | 137,802 | 100% |
| Democratic hold | | | |

Virginia's 2nd congressional district election, 1996
| Party | Candidate | Votes | % |
|---|---|---|---|
| Democratic | Owen B. Pickett (Incumbent) | 106,215 | 64.77% |
| Republican | John F. Tate | 57,586 | 35.11% |
| Write-in | | 195 | 0.12% |
| Total votes | | 163,996 | 100% |
| Democratic hold | | | |

Virginia's 2nd congressional district election, 1998
| Party | Candidate | Votes | % |
|---|---|---|---|
| Democratic | Owen B. Pickett (Incumbent) | 67,975 | 94.29% |
| Write-in | | 4,116 | 5.71% |
| Total votes | | 72,091 | 100% |
| Democratic hold | | | |

U.S. House of Representatives
| Preceded by G. William Whitehurst | Member of the U.S. House of Representatives from Virginia's 2nd congressional district 1987–2001 | Succeeded by Edward Schrock |
