= George E. Bowden =

American politician

George Edwin Bowden
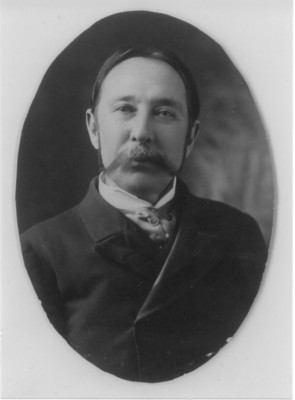

Member of the U.S. House of Representatives from Virginia's 2nd district
- In office March 4, 1887 – March 3, 1891
- Preceded by: Harry Libbey
- Succeeded by: John W. Lawson

Personal details
- Born: July 6, 1852 Williamsburg, Virginia
- Died: January 22, 1908 (aged 55) Norfolk, Virginia
- Party: Republican
- Profession: lawyer

George Edwin Bowden (July 6, 1852 – January 22, 1908) was a U.S. representative from Virginia, nephew of Lemuel Jackson Bowden.

== Biography ==
Born in Williamsburg, Virginia, Bowden attended a private school. He studied law. He was admitted to the bar but never practiced. He engaged in banking. He served as collector of customs for the port of Norfolk from September 1879 until May 1885.

Bowden was elected as a Republican to the Fiftieth and Fifty-first Congresses (March 4, 1887 – March 3, 1891). He was an unsuccessful candidate for reelection in 1890 to the Fifty-second Congress. He served as again collector of customs for the port of Norfolk. He served as clerk of the United States Court for the Eastern District of Virginia from March 10, 1899, until his death in Norfolk, Virginia, January 22, 1908. He was interred in Elmwood Cemetery.

== Elections ==
- 1886; Bowden was elected to the U.S. House of Representatives defeating Democrat Marshall Parks, winning 60.72% of the vote.
- 1888; Bowden was re-elected defeating Democrat Richard C. Marshall and Independent Republican Andrew Williams, winning 58.69% of the vote.
- 1890; Bowden lost his re-election bid to Democrat John William Lawson.

== Sources ==
- United States Congress. "George E. Bowden (id: B000677)". Biographical Directory of the United States Congress.

U.S. House of Representatives
Preceded by Harry Libbey	Member of the U.S. House of Representatives from Virginia's 2nd congressional district 1887–1891	Succeeded by John W. Lawson
