= Sedley, Virginia =

Census-designated place in Virginia, US

- Unincorporated Community
- Interactive map of Sedley, Virginia
- Coordinates: 36.776111°N 76.984167°W
- Established: 1760's

Area
  - Unincorporated Community: 8.8 km^{2} (3.4 sq mi)
  - Land: 94.8 km^{2} (36.62 sq mi)
  - Water: 0.88 km^{2} (0.34 sq mi)
  - Rural: 94.8 km^{2} (36.62 sq mi)
- Elevation: 27 m (89 ft)

Population (2020)
  - Unincorporated Community: 517
  - Estimate (2024): 568
  - Density: 5.45/km^{2} (14.1/sq mi)
- Time zone: UTC-5 (Eastern (EST))
  - Summer (DST): UTC-4 (EST)
- ZIP codes: 23878
- Area code: 757
- GNIS feature ID: 1498305

Sedley, Virginia

Sedley is an unincorporated community, census-designated place (CDP) in the middle of Southampton County, Virginia, United States. The population as of the 2020 Census was 517. It lies at an elevation of 89 feet (27 m).

== Demographics ==
Historical population
Census	Pop.	Note	%±
2010	470		—
2020	517		10.0%
2024 (est.)	568	▲	9.9%
U.S. Decennial Census; 2010 2020

=== Racial and ethnic composition ===
Sedley CDP, Virginia – Racial and ethnic composition Note: the US Census treats Hispanic/Latino as an ethnic category. This table excludes Latinos from the racial categories and assigns them to a separate category. Hispanics/Latinos may be of any race.
Race / Ethnicity (NH = Non-Hispanic)	Pop 2010	Pop 2020	% 2010	% 2020
White alone (NH)	407	443	86.60%	85.69%
Black or African American alone (NH)	55	39	11.70%	7.54%
Native American or Alaska Native alone (NH)	1	5	0.21%	0.97%
Asian alone (NH)	2	0	0.43%	0.00%
Native Hawaiian or Pacific Islander alone (NH)	0	0	0.00%	0.00%
Other race alone (NH)	0	0	0.00%	0.00%
Mixed race or Multiracial (NH)	5	16	1.06%	3.09%
Hispanic or Latino (any race)	0	14	0.00%	2.71%
Total	470	517	100.00%	100.00%

Sedley was first listed as a census designated place in the 2010 U.S. census.

== Peanuts ==
Sedley is home to the Hubbard Peanut Company which was founded in 1954 by Dot and HJ Hubbard. The company host's an annual peanut harvest. Dot Hubbard is credited with pioneering the peanut industry by manufacturing and shipping canned peanuts at a time when no one else was doing it. On October 25, 2023, Hubbard Peanut Company celebrated its 70th anniversary.
