= Benjamin Blunt Jr. =

American politician (1762–1827)

Benjamin Blunt

Member of the Virginia House of Delegates representing Southampton County
- In office December 3, 1810 – May 16, 1813 Serving with Griffin Stith, Jeremiah Cobb
- Preceded by: George Gurley
- Succeeded by: Francis Ridley

Personal details
- Born: 1734 Southampton County, Virginia Virginia Colony, British America
- Died: 1799 (aged 64–65)
- Profession: Planter, military officer, politician

Benjamin Blunt (1762 – 1827) was a horse breeder and politician from Southampton County who represented the county for three terms in the Virginia House of Delegates. Due to several generations of man named Benjamin Blunt in this family, genealogists disagree as to whether his father was Col. Benjamin Blunt who served in the American Revolutionary War as well as in the Virginia Ratifying Convention and one term in the Virginia House of Delegates, or his brother John.

Southampton County voters elected Blunt and veteran delegate Griffin Stith as their delegates to the Virginia House of Delegates in 1810 and the following year either re-elected the pair or chose a younger man named Benjamin Blunt as their other delegate (a part-time position). In 1812 Blunt was elected alongside Jeremiah Cobb before Francis Ridley replaced him in 1813.

This Benjamin Blunt may have married Ann Edwards in 1790, and Margaret Kello in 1811. The younger Benjamin Blunt (possibly with another relative of the same name) owned 13 or 55 slaves in the 1810 census. In 1826 one of those man freed his elderly slave Anthony, who requested the legislature to take pity on his advanced age (over 60 years old) and allow him to remain in the county, but which petition was denied. That Blunt died by 1827 but his estate was not yet settled nearly five years later. Two of his former slaves (Ben and Luke) were asked to join Nat Turner's rebellion (which visited the plantation of his relative Dr. Simon Blunt) but only Ben did so and was among the last hanged, on December 20, 1831.
