= National Register of Historic Places listings in Lunenburg County, Virginia =

Location of Lunenburg County in Virginia

This is a list of the National Register of Historic Places listings in Lunenburg County, Virginia.

This is intended to be a complete list of the properties and districts on the National Register of Historic Places in Lunenburg County, Virginia, United States. The locations of National Register properties and districts for which the latitude and longitude coordinates are included below, may be seen in an online map.

There are 11 properties and districts listed on the National Register in the county.

This National Park Service list is complete through NPS recent listings posted March 6, 2026.

== Current listings ==
	Name on the Register	Image	Date listed	Location	City or town	Description
1	Bechelbronn	Bechelbronn	May 8, 2008 (#08000389)	1223 Rubermont Rd. 37°04′03″N 78°10′45″W	Victoria	
2	Brickland	Brickland	June 1, 2005 (#05000524)	6877 Brickland Rd. 36°52′53″N 78°05′15″W	Kenbridge	
3	Eubank Hall	Eubank Hall	March 29, 2007 (#07000233)	319 Eubanks Rd. 36°57′12″N 78°28′26″W	Fort Mitchell	
4	Fifth Avenue Historic District	Fifth Avenue Historic District	February 22, 2006 (#06000066)	100-500 blocks of E. 5th Ave. 36°57′38″N 78°07′11″W	Kenbridge	
5	Flat Rock	Flat Rock	May 21, 1979 (#79003051)	Southwest of Kenbridge on Plank Rd. 36°56′16″N 78°08′57″W	Kenbridge	
6	Fort Mitchell Depot	Fort Mitchell Depot	August 20, 2009 (#09000640)	5570-5605 Fort Mitchell Dr. 36°55′04″N 78°29′05″W	Fort Mitchell	
7	Jones Farm	Jones Farm	September 27, 1996 (#96001052)	Afton Grove Rd., approximately 0.75 miles north of its junction with Brickland Rd. 36°54′02″N 78°06′44″W	Kenbridge	
8	Lunenburg Courthouse Historic District	Lunenburg Courthouse Historic District	February 23, 1972 (#72001509)	Junction of State Routes 40 and 49 with Hardy Rd. 36°57′42″N 78°15′58″W	Lunenburg	
9	Spring Bank	Spring Bank	August 16, 2007 (#07000825)	1070 Courthouse Rd. 36°52′12″N 78°24′38″W	Lunenburg Courthouse	
10	Victoria High School	Victoria High School	January 22, 1996 (#95001561)	Junction of 8th St. and Lee Ave. 36°59′46″N 78°13′28″W	Victoria	
11	Woodburn		February 23, 2021 (#100006177)	673 Meherrin River Rd. 36°53′52″N 78°26′50″W	Chase City vicinity	

== See also ==
- List of National Historic Landmarks in Virginia
- National Register of Historic Places listings in Virginia
