= Lunenburg Courthouse Historic District =

Historic district in Virginia, United States

- U.S. National Register of Historic Places
- U.S. Historic district
- Virginia Landmarks Register
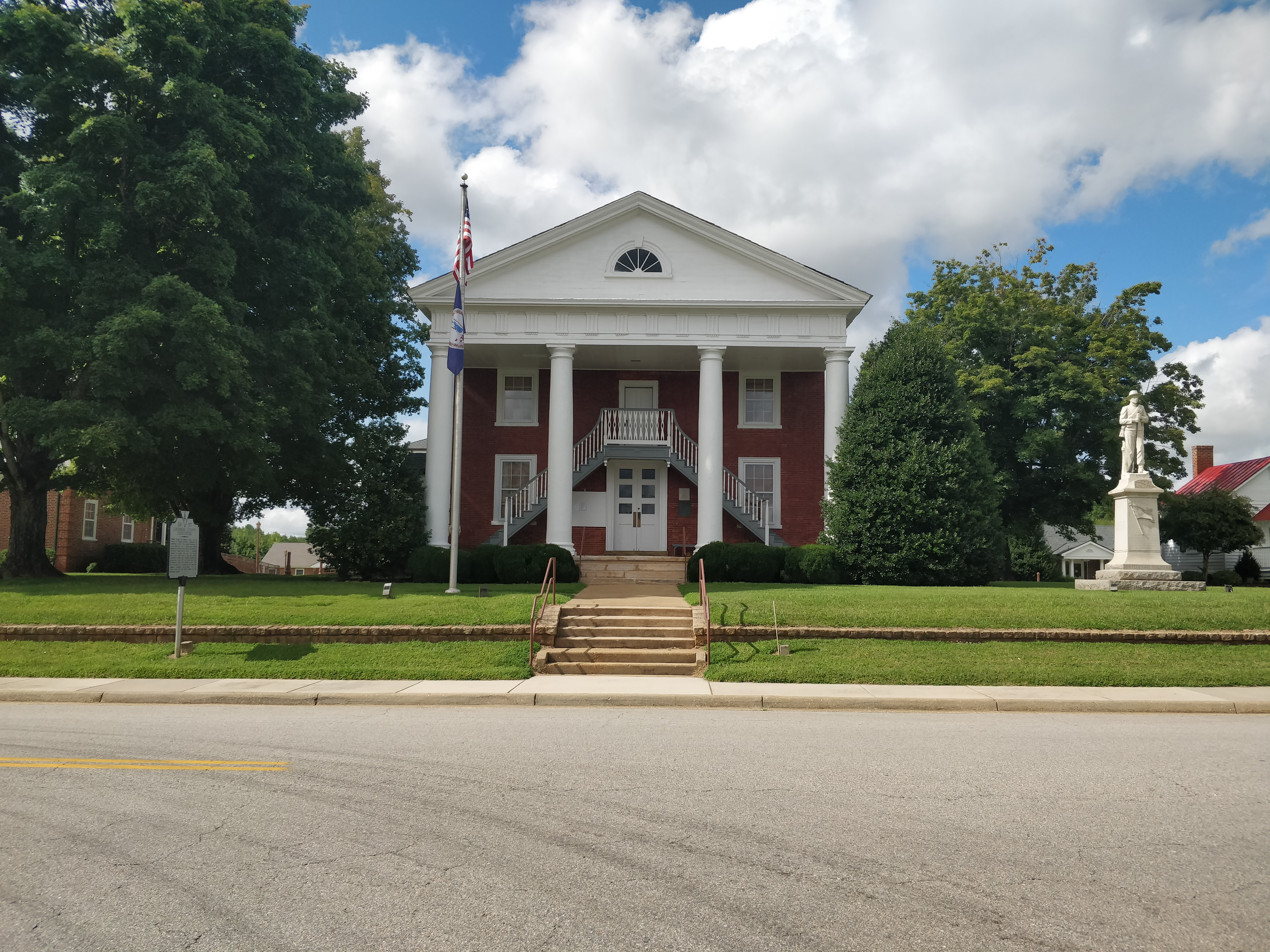
- Lunenburg Courthouse, July 2018

- Location within Virginia Location within the United States
- Location: Jct. of SR 40 and 49 and CR 675, Lunenburg, Virginia
- Coordinates: 36°57′35″N 78°16′00″W
- Area: 140 acres (57 ha)
- Built: 1827
- Architectural style: Early Republic, Roman Revival
- NRHP reference No.: 72001509
- VLR No.: 055-0105

Significant dates
- Added to NRHP: February 23, 1972
- Designated VLR: March 2, 1971

Lunenburg Courthouse Historic District is a historic courthouse building and national historic district located at the village of Lunenberg, Lunenburg County, Virginia. The courthouse was built in 1827, and is a two-story, three-bay, brick temple-form building fronted by a tetrastyle Roman Doric order portico. It is six bays deep with two of the bays added in an expansion in 1939. Associated with the courthouse was a large, hipped-roofed frame house which was once an inn known as the Lunenburg State Inn.

The oldest structure within the Courthouse Historic District is a building built in 1799 called Rosewood, and has since operated as a tavern, judge's house, residence, inn, post office, store and is now a cafe and tea room. The architecture design was based on the colony to nation period of architecture in Lunenburg County, and retains many of its original features such as the building structure, period fireplaces and wooden flooring and beams.

The historic district was listed on the National Register of Historic Places in 1972.
