= Oral Oaks, Virginia =

Unincorporated community in Virginia, United States

- Unincorporated community
- Location within Virginia Location within the United States
- Coordinates: 36°54′55″N 78°11′45″W
- Country: United States
- State: Virginia
- County: Lunenburg
- Elevation: 492 ft (150 m)
- Time zone: UTC-5 (Eastern (EST))
  - Summer (DST): UTC-4 (EDT)
- GNIS feature ID: 1477594

Oral Oaks is an unincorporated community in Lunenburg County, Virginia, United States. Its post office is closed.
