= Lunenburg County Public Schools =

School district in Virginia, United States

Address
- 1009 Main Street P.O. Box 710 Kenbridge, 36.9659°N 78.1557°W, Virginia, 23944; United States

District information
- Type: Public
- Grades: Pre-K through 12
- Established: 1907
- Superintendent: Dr. Sharon H. Stanislas
- School board: 7 members
- Chair of the board: Melanie B. Currin
- Governing agency: Virginia Department of Education
- Schools: 4

Other information
- Website: www.lunenburgcountyschools.org

Lunenburg County Public Schools is a school division in Virginia that serves the students of Lunenburg County, Virginia. The district administers four schools: two elementary schools, one middle school, and one high school.

== Administration ==
The superintendent of Lunenburg County Public Schools is Dr. Sharon H. Stanislas. Prior to her appointment in 2023, Stanislas served as the district's acting superintendent and as district's Director of Secondary Curriculum and Instruction.

=== School Board ===
The Lunenburg County School Board has seven members:

- Melanie B. Currin, Chairperson
- Shannon Hinkle. Vice Chairperson
- Amy N. McClure
- Doug Aubel
- Ruby B. Ingram
- Tony Craven
- Dr. Kendall Lee

== Schools ==
Lunenburg County has four schools, all of which are accredited, though Central High School is accredited with conditions.

Secondary Schools

- Central High School (Grades 9–12)
- Lunenburg Middle School (Grades 6–8)

Elementary Schools

- Kenbridge Elementary School (Grades PreK-5)
- Victoria Elementary School (Grades PreK-5)
