= Cralle =

Cralle is a surname. Notable people with the surname include:

- Alfred L. Cralle (1866–1919), African-American businessman and inventor
- Chris Cralle (born 1988), American hammer thrower
