= Eubank Hall =

Historic house in Virginia, United States

- U.S. National Register of Historic Places
- Virginia Landmarks Register
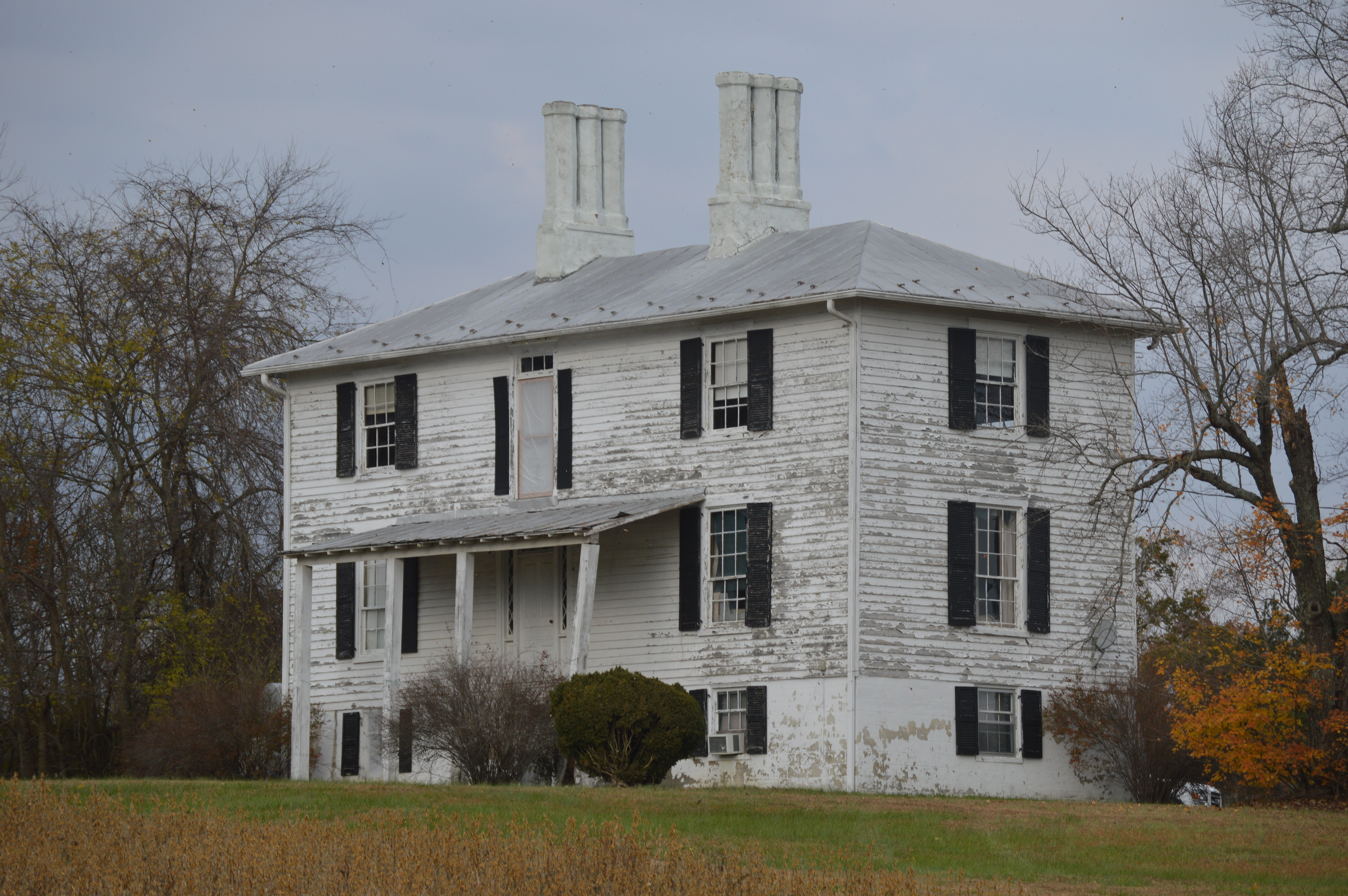
- Rear and southeastern side

- Location within Virginia Location within the United States
- Location: 319 Eubank Rd., near Fort Mitchell, Virginia
- Coordinates: 36°57′12.5″N 78°28′26″W
- Area: 141.1 acres (57.1 ha)
- Built: c. 1790, c. 1846
- Architectural style: Colonial, Mid 19th Century Revival
- NRHP reference No.: 07000233
- VLR No.: 055-0038

Significant dates
- Added to NRHP: March 29, 2007
- Designated VLR: March 20, 2008

Eubank Hall, also known as Haleysburg and Eubank Plantation, is a historic home located near Fort Mitchell, Lunenburg County, Virginia. It is an L-shaped dwelling, consisting of a 1 1/2-story frame, square, single-pen house built about 1790, with a later two-story frame addition, and a three-story, frame, single-pile addition added about 1846. It has a hipped roof and features two Jacobean-style chimneys. Also on the property is the contributing foundation of a kitchen.

It was listed on the National Register of Historic Places in 2007.
