= Lunenburg County =

Lunenburg County can refer to:

- Lunenburg County, Nova Scotia, Canada
- Lunenburg County, Virginia, United States
