= Spring Bank (Lunenburg Courthouse, Virginia) =

Historic house in Virginia, United States

- U.S. National Register of Historic Places
- Virginia Landmarks Register
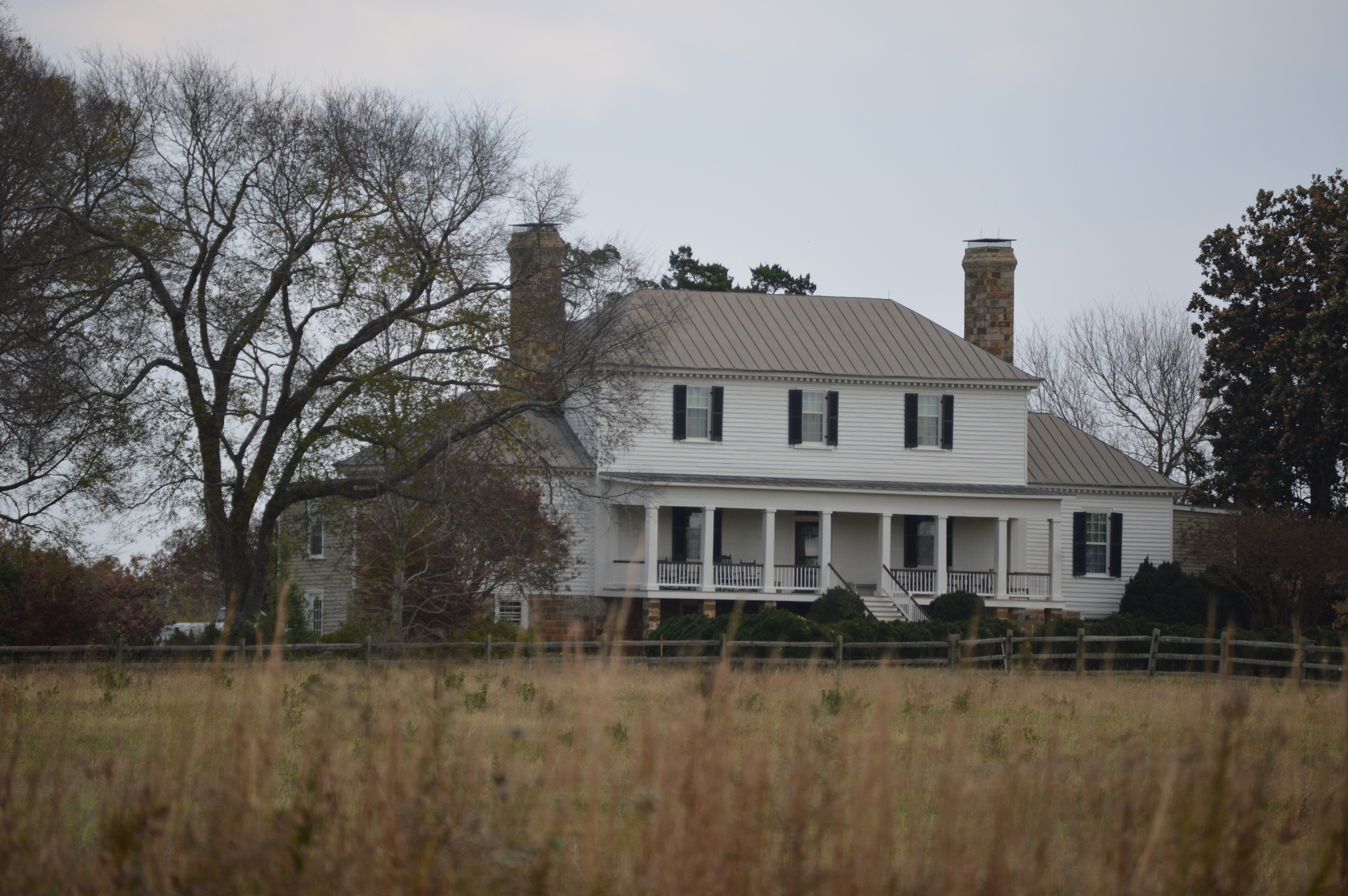
- Roadside view

- Location within Virginia Location within the United States
- Location: 1070 Courthouse Rd., near Lunenburg, Virginia
- Coordinates: 36°52′12″N 78°24′38″W
- Area: 150 acres (61 ha)
- Built: c. 1793
- Built by: Jacob Shelor; John Inge
- Architectural style: Georgian
- NRHP reference No.: 07000825
- VLR No.: 055-0017

Significant dates
- Added to NRHP: August 16, 2007
- Designated VLR: June 6, 2007

Spring Bank, also known as Ravenscroft and Magnolia Grove, is a historic plantation house located near Lunenburg, Lunenburg County, Virginia. It was built about 1793, and is a five-part Palladian plan frame dwelling in the Late Georgian style. It is composed of a two-story, three-bay center block flanked by one-story, one-bay, hipped roof wings with one-story, one-bay shed-roofed wings at the ends. Also on the property are the contributing smokehouse, a log slave quarter, and frame tobacco barn, and the remains of late-18th or early-19th century dependencies, including a kitchen/laundry, ice house, spring house, and a dam. Also located on the property are a family cemetery and two other burial grounds. It was built by John Stark Ravenscroft (1772–1830), who became the first Bishop of the Episcopal Diocese of North Carolina, serving from 1823 to 1830.

It was listed on the National Register of Historic Places in 2007.
