= Lunenburg Correctional Center =

Prison in Virginia, United States

Coordinates: 37°00′59″N 78°12′38″W

- Interactive map of Lunenburg Correctional Center
- Location: 690 Falls Road Victoria, Virginia
- Status: mixed
- Capacity: 1185
- Opened: 1995
- Managed by: Virginia Department of Corrections

The Lunenburg Correctional Center is a state prison for men located in Victoria, Lunenburg County, Virginia, owned and operated by the Virginia Department of Corrections.

The facility was opened in 1995 and has a daily working population of 1185 inmates, held at a range of security levels.

== Notable inmates ==
Willie Ben Jones: Serial killer
