= John Stark Ravenscroft =

American bishop (1772–1830)

The Right Reverend John Stark Ravenscroft D.D., S.T.D.
- Bishop of North Carolina
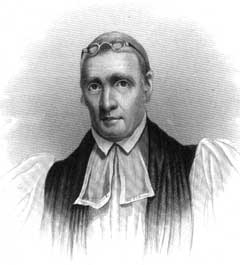
- Church: Episcopal Church
- Diocese: North Carolina
- Elected: April 12, 1823
- In office: 1823–1830
- Successor: Levi Silliman Ives

Orders
- Ordination: May 6, 1817 by Richard Channing Moore
- Consecration: May 22, 1823 by William White

Personal details
- Born: May 17, 1772 Prince George County, Colony of Virginia, British America
- Died: March 5, 1830 (aged 57) Raleigh, North Carolina, United States
- Buried: Christ Episcopal Church (Raleigh, North Carolina)
- Denomination: Anglican
- Parents: John Ravenscroft & Lillias Miller
- Spouse: Anne Spotswood Burwell (m. 1792, d. 1814); Sarah Buford (m. 1818, d. 1829)

John Stark Ravenscroft (May 17, 1772 – March 5, 1830) was the first Bishop of the Episcopal Diocese of North Carolina and helped organize the Episcopal Diocese of Tennessee.

== Early life ==
Ravenscroft was born in 1772 on his family plantation near Petersburg in Prince George County, Virginia, to parents (physician John Ravenscroft and the former Lilias Miller) who were both descendants of the powerful Colonel Robert Bolling. Because their Loyalist sympathies made the political situation unstable, when John was an infant his family moved to Scotland, where he received his earliest education.

Upon his father's death in 1788, Ravenscroft returned to Virginia to manage the family lands, as well as pursue their Loyalist indemnification claims. At age 17, he enrolled at the College of William & Mary to prepare for a legal career under the guidance of George Wythe and St. George Tucker. However, the wealthy young man also had extracurricular activities which, with his hot temper, earned him the nickname "Mad Jack". Eventually, he returned to Scotland to finish settling his father's estate.

Returning again to Virginia, Ravenscroft married well, to Ann Spottswood Burwell, in 1792, and gave up his passions for gambling and horse racing. His wife's father (Col. Lewis Burwell) helped finance construction of their estate near his using locally noteworthy craftsmen Jacob Shelor and John Inge). Soon the Ravenscrofts began living at Spring Bank in Lunenburg County. He later claimed that for eighteen years, he "never bent his knees in prayer, nor did he once open a Bible."

Around 1810 Ravenscroft experienced a religious conversion, and he and Ann joined a group known as "Republican Methodists". After three years, he was asked to become a leader of the community, but Ann died on August 5, 1815. About a year later, Ravenscroft decided to become a minister, but harbored doubts as to whether every Christian denomination (including the Republican Methodists) were valid and authorized by scriptures, and especially their fitness to perform sacraments. His great grandfather Capt. Samuel Ravenscroft had emigrated to Boston in 1679 and helped found the first Anglican Church in that city. His son (this Ravenscroft's father) Thomas had moved to James City County, and then Prince George County, Virginia where he represented his neighbors in the House of Burgesses as well as acquired land to the south along the Meherrin River and the North Carolina border. This old-line Virginian family had been long members of the Church of England. However, its successor in America, the Episcopal Church was disestablished after the Revolutionary War in both Virginia and North Carolina, and that denomination almost became extinct in the south. Rev. James Craig had retired or left the Meherrin River/Lunenburg County by 1795 and evangelical denominations predominated—Presbyterians led by the Caldwells, Baptists founding the multi-ethnic Meherrin Baptist Church as well as the Cedar Creek Baptist Church, and Methodists visiting the area as part of their Brunswick Circuit included Francis Asbury and Thomas Coke. Nonetheless, as the Second Great Awakening began, Virginia's Episcopal Church was reviving. Richard Channing Moore become its bishop and happily confirmed Ravenscroft as an Episcopalian.

== Ministry ==
On April 25, 1817, Moore ordained the 45-year-old Ravenscroft as a deacon at the Monumental Church, Richmond, Virginia, and eleven days later advanced him to the priesthood in St. George's Episcopal Church, Fredericksburg. Ravenscroft was assigned a parish near his home: St. James Parish in Boydton, in Mecklenburg County (split off from Lunenburg County) and the terminus of an important plank road to Petersburg. He also remarried, to Sarah, who would also have no children and die on January 15, 1829, about a year before her husband.

Meanwhile, Moore, who was also Monumental Church's rector as well as supervised the Episcopal churches in both Virginia and North Carolina, asked Ravenscroft to become his assistant. Ravenscroft probably needed the additional income, for his plantation (which he had increased from 610 acres to over 2100 acres), was foreclosed upon in 1824. However, future bishop of Mississippi William Mercer Green informed Ravenscroft that he had been elected Bishop of the recently re-organized diocese of North Carolina which adjoined both Lunenberg and Mecklenburg counties (Charles Pettigrew had been elected its bishop in 1794 but had never been consecrated due to the cancellations of the General Conventions of 1795 and 1798 due to yellow fever and his subsequent infirmities making travel difficult). Although the annual salary offered was just $750, the offer also included the rectorship of Christ Church in Raleigh. Thus, at the General Convention in Old St. Paul's Episcopal Church, Philadelphia, bishops William White, James Kemp and Alexander Griswold, among others, consecrated Ravenscroft as the 20th bishop in the Episcopal Church on May 22, 1823.

A dedicated high churchman, but with evangelical spirit, Ravenscroft was known for his booming voice and strident promotion of the Episcopal Church, including his own story of knowing sin and being saved by God's grace. He attended several General Conventions, as well as every diocesan convention. His missionary journeys beginning in 1818 took him over the Cumberland Gap into Tennessee and Kentucky. He confirmed Tennessee's future first bishop, James Hervey Otey, during his 1824 visitation. During his last such trip, on July 1, 1829, he chaired the organizational convention of what eventually became the Episcopal Diocese of Tennessee. Travel or other circumstances, however, took a toll, and in 1828 he gave up the rectorship in Raleigh in favor of the smaller St. John's Church in Williamsboro where his protege Rev. Green lived.

Ravenscroft mentored several priests who later became pioneering southern bishops, including Green and Otey, although he also unsuccessfully opposed the consecration of William Meade as Moore's assistant in Virginia in 1829 on the grounds that Meade compromised too much with other Protestant denominations. In December 1824, Ravenscroft gave a sermon to the annual meeting of the Bible Society of North Carolina which caused much controversy because he asserted that the Bible could not be properly studied without a qualified teacher. Ravenscroft then engaged in a theological duel of sorts over the content of his sermon with Presbyterian theology professor John Rice. Not one to mince words, spoken or printed, Ravenscroft published a defense of his beliefs and character in 1826 as The Doctrines of the Church Vindicated from the Misrepresentations of Dr. John Rice, and the Integrity of Revealed Religion Defended against the "No Comment Principle" of Promiscuous Bible Societies. Ravenscroft also criticized Lutheran theology, and Baptist theology, as well as the notion that a clean life alone assured salvation.

Three universities awarded him doctorate of divinity degrees: Columbia University, the College of William & Mary, and the University of North Carolina at Chapel Hill.

== Death and legacy ==
After his second wife's death in 1829, Ravenscroft decided to move to Fayetteville, but died at a friend's house in Raleigh en route. He was buried in the chancel of his former church in Raleigh, which was rebuilt several years later. By the time he died, the diocese (which had 3 clergy and 200 laity when organized in 1817 and 7 clergy and 480 communicants when Ravenscroft took office in 1823) had 11 clergymen and 650 lay members.

His successor Bishop Levi Silliman Ives (also a high churchman) worked tirelessly to establish a school for boys in the diocese, which was established at Asheville and named after Ravenscroft. After the American Civil War, the Ravenscroft Institute (which by then had a high school for boys and a school for ministry) was reorganized by bishop Atkinson to concentrate on theological training and competed to become a seminary of the Episcopal Church, but lost the competition to University of the South at Sewanee, Tennessee, although the school for boys was reorganized as a private school with a headmaster in the 1880s.

His limited papers are held by the University of North Carolina at Chapel Hill and at Duke University, and many published online by Project Canterbury.

Episcopal Church (USA) titles
New diocese Established 1817	Bishop of North Carolina; 1823–1830	Succeeded by Levi Silliman Ives
