= Fort Mitchell station =

- Fort Mitchell Depot
- U.S. National Register of Historic Places
- Virginia Landmarks Register
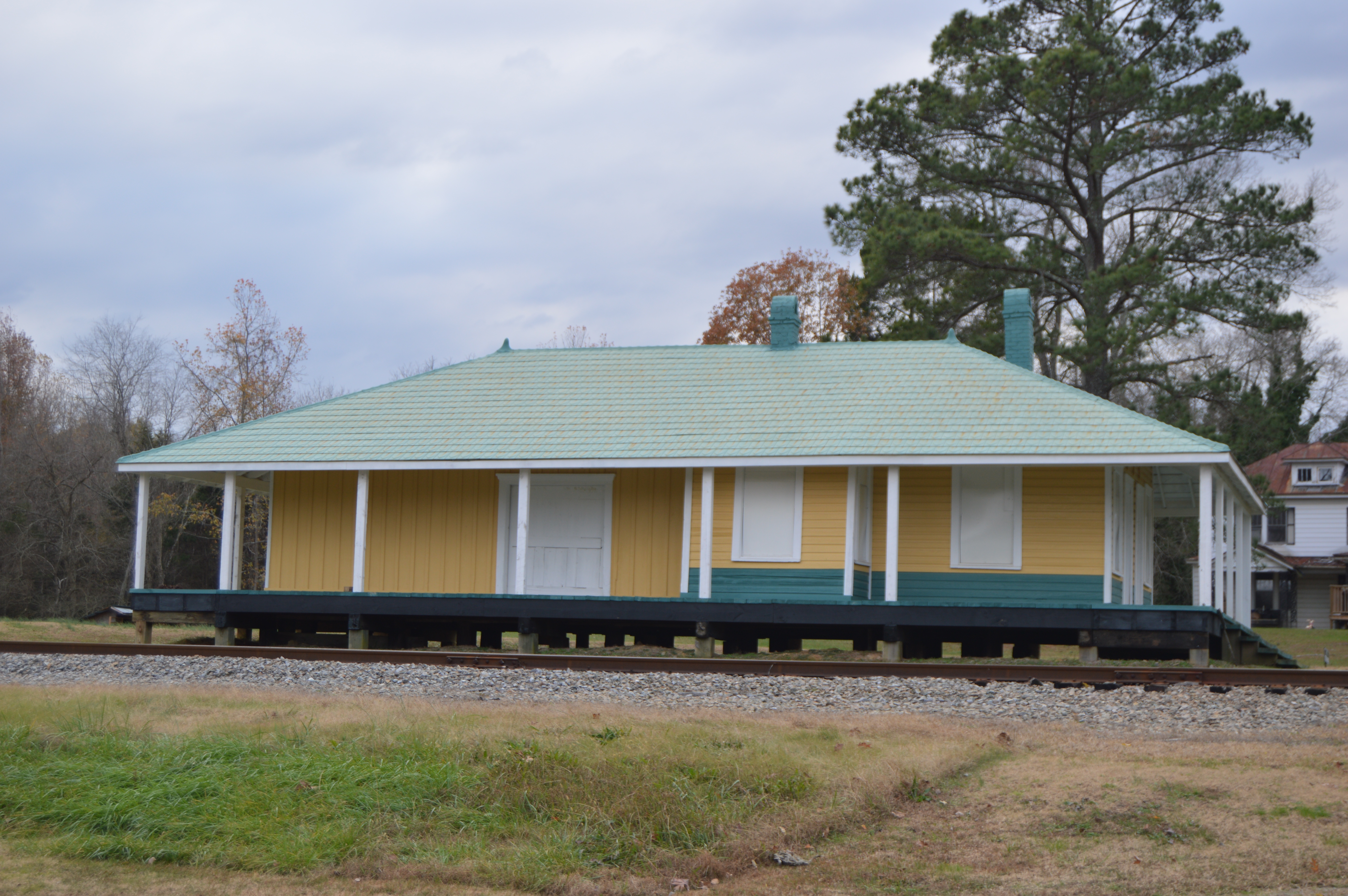
- Eastern side

- Location within Virginia Location within the United States
- Location: 5570-5605 Fort Mitchell Dr., Fort Mitchell, Virginia
- Coordinates: 36°55′4″N 78°29′5.5″W
- Area: less than one acre
- Built: c. 1860, c. 1884
- Architectural style: Late 19th And Early 20th Century American Movements
- NRHP reference No.: 09000640
- VLR No.: 055-5097

Significant dates
- Added to NRHP: August 20, 2009
- Designated VLR: June 18, 2009

Fort Mitchell Depot is a historic railway depot located at Fort Mitchell, Lunenburg County, Virginia. It is a one-story, four-bay, rectangular frame vernacular building that is approximately 20 feet wide and 48 feet long. It consists of two sections: the rear, freight portion of the depot, built about 1860, of heavy timber, mortise and tenon construction and clad with board and batten siding; and the front passenger portion of the depot built about 1884. The passenger portion consists of two segregated waiting rooms separated by a vertical, beaded board wall. It ceased use as a passenger station in 1956.

It was listed on the National Register of Historic Places in 2009.
