= Willie Ben Jones =

American serial killer

- Born: 1953 (age 72–73); Richmond, Virginia, U.S.
- Status: Released
- Motive: Wanted to "punish" sex workers
- Conviction: Second degree murder (3 counts)
- Penalty: 60 years imprisonment

Details
- Victims: 3–4
- Span of crimes: 1980–1990
- Country: United States
- State: Virginia
- Date apprehended: November 4, 1990
- Imprisoned at: Lunenburg Correctional Center

Willie Ben Jones (born 1953) is an American serial killer who killed at least three sex workers in Richmond, Virginia between 1980 and 1990. During his trial, Jones said he committed the murders since the victims "had to be punished" for being sex workers. He later pleaded guilty to three counts of second degree murder and received three consecutive 20-year sentences.

He was released from prison in 2026.

== Early life ==
Little is known of Jones' background, aside that he was born in 1953 in Richmond. He reportedly suffered from unspecified behavioral and emotional problems as a child, but nonetheless managed to graduate high school and later joined the Coast Guard.

Since the early 1970s, Jones had "a significant history of violent behavior when he has been drinking. Alcohol led to a significant and well-documented series of violence." His alcoholism resulted in assault arrests, seizures, and hostile behavior.

His most notable crime during this period occurred on April 27, 1974, when Jones was engaged in a high-speed chase with two patrol cars after running a red light. When they approached the I-95, one of the officers, H. M. Tyler, attempted to get in front of Jones' car in and stop it, but was instead driven into a guardrail, suffering minor injuries. The remaining officers managed to stop the vehicle and arrest Jones, who fought with the officers before he was finally subdued and transported to the police station.

== Murders ==
=== Confirmed victims ===
On October 6, 1980, Jones picked Ronald A. Jones (no relation), 31, a crossdresser, and took him to his apartment. After realizing Ronald was a man, Jones fatally stabbed him and dumped his body behind the apartment building.

On November 19, 1981, Jones strangled 24-year-old Marinda Zimmerman after she slapped him during an argument. Her nude body was found in an alley on the following day.

On February 28, 1990, he strangled 36-year-old Shirley Marie Jones (no relation), and stuffed her body inside a trunk. On March 10, a neighbor reported a suspicious odor to the police, after which the officers found her body. Initially, police were unable to determine a cause of death, leading to theories that she might have committed suicide or overdosed.

=== Confessed victim ===
Jones later confessed to killing 33-year-old Priscilla Louise Leeper on September 29, 1988, but he was not prosecuted in this case. Her nude body was found in some bushes across from a landfill.

== Arrest, trial, and imprisonment ==
On November 4, 1990, Jones traveled to at least three different police station to confess to his crimes, but his claims were dismissed. He then went to the offices of the FBI in Washington, D.C., where he confessed to the four killings to Agent Patrick Malloy. Several detectives were then dispatched to confirm one of his claims - the murder of Shirley Jones - which they managed to corroborate after an initial unsuccessful attempt to locate her body at the indicated address. After learning about the confession, Richmond police detective Steve Dalton traveled to D.C. to interview him, from which he learned that Jones kept notes about every single one of the murders. A search of his residence then uncovered a briefcase that contained said notes.

While awaiting extradition back to Virginia, authorities investigated him for involvement in any other possible murders, due to the fact that Jones' known crimes were committed years apart. After they were unable to link him to any other unsolved crimes, he was charged with the murders of Ronald Jones, Marida Zimmerman, and Shirley Jones. Charges in the Leeper case were dropped due to the belief that since he had confessed to three violent crimes, he would face a long sentencen and would be ineligible for parole.

During Jones's trial, Richmond Detective Steve A. Dalton quoted him as having killed his victims since "they had to be punished." On March 27, 1991, Jones pleaded guilty to three counts of second degree murder. On May 14, 1991, he received the maximum sentence of 60 years, 20 years for each count of second degree murder.

Under Virginia's three-strikes law, Jones was declared ineligible for discretionary parole since he'd been convicted of three violent separate crimes. However, he became eligible for geriatric parole after turning 60. Jones has been denied early release every time.

Jones served most of his sentence at Lunenburg Correctional Center. He was released from prison on mandatory parole in January 2026.

== See also ==
- List of serial killers in the United States
