= Flat Rock (Kenbridge, Virginia) =

Historic house in Virginia, United States

- U.S. National Register of Historic Places
- Virginia Landmarks Register
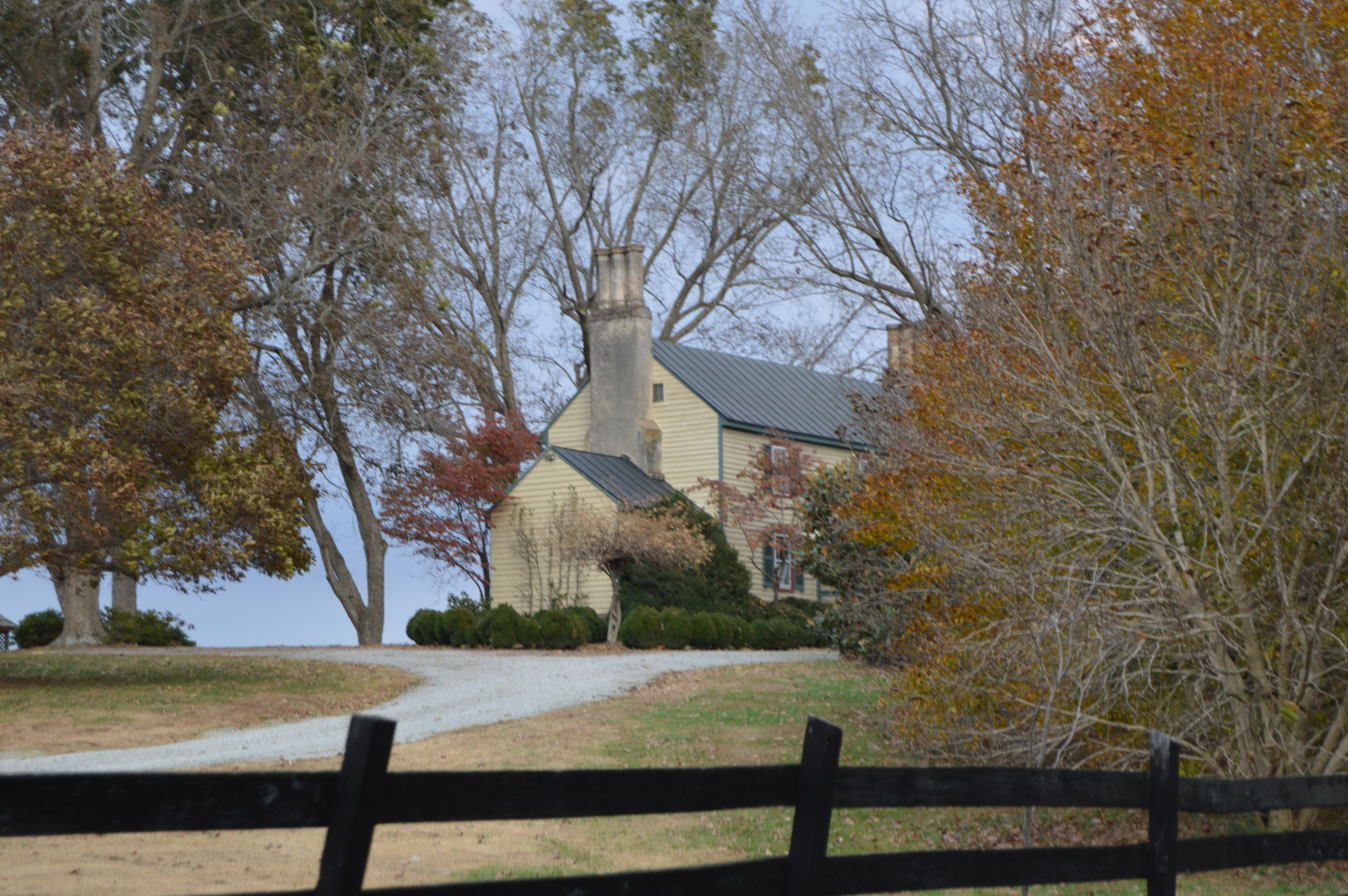
- Roadside view

- Location within Virginia Location within the United States
- Location: SW of Kenbridge on VA 655, near Kenbridge, Virginia
- Coordinates: 36°56′15.5″N 78°8′57″W
- Area: 1 acre (0.40 ha)
- Built: c. 1797
- NRHP reference No.: 79003051
- VLR No.: 055-0003

Significant dates
- Added to NRHP: May 21, 1979
- Designated VLR: December 19, 1978

Flat Rock is a historic plantation house located near Kenbridge, Lunenburg County, Virginia. The house was built in several sections during the first half of the 19th century. It is a two-story, three-bay frame structure flanked by one-story, one-bay wings. The oldest portion likely dates to about 1797. It has a side-gable roof and features two massive exterior end chimneys of brick and granite. Also on the property are the contributing smokehouse and a mid-19th-century monument to Henry H. Chambers (1790–1826), son of an owner of Flat Rock and later a U.S. Senator from Alabama, who is buried here where he died en route to Washington.

It was listed on the National Register of Historic Places in 1979.
