= Fifth Avenue Historic District (Kenbridge, Virginia) =

Historic district in Virginia, United States

- U.S. National Register of Historic Places
- U.S. Historic district
- Virginia Landmarks Register
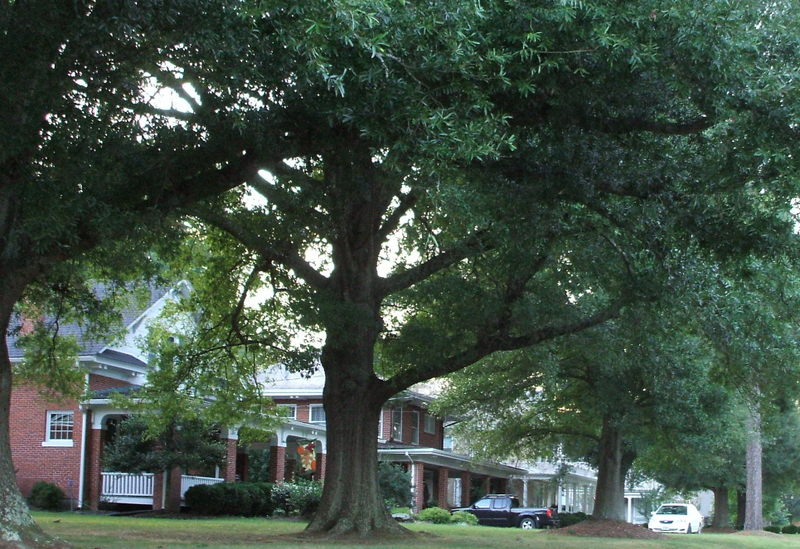

- Location within Virginia Location within the United States
- Location: 100-500 blocks of E. Fifth Ave., Kenbridge, Virginia
- Coordinates: 36°57′35″N 78°16′00″W
- Area: 23 acres (9.3 ha)
- Built: 1908
- Architect: Robinson, Charles Morrison; Huff, Carence Wright Huff, et al
- Architectural style: Queen Anne, Colonial Revival, et al.
- NRHP reference No.: 06000066
- VLR No.: 247-0001

Significant dates
- Added to NRHP: February 22, 2006
- Designated VLR: June 1, 2005

Fifth Avenue Historic District is an American national historic district located at Kenbridge, Lunenburg County, Virginia. It includes 63 contributing buildings in a residential area of the town of Kenbridge. There are 39 primary residences, 16 garages, and eight sheds. The dwellings constructed between 1890 and 1930 represent a variety of architectural styles including Queen Anne, Colonial Revival, and Bungalow. Notable non-residential buildings include the Harris Hospital (c. 1910), Kenbridge Baptist Church (1948), Kenbridge Methodist Church (1914), and Kenbridge High School (1921), designed by noted Richmond architect Charles M. Robinson.

It was listed on the National Register of Historic Places in 2006.
