= Brickland =

Historic house in Virginia, United States

- U.S. National Register of Historic Places
- Virginia Landmarks Register
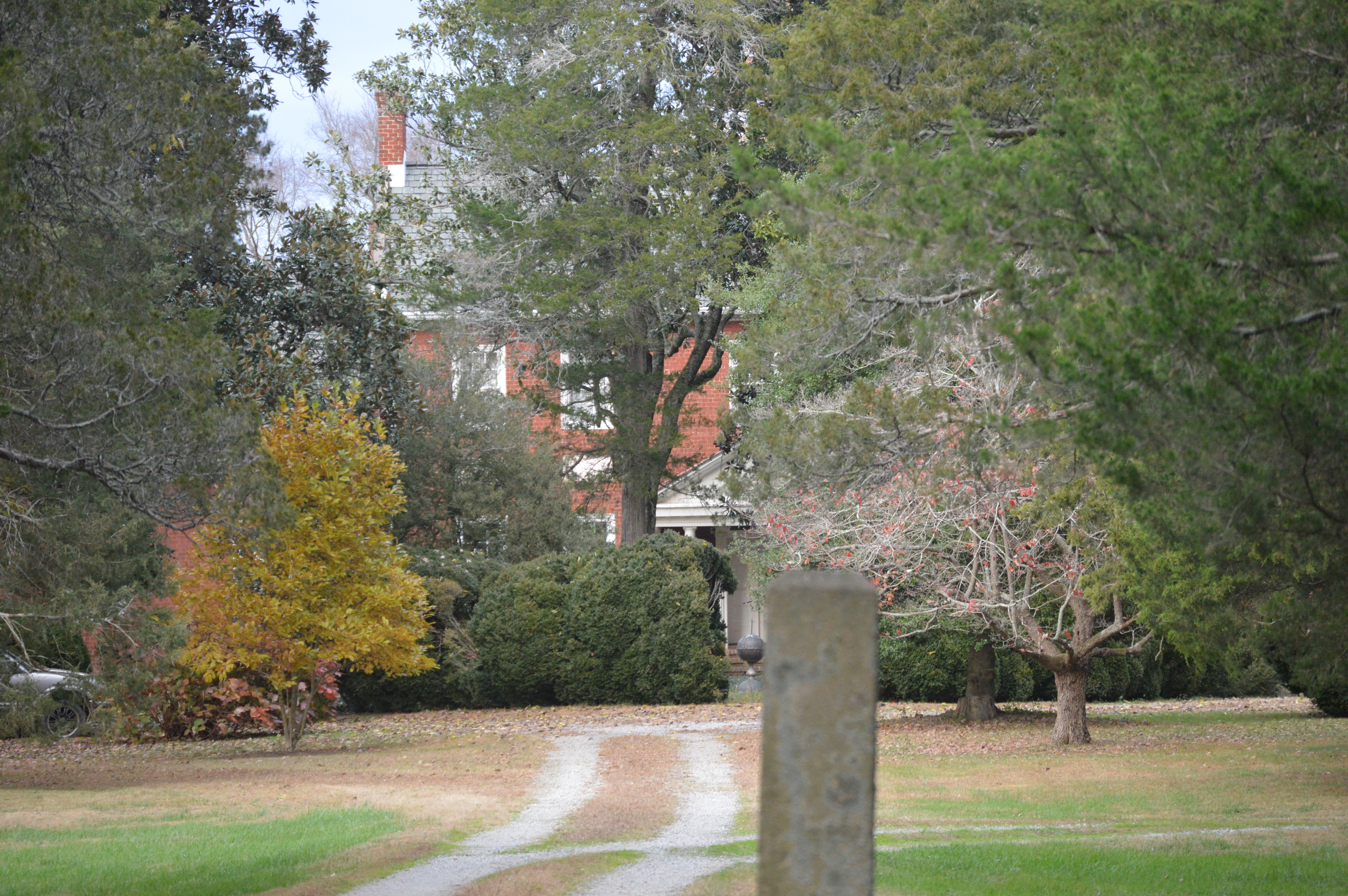
- Roadside view

- Location within Virginia Location within the United States
- Location: 6877 Brickland Rd., Kenbridge, Virginia
- Coordinates: 36°52′53″N 78°05′18″W
- Area: 25 acres (10 ha)
- Built: 1818, c. 1822
- Architectural style: Federal
- NRHP reference No.: 05000524
- VLR No.: 055-0002

Significant dates
- Added to NRHP: June 1, 2005
- Designated VLR: March 16, 2005

Brickland is a historic plantation house located near Kenbridge, Lunenburg County, Virginia. The original section was built about 1818, with an addition built about 1822, and rear addition in 1920. It is a 2 1/2-story, eight-bay, brick dwelling in the Federal style. The front facade features a gable-roof porch with paired Tuscan order columns. Also on the property are the contributing pump house, smokehouse (c. 1820), Lunenburg County's first post office (c. 1900), a summer kitchen (c. 1820), barns, a chicken house, and the ruins of slave quarters and an ice house.

It was listed on the National Register of Historic Places in 2005.
