= Victoria High School (Victoria, Virginia) =

Historic school building in Virginia, US

- U.S. National Register of Historic Places
- Virginia Landmarks Register
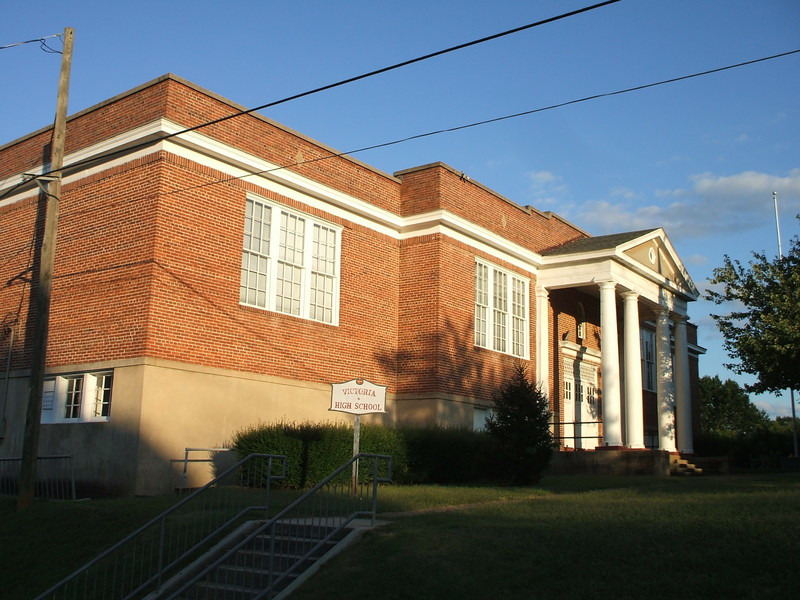
- Victoria High School, September 2013

- Location within Virginia Location within the United States
- Location: Jct. of Eighth St. and Lee Ave., Victoria, Virginia
- Coordinates: 36°59′45″N 78°13′29″W
- Area: less than one acre
- Built: 1922-1923
- Architectural style: Classical Revival
- NRHP reference No.: 95001561
- VLR No.: 317-0012

Significant dates
- Added to NRHP: January 22, 1996
- Designated VLR: October 18, 1995

Victoria High School is a historic high school building located at Victoria, Lunenburg County, Virginia. It was built in 1922–1923, and is a one-story, five-bay, brick building on a raised basement in the Classical Revival style. The front facade features a pedimented portico with round wooden Doric order columns and square pilasters. The portico projects from a pavilion that spans the center three bays of the school's front facade. It was the principal public school building for white students from the date of its construction until it closed in 1966.

It was listed on the National Register of Historic Places in 1996.
