= Bechelbronn =

Historic house in Virginia

- U.S. National Register of Historic Places
- Virginia Landmarks Register
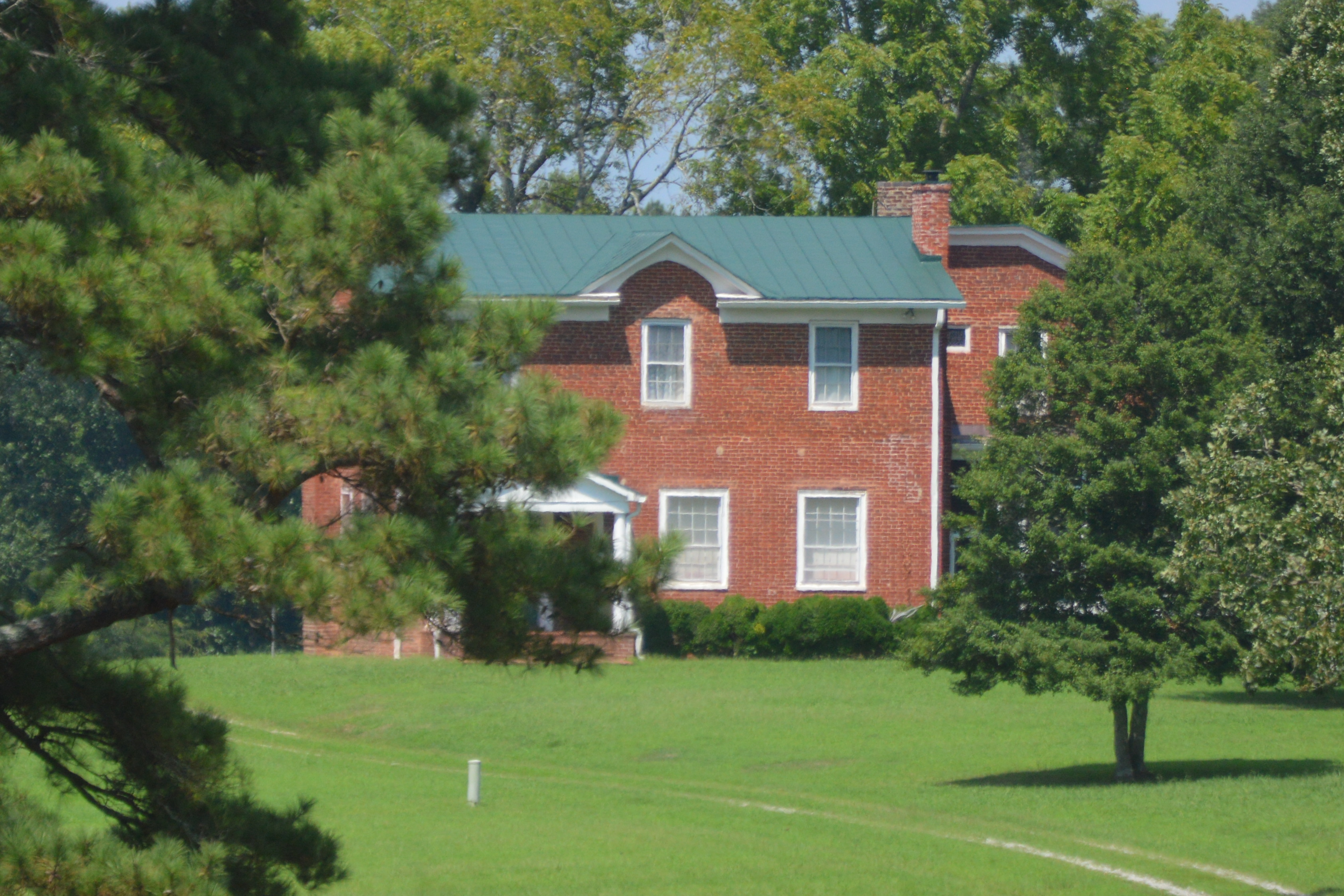
- Distant view from the south

- Location within Virginia Location within the United States
- Location: 1223 Rubermont Rd., north of Victoria, Virginia
- Coordinates: 37°4′3″N 78°10′44″W
- Area: 363.7 acres (147.2 ha)
- Built: c. 1840, c. 1851, c. 1900
- Architectural style: Federal, Greek Revival
- NRHP reference No.: 08000389
- VLR No.: 055-0063

Significant dates
- Added to NRHP: May 8, 2008
- Designated VLR: March 20, 2008

Bechelbronn is a historic home located near Victoria, Lunenburg County, Virginia. The original house was built about 1840, with additions made about 1851, and about 1900. It is a rambling two-story brick dwelling with vernacular Federal- and Greek Revival-style details. Also on the property is the contributing Perry family cemetery.

It was listed on the National Register of Historic Places in 2008.
