= Scoop (utensil) =

Type of spoon

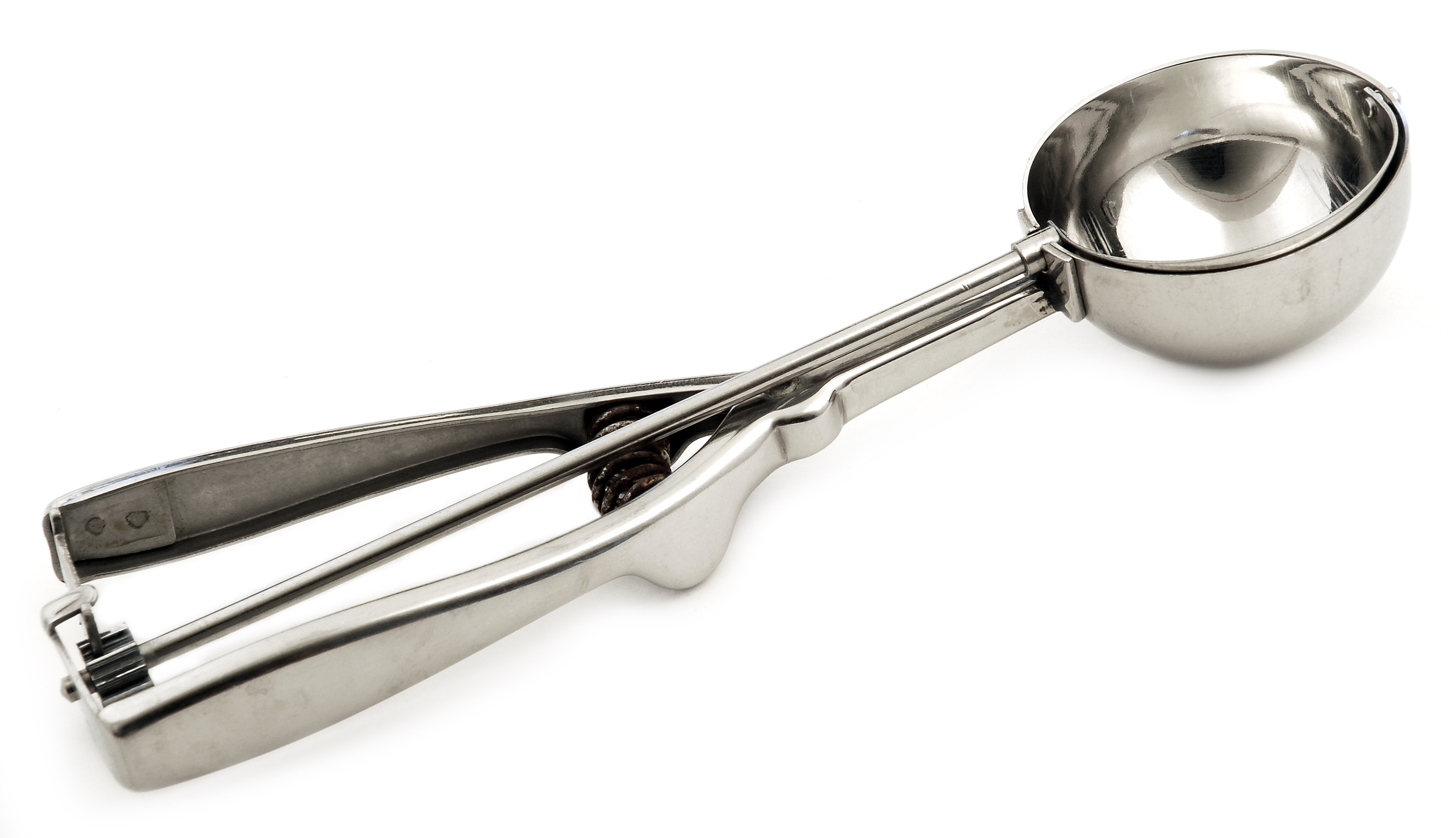
Disher style scoop

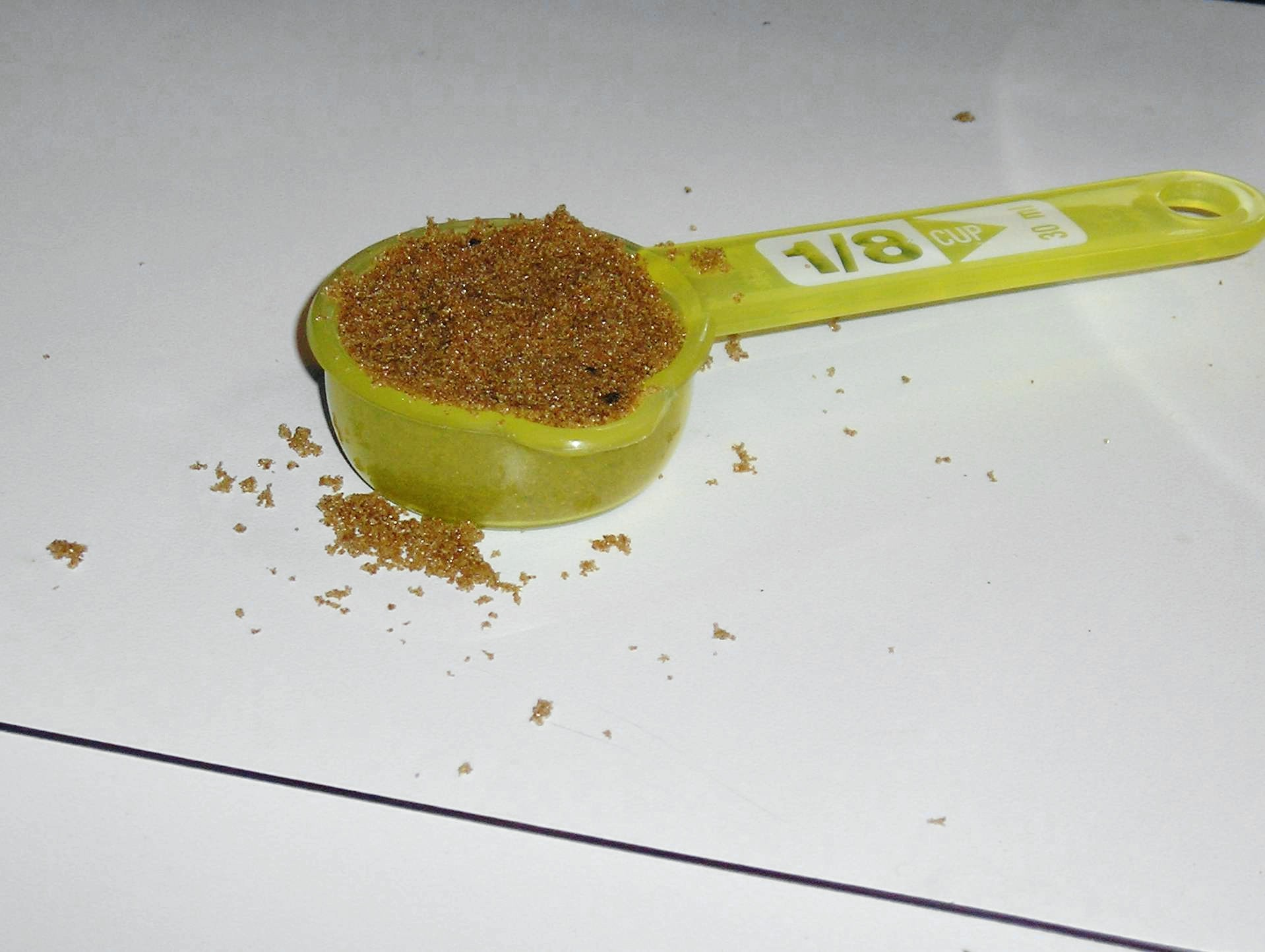
A measuring scoop

In common usage, a scoop is any specialized spoon used to serve food.

== Terminology ==
In the technical terms used by the food service industry and in the retail and wholesale food utensil industries, there is a clear distinction among three types of scoop: the disher, which is used to measure a portion (such as cookie dough), to make melon balls, and often to serve ice cream (although some manufacturers frequently advise against using dishers for ice cream and other frozen foods); the ice cream scoop; and the transfer scoop which is used to measure or to transfer an unspecified amount of a bulk dry foodstuff such as rice, flour, or sugar.

Dishers are usually hemispherical like an ice cream scoop, while measuring scoops are usually cylindrical, and transfer scoops are usually shovel-shaped.

== Disher ==
Some dishers have mechanical levers which help release the tool's contents. Traditional dishers are sized by volume either by the number of scoops per quart, or by its volume in fluid ounces or tablespoons, or the diameter of the tool's bowl.

=== Standard sizes ===
The table below is the standard definition in the US food industry, but actual capacity varies by manufacturer.

Handle color	Scoops per quart	Typical use	US fluid ounces	US tablespoon	US cup	Milliliters	Diameter (inches)
Orange	4		8.0	16	1	236.6	3 5/8
Teal	5		6.4	12 4/5	4/5	189.3	3 3/8
White	6		5.3	10 2/3	2/3	158	3
Gray	8	Ice cream, jumbo cupcakes, mashed potatoes	4.0	8	1/2	118	2 3/4
Ivory	10	Texas-size muffins, popovers	3.2	6 2/5	2/5	95	2 5/8
Green	12	Ice cream, standard muffins	2.7	5 1/3	1/3	80	2 3/8 or 2 1/2
Sky Blue	14		2.4	4 4/5	3/10	71	2 3/8
Royal Blue	16	Pancakes	2.0	4	1/4	59	2 5/16
Yellow	20	Ice cream, giant cookies	1.6	3 1/5	1/5	47	2 1/8
Red	24	Regular cupcakes, sorbet, mashed potatoes	1.3	2 2/3	1/6	38	2
Black	30	Silver-dollar pancakes, candies	1.1	2 1/8	17/128	33	1 7/8
Mushroom	36		0.94	1 22/25	47/400	27.8	1 3/4
Orchid	40	Mini muffins	0.8	1 1/2	3/32	24	1 5/8
Rust	50	Mini cupcakes, canapés	0.64	1 7/25	2/25	19	
Pink	60	Large cookies	0.53	6/15	1/15	16	
Plum	70	Cookies	0.46	11/12	11/192	14	1 1/4
Orange	100	Chocolate truffles	0.32	17/27	17/432	9	

== Ice cream scoop ==
Some designs have a moveable mechanism to help release the ice cream from the scoop, while other designs rely more on keeping the scoop warm enough to partially melt the frozen dessert. Some ice cream scoops have a thermally conductive liquid in the handle to help keep the ice cream from freezing to the scoop's metal.

=== History ===
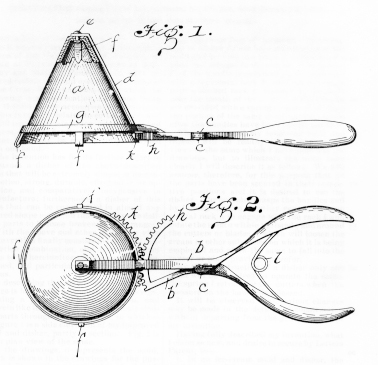
"Ice Cream Mold and Disher" patent drawing

Alfred L. Cralle, a porter in a drug store and at a hotel in Pittsburgh, Pennsylvania, noticed that servers at the hotel had trouble with ice cream sticking to serving spoons, and he developed an ice cream scoop. On June 10, 1896, Cralle applied for a patent on his invention. He was awarded patent 576,395 on February 2, 1897. The patented "Ice Cream Mold and Disher" was an ice cream scoop with a built-in scraper to allow for one-handed operation. Cralle's functional design is reflected in modern ice cream scoops.

== Transfer scoop ==
Transfer scoops (a.k.a. utility scoops) are used to transfer bulk foods from large storage containers to smaller containers, and generally do not have any measurement markings, as their purpose is to transfer efficiently, and taking time to adjust the amount in a scoop would slow the transfer rate.

An ice cream spade is a sturdy spade-shaped large shallow spoon, used to transfer large amounts of hard frozen ice cream, stiff frozen desserts, or some other stiff food paste. It is also well-shaped to scrape the insides of ice cream containers and tubs.

== Other types ==
- Ice scoop
- Coffee scoop
- Spooner
- Dipper
- French fry scoop
- Cheese scoop

== Gallery ==
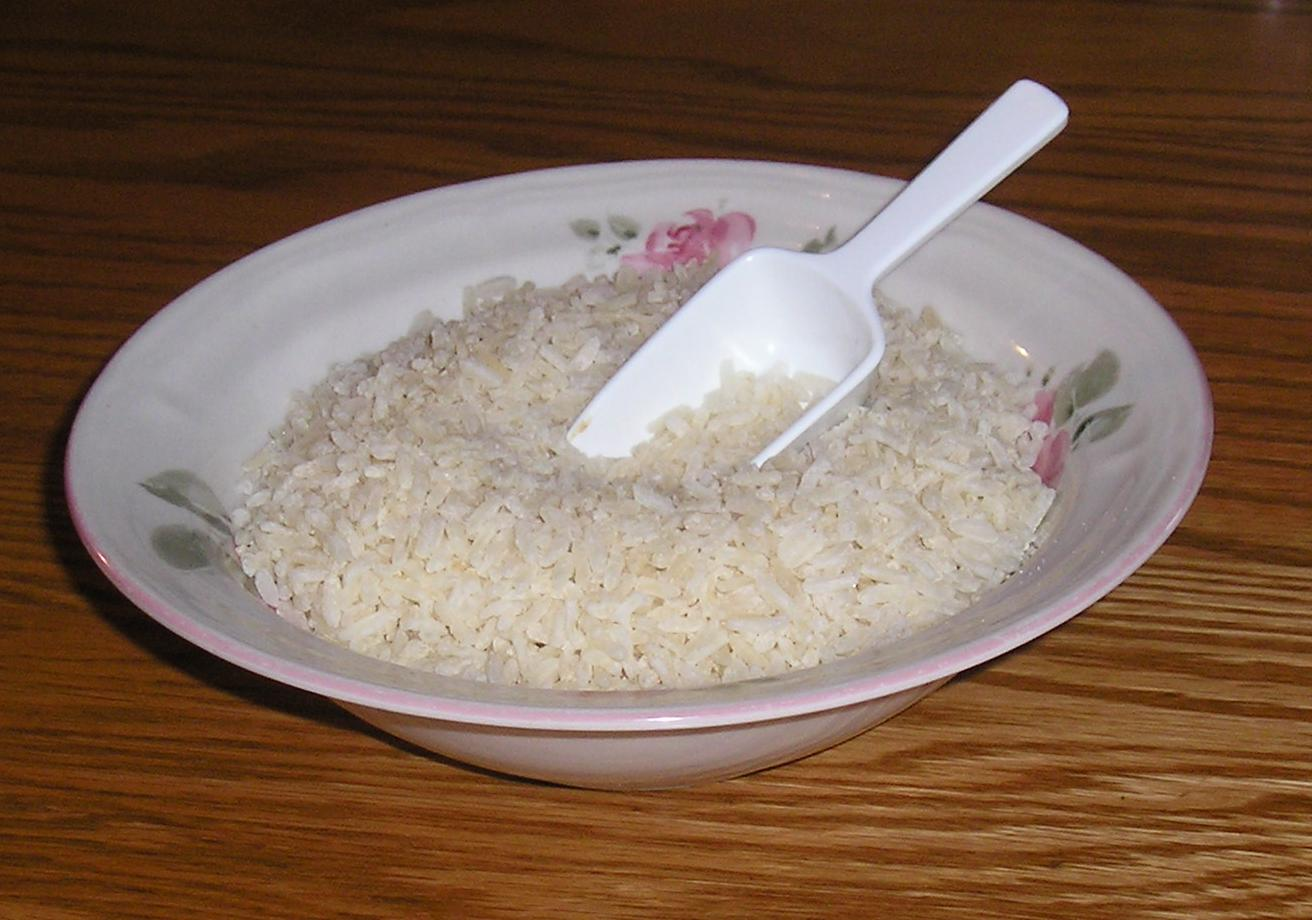
Transfer scoop

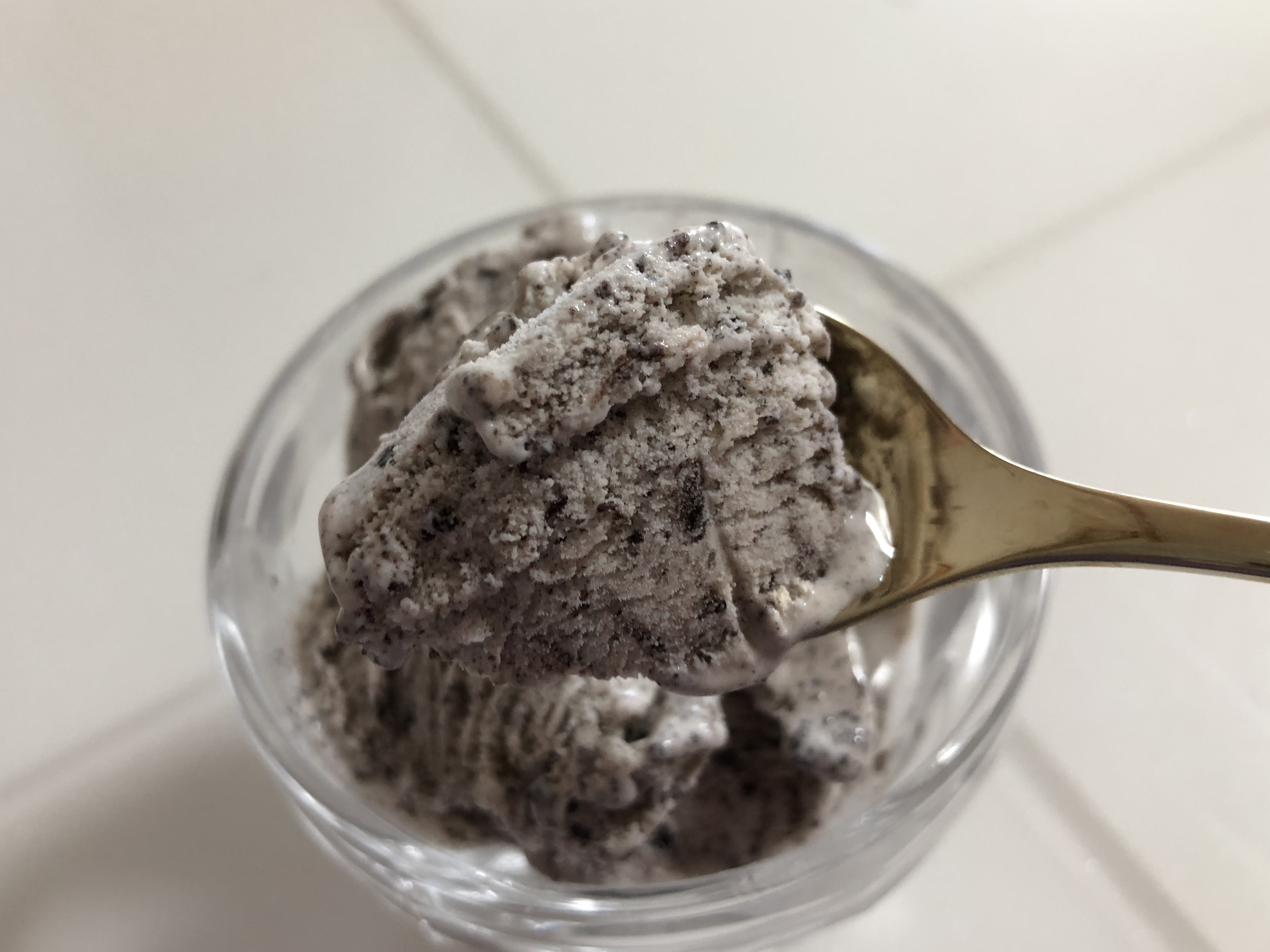
Ice cream spade in use

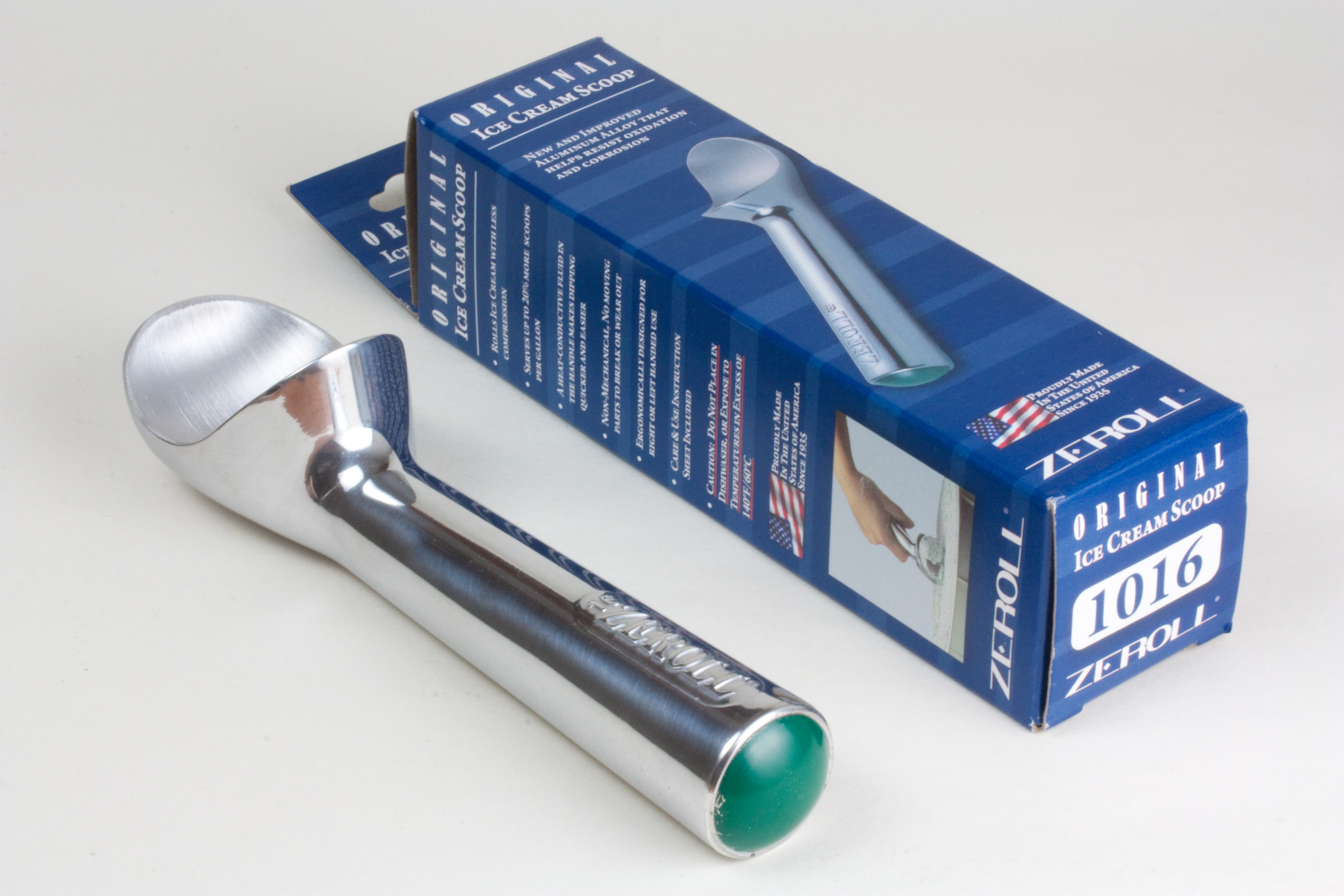
Zeroll ice cream scoop with heat conductive fluid and green handle cap, indicating a #16 scoop (Zeroll scoops use a non-standard color coding, where the size # is the number of double scoop servings in a gallon)

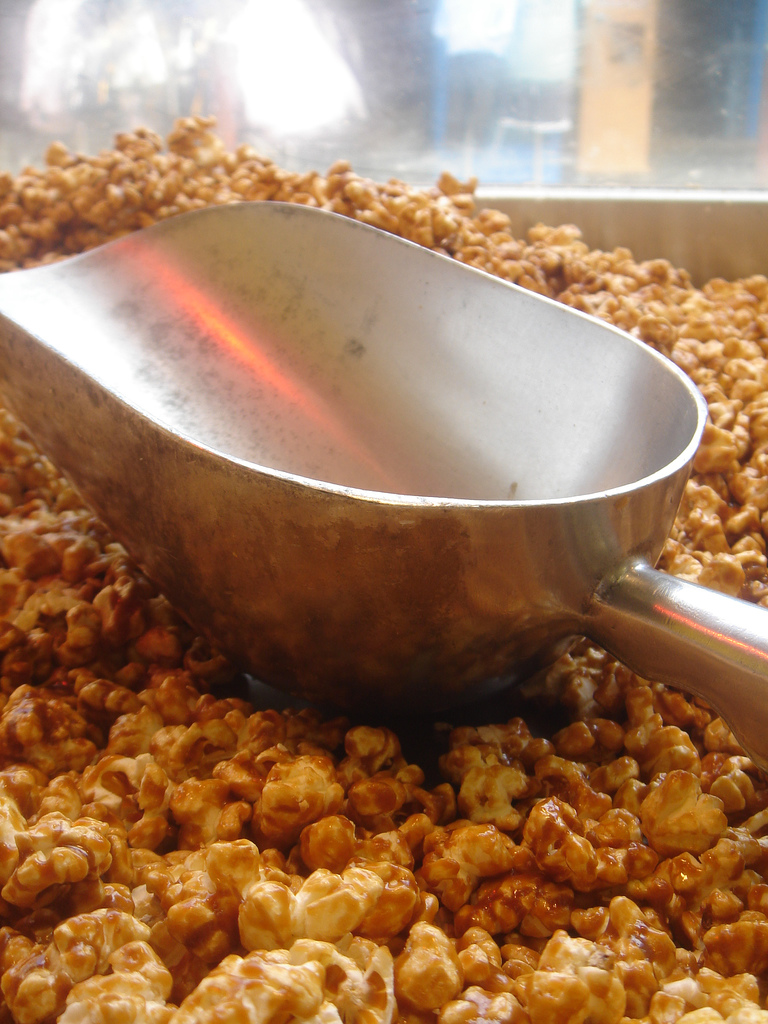
Large aluminum scoop, here with caramel corn

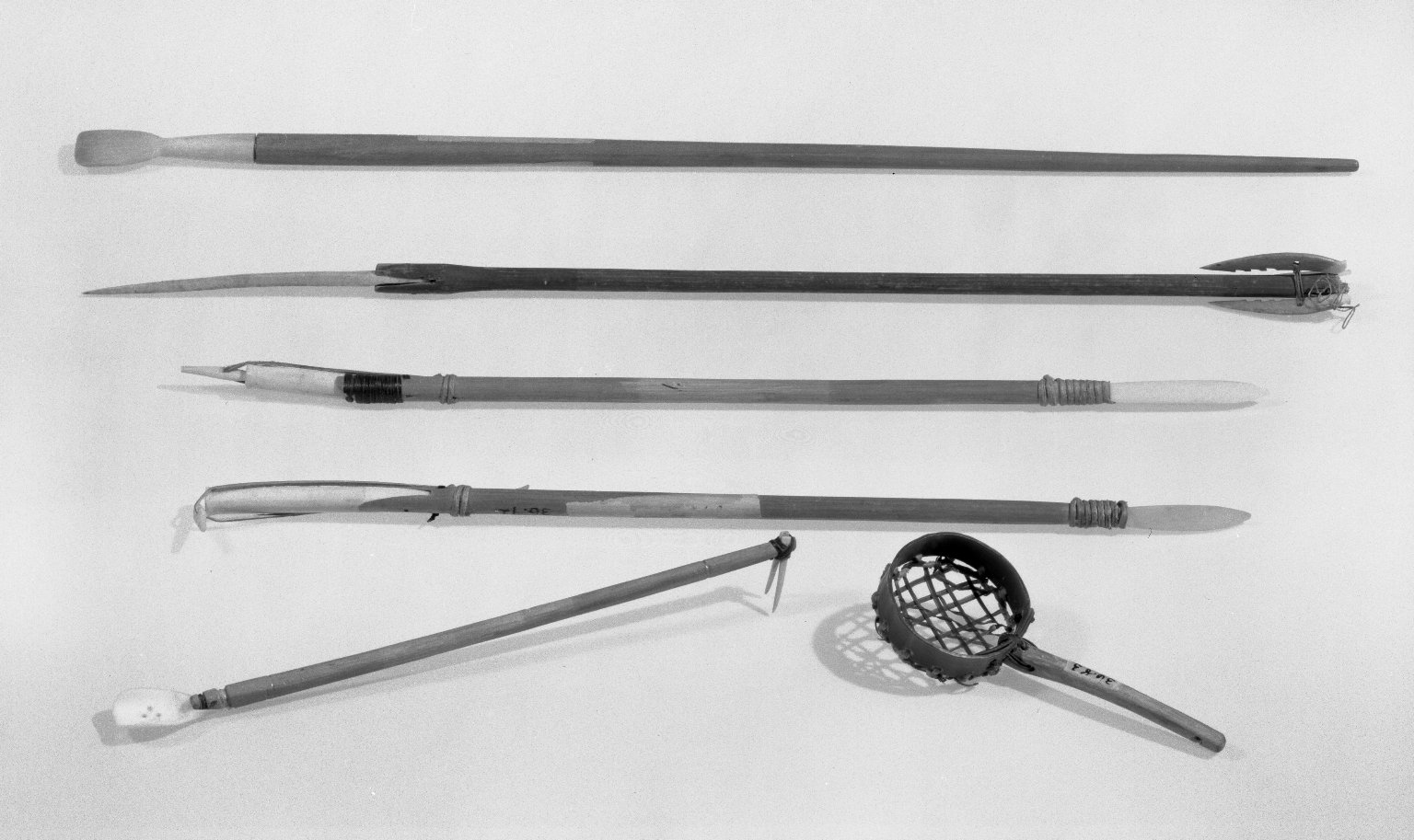
Model of an Ice Scoop, Eskimo, 1900–1930, Brooklyn Museum

== See also ==
- Ladle
