= Alfred L. Cralle =

American inventor (1866–1919)

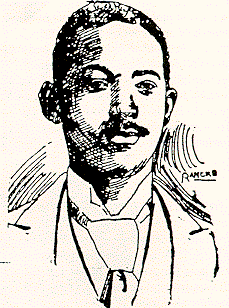
- Born: September 4, 1866; Kenbridge, Virginia, U.S.
- Died: May 6, 1919 (aged 52); Pittsburgh, Pennsylvania, U.S.
- Education: Wayland Seminary
- Occupations: Businessman, inventor
- Known for: Inventing the ice cream scooper
- Spouse: Elizabeth Cralle (m. 1900)
- Children: 3

Alfred L. Cralle (September 4, 1866 – May 6, 1919) was an American businessman and inventor, best known for inventing the "Ice Cream scooper".

== Biography ==
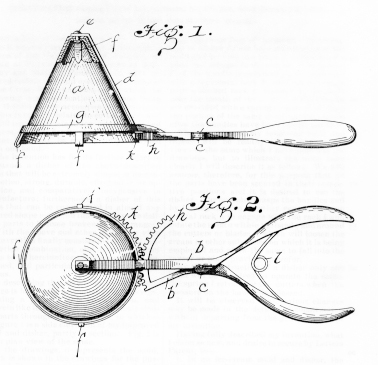
Ice Cream Mold and Disher

Alfred L. Cralle, who was African American, was born in Kenbridge, Lunenburg County, Virginia, in 1866, just after the end of the American Civil War. He attended local schools and worked with his father in the carpentry trade as a young man, becoming interested in mechanics. He was sent to Washington, D.C., where he attended Wayland Seminary, one of a number of schools founded by the American Baptist Home Mission Society to help educate African Americans after the Civil War.

He then settled in Pittsburgh, Pennsylvania, where he first served as a porter in a drug store and at a hotel. Alfred noticed that servers at the hotel had trouble with ice cream sticking to serving spoons, and he developed an ice cream scoop.

On June 10, 1896, Cralle applied for a patent on his invention. He was awarded patent 576,395 on 2 February 1897. The patented "Ice Cream Mold and Disher," was an ice cream scoop with a built-in scraper to allow for one-handed operation. Alfred's functional design is reflected in modern ice cream scoops.

He later become a general manager for the Afro-American Financial, Accumulating, Merchandise and Business association.

On September 20, 1900, he married Elizabeth Cralle, with whom he had three children.

Cralle died from a car wreck on May 6, 1919, in Pittsburgh, Pennsylvania.
