= Levi Silliman Ives =

American theologian and Episcopal bishop

The Right Reverend Levi Silliman Ives S.T.D., LL.D.
- Bishop of North Carolina
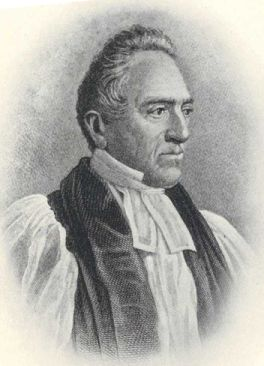
- Church: Roman Catholic prev. Episcopal Church
- Diocese: North Carolina
- Elected: May 21, 1831
- In office: 1831–1852
- Predecessor: John Stark Ravenscroft
- Successor: Thomas Atkinson

Orders
- Ordination: December 14, 1823 by William White
- Consecration: September 22, 1831 by William White
- Laicized: October 14, 1853

Personal details
- Born: September 16, 1797 Meriden, Connecticut, United States
- Died: October 13, 1867 (aged 70) Manhattanville, New York, United States
- Buried: Saint Raymond's Cemetery (Bronx)
- Denomination: Roman Catholic
- Parents: Levi Ives & Fanny Silliman
- Spouse: Rebecca Hobart

Levi Silliman Ives (September 16, 1797 – October 13, 1867) was an American Catholic theologian. Formerly a Protestant, he served as the Episcopal Bishop of North Carolina from 1831 until 1852, when he converted to Catholicism. Ives subsequently became a noted professor at colleges in the New York area. He was the founder and first president of the New York Catholic Protectory, an institution for the shelter and education of destitute and abandoned children. He was also a founder of Manhattan College.

== Early life ==
Levi was born at Meriden, Connecticut on September 16, 1797, the son of Levi and Fanny Silliman Ives. He was brought up on his father's farm in Turin, New York. Levi served during the first year of the War of 1812 and studied at Hamilton College, but in 1819 left the Presbyterian for the Episcopal Church, and studied under Bishop John Henry Hobart and was graduated from the General Theological Seminary in New York City. In 1822, he married Bishop Hobart's daughter, Rebecca. That year he was ordained a deacon by Bishop Hobart. Like his father-in-law, Ives was a supporter of the High Church wing of the Episcopal church. In 1823 he was ordained a priest in Philadelphia by Bishop William White.

== Episcopal Church career ==
Ives was rector of Trinity Church, Southwark, Philadelphia, Pennsylvania, from 1823 to 1827; later he served as assistant minister at Trinity Church, New York, and as rector at St. James Church, Lancaster, Pennsylvania, until 1831.

After the unexpected death of the Right Reverend John Stark Ravenscroft in 1830, Ives was elected bishop of North Carolina on May 21, 1831. He was the 25th bishop of the ECUSA, and was consecrated by bishops William White, Henry Ustick Onderdonk, and Benjamin Treadwell Onderdonk. For many years Ives's views and those of the lay delegates of the diocese coincided. As a bishop Ives took great interest in the education and religious training of the black community.

Having become deeply attracted to the Oxford Movement while studying Church history, Ives founded a religious community called the Brotherhood of the Holy Cross at Valle Crucis, North Carolina. Its members (a few clergymen and zealous laymen) observed a community rule and preached Tractarian ideas. Ives was sympathetic to the idea that a number of Anglican practices, rituals, and theological ideas had been too hastily been discarded during the English Reformation. These views were not shared by members of the Low Church party who felt that it tended to obscure the differences between Anglicanism and Catholicism. So enthusiastic was the brotherhood for Tractarian theories that in 1848, Ives was arraigned before the convention of the Episcopal Church. His explanations were accepted for a time, but the "Brotherhood of the Holy Cross" was dissolved.

== Conversion to Catholicism ==
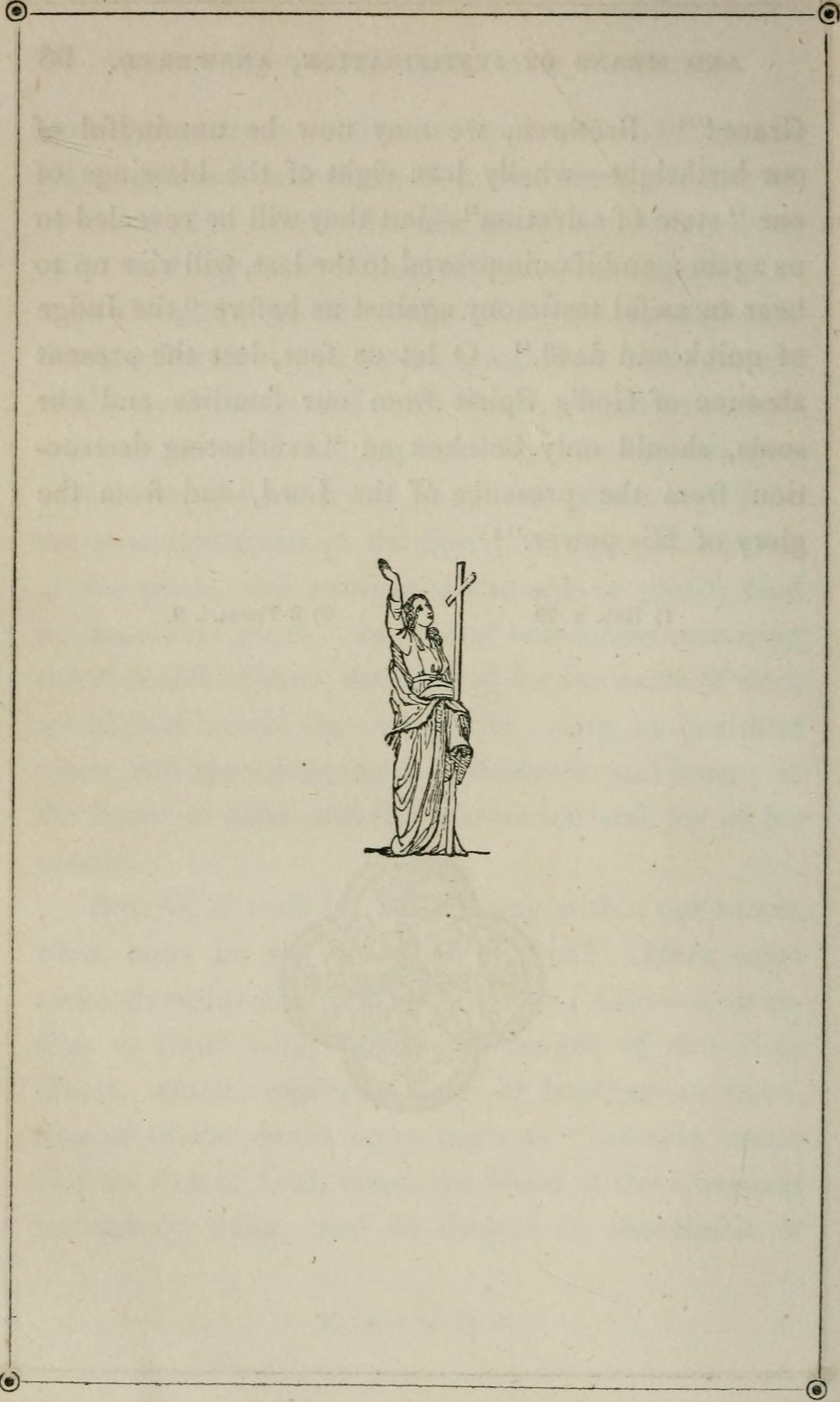
"The apostles doctrine and fellowship." Five sermons preached in the principal churches of his diocese, during his spring visitation, 1844

Despite these concessions, Ives's theological convictions continued to evolve until he was no longer able to accept that his denomination was a branch of the true Catholic church. "But in a time of rabid, irrational anti-Catholicism, Ives's espousal of a more inclusive and flexible historical catholicism within Anglicanism received a suspicious and horrified hearing."

In 1852, after obtaining a six-month leave of absence, the 55-year-old cleric left for Europe with his wife. They went to Rome, where, on December 22, 1852, he sent a letter to the convention of the Protestant Episcopal Church in North Carolina resigning his office of Bishop of North Carolina in view of his decision to join the Catholic Church. Ives was the first Anglican bishop since John Clement Gordon, Bishop of Galloway in the Scottish Episcopal Church, to convert to Catholicism. Signalling his prominence, it was Pope Pius IX who received him on December 26, 1852. Some months later, his wife also converted to Catholicism.

In 1854, Ives published his apologia, The Trials of a Mind in its Progress to Catholicism. The book was met with at least one extensive, critical review by an anonymous ex-clergyman.

After two years in Rome, the Iveses returned to New York. As a lay Catholic, whose marriage barred him from the priesthood, Ives spent his last years as a professor of rhetoric at St. John's College (now Fordham University). He also lectured at St. Joseph's Seminary and the convents of the Sacred Heart and Sisters of Charity, as well as concerning himself in charity work. He was also one of the founders of Manhattan College (a Catholic college now located in Riverdale, New York) and served as the first chairman of its board of trustees (1863-1867).

He died at his home in Manhattanville, New York on October 13, 1867.

== Work in the New York Catholic Protectory ==
Ives was a moving force behind the establishment in 1863 of "The Society for the Protection of Destitute Catholic Children in the City of New York", which founded the New York Catholic Protectory, an institution for the shelter and training of the young, designed to afford neglected or abandoned children shelter, food, raiment and the rudiments of an education in religion, morals, science and manual training or industrial pursuits. Ives and his supporters established the Protectory after an unsuccessful attempt to create a Catholic placing out agency to rival Charles Loring Brace's Protestant-run Children's Aid Society (CAS). The Protectory accepted more children than most other institutions, and primarily catered to minors under age fourteen committed either by their parents, by juvenile court judges, or the city's poor officials.

== Sources ==
- Batterson, Hermon Griswold (1878). A Sketch-book of the American Episcopate. Philadelphia: J.B. Lippencott & Co – via Internet Archive.

Episcopal Church (USA) titles
Preceded by John Stark Ravenscroft	2nd Bishop of North Carolina; 1831–1852	Succeeded by Thomas Atkinson
