= A Murder in Virginia =

A Murder in Virginia: Southern Justice on Trial
- Author: Suzanne Lebsock
- Cover artist: Chin-Yee Lai
- Language: English
- Publisher: W. W. Norton
- Publication date: 2003
- Publication place: United States
- Pages: 442
- ISBN: 0-393-32606-3
- OCLC: 57213559

A Murder in Virginia: Southern Justice on Trial is a book by Suzanne Lebsock detailing the cases surrounding the murder of Lucy Pollard in 1895 in Lunenburg County, Virginia.

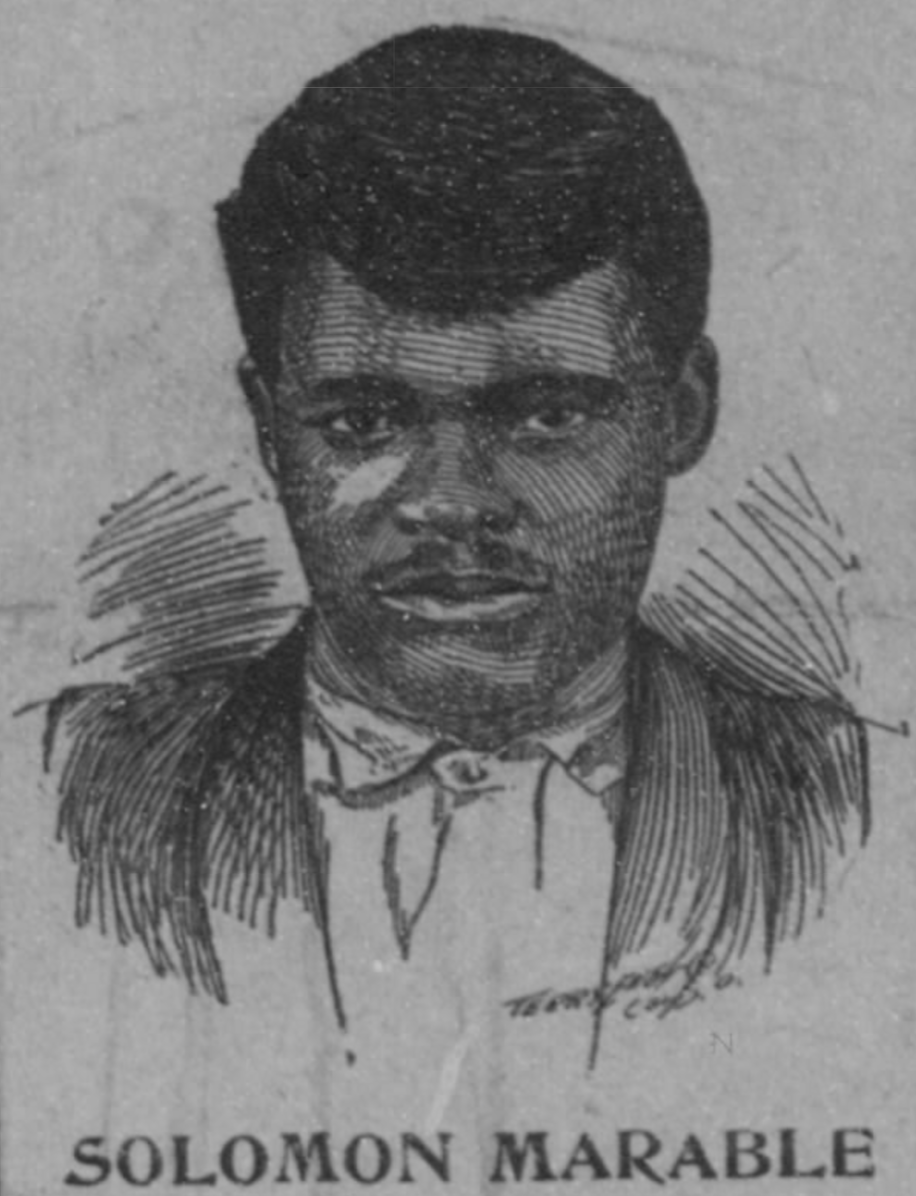
Sketch of Marable in 1895

It won the 2004 Parkman Prize. Published in 2003, it is the story of three African-American women and a man, Solomon Marable, who in 1895 were accused of ax-murdering a white woman.
