= Suzanne Lebsock =

American author and historian (born 1949)

Suzanne Lebsock (born December 1, 1949, at Williston, ND) is an American author and historian. Her works include her first book The Free Women of Petersburg: Status and Culture in a Southern Town, 1784-1860 which was published in 1984 and won the Bancroft Prize, and A Murder in Virginia: Southern Justice on Trial. She has won the Francis Parkman Prize for her writing, and as of 2010 is a Board of Governors Professor of History at Rutgers University in New Brunswick, New Jersey. She specializes in women's history.

Lebsock has held fellowships from the John Simon Guggenheim Memorial and MacArthur foundations.

== Personal life ==
Lebsock was formerly married to Richard Levis McCormick, a former president of Rutgers University. They have two children, Betsy and Michael.

== Published works ==
- A Murder in Virginia: Southern Justice on Trial
- Visible Women: New Essays on American Activism (Women in American History) [with Nancy A Hewitt]
- The Free Women of Petersburg: Status and Culture in a Southern Town, 1784–1860
- A Share of Honor: Virginia Women, 1600-1945. [with Kym Rice]
- Woman Suffrage and White Supremacy: A Virginia Case Study
