= Victoria, Virginia =

- Town
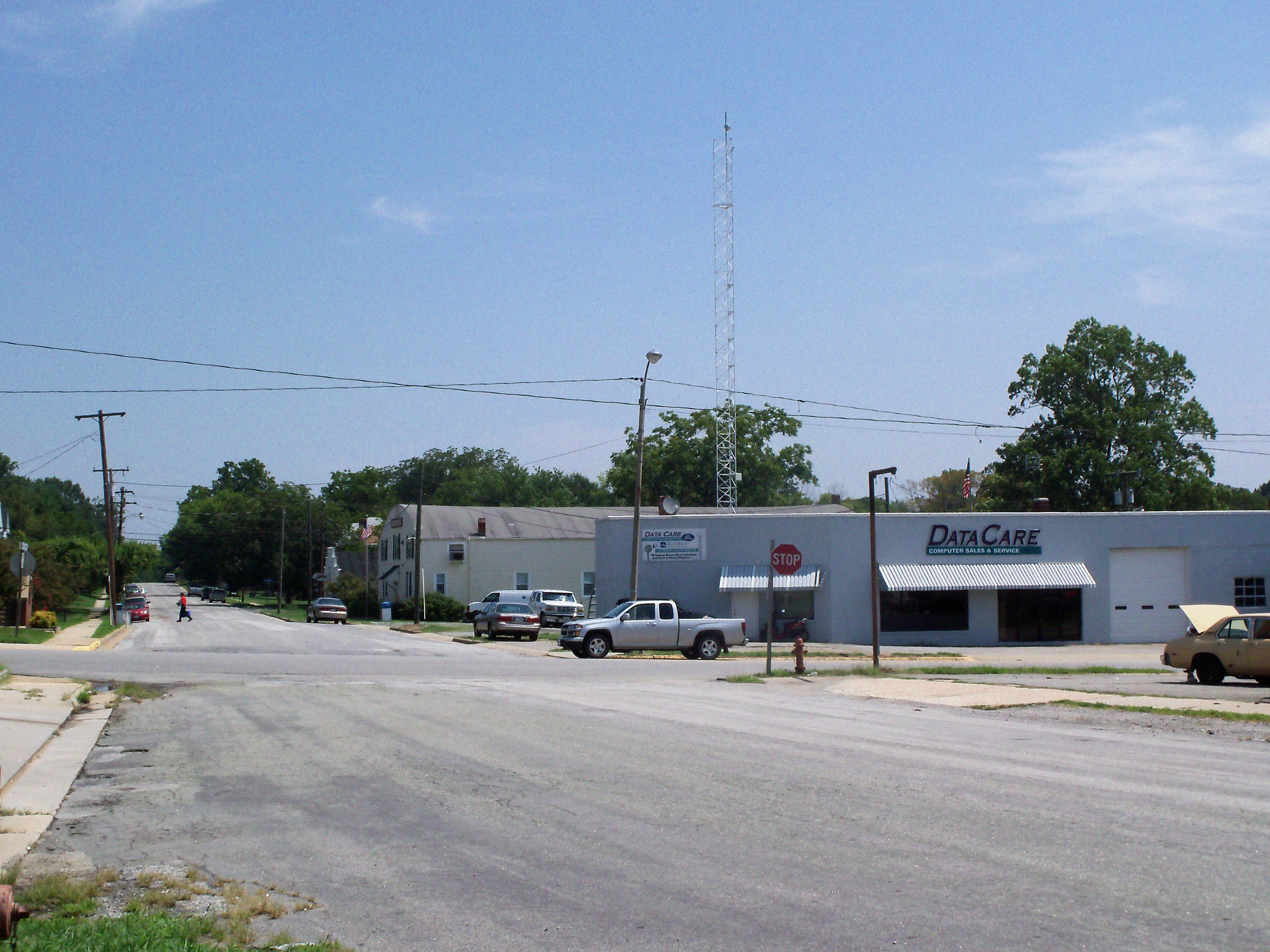
- Street scene in Victoria

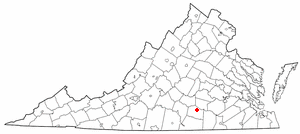
- Location of Victoria, Virginia
- Coordinates: 36°59′36″N 78°13′30″W
- Country: United States
- State: Virginia
- County: Lunenburg
- Named for: Queen Victoria

Government
  - Mayor: Allen D. Smith (Since 2020)
  - Town Manager: Rodney Newton

Area
  - Total: 2.85 sq mi (7.38 km^{2})
  - Land: 2.81 sq mi (7.29 km^{2})
  - Water: 0.035 sq mi (0.09 km^{2})
- Elevation: 587 ft (179 m)

Population (2010)
  - Total: 1,734
  - Estimate (2019): 1,626
  - Density: 577.4/sq mi (222.92/km^{2})
- Time zone: UTC−5 (Eastern (EST))
  - Summer (DST): UTC−4 (EDT)
- ZIP code: 23974
- Area code: 434
- FIPS code: 51-81024
- GNIS feature ID: 1496356
- Website: www.victoriava.net

Victoria is an incorporated town in Lunenburg County, Virginia, United States. As of the 2020 census, Victoria had a population of 1,734.

== History ==
Lunenburg County in the Southside region was established on May 1, 1746, in Great Britain's Virginia Colony from Brunswick County. The county is named for the former Duchy of Brunswick-Lunenburg in Germany, because one of the titles also carried by Britain's Hanoverian kings was Duke of Brunswick-Lunenburg. This area was historically inhabited by Eastern Siouan-speaking peoples. Specifically, groups related to the Saponi (or closely linked regional Siouan-speaking communities like the Occaneechi and Tutelo) used and lived in this Piedmont territory before European colonization and subsequent forced displacement.

After statehood, Virginia grew as part of the original 13 United States. Beginning in 1816, the Virginia Board of Public Works began providing engineering and financial assistance to internal improvements around the state in transportation which continued during most of the 19th century. However, Lunenburg County had been largely passed by as canals, turnpikes, and railroads were built across much of Virginia. At the beginning of the 20th century, the area which was to become Victoria was mostly farmland (primarily cultivating tobacco) and woodlands.

=== Born as a railroad town ===
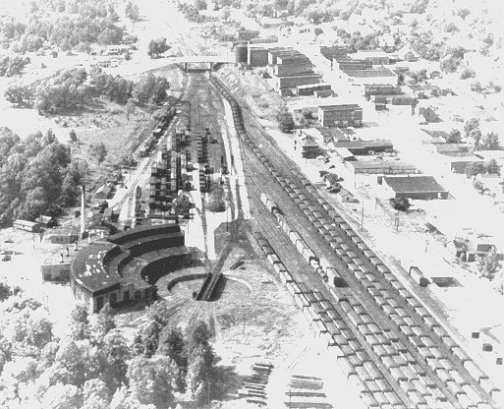
This aerial shot of Victoria was taken in 1954 looking west. It shows the turntable and roundhouse in the lower left, and the passenger station and Norfolk division offices to the right of the tracks

Victoria was founded in 1906 as a planned community on what had been largely undeveloped land during the construction of the Tidewater Railway. This was a new east–west railroad chartered in 1904 with its right of way quietly secured in 1904 and 1905, so as to not alert the competition regarding plans to transport coal originated by its sister Deepwater Railway operating in southern West Virginia. The Tidewater Railway was chartered to cross Virginia from the West Virginia border near Glen Lyn, Virginia in Giles County by way of Roanoke and Suffolk to port at Sewell's Point on Hampton Roads near Norfolk, Virginia. Both railroads were planned and built by the team of mining manager and civil engineer William Nelson Page and industrialist and financier Henry Huttleston Rogers, and added a third Hampton Roads coal exporting railhead to the existing Chesapeake and Ohio Railway (with coal piers at Newport News) and the Norfolk and Western Railway's similar facilities at Norfolk's Lambert's Point.

Queen Victoria of the United Kingdom was a favorite of Henry Rogers, and the new town was named in her honor. Victoria was the midpoint of the VGN's Norfolk Division, which extended from Sewell's Point to Roanoke. Designated to be a "division point" on the railroad (specifically a location for crew changes and servicing of the steam locomotives), Victoria became the location of a large equipment maintenance operation with roundhouse, turntable, coaling and water facilities for servicing steam locomotives, and a large yard.

According to author H. Reid in his 1961 book The Virginian Railway, investors recalled the rapid growth of Roanoke between 1882 and 1884, which had been nicknamed the "Magic City" when the Norfolk and Western (N&W) had established major facilities at the former bucolic location which had been earlier known as Big Lick. Comparisons were made when speculating about Victoria's future potential. They could also look to nearby Crewe on the N&W (about 20 miles away from Victoria) to see what a substantial volume of activity and employment a division point on a steam railroad could bring. Predictably, land sales at Victoria were brisk, and buildings (and jobs) soon followed.

In 1907, as they began nearing completion, the Tidewater and Deepwater Railways were combined to form the Virginian Railway (VGN). In March, the Tidewater Railway was formally rechartered by the Virginia State Corporation Commission as "The Virginian Railway Company" and William Nelson Page was elected president on April 15, 1907, at the first new board meeting in Norfolk. On April 22, the Deepwater Railway was acquired, formalizing the marriage of the two roads. Passenger service from Victoria to Norfolk began on June 17, 1907. The trip from Victoria took 12 hours, and operated once daily in each direction except Sundays, according to the first schedules published in the Norfolk Virginian-Pilot newspaper.

That first summer and fall, in conjunction with the Norfolk and Southern Railway (a regional predecessor of the 21st century Norfolk Southern System), service was offered to the Jamestown Exposition being held in Norfolk County that same summer. At the Exposition, VGN president Page served as Chief of International Jury of Awards, Mines and Metallurgy. United States President Theodore Roosevelt, attending the Jamestown Exposition, was one of the VGN's earliest passengers, according to author Reid.

Adjacent to the Jamestown Exposition site on Hampton Roads at Sewell's Point, a new coal pier was being built. Completion of the entire railroad took 2 additional years. The low gradient VGN was considered an engineering marvel of the time when it was completed in 1909. Soon, coal and other commodities began rolling through Victoria. The new Norfolk Division offices of the railroad were on located on a second floor which was added to the original Victoria passenger station a short time later.

The Virginia General Assembly granted a charter and incorporated the Town of Victoria on March 11, 1916.

Bechelbronn and Victoria High School are listed on the National Register of Historic Places.

=== End of steam, mergers, abandonment ===
Victoria's importance as a rail point declined sharply in the 1950s when the change to diesel-electric locomotives greatly reduced the labor and facilities needed. The last Virginian passenger train served Victoria in January 1956. VGN steam operations ended completely in June 1957. Then, on December 1, 1959, the Virginian Railway merged with the larger Norfolk and Western Railway. Under combined operations, the through coal traffic was shifted from Victoria to the bigger road's main line through Crewe, Virginia, within commuting distance for N&W's Victoria-based employees. Local customers on the former VGN line through Victoria and nearby Kenbridge were few, and the portion of the line through Victoria and Kenbridge was eventually abandoned in the 1980s. All tracks and virtually all structures were removed, and a portion of the land donated to the community by N&W.

Much like many other communities all across the United States, the end of steam railroading and the era of mergers and consolidation in the second half of the 20th century reduced rail-oriented employment opportunities and had a generally negative impact upon Victoria and the surrounding area. However, the community and Lunenburg County proved resilient, and by the late 1990s, transportation employment represented only a minimal portion of the area's economy.

One of the biggest industries in Victoria is the prison industry. Located two miles from the center of town, the Lunenburg Correctional Center provides employment for many people living in and around Victoria.

== Remembering Victoria's rail heritage ==
Early in the 21st century, work was begun to develop a rail heritage park and obtain a caboose to help present the town's rail heritage. After several years of work, one of the last C-10 cabooses built in-house by VGN employees at the company's massive shops complex in Princeton, West Virginia in the 1950s was located.

Rail preservationist, historian, and photographer Kenneth Miller of Roanoke had purchased Caboose 342 in the 1980s, and working with his father, had carefully restored it over a period of years. Miller, a long-time VGN fan, agreed to let Victoria have what is considered by many to be the finest extant VGN caboose for the new rail heritage park.

To prepare an appropriate display area for Caboose 342, a short stretch of roadbed was prepared, ballasted, and ties and rail were laid by volunteers in Victoria. The initials "H.H.R." and "W.N.P." were engraved as a lasting tribute to the founders of the Virginian Railway, industrialist and financier Henry Huttleston Rogers and coal mining manager and civil engineer William Nelson Page.

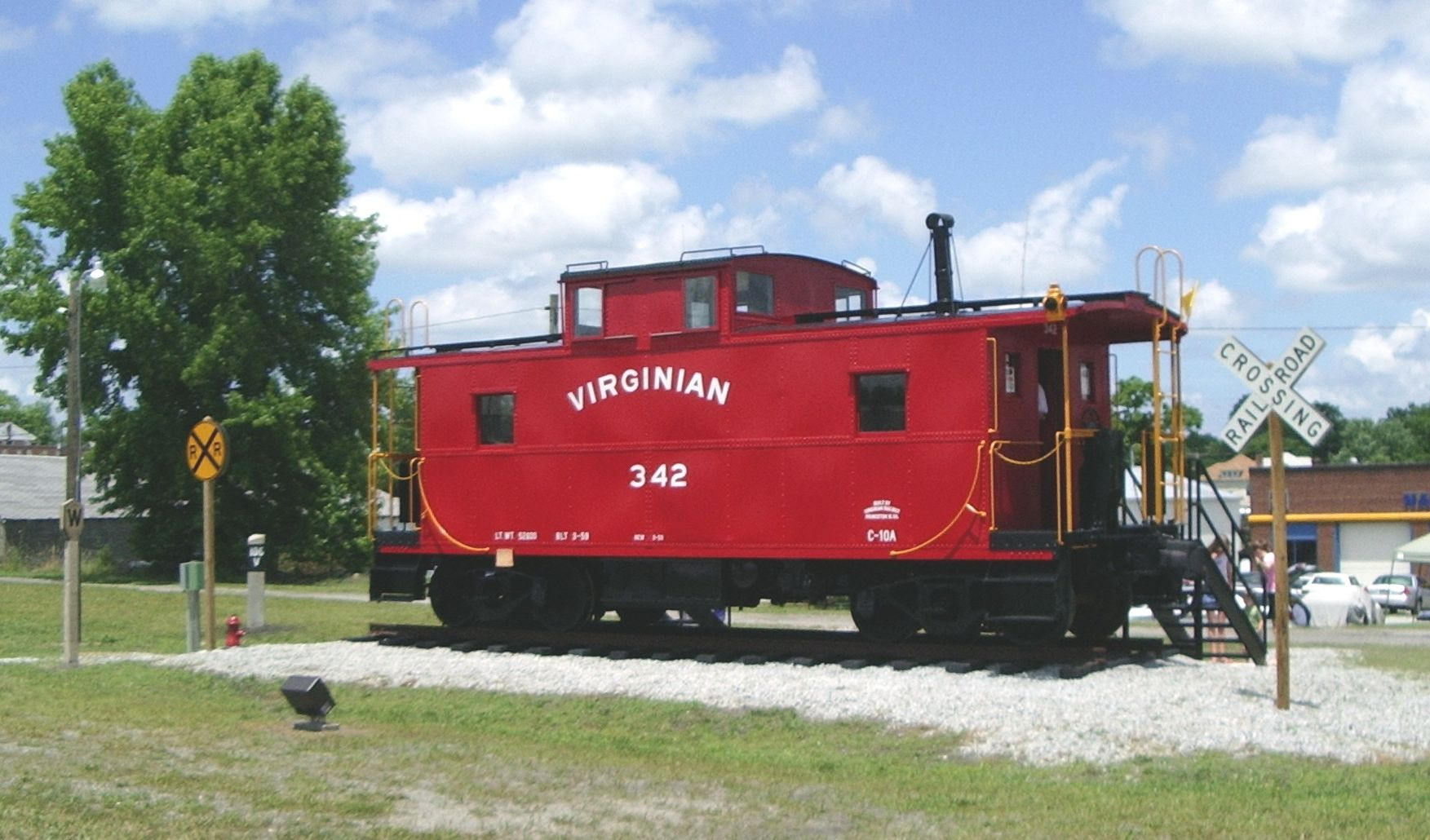
Virginian Railway restored and fully equipped caboose # 342 placed on static display in the town of Victoria

Late in 2004, Norfolk Southern carefully transported Caboose 342 from Roanoke to the NS rail yard at Crewe, Virginia by rail. From there, it traveled overland by truck and was placed on the new rails at Victoria on December 22, 2004. In Victoria, it has been placed on display fully equipped, and has become a popular attraction for school groups and retired railroaders alike.

== Geography ==
Victoria is located at 36°59′36″N 78°13′30″W (36.993365, −78.224891).

According to the United States Census Bureau, the town has a total area of 2.9 square miles (7.4 km^{2}), of which 2.8 square miles (7.3 km^{2}) is land and 0.04 square mile (0.1 km^{2}) (1.05%) is water.

== Demographics ==
Historical population
Census	Pop.	Note	%±
1910	682		—
1920	1,445		111.9%
1930	1,568		8.5%
1940	1,555		−0.8%
1950	1,607		3.3%
1960	1,737		8.1%
1970	1,408		−18.9%
1980	2,004		42.3%
1990	1,830		−8.7%
2000	1,821		−0.5%
2010	1,725		−5.3%
2020	1,734		0.5%
U.S. Decennial Census

=== 2020 census ===
As of the 2020 census, Victoria had a population of 1,734. The median age was 41.8 years. 24.6% of residents were under the age of 18 and 22.9% of residents were 65 years of age or older. For every 100 females there were 83.1 males, and for every 100 females age 18 and over there were 76.1 males age 18 and over.

0.0% of residents lived in urban areas, while 100.0% lived in rural areas.

There were 785 households in Victoria, of which 31.7% had children under the age of 18 living in them. Of all households, 33.0% were married-couple households, 19.4% were households with a male householder and no spouse or partner present, and 40.0% were households with a female householder and no spouse or partner present. About 35.6% of all households were made up of individuals and 19.6% had someone living alone who was 65 years of age or older.

There were 886 housing units, of which 11.4% were vacant. The homeowner vacancy rate was 1.6% and the rental vacancy rate was 3.1%.

Racial composition as of the 2020 census
Race	Number	Percent
White	1,102	63.6%
Black or African American	510	29.4%
American Indian and Alaska Native	3	0.2%
Asian	4	0.2%
Native Hawaiian and Other Pacific Islander	4	0.2%
Some other race	30	1.7%
Two or more races	81	4.7%
Hispanic or Latino (of any race)	39	2.2%

=== 2000 census ===
As of the census of 2000, there were 1,821 people, 803 households, and 517 families residing in the town. The population density was 644.6 people per square mile (248.4/km^{2}). There were 903 housing units at an average density of 319.6 per square mile (123.2/km^{2}). The racial makeup of the town was 76.22% White, 21.47% African American, 0.16% Native American, 0.05% Asian, 0.38% from other races, and 1.70% from two or more races. Hispanic or Latino of any race were 1.37% of the population.

There were 803 households, out of which 26.3% had children under the age of 18 living with them, 45.1% were married couples living together, 15.2% had a female householder with no husband present, and 35.6% were non-families. 33.0% of all households were made up of individuals, and 18.4% had someone living alone who was 65 years of age or older. The average household size was 2.27 and the average family size was 2.85.

In the town, the population was spread out, with 22.8% under the age of 18, 7.9% from 18 to 24, 22.9% from 25 to 44, 25.3% from 45 to 64, and 21.0% who were 65 years of age or older. The median age was 42 years. For every 100 females, there were 85.6 males. For every 100 females aged 18 and over, there were 80.4 males.

The median income for a household in the town was $24,694, and the median income for a family was $32,311. Males had a median income of $26,797 versus $17,054 for females. The per capita income for the town was $13,693. About 18.6% of families and 24.6% of the population were below the poverty line, including 38.9% of those under age 18 and 18.2% of those age 65 or over.
