= Fort Mitchell, Virginia =

Unincorporated community in Virginia, United States

- Unincorporated community
- Location within Virginia Location within the United States
- Coordinates: 36°55′5.30″N 78°29′9.99″W
- Country: United States
- State: Virginia
- County: Lunenburg
- Time zone: UTC−5 (Eastern (EST))
  - Summer (DST): UTC−4 (EDT)
- ZIP code: 23941
- Area code: 434

Fort Mitchell is an unincorporated community in Lunenburg County, Virginia, United States.

== Geography ==
Fort Mitchell is located at 36°55′5.30″N 78°29′9.99″W, about 1.7 miles (2.7 km) east of US 360, 9 miles (14 km) south of Keysville in Charlotte County, 15 miles (24 km) west of Lunenburg in Lunenburg County and 9 miles (14 km) north of Chase City in Mecklenburg County.
