= Lunenburg, Virginia =

- Census-designated place
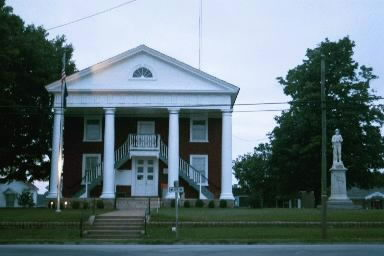
- Lunenburg Courthouse

- Location within Virginia Location within the United States
- Coordinates: 36°57′40″N 78°15′56″W
- Country: United States
- State: Virginia
- County: Lunenburg

Area
  - Total: 2.14 sq mi (5.54 km^{2})
  - Land: 2.14 sq mi (5.54 km^{2})
  - Water: 0 sq mi (0.0 km^{2})
- Elevation: 512 ft (156 m)

Population (2010)
  - Total: 165
  - Density: 77/sq mi (29.8/km^{2})
- Time zone: UTC−5 (Eastern (EST))
  - Summer (DST): UTC−4 (EDT)
- ZIP code: 23952
- Area code: 434
- FIPS code: 51-47496
- GNIS feature ID: 1498509
- Website: https://www.lunenburgva.gov

Lunenburg is a census-designated place (CDP) in and the county seat of Lunenburg County, Virginia, United States. As of the 2020 census, Lunenburg had a population of 142. The community is also known as Lunenburg Courthouse or Lunenburg Court House.

== Geography ==
Lunenburg is in the center of Lunenburg County in southeastern Virginia. It is 3 miles (5 km) southwest of Victoria, the largest town in the county. Virginia State Routes 40 and 49 pass through Lunenburg. SR 40 leads northwest 14 miles (23 km) to Keysville, while SR 49 leads southwest 16 miles (26 km) to Chase City. The highways join in Lunenburg and lead northeast together to Victoria.

According to the U.S. Census Bureau, the Lunenburg CDP has an area of 2.1 square miles (5.5 km^{2}), all land. The community sits on a ridge which drains northwest to Couches Creek and south to Reedy Creek, both tributaries of the Meherrin River, which flows southeast to the Chowan River and Albemarle Sound in North Carolina.

== Demographics ==
Historical population
Census	Pop.	Note	%±
2010	165		—
2020	142		−13.9%
U.S. Decennial Census; 2010 2020

Lunenburg was first listed as a census designated place in the 2010 U.S. census.
