= Kenbridge, Virginia =

- Town
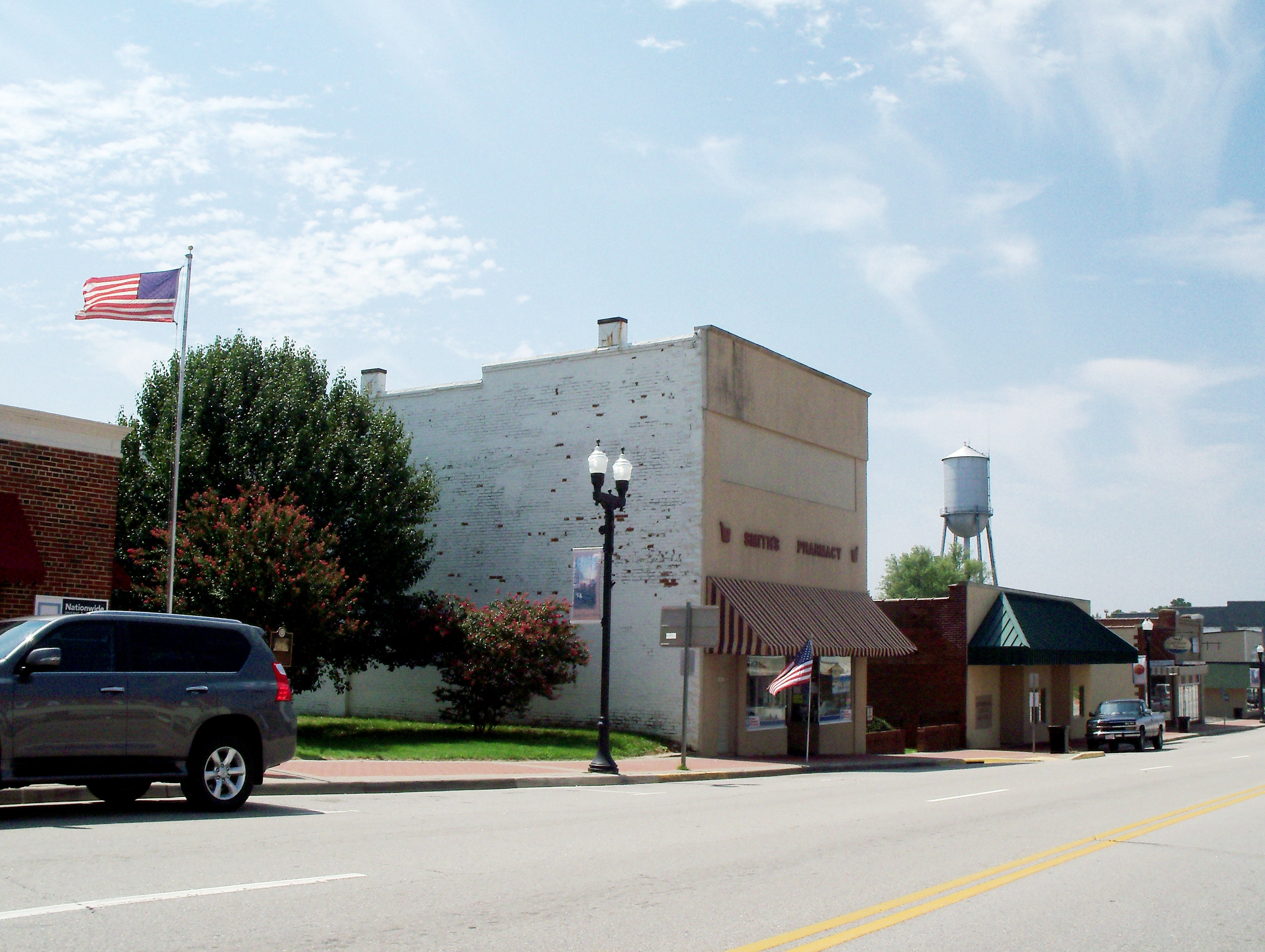
- Central Kenbridge

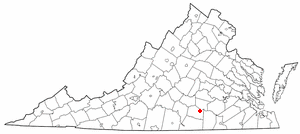
- Location in Virginia
- Coordinates: 36°57′46″N 78°7′37″W
- Country: United States
- State: Virginia
- County: Lunenburg
- Founded: 1908

Government
  - Mayor: Wanda Morrison
  - Town Manager: Tony Matthews

Area
  - Total: 2.31 sq mi (5.97 km^{2})
  - Land: 2.31 sq mi (5.97 km^{2})
  - Water: 0 sq mi (0.00 km^{2})
- Elevation: 515 ft (157 m)

Population (2020)
  - Total: 1,112
  - Estimate (2019): 1,197
  - Density: 519.2/sq mi (200.47/km^{2})
- Time zone: UTC-5 (Eastern (EST))
  - Summer (DST): UTC-4 (EDT)
- ZIP code: 23944
- Area code: 434
- FIPS code: 51-41832
- GNIS feature ID: 1495781
- Website: kenbridgeva.net

Kenbridge is a town in Lunenburg County, Virginia, United States. As of the 2020 census, Kenbridge had a population of 1,112. It is in a tobacco farming area. The area is home to noted folk artist Eldridge Bagley. The town is home to the Lunenburg Girls’ Softball league, Lunenburg Lightning Football and Cheerleading league and the United Futbol Soccer league. There are many quaint shops and boutiques and many family-owned businesses. Home to Kenbridge Elementary School. Visit www.kenbridgeva.net for information.

== Geography ==
Kenbridge is located at 36°57′46″N 78°7′37″W (36.962805, -78.126896).

According to the United States Census Bureau, the town has a total area of 2.0 square miles (5.3 km^{2}), all land.

Brickland, the Fifth Avenue Historic District, Flat Rock, and the Jones Farm are listed on the National Register of Historic Places.

== Demographics ==
Historical population
Census	Pop.	Note	%±
1910	196		—
1920	543		177.0%
1930	753		38.7%
1940	847		12.5%
1950	1,176		38.8%
1960	1,188		1.0%
1970	1,223		2.9%
1980	1,352		10.5%
1990	1,264		−6.5%
2000	1,253		−0.9%
2010	1,257		0.3%
2020	1,112		−11.5%
U.S. Decennial Census

At the 2000 census there were 1,253 people, 529 households, and 320 families living in the town. The population density was 614.6 people per square mile (237.1/km^{2}). There were 579 housing units at an average density of 284.0 per square mile (109.6/km^{2}). The racial makeup of the town was 51.56% White, 44.93% African American, 0.40% Asian, 1.28% from other races, and 1.84% from two or more races. Hispanic or Latino of any race were 4.39%.

Of the 529 households 20.8% had children under the age of 18 living with them, 38.9% were married couples living together, 15.9% had a female householder with no husband present, and 39.5% were non-families. 35.7% of households were one person and 19.1% were one person aged 65 or older. The average household size was 2.24 and the average family size was 2.83.

The age distribution was 21.9% under the age of 18, 9.8% from 18 to 24, 23.0% from 25 to 44, 25.9% from 45 to 64, and 19.4% 65 or older. The median age was 41 years. For every 100 females there were 101.1 males. For every 100 females aged 18 and over, there were 99.0 males.

The median income for a household in the town was $26,818, and the median family income was $38,929. Males had a median income of $22,083 versus $18,456 for females. The per capita income for the town was $15,386. About 11.4% of families and 18.8% of the population were below the poverty line, including 27.8% of those under age 18 and 18.7% of those age 65 or over.
