= Lunenburg County, Virginia =

County in Virginia, United States

- County
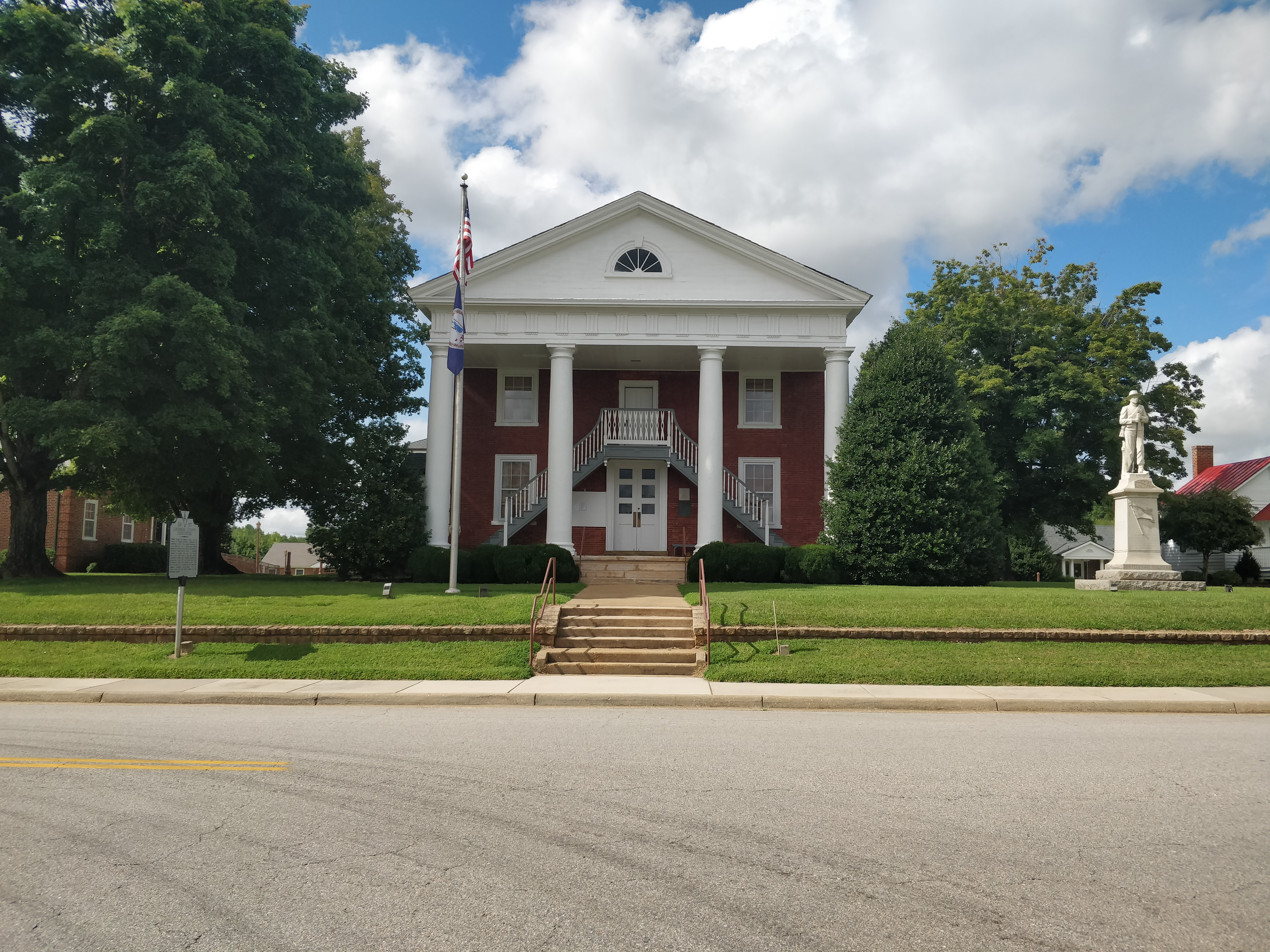
- Lunenburg County Courthouse and Confederate Monument

- Seal
- Motto: The Old Free State
- Location within the U.S. state of Virginia
- Coordinates: 36°57′N 78°14′W
- Country: United States
- State: Virginia
- Founded: 1746
- Named for: Brunswick-Lüneburg
- Seat: Lunenburg
- Largest town: Victoria

Area
  - Total: 432 sq mi (1,120 km^{2})
  - Land: 432 sq mi (1,120 km^{2})
  - Water: 0.7 sq mi (1.8 km^{2}) 0.2%

Population (2020)
  - Total: 11,936
  - Estimate (2025): 12,058 ▲
  - Density: 27.6/sq mi (10.7/km^{2})
- Time zone: UTC−5 (Eastern)
  - Summer (DST): UTC−4 (EDT)
- Congressional district: 5th
- Website: www.lunenburgva.gov

Lunenburg County is a county located in the Commonwealth of Virginia. As of the 2020 census, the population was 11,936. Its county seat is Lunenburg.

== History ==
Lunenburg County was established on May 1, 1746, from the western portion of Brunswick County. Its name comes from one of the titles of King George II, who was also the Duke of Brunswick-Lünenburg in Germany. In 1753, the southwestern portion of Lunenburg, formed Halifax County and Bedford County was established from the northwestern portion. In 1764, both Charlotte and Mecklenburg counties were created from Lunenburg. It is nicknamed the "Old Free State" because during the buildup of the Civil War, it let Virginia know the county would break off if the state did not join the Confederacy.

Among the earliest settlers of the county was William Taylor, born in King William County, Virginia. He was the son of Rev. Daniel Taylor, a Virginia native and Anglican priest educated at Trinity College, Cambridge University in England, and his wife Alice (Littlepage) Taylor. William Taylor married Martha Waller, a daughter of Benjamin Waller of Williamsburg, Virginia.

In 1760 Taylor purchased three adjoining tracts of land in Lunenburg County totaling 827 acres (3.35 km^{2}). He soon became one of the county's leading citizens, representing Lunenburg in the Virginia House of Burgesses from 1765 until 1768. In that capacity, he voted in 1765 to support statesman Patrick Henry's Virginia Resolves in 1765. (Note: At his death in 1820, a Richmond newspaper noted in its obituary of William Taylor that he was the last man known to be alive who had heard Patrick Henry's famous "Give me liberty or give me death" speech in the Virginia House of Burgesses.) Taylor served as county clerk for 51 years (1763–1814).

Taylor was succeeded as county clerk by his son William Henry Taylor, who held the office for another 32 years—from 1814 until 1846. Another son, General Waller Taylor, represented Lunenburg in the Virginia legislature, then moved to Vincennes, Indiana. There he became a judge and subsequently Adjutant General of the United States Army under General William Henry Harrison in the War of 1812. General Waller Taylor later served as one of the first United States senators from the newly created state of Indiana from 1816 to 1825. He died on a visit home to see his relatives in Lunenburg County in 1826.

During much of the American Civil War, the family of Missionary Bishop Henry C. Lay lived in Lunenberg County, where Mrs. Lay (the former Eliza Withers Atkinson) grew up. Both of Bishop Lay's brothers served as Confederate colonels, and Mrs. Lay's uncle, Thomas Atkinson was bishop of North Carolina.

Cases surrounding an 1895 Lunenburg County murder are the subject of historian Suzanne Lebsock's book, A Murder in Virginia: Southern Justice on Trial.

== Geography ==
According to the U.S. Census Bureau, the county has a total area of 432 square miles (1,120 km^{2}), of which 432 square miles (1,120 km^{2}) is land and 1 square mile (2.6 km^{2}) (0.16%) is water.

=== Adjacent counties ===
- Brunswick County (east)
- Charlotte County (west)
- Mecklenburg County (south)
- Nottoway County (northeast)
- Prince Edward County (north)

=== Major highways ===
- US 360 (Eastbound Only – Three-Sixty Hwy)
- SR 40 (Lunenburg County Rd; joins SR 49 and becomes Courthouse Rd; Court St and Main St in Victoria; K-V Rd; Main St and S Broad St in Kenbridge, Blackstone Rd)
- SR 49 (Falls Rd; joins SR 40 in Victoria and becomes Main St; Courthouse Rd)
- SR 137 (E 5th Ave; S Hill Rd; Dundas Rd)
- SR 138 (E 5th Ave; S Hill Rd)

== Demographics ==
Historical population
Census	Pop.	Note	%±
1790	8,959		—
1800	10,381		15.9%
1810	12,265		18.1%
1820	10,662		−13.1%
1830	11,957		12.1%
1840	11,055		−7.5%
1850	11,692		5.8%
1860	11,983		2.5%
1870	10,403		−13.2%
1880	11,535		10.9%
1890	11,372		−1.4%
1900	11,705		2.9%
1910	12,780		9.2%
1920	15,260		19.4%
1930	14,058		−7.9%
1940	13,844		−1.5%
1950	14,116		2.0%
1960	12,523		−11.3%
1970	11,687		−6.7%
1980	12,124		3.7%
1990	11,419		−5.8%
2000	13,146		15.1%
2010	12,914		−1.8%
2020	11,936		−7.6%
2025 (est.)	12,058	▲	1.0%
U.S. Decennial Census; 1790–1960 1900–1990; 1990–2000 2010 2020

=== Racial and ethnic composition ===
Lunenburg County, Virginia – Racial and ethnic composition Note: the US Census treats Hispanic/Latino as an ethnic category. This table excludes Latinos from the racial categories and assigns them to a separate category. Hispanics/Latinos may be of any race.
Race / Ethnicity (NH = Non-Hispanic)	Pop 1980	Pop 1990	Pop 2000	Pop 2010	Pop 2020	% 1980	% 1990	% 2000	% 2010	% 2020
White alone (NH)	7,283	7,040	7,695	7,730	7,016	60.07%	61.65%	58.53%	59.86%	58.78%
Black or African American alone (NH)	4,694	4,266	5,044	4,451	3,773	38.72%	37.36%	38.37%	34.47%	31.61%
Native American or Alaska Native alone (NH)	8	11	20	37	32	0.07%	0.10%	0.15%	0.29%	0.27%
Asian alone (NH)	7	19	27	25	25	0.06%	0.17%	0.21%	0.19%	0.21%
Native Hawaiian or Pacific Islander alone (NH)	x	x	1	3	5	x	x	0.01%	0.02%	0.04%
Other race alone (NH)	8	0	5	9	31	0.07%	0.00%	0.04%	0.07%	0.26%
Mixed race or Multiracial (NH)	x	x	119	189	465	x	x	0.91%	1.46%	3.90%
Hispanic or Latino (any race)	124	83	235	470	589	1.02%	0.73%	1.79%	3.64%	4.93%
Total	12,124	11,419	13,146	12,914	11,936	100.00%	100.00%	100.00%	100.00%	100.00%

=== 2020 census ===
As of the 2020 census, the county had a population of 11,936. The median age was 45.6 years. 19.7% of residents were under the age of 18 and 23.6% of residents were 65 years of age or older. For every 100 females there were 109.8 males, and for every 100 females age 18 and over there were 110.1 males age 18 and over.

The racial makeup of the county was 59.4% White, 31.9% Black or African American, 0.3% American Indian and Alaska Native, 0.2% Asian, 0.1% Native Hawaiian and Pacific Islander, 2.9% from some other race, and 5.2% from two or more races. Hispanic or Latino residents of any race comprised 4.9% of the population.

0.0% of residents lived in urban areas, while 100.0% lived in rural areas.

There were 4,758 households in the county, of which 26.2% had children under the age of 18 living with them and 31.3% had a female householder with no spouse or partner present. About 32.4% of all households were made up of individuals and 18.1% had someone living alone who was 65 years of age or older.

There were 5,868 housing units, of which 18.9% were vacant. Among occupied housing units, 72.0% were owner-occupied and 28.0% were renter-occupied. The homeowner vacancy rate was 2.1% and the rental vacancy rate was 6.3%.

=== 2000 census ===
As of the census of 2000, there were 13,146 people, 4,998 households, and 3,383 families residing in the county. The population density was 30 people per square mile (12 people/km^{2}). There were 5,736 housing units at an average density of 13 units per square mile (5.0 units/km^{2}). The racial makeup of the county was 59.12% White, 38.58% Black or African American, 0.16% Native American, 0.21% Asian, 0.05% Pacific Islander, 0.75% from other races, and 1.14% from two or more races. 1.79% of the population were Hispanic or Latino of any race.

There were 4,998 households, out of which 27.30% had children under the age of 18 living with them, 49.50% were married couples living together, 13.30% had a female householder with no husband present, and 32.30% were non-families. 28.70% of all households were made up of individuals, and 14.70% had someone living alone who was 65 years of age or older. The average household size was 2.39 and the average family size was 2.91.

In the county, the population was spread out, with 21.30% under the age of 18, 8.00% from 18 to 24, 28.10% from 25 to 44, 25.80% from 45 to 64, and 16.80% who were 65 years of age or older. The median age was 40 years. For every 100 females there were 113.80 males. For every 100 females aged 18 and over, there were 115.70 males.

The median income for a household in the county was $27,899, and the median income for a family was $34,302. Males had a median income of $26,496 versus $20,237 for females. The per capita income for the county was $14,951. About 14.90% of families and 20.00% of the population were below the poverty line, including 27.30% of those under age 18 and 22.80% of those age 65 or over.

== Politics ==
United States presidential election results for Lunenburg County, Virginia
Year	Republican		Democratic		Third party(ies)	
Year	No.	%	No.	%	No.	%
1912	66	10.51%	508	80.89%	54	8.60%
1916	110	11.74%	814	86.87%	13	1.39%
1920	208	20.08%	818	78.96%	10	0.97%
1924	130	12.55%	686	66.22%	220	21.24%
1928	314	20.75%	1,199	79.25%	0	0.00%
1932	92	7.38%	1,141	91.50%	14	1.12%
1936	77	5.62%	1,291	94.23%	2	0.15%
1940	144	10.60%	1,213	89.26%	2	0.15%
1944	184	13.21%	1,205	86.50%	4	0.29%
1948	251	14.61%	1,126	65.54%	341	19.85%
1952	837	35.27%	1,528	64.39%	8	0.34%
1956	580	24.80%	1,111	47.50%	648	27.70%
1960	838	35.22%	1,451	60.99%	90	3.78%
1964	1,847	62.04%	1,128	37.89%	2	0.07%
1968	1,181	29.44%	1,180	29.41%	1,651	41.15%
1972	2,464	69.14%	1,044	29.29%	56	1.57%
1976	1,816	49.73%	1,739	47.62%	97	2.66%
1980	2,045	49.44%	1,958	47.34%	133	3.22%
1984	2,713	59.94%	1,754	38.75%	59	1.30%
1988	2,530	56.27%	1,870	41.59%	96	2.14%
1992	2,227	45.34%	2,082	42.39%	603	12.28%
1996	2,063	46.26%	1,995	44.73%	402	9.01%
2000	2,510	54.67%	2,026	44.13%	55	1.20%
2004	2,858	54.49%	2,362	45.03%	25	0.48%
2008	2,900	51.33%	2,703	47.84%	47	0.83%
2012	2,969	51.78%	2,684	46.81%	81	1.41%
2016	3,204	57.36%	2,227	39.87%	155	2.77%
2020	3,537	58.95%	2,418	40.30%	45	0.75%
2024	3,594	61.07%	2,253	38.28%	38	0.65%

== Education ==
Lunenburg County Public Schools operates the following schools:

- Kenbridge Elementary School – Kenbridge, VA
- Victoria Elementary School – Victoria, VA
- Lunenburg Middle School – Victoria, VA
- Central High School – Victoria, VA

There are no private or independent schools in Lunenburg County, and no colleges or universities are located there. Kenston Forest School in Nottoway County, approximately 20 minutes away, offers the closest K-12 private education available to Lunenburg County residents.

== Communities ==
=== Towns ===
- Kenbridge
- Victoria

=== Census-designated place ===
- Lunenburg

=== Other unincorporated communities ===
- Dundas
- Fort Mitchell
- Meherrin
- Rehoboth

== Notable people ==
- Lewis Archer Boswell, experimented with flying aircraft. Local legends claim he achieved heavier-than-air flight before the Wright Brothers, though there is no historical evidence.
- Paul Carrington (1733–1818), second member appointed of the Virginia Supreme Court.
- Roy Clark, born in Meherrin; became a highly acclaimed country musician and a United Nations Goodwill Ambassador
- Henry W. Collier, born in the county; fourteenth governor of Alabama, 1849–1853
- Alfred L. Cralle, born in the county; inventor and businessman in Pittsburgh, Pennsylvania; best remembered for inventing the lever-operated ice cream scoop in 1897
- Anthony Davis, NFL football player, currently for the New Orleans Saints (beginning 2009) from Lunenburg County, attended Central High School in Victoria
- Richard Ellis, born and raised in Lunenburg County, settled in Alabama where he was a member of Alabama's Constitutional Convention in 1818 and an associate justice of the Alabama Supreme Court (1819–1826)
- James Greene Hardy, a county native; lt. governor of the Commonwealth of Kentucky, serving 1855–1856
- John A. Murrell (1806?–1844), born in the county; bandit, known for the Mystic Clan or Mystic Confederacy and Murrell Insurrection Conspiracy
- John Hampden Randolph (1813–1883), Louisiana planter
- Verner Moore White (1863–1923), born in the county; landscape and portrait artist

== See also ==
- National Register of Historic Places listings in Lunenburg County, Virginia
