= List of towns in Virginia =

188 incorporated towns

This is a complete list of towns in the Commonwealth of Virginia in the United States. An incorporated town in Virginia is the equivalent of a city in most other states, i.e. a municipality which is part of a county. Incorporated cities in Virginia are independent jurisdictions and separate from any county. As of 2024, there are 188 incorporated towns out of 226 municipalities, some of which are more populous than many independent cities, but are not incorporated as cities and are therefore situated within a parent county or counties.

New towns may be incorporated but must have a minimum population of 1,000 residents. Cities with populations of less than 50,000 are eligible to become towns through reversion. The newest town and newest former town are Bedford in Bedford County, which ceased to be an independent city in 2013, moving to town status, and Glen Lyn in Giles County, which disincorporated in 2024. For a complete list of independent cities, see List of cities in Virginia. For major unincorporated population centers, see List of unincorporated communities in Virginia.

== Complete list ==
Population figures reflect the Census Bureau's official 2020 population census, and geographic coordinates are derived from 2016 Census Bureau figures.

Name	Population	County	Photo
Abingdon	8,376	Washington; 36°42′33″N 81°58′15″W	
Accomac	519	Accomack; 37°43′10″N 75°40′4″W	
Alberta	302	Brunswick; 36°51′14″N 77°53′38″W	
Altavista	3,378	Campbell; 37°7′24″N 79°17′0″W	
Amherst	2,110	Amherst; 37°34′55″N 79°3′7″W	
Appalachia	1,432	Wise; 36°54′18″N 82°46′48″W	
Appomattox	1,919	Appomattox; 37°21′31″N 78°49′35″W	
Ashland	7,565	Hanover; 37°45′37″N 77°28′15″W	
Bedford	6,657	Bedford; 37°20′11″N 79°31′4″W	
Belle Haven	543	Accomack; 37°33′17″N 75°49′26″W	
Belle Haven	543	Northampton; 37°33′17″N 75°49′26″W	
Berryville	4,574	Clarke; 39°9′4″N 77°58′56″W	
Big Stone Gap	5,254	Wise; 36°51′40″N 82°46′39″W	
Blacksburg	44,826	Montgomery; 37°13′53″N 80°25′36″W	
Blackstone	3,352	Nottoway; 37°4′55″N 78°0′10″W	
Bloxom	387	Accomack; 37°49′45″N 75°37′17″W	
Bluefield	5,096	Tazewell; 37°14′7″N 81°16′29″W	
Boones Mill	259	Franklin; 37°7′8″N 79°57′2″W	
Bowling Green	1,168	Caroline; 38°3′12″N 77°20′51″W	
Boyce	749	Clarke; 39°5′36″N 78°3′37″W	
Boydton	302	Mecklenburg; 36°39′58″N 78°23′27″W	
Boykins	516	Southampton; 36°34′40″N 77°11′56″W	
Branchville	118	Southampton; 36°34′11″N 77°15′0″W	
Bridgewater	6,596	Rockingham; 38°23′19″N 78°57′52″W	
Broadway	4,170	Rockingham; 38°36′31″N 78°48′5″W	
Brodnax	283	Brunswick; 36°42′11″N 78°1′55″W	
Brodnax	283	Mecklenburg; 36°42′11″N 78°1′55″W	
Brookneal	1,090	Campbell; 37°2′52″N 78°57′14″W	
Buchanan	1,196	Botetourt; 37°31′15″N 79°41′28″W	
Burkeville	417	Nottoway; 37°11′16″N 78°11′40″W	
Cape Charles	1,178	Northampton; 37°14′59″N 76°0′51″W	
Capron	141	Southampton; 36°42′34″N 77°12′5″W	
Cedar Bluff	1,069	Tazewell; 37°5′13″N 81°45′51″W	
Charlotte Court House	505	Charlotte; 37°3′23″N 78°38′16″W	
Chase City	2,053	Mecklenburg; 36°47′59″N 78°27′39″W	
Chatham	1,232	Pittsylvania; 36°48′43″N 79°24′0″W	
Cheriton	486	Northampton; 37°17′40″N 75°57′56″W	
Chilhowie	1,654	Smyth; 36°48′1″N 81°40′58″W	
Chincoteague	3,344	Accomack; 37°56′58″N 75°21′9″W	
Christiansburg	23,348	Montgomery; 37°8′28″N 80°24′5″W	
Claremont	305	Surry; 37°13′38″N 76°57′59″W	
Clarksville	1,300	Mecklenburg; 36°37′6″N 78°33′52″W	
Cleveland	136	Russell; 36°56′37″N 82°9′9″W	
Clifton	243	Fairfax; 38°46′48″N 77°23′10″W	
Clifton Forge	3,555	Alleghany; 37°49′24″N 79°49′31″W	
Clinchco	244	Dickenson; 37°9′27″N 82°21′16″W	
Clinchport	64	Scott; 36°40′48″N 82°44′39″W	
Clintwood	1,377	Dickenson; 37°9′11″N 82°27′36″W	
Coeburn	1,598	Wise; 36°56′51″N 82°28′4″W	
Colonial Beach	3,908	Westmoreland; 38°15′52″N 76°59′37″W	
Courtland	1,295	Southampton; 36°42′44″N 77°3′43″W	
Craigsville	899	Augusta; 38°5′4″N 79°23′4″W	
Crewe	2,262	Nottoway; 37°10′52″N 78°7′49″W	
Culpeper	20,062	Culpeper; 38°28′13″N 77°59′59″W	
Damascus	788	Washington; 36°37′58″N 81°47′22″W	
Dayton	1,688	Rockingham; 38°25′2″N 78°56′28″W	
Dendron	251	Surry; 37°2′11″N 76°55′27″W	
Dillwyn	436	Buckingham; 37°32′26″N 78°27′40″W	
Drakes Branch	533	Charlotte; 36°59′36″N 78°36′3″W	
Dublin	2,682	Pulaski; 37°6′20″N 80°41′23″W	
Duffield	73	Scott; 36°43′11″N 82°47′46″W	
Dumfries	5,679	Prince William; 38°34′2″N 77°19′21″W	
Dungannon	257	Scott; 36°49′42″N 82°28′5″W	
Eastville	300	Northampton; 37°21′4″N 75°56′26″W	
Edinburg	1,178	Shenandoah; 38°49′22″N 78°33′46″W	
Elkton	2,941	Rockingham; 38°24′38″N 78°36′58″W	
Exmore	1,473	Northampton; 37°31′46″N 75°49′42″W	
Farmville	7,846	Cumberland; 37°17′51″N 78°23′58″W	
Farmville	7,846	Prince Edward; 37°17′51″N 78°23′58″W	
Fincastle	755	Botetourt; 37°29′58″N 79°52′32″W	
Floyd	448	Floyd; 36°54′44″N 80°19′5″W	
Fries	450	Grayson; 36°42′51″N 80°58′30″W	
Front Royal	15,011	Warren; 38°55′30″N 78°11′0″W	
Gate City	2,043	Scott; 36°38′46″N 82°34′42″W	
Glade Spring	1,367	Washington; 36°47′24″N 81°46′20″W	
Glasgow	1,052	Rockbridge; 37°37′54″N 79°27′30″W	
Gordonsville	1,402	Orange; 38°8′11″N 78°11′20″W	
Goshen	338	Rockbridge; 37°59′23″N 79°30′26″W	
Gretna	1,310	Pittsylvania; 36°56′58″N 79°21′45″W	
Grottoes	2,899	Augusta; 38°16′11″N 78°49′33″W	
Grottoes	2,899	Rockingham; 38°16′11″N 78°49′33″W	
Grundy	875	Buchanan; 37°16′2″N 82°5′42″W	
Halifax	1,118	Halifax; 36°45′40″N 78°55′39″W	
Hallwood	202	Accomack; 37°52′39″N 75°35′22″W	
Hamilton	619	Loudoun; 39°8′5″N 77°39′51″W	
Haymarket	1,545	Prince William; 38°48′44″N 77°38′11″W	
Haysi	484	Dickenson; 37°13′1″N 82°17′38″W	
Herndon	24,655	Fairfax; 38°58′13″N 77°23′13″W	
Hillsboro	114	Loudoun; 39°12′2″N 77°43′31″W	
Hillsville	2,884	Carroll; 36°45′42″N 80°44′12″W	
Honaker	1,217	Russell; 37°0′56″N 81°58′7″W	
Hurt	1,267	Pittsylvania; 37°5′47″N 79°18′12″W	
Independence	1,011	Grayson; 36°37′39″N 81°8′57″W	
Iron Gate	324	Alleghany; 37°47′56″N 79°47′26″W	
Irvington	474	Lancaster; 37°39′45″N 76°25′12″W	
Ivor	312	Southampton; 36°54′4″N 76°53′41″W	
Jarratt	652	Greensville; 36°48′58″N 77°28′8″W	
Jarratt	652	Sussex; 36°48′58″N 77°28′8″W	
Jonesville	872	Lee; 36°41′14″N 83°6′55″W	
Keller	144	Accomack; 37°37′16″N 75°45′51″W	
Kenbridge	1,112	Lunenburg; 36°57′39″N 78°7′42″W	
Keysville	807	Charlotte; 37°2′20″N 78°28′49″W	
Kilmarnock	1,445	Lancaster; 37°42′39″N 76°22′58″W	
Kilmarnock	1,445	Northumberland; 37°42′39″N 76°22′58″W	
La Crosse	614	Mecklenburg; 36°42′5″N 78°5′39″W	
Lawrenceville	1,014	Brunswick; 36°45′23″N 77°51′14″W	
Lebanon	3,159	Russell; 36°53′58″N 82°4′43″W	
Leesburg	48,250	Loudoun; 39°6′23″N 77°33′20″W	
Louisa	1,987	Louisa; 38°1′0″N 77°59′59″W	
Lovettsville	2,694	Loudoun; 39°16′26″N 77°38′21″W	
Luray	4,831	Page; 38°39′53″N 78°27′18″W	
Madison	205	Madison; 38°22′44″N 78°15′31″W	
Marion	5,751	Smyth; 36°50′20″N 81°30′50″W	
McKenney	457	Dinwiddie; 36°59′7″N 77°43′19″W	
Melfa	396	Accomack; 37°38′57″N 75°44′27″W	
Middleburg	669	Loudoun; 38°58′17″N 77°44′23″W	
Middletown	1,355	Frederick; 39°1′45″N 78°16′40″W	
Mineral	470	Louisa; 38°0′27″N 77°54′22″W	
Monterey	165	Highland; 38°24′42″N 79°34′51″W	
Montross	333	Westmoreland; 38°5′33″N 76°48′57″W	
Mount Crawford	439	Rockingham; 38°21′39″N 78°56′28″W	
Mount Jackson	1,961	Shenandoah; 38°44′21″N 78°38′45″W	
Narrows	2,093	Giles; 37°19′53″N 80°48′33″W	
Nassawadox	533	Northampton; 37°28′35″N 75°51′33″W	
New Castle	125	Craig; 37°30′4″N 80°6′40″W	
New Market	2,155	Shenandoah; 38°38′25″N 78°40′8″W	
Newsoms	286	Southampton; 36°37′34″N 77°7′29″W	
Nickelsville	378	Scott; 36°44′55″N 82°25′2″W	
Occoquan	1,035	Prince William; 38°40′48″N 77°15′31″W	
Onancock	1,169	Accomack; 37°42′36″N 75°44′37″W	
Onley	532	Accomack; 37°41′29″N 75°43′2″W	
Orange	4,880	Orange; 38°15′1″N 78°6′41″W	
Painter	272	Accomack; 37°35′7″N 75°47′1″W	
Pamplin City	138	Appomattox; 37°15′59″N 78°41′1″W	
Pamplin City	138	Prince Edward; 37°15′59″N 78°41′1″W	
Parksley	816	Accomack; 37°47′11″N 75°39′14″W	
Pearisburg	2,909	Giles; 37°19′43″N 80°43′38″W	
Pembroke	1,152	Giles; 37°19′20″N 80°38′10″W	
Pennington Gap	1,624	Lee; 36°45′33″N 83°1′46″W	
Phenix	232	Charlotte; 37°4′52″N 78°44′55″W	
Pocahontas	268	Tazewell; 37°18′35″N 81°20′45″W	
Port Royal	196	Caroline; 38°9′54″N 77°11′57″W	
Pound	877	Wise; 37°7′34″N 82°36′26″W	
Pulaski	8,985	Pulaski; 37°3′10″N 80°45′43″W	
Purcellville	8,929	Loudoun; 39°8′15″N 77°42′41″W	
Quantico	578	Prince William; 38°31′21″N 77°17′25″W	
Remington	667	Fauquier; 38°32′5″N 77°48′30″W	
Rich Creek	749	Giles; 37°23′0″N 80°49′14″W	
Richlands	5,261	Tazewell; 37°5′17″N 81°48′37″W	
Ridgeway	752	Henry; 36°34′41″N 79°51′30″W	
Rocky Mount	4,903	Franklin; 37°0′16″N 79°53′4″W	
Round Hill	693	Loudoun; 39°7′53″N 77°46′2″W	
Rural Retreat	1,546	Wythe; 36°54′18″N 81°16′38″W	
St. Paul	866	Russell; 36°54′28″N 82°18′57″W	
St. Paul	866	Wise; 36°54′28″N 82°18′57″W	
Saltville	1,824	Smyth; 36°52′33″N 81°45′46″W	
Saltville	1,824	Washington; 36°52′33″N 81°45′46″W	
Saxis	172	Accomack; 37°55′33″N 75°43′25″W	
Scottsburg	127	Halifax; 36°45′33″N 78°47′28″W	
Scottsville	524	Albemarle; 37°48′41″N 78°29′18″W	
Scottsville	524	Fluvanna; 37°48′41″N 78°29′18″W	
Shenandoah	2,486	Page; 38°29′14″N 78°36′59″W	
Smithfield	8,533	Isle of Wight; 36°58′19″N 76°36′47″W	
South Boston	7,966	Halifax; 36°42′43″N 78°54′48″W	
South Hill	4,690	Mecklenburg; 36°43′32″N 78°7′44″W	
Stanardsville	349	Greene; 38°17′57″N 78°26′12″W	
Stanley	1,703	Page; 38°34′52″N 78°29′58″W	
Stephens City	2,016	Frederick; 39°5′35″N 78°13′6″W	
Stony Creek	209	Sussex; 36°56′53″N 77°24′0″W	
Strasburg	7,083	Shenandoah; 38°59′43″N 78°20′42″W	
Stuart	1,431	Patrick; 36°38′28″N 80°16′8″W	
Surry	208	Surry; 37°8′13″N 76°50′0″W	
Tangier	436	Accomack; 37°49′24″N 75°59′34″W	
Tappahannock	2,193	Essex; 37°54′45″N 76°51′58″W	
Tazewell	4,486	Tazewell; 37°7′44″N 81°30′23″W	
The Plains	245	Fauquier; 38°51′43″N 77°46′28″W	
Timberville	2,963	Rockingham; 38°38′0″N 78°46′13″W	
Toms Brook	276	Shenandoah; 38°56′51″N 78°26′22″W	
Troutdale	145	Grayson; 36°41′46″N 81°26′15″W	
Troutville	458	Botetourt; 37°25′0″N 79°52′41″W	
Urbanna	492	Middlesex; 37°38′24″N 76°34′30″W	
Victoria	1,734	Lunenburg; 36°59′40″N 78°13′27″W	
Vienna	16,473	Fairfax; 38°53′55″N 77°15′30″W	
Vinton	8,059	Roanoke; 37°16′27″N 79°53′17″W	
Virgilina	126	Halifax; 36°32′44″N 78°46′31″W	
Wachapreague	257	Accomack; 37°36′23″N 75°41′23″W	
Wakefield	759	Sussex; 36°58′9″N 76°59′17″W	
Warrenton	10,057	Fauquier; 38°43′4″N 77°47′50″W	
Warsaw	1,637	Richmond; 37°57′37″N 76°45′40″W	
Washington	86	Rappahannock; 38°42′42″N 78°9′36″W	
Waverly	1,955	Sussex; 37°2′2″N 77°5′44″W	
Weber City	1,250	Scott; 36°37′25″N 82°33′48″W	
West Point	3,414	King William; 37°33′8″N 76°48′7″W	
White Stone	380	Lancaster; 37°38′41″N 76°23′24″W	
Windsor	2,746	Isle of Wight; 36°48′39″N 76°44′17″W	
Wise	2,971	Wise; 36°58′36″N 82°34′50″W	
Woodstock	5,807	Shenandoah; 38°52′20″N 78°31′2″W	
Wytheville	8,265	Wythe; 36°57′12″N 81°5′18″W	

== Note ==
The towns of Castlewood (Russell County), Clover (Halifax County), Columbia (Fluvanna County), St. Charles (Lee County), and Glen Lyn (Giles County) were disincorporated in 1997, 1998, 2016, 2022, and 2024 respectively.
