= Virginia State Route 92 =

State highway in southern Virginia, US

State Route 92

Route information
- Maintained by VDOT
- Length: 28.97 mi (46.62 km)
- Existed: 1940–present

Major junctions
- South end: US 58 Bus. / SR 707 in Boydton
- US 58 in Boydton; SR 47 / SR 49 in Chase City; US 15 in Barnes Junction
- North end: US 360 / SR 720 near Clover

Location
- Country: United States
- State: Virginia
- Counties: Mecklenburg, Charlotte, Halifax

Highway system
- Virginia Routes; Interstate; US; Primary; Secondary; Byways; History; HOT lanes
← SR 91	→ SR 93

State Route 92 (SR 92) is a primary state highway in the U.S. state of Virginia. The state highway runs 28.97 miles (46.62 km) from U.S. Route 58 Business (US 58 Business) north and west to US 360 near Clover. SR 92 connects Boydton and Clover with Chase City via central Mecklenburg County, southern Charlotte County, and northeastern Halifax County in Southside Virginia. All of SR 92 is the former alignment of State Route 12, the predecessor to US 58.

== Route description ==
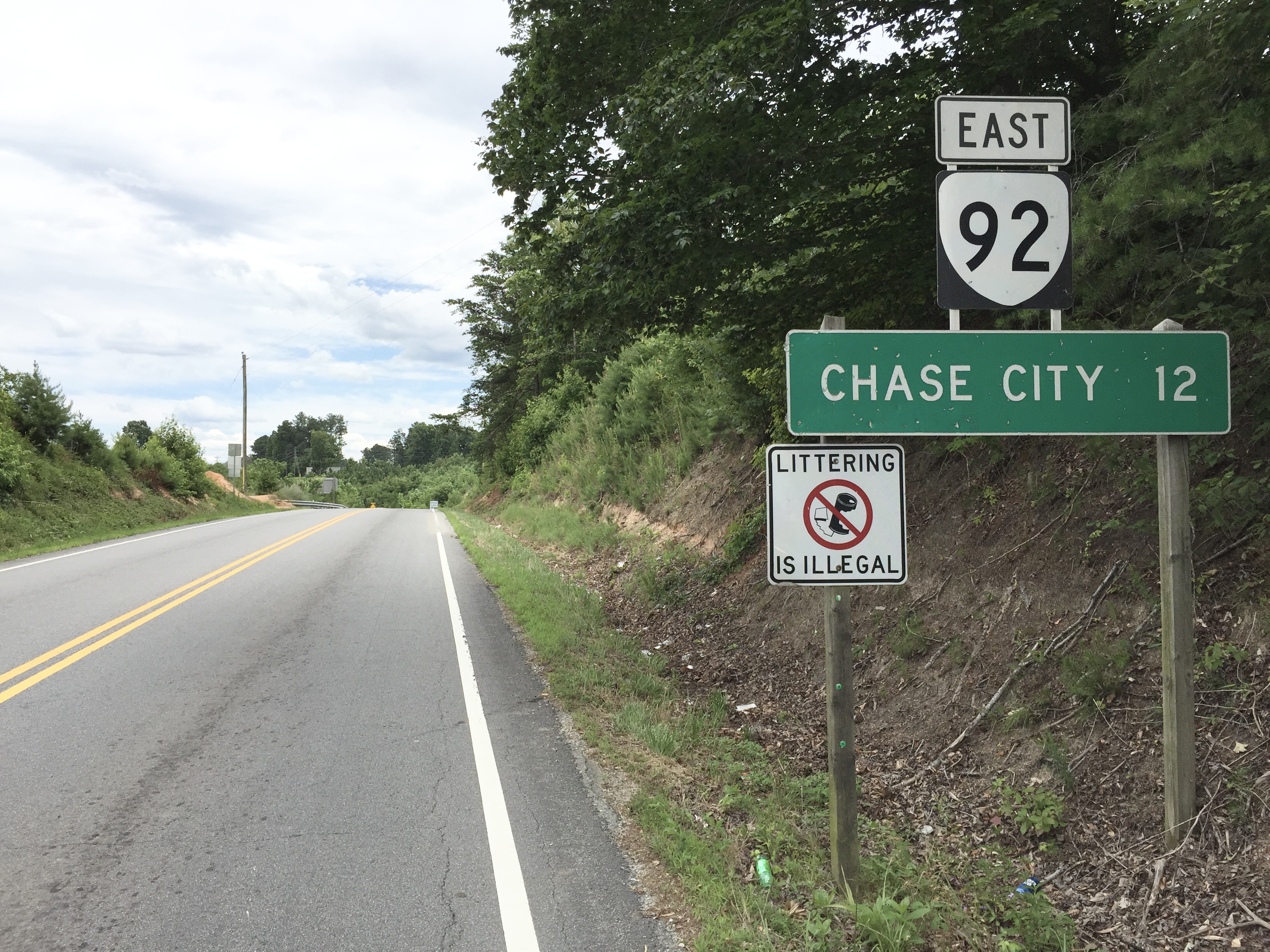
View east along SR 92 at US 360 in Public Fork

SR 92 begins at an intersection with US 58 Business (Madison Street) in Boydton, the county seat of Mecklenburg County. The state highway heads north as Washington Street to the north town limit of Boydton, where the highway intersects US 58. SR 92 heads north through a mix of farmland and forest to the town of Chase City. The state highway follows Main Street through a short jog west at Sycamore Street before meeting SR 47 and SR 49 in the center of town. SR 47 heads east on Second Street. Both SR 47 and SR 49 head north on Main Street. SR 92 and SR 49 run concurrently west from the center of town as Second Street. The two state highways diverge just east of the town limits. SR 92 heads west past Chase City Municipal Airport before entering Charlotte County. SR 92, which is named Jeb Stuart Highway within Charlotte County, intersects US 15 (Barnesville Highway) at Barnes Junction and US 360 (Kings Highway) near Public Fork before reaching the wide floodplain of the Roanoke River. SR 92's bridge over the river has been closed since 2008. The state highway continues in Halifax County as Clover Road to a Norfolk Southern Railway rail line, where the highway curves southwest and passes through the community of Clover as Main Street. Just south of Clover, SR 92 reaches its terminus at US 360 (James D. Hagood Highway).

== History ==
The full length of SR 92 was State Route 12 from 1918 to 1933. When SR 12 was eliminated in the 1933 renumbering, most of current SR 92, from US 15 at Barnes Junction east to Boydton, became State Route 46; old SR 12 west from Barnes Junction through Clover to Danville was part of US 360. In the 1940 renumbering, the State Route 46 designation was needed to match North Carolina Highway 46, and so the State Route 92 designation was applied to former SR 46 southeast of Chase City. The rest of SR 46, from Chase City west to Barnes Junction, became part of State Route 47, which continued east from Chase City to South Hill and north from Barnes Junction to Pamplin City.

In 1968, a new alignment of US 360 was under construction from near Clover to near Wylliesburg (north of Barnes Junction). SR 92 was extended west from Chase City to Barnes Junction, concurrent with SR 47, and then continuing west over old US 360 beyond Clover. The SR 47 overlap was removed in 1979 when a new alignment for SR 47 northwest from Chase City was adopted.

== Major intersections ==
County	Location	mi	km	Destinations	Notes
Halifax		28.97	46.62	US 360 (James D. Hagood Highway) / SR 720 south (Guill Town Road)	Western terminus
Halifax	Clover			SR 746 (West Church Street) – Mount Laurel, Phenix	former SR 26 north
Roanoke River bridge out
Charlotte		22.48	36.18	US 360 (Kings Highway) – Richmond, Danville, Clover	
Charlotte	Barnes Junction	18.68	30.06	US 15 (Barnesville Highway) – Wylliesburg, Clarksville	
Mecklenburg	Chase City	11.20	18.02	SR 49 south – Clarksville	west end of SR 49 overlap
Mecklenburg	Chase City	10.45	16.82	SR 47 / SR 49 north (Second Street / Main Street) – South Hill, Victoria	east end of SR 49 overlap
Mecklenburg		0.32	0.51	US 58 – South Hill, Clarksville	
Mecklenburg	Boydton	0.00	0.00	US 58 Bus. (Madison Street) / SR 707 (Washington Street)	Eastern terminus
1.000 mi = 1.609 km; 1.000 km = 0.621 mi: Closed/former; Concurrency terminus
