= Virginia State Route 49 =

State highway in southern Virginia, US

State Route 49

Route information
- Maintained by VDOT
- Length: 69.01 mi (111.06 km)
- Existed: 1928–present

Major junctions
- South end: NC 49 / NC 96 in Virgilina
- US 15 / US 58 in Clarksville; SR 47 / SR 92 in Chase City; SR 40 in Victoria; US 460 in Crewe
- North end: US 360 near Burkeville

Location
- Country: United States
- State: Virginia
- Counties: Halifax, Mecklenburg, Lunenburg, Nottoway

Highway system
- Virginia Routes; Interstate; US; Primary; Secondary; Byways; History; HOT lanes
← SR 48	→ US 50

State Route 49 (SR 49) is a primary state highway in the U.S. state of Virginia. The state highway runs 69.01 miles (111.06 km) from the North Carolina state line in Virgilina, Virginia in Halifax County, where the highway continues south as North Carolina Highway 49 (NC 49), north to U.S. Route 360 (US 360) near Burkeville in Nottoway County. SR 49 passes through Southside Virginia, connecting Virgilina and Burkeville with Clarksville and Chase City in Mecklenburg County, Victoria in Lunenburg County, and Crewe in Nottoway County. Via US 360, the state highway connects Richmond with the John H. Kerr Reservoir.

== Route description ==
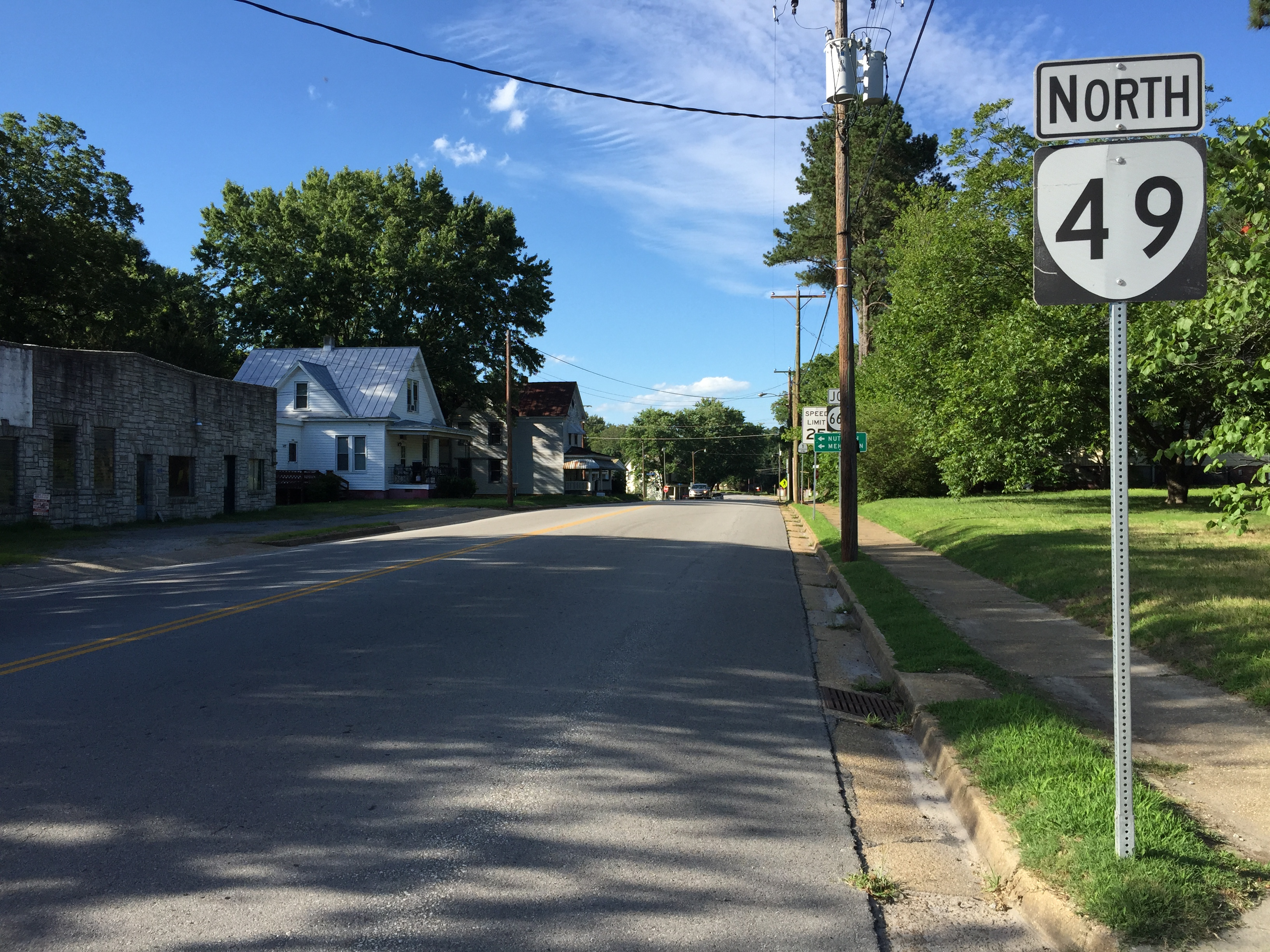
View north along SR 49 in Victoria

SR 49 begins at the North Carolina state line in the town of Virgilina in southeastern Halifax County. The state highway is concurrent with SR 96 on two-lane undivided Florence Avenue. The two highways continue into North Carolina as NC 49 and NC 96, which then split and head toward Roxboro and Oxford, respectively. The two highways cross over the old railroad grade of the Norfolk, Franklin and Danville Railway then intersect Seventh Street. SR 96 turns west toward US 501, which leads to South Boston and Halifax, the county seat of Halifax County. SR 49 turns east onto Seventh Street, leaving the town and becoming Clarksville Road, which closely parallels the state line for a short distance before veering northeast and entering Mecklenburg County after crossing Aarons Creek, which flows north into the Dan River. The state highway passes through the hamlets of Nelson and Buffalo Junction before reaching US 58.

SR 49 joins US 58, a four-lane divided highway, in a concurrency to just west of Clarksville. SR 49 heads northeast along Virginia Avenue, which also carried US 58 prior to the completion of US 58's Clarksville bypass. Virginia Avenue is a four-lane divided highway from US 58 into the town of Clarksville until just after it passes under the Virginia Southern Railroad, where the highway reduces to a two-lane undivided road and intersects US 15 (College Avenue). SR 49 and US 15 continue east concurrent into downtown Clarksville, where the highway passes through the Clarksville Historic District. After passing through the downtown area, SR 49 and US 15 leave the town of Clarksville by crossing the John H. Kerr Reservoir, an impoundment of the Roanoke River that is also known as Buggs Island Lake, on the Phillip Saint Julian Wilson Bridge and a causeway. The bridge, which contains lights underneath used for nighttime fishing, includes a brief passage through Halifax County due to the thalwegs of the Roanoke and Dan Rivers, which were used to set the county boundaries, converging just south of Clarksville. At the east end of the causeway, access to US 58 is provided at a four-way intersection. Ramps to US 58 west and US 58 east form the southern and eastern legs of the intersection, which mainline US 58 avoids via a pair of flyover ramps just east of its bridge over the reservoir. SR 49 and US 15 turn north, cross over the Virginia Southern rail line, and parallel the eastern shore of the lake until the two highways split at the hamlet of Dortch Store.

SR 49 heads northeast, crossing Goodell Creek, Little Bluestone Creek, and Woodpecker Creek and passing through the hamlet of Jones Store before reaching Chase City. Just inside the town limits, SR 49 joins SR 92 in a concurrency on Second Street while crossing Little Bluestone Creek again. In the center of town, the two highways cross over the Virginia Southern rail line and intersect Main Street. SR 92 heads south toward Boydton on Main Street, SR 47 heads east on Second Street toward South Hill, and SR 49 turns north onto Main Street to join SR 47 in a concurrency. At the north end of town, SR 47 splits to the northwest while SR 49 veers northeast, where the highway crosses the Meherrin River on the Tucker Mill Bridge into Lunenburg County. The state highway gains the name Courthouse Road, which it carries as it bridges the Middle Meherrin River and North Meherrin River and passes through the county seat of Lunenburg, where SR 40 (Lunenburg County Road) joins the highway in a concurrency northeast to the town of Victoria. SR 49 and SR 40 enter the town as Court Street, crossing the former right-of-way of the Norfolk, Franklin and Danville Railway before reaching Main Street. SR 40 turns south toward Kenbridge while SR 49 turns north then veers northeast onto Nottoway Boulevard.

SR 49 leaves Victoria as The Falls Road, named for the cataract where the state highway crosses the Nottoway River into Nottoway County. The state highway is also named Earle Davis Gregory Highway, named for Earle Davis Gregory, a World War I Medal of Honor recipient. At the river, SR 49 turns north, crossing Whetstone Creek and the Little Nottoway River before reaching the town of Crewe. The state highway crosses over Norfolk Southern Railway's Norfolk District just east of a rail yard. SR 49 turns northwest onto Virginia Avenue, where the highway joins US 460 in a concurrency. The two highways become West Virginia Avenue outside of the downtown area and parallel the rail yard to the west end of town, where SR 49 turns north onto Watsons Wood Road. SR 49 crosses Deep Creek before reaching its northern terminus at US 360 (Patrick Henry Highway) northeast of Burkeville.

== History ==
State Route 49 (SR 49) underwent significant changes to its alignment and designation during Virgina's early highway development. Before the 1940 state highway renumbering, the route extended considerably farther than its present-day alignment, running north from Burkeville through central Virginia, all the way to Flint Hill in Rappahannock County. Its southern terminus was also farther west, extending from Virgilina to U.S. Route 501 (US 501) in Halifax County. This earlier alignment connected communities across several regions of the state and formed part of a substantially longer north-south highway corridor.

A major reconstruction occurred in October 1940, when the Virginia State Highway Commission approved a statewide renumbering and realignment of several primary highways. The changes to SR 49 shortened the route at both ends and established an alignment more closely coordinated with North Carolina's highway system. The northern portion was truncated to Burkeville, while the southern portion was shortened to Virgilina and extended to the North Carolina state line, where it connected with North Carolina Highway 49 (NC 49). The revised route description followed a corridor through Victoria, Lunenburg, Chase City, and Clarksville before reaching the state line.

The former northern alignment of SR 49 was divided among several highways during the renumbering. Much of the former route between Burkeville area and Culpeper was incorporated into the planned extension of U.S. Route 522 (US 522) into Virginia. The section between Burkeville and the vicinity of Powhatan that was not concurrent with other routes became an extension of State Route 38 (SR 38), while the former northern segment north of Culpeper toward Flint Hill was redesignated as part of State Route 242 (SR 242). At the southern end, the former extension west of Virgilina to US 501 was redesignated as State Route 96 (SR 96). These changes eliminated much of SR 49's former alignment while redistributing its mileage among several states and U.S. highways.

The 1940 renumbering also reflected a broader effort to improve consistency in highway numbering across state boundaries. North Carolina extended NC 49 northward to the Virginia state line, allowing Virginia to align SR 49 with its neighboring state's twin designation.

The corridor largely remains the same, albeit there have been subsequent local realignments and modified portions of the route.

== Major intersections ==
County	Location	mi	km	Destinations	Notes
Halifax	Virgilina	0.00	0.00	NC 49 south / NC 96 south – Roxboro, Oxford	North Carolina state line; southern terminus; southern end of SR 96 concurrency
Halifax	Virgilina	0.13	0.21	SR 96 west (Seventh Street) / SR 734 (Florence Avenue) to US 501 – South Boston	Northern end of SR 96 concurrency
Mecklenburg	Sandy Fork	11.29	18.17	US 58 west – South Boston	Southern end of US 58 concurrency
Mecklenburg	Puryear Corner	345.64	556.25	US 58 Bus. east – Clarksville, Town of Clarksville Historic District	
Mecklenburg	Clarksville	347.10	558.60	US 15 – Clarksville, Oxford, NC	interchange
Mecklenburg	Clarksville	15.79	25.41	US 58 east / US 58 Bus. west – Clarksville, Boydton, South Hill, Occoneechee State Park	interchange; north end of US 58 overlap
Mecklenburg		17.39	27.99	US 15 north – Farmville	Northern end of US 15 concurrency
Mecklenburg	Chase City	29.50	47.48	SR 92 west – Charlotte CH	Southern end of SR 92 concurrency
Mecklenburg	Chase City	30.25	48.68	SR 47 south / SR 92 east – South Hill, Boydton	Northern end of SR 92 concurrency; southern end of SR 47 concurrency
Mecklenburg	Chase City	31.51	50.71	SR 47 west to US 360 – Charlotte CH, Pamplin City	Northern end of SR 47 concurrency
Lunenburg	Lunenburg	46.74	75.22	SR 40 west (Lunenburg County Road) – Keysville	Southern end of SR 40 concurrency
Lunenburg	Victoria			SR 40 Truck east / SR 49 Truck north / SR 1024 (Tidewater Avenue)	
Lunenburg	Victoria	50.13	80.68	SR 40 east / SR 49 Truck south (Main Street) / SR 1002 (8th Street) – Kenbridge, trucks to SR 40 west	Northern end of SR 40 concurrency
Lunenburg				SR 723 (Burkeville Road) – Burkeville	former SR 49 north
Nottoway	Crewe	65.32	105.12	US 460 east (East Virginia Avenue) – Blackstone, Petersburg	Southern end of US 460 concurrency
Nottoway	Crewe	67.12	108.02	US 460 west (West Virginia Avenue) – Burkeville	Northern end of US 460 concurrency
Nottoway		69.01	111.06	US 360 (Patrick Henry Highway) – Burkeville, Danville, Amelia, Richmond	Northern terminus
1.000 mi = 1.609 km; 1.000 km = 0.621 mi: Concurrency terminus

== SR 49 Truck ==
State Route 49 Truck
- Location: Victoria

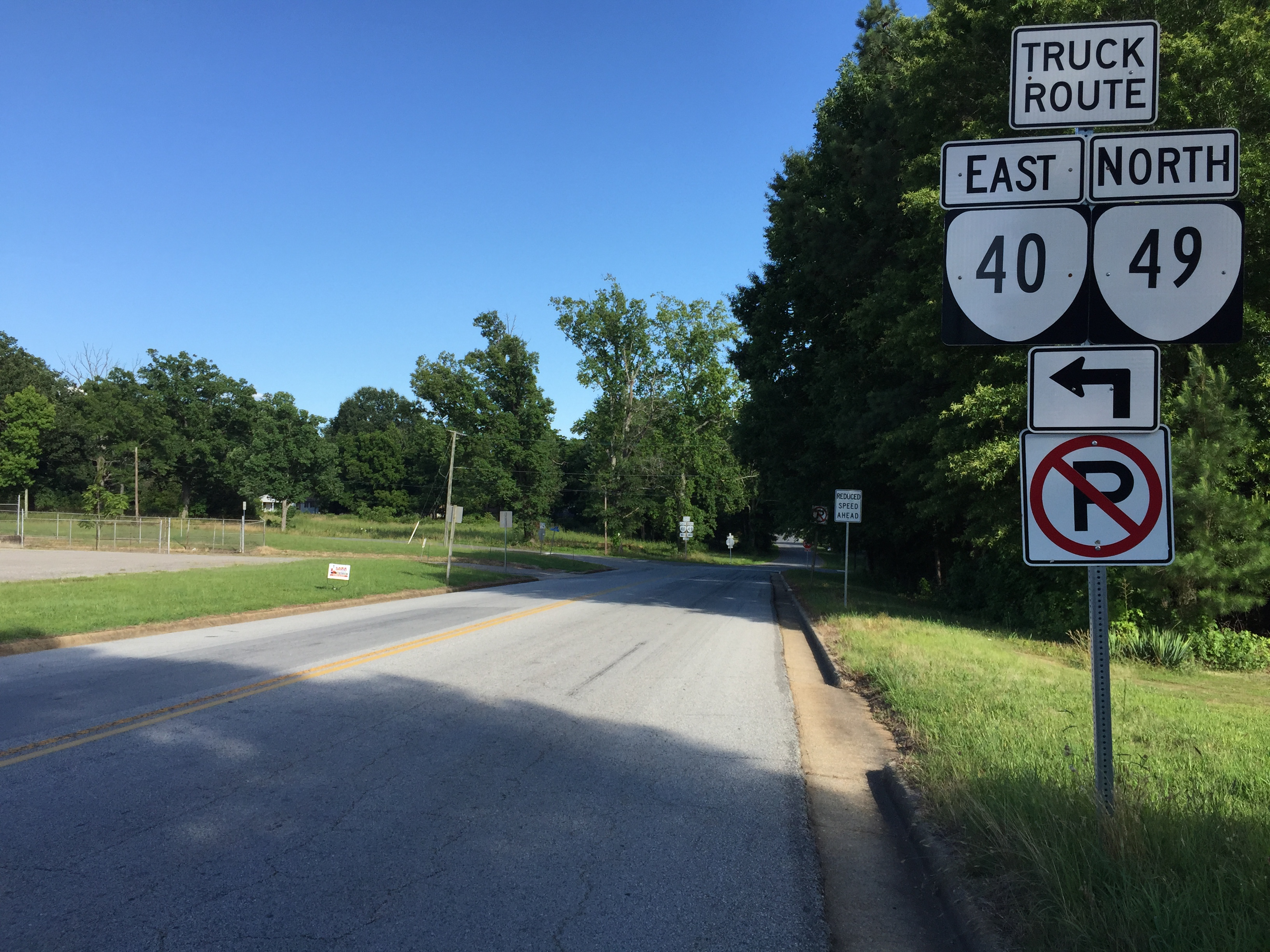
SR 40 Truck and SR 49 Truck in Victoria

Virginia State Truck Route 49 in Victoria, Virginia starts out overlapped with Virginia State Route 40 Truck, following Tidewater Avenue from Court Street to West 6th Street, Railroad Avenue from Tidewater Avenue and West 6th Street to Main Street, and First Avenue. From there it turns north onto Main Street in another overlap, this time with Virginia State Route 40, and terminates at the east end of the VA 40/49 overlap.

< SR 43	Two‑digit State Routes; 1923-1933	SR 45 >
< SR 48	Two‑digit State Routes; 1923-1933	SR 50 >
< SR 58	Two‑digit State Routes; 1923-1933	none
none	Spurs of SR 20; 1923–1928	SR 202 >
