= Interstate 85 in Virginia =

Section of Interstate Highway in Virginia, United States

Interstate 85

Route information
- Maintained by VDOT
- Length: 68.64 mi (110.47 km)
- NHS: Entire route

Major junctions
- South end: I-85 at the North Carolina state line near Bracey
- US 58 in South Hill; US 1 near South Hill; SR 46 near Alberta; SR 40 near McKenney; US 460 near Petersburg
- North end: I-95 / US 460 in Petersburg

Location
- Country: United States
- State: Virginia
- Counties: Mecklenburg, Brunswick, Dinwiddie, City of Petersburg

Highway system
- Interstate Highway System; Main; Auxiliary; Suffixed; Business; Future; Virginia Routes; Interstate; US; Primary; Secondary; Byways; History; HOT lanes
← SR 84	→ SR 86

Interstate 85 (I-85) is a part of the Interstate Highway System that runs from Montgomery, Alabama, to Petersburg, Virginia. In Virginia, the Interstate Highway runs 68.64 miles (110.47 km) from the North Carolina state line near Bracey north to I-95 in Petersburg. I-85 passes through the eastern part of Southside, where it parallels US Route 1 (US 1) from Petersburg, where the highway runs concurrently with US 460, to south of South Hill, where the highway intersects Southside's major east–west highway, US 58. The Interstate Highway is the primary connection between the Greater Richmond Region and Research Triangle and other major metropolitan areas of North Carolina. Like all mainline Interstate Highways, I-85 is a part of the National Highway System for its entire length in Virginia.

== Route description ==
I-85 enters Virginia in Mecklenburg County southwest of Bracey. The Interstate Highway continues southwest toward Henderson and Durham. Northbound I-85 has a welcome center before the highway crosses Lake Gaston, an impoundment of the Roanoke River, on a causeway and bridge before reaching an interchange with State Route 903 (SR 903) at Bracey. The freeway passes through the town of South Hill, where the highway has a cloverleaf interchange with US 58 (Atlantic Avenue). US 58 serves as the major east–west highway of Southside; the US Route provides access to La Crosse, Brodnax, Lawrenceville, and Emporia to the east and Boydton and Clarksville to the west. US 58 leads to SR 47, which provides access to Chase City. North of the town of South Hill, I-85 has a junction with US 1 (Mecklenburg Avenue), which parallels the Interstate Highway from Henderson to Petersburg. The US 1 interchange also provides access to SR 138, which heads north toward Kenbridge.

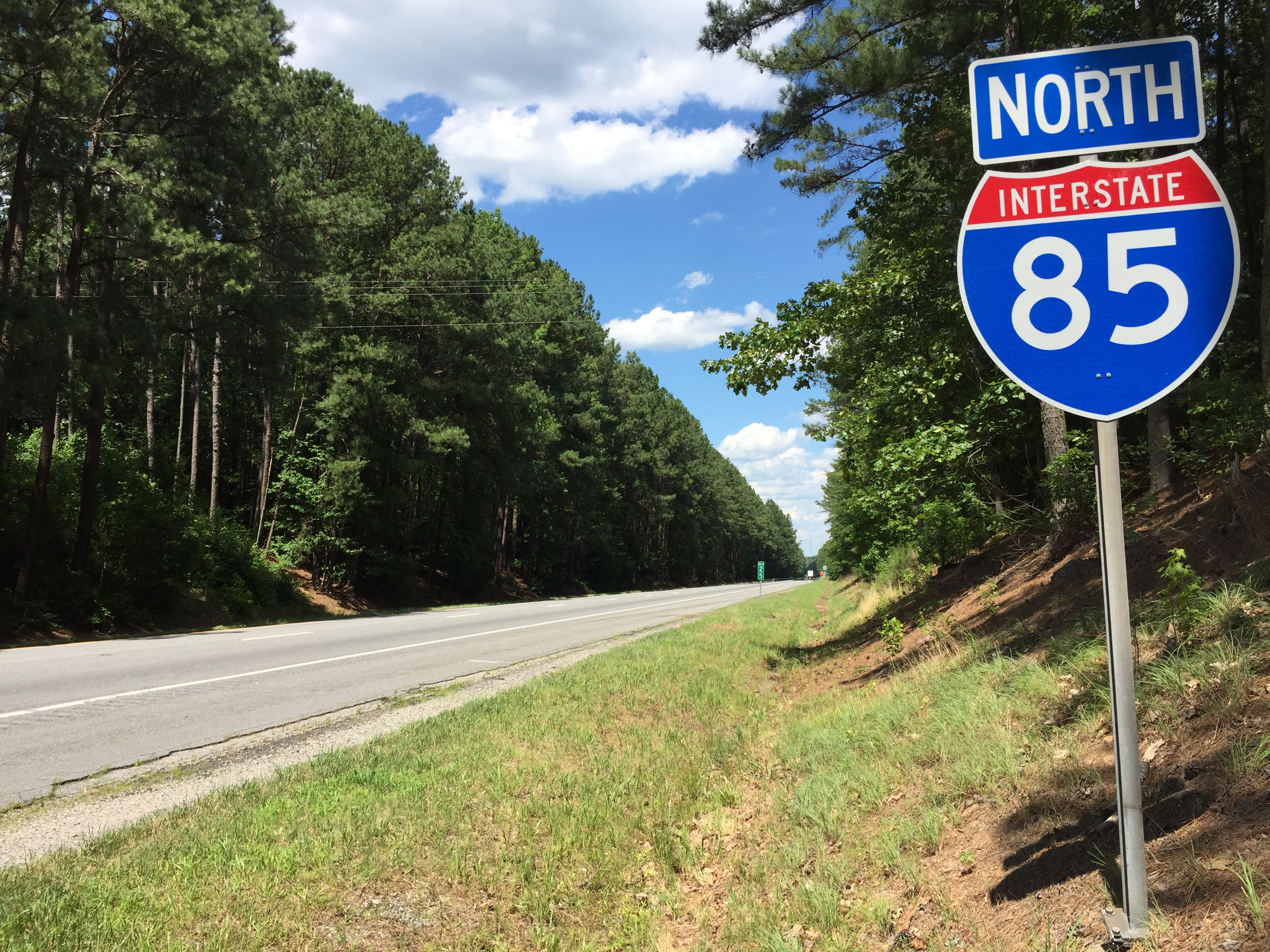
View north along I-85 north of the SR 644 exit in Brunswick County

North of US 1, I-85 enters Brunswick County just before the highway crosses the Meherrin River. The Interstate Highway has an interchange with SR 644 (Brunswick Drive) at Meredithville and a partial interchange with SR 46 (Christanna Highway) before the freeway crosses to the east side of US 1 (Boydton Plank Road) at an interchange southwest of the town of Alberta. The SR 46 and US 1 interchanges provide access to St. Paul's College in Lawrenceville and the Christanna campus of Southside Virginia Community College at the US 1/SR 46 intersection. Northeast of Alberta, I-85 has rest areas in both directions and interchanges with SR 630 (Sturgeon Road) at Sturgeonville and SR 712 (Old Stage Road) near Rawlings.

I-85 crosses the Nottoway River into Dinwiddie County southwest of its interchanges with SR 40 (McKenney Highway) near the town of McKenney and SR 650 (Hamilton Arms Road) at DeWitt. The Interstate Highway serves Dinwiddie via its partial cloverleaf interchange with SR 703 (Carson Road) just east of the county seat of Dinwiddie County and another pair of rest areas. The Dinwiddie interchange and the following interchange with US 460 (Cox Road) provide access to Virginia Motorsports Park. At the partial cloverleaf interchange with US 460, which also leads to Dinwiddie County Airport, the Interstate Highway and US Route start to run concurrently toward Petersburg. Both the US 460 interchange and the following partial cloverleaf junction with US 1 (Boydton Plank Road) provide access to the National Museum of the Civil War Soldier at Pamplin Historical Park. East of US 1, the freeway curves to the east and changes from having a wide, forested median to a Jersey barrier separating the twin carriageways.

I-85 enters the city of Petersburg prior to its junction with Squirrel Level Road. South of downtown Petersburg, I-85 reaches its northern terminus at a trumpet interchange with I-95. The southern end of the interchange has a ramp from northbound I-85 to southbound I-95. Here, US 460 joins I-95 south through an interchange with US 301 (Crater Road), south of which the US Route separates from I-95 on its way to Norfolk. I-85 curves north and merges with I-95 in the direction of Richmond adjacent to the loop ramp from northbound I-95 to southbound I-85. Just before merging with northbound I-95, I-85 has its final exit, a ramp that leads to the one-way pair of eastbound Wythe Street and westbound Washington Street in Historic Old Towne Petersburg. Wythe Street leads to Petersburg National Battlefield; Fort Gregg-Adams, which contains the US Army Quartermaster Museum and US Army Women's Museum; and the city of Hopewell via SR 36.

== Exit list ==
County	Location	mi	km	Exit	Destinations	Notes
Mecklenburg		0.00	0.00		I-85 south – Durham	North Carolina state line
Mecklenburg	Bracey	4.23	6.81	4	SR 903 – Bracey, Lake Gaston	
Mecklenburg	South Hill	12.62	20.31	12	US 58 to SR 47 – South Hill, Chase City, Emporia, Norfolk	signed as exits 12A (east) and 12B (west)
Mecklenburg	South Hill	15.34	24.69	15	US 1 – South Hill, Kenbridge	
Brunswick	Meredithville	24.08	38.75	24	SR 644 – Meredithville	
Brunswick		27.09	43.60	27	SR 46 – Blackstone, Lawrenceville	Northbound exit and southbound entrance
Brunswick		28.28	45.51	28	US 1 to SR 46 – Alberta, Lawrenceville	
Brunswick	Sturgeonville	34.67	55.80	34	SR 630 – Warfield	
Brunswick		39.38	63.38	39	SR 712 – Rawlings	former SR 140
Dinwiddie		42.52	68.43	42	SR 40 – McKenney	
Dinwiddie	DeWitt	48.47	78.00	48	SR 650 – DeWitt	
Dinwiddie	Dinwiddie	53.35	85.86	53	SR 703 – Dinwiddie	former SR 141
Dinwiddie		61.87	99.57	61	US 460 west (US 460 Bus. east) – Blackstone, Lynchburg	south end of US 460 overlap
Dinwiddie		63.64	102.42	63	US 1	signed as exits 63A (south) and 63B (north); former southern terminus of the Richmond–Petersburg Turnpike
City of Petersburg		65.83	105.94	65	Squirrel Level Road	
City of Petersburg		68.40	110.08	68	I-95 south / US 460 east – Rocky Mount, NC, Norfolk	north end of US 460 overlap; northbound exit and southbound entrance
City of Petersburg		68.40	110.08	69	Wythe Street / Washington Street (US 460 Bus.) – Historic Old Towne Petersburg	Northbound exit and southbound entrance
City of Petersburg		68.40	110.08		I-95 north – Richmond	Northbound exit and southbound entrance; northern terminus; I-95 exit 51
1.000 mi = 1.609 km; 1.000 km = 0.621 mi: Concurrency terminus; Incomplete access

Interstate 85
Previous state: North Carolina	Virginia	Next state: Terminus
