= Virginia State Route 47 =

State highway in southern Virginia, US

State Route 47

Route information
- Maintained by VDOT
- Length: 61.09 mi (98.31 km)
- Existed: July 1, 1933–present
- Tourist routes: Virginia Byway

Major junctions
- East end: US 1 / US 58 Bus. in South Hill
- US 15 / US 360 at Crafton Gate; SR 40 at Charlotte Court House
- North end: US 460 Bus. in Pamplin City

Location
- Country: United States
- State: Virginia
- Counties: Mecklenburg, Charlotte, Prince Edward, Appomattox

Highway system
- Virginia Routes; Interstate; US; Primary; Secondary; Byways; History; HOT lanes
← SR 46	→ US 48

State Route 47 (SR 47) is a primary state highway in the U.S. state of Virginia. The state highway runs 61.09 miles (98.31 km) from U.S. Route 1 (US 1) and US 58 Business in South Hill north to US 460 Business in Pamplin City, Virginia. SR 47 passes through Southside Virginia, where the highway connects the towns of Chase City in Mecklenburg County and Drakes Branch and Charlotte Court House in Charlotte County.

The entire length of SR 47 is a Virginia Byway.

== Route description ==
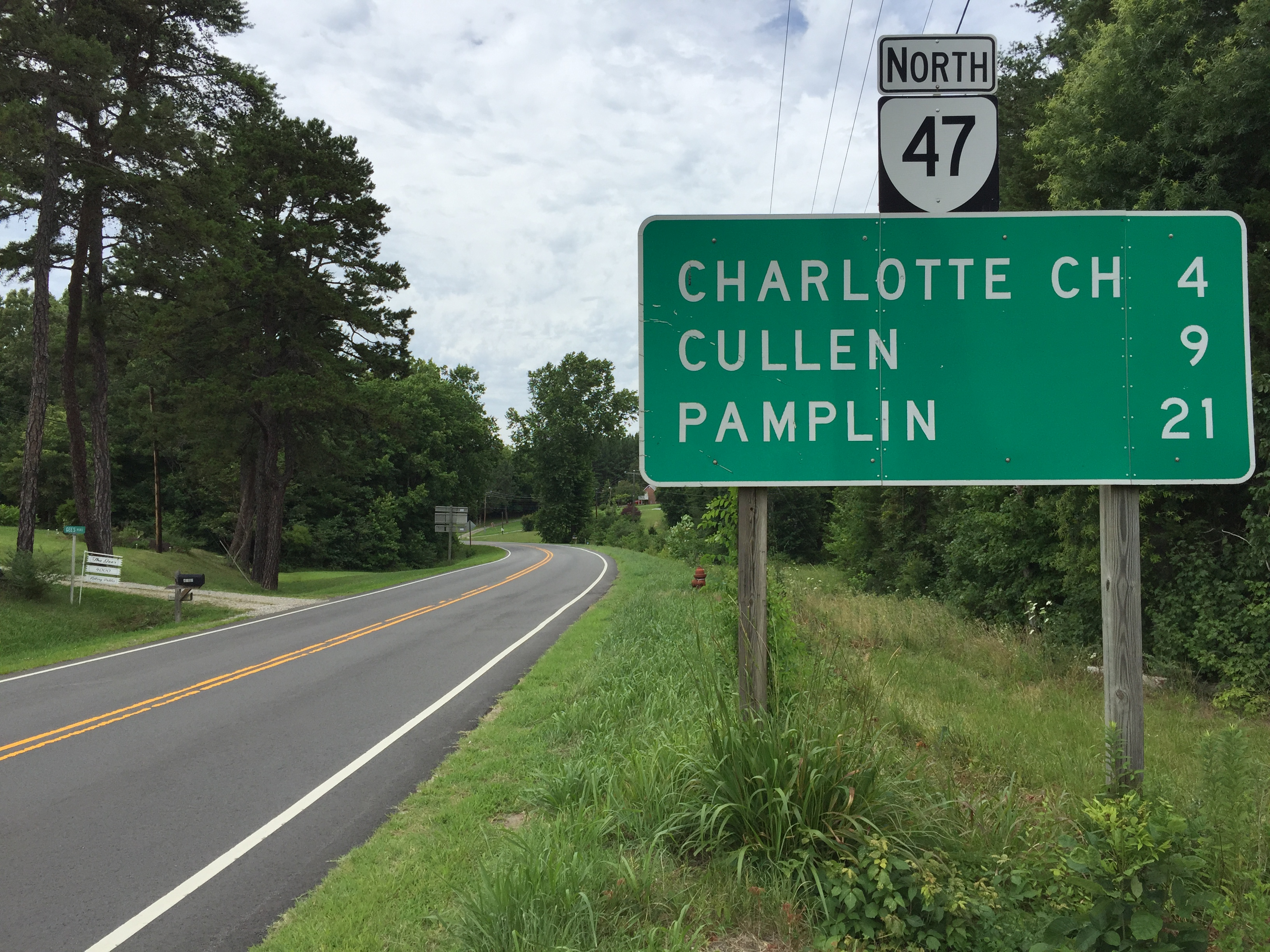
View north along SR 47 in Drakes Branch

SR 47 begins at the intersection of Mecklenburg Avenue and Atlantic Street in the center of South Hill. Mecklenburg Avenue heads north as US 1 and south as US 1 and US 58 Business. US 58 Business also heads east on Atlantic Street. SR 47 heads west as Atlantic Street to the western town limit of South Hill. The state highway passes through several small communities, including North View, Wightman, and Drapersville, as it traverses northern Mecklenburg County on top of the drainage divide between the Meherrin River to the north and the Roanoke River to the south. SR 47 enters the town of Chase City as Second Street. In the center of town, Second Street intersects Main Street. Second Street continues west as SR 49 and SR 92. SR 92 heads south on Main Street, while SR 47 turns north and runs concurrently with SR 49 to the north town limit. There, SR 49 continues north toward Victoria while SR 47 turns northwest, again closely following the drainage divide.

SR 47 continues into Charlotte County as Craftons Gate Highway, named for the hamlet where the state highway intersects US 15 and US 360 (Kings Highway). The highway continues north and serves as Main Street in the town of Drakes Branch, where the highway crosses Twittys Creek and meets the western end of SR 59 (Gethsemane Church Avenue). SR 47 leaves the town as Tollhouse Highway and crosses Roanoke Creek before reaching Charlotte Court House. The state highway enters the county seat as Lagrande Avenue and has a very short concurrency with SR 40, which follows David Bruce Avenue to the west and George Washington Highway to the east. SR 47 exits Charlotte Court House as Thomas Jefferson Highway. The highway crosses over Norfolk Southern Railway's Altavista District rail line at the hamlet of Cullen. At County Line Road, SR 47 begins to follow the boundary between Charlotte and Prince Edward counties. The state highway has brief stretches entirely within one of the counties before continuing to serve as the county line as the highway closely parallels Norfolk Southern's Blue Ridge District. SR 47's path along the county line ends when the highway enters Appomattox County just south of the town of Pamplin City, where the Blue Ridge District merges with the Farmville Belt Line coming from the east. The state highway passes under the two railroad tracks just before reaching its northern terminus at US 460 Business. US 460 Business connects with US 460, which heads east toward Farmville and west toward Appomattox.

== Major intersections ==
County	Location	mi	km	Destinations	Notes
Mecklenburg	South Hill	0.00	0.00	US 1 / US 58 Bus. (Mecklenburg Avenue / East Atlantic Street) to I-85	Southern terminus
Mecklenburg	Chase City	21.63	34.81	SR 49 south / SR 92 (East 2nd Street / North Main Street) – Boydton	Southern end of SR 49 concurrency
Mecklenburg	Chase City	22.89	36.84	SR 49 north – Victoria	Northern end of SR 49 concurrency
Charlotte	Crafton Gate	31.13	50.10	US 15 / US 360 (Kings Highway) – South Boston, Danville, Keysville, Richmond	
Charlotte	Drakes Branch	39.77	64.00	SR 59 north (Gethsemane Church Avenue) / SR 637 west (Saxkey Road) – Saxe, Keysville	Southern terminus of SR 59
Charlotte	Charlotte Court House	44.04	70.88	SR 40 west (David Bruce Avenue) – Rocky Mount	Southern end of SR 40 concurrency
Charlotte	Charlotte Court House	44.14	71.04	SR 40 east (George Washington Highway)	Northern end of SR 40 concurrency
Appomattox	Pamplin City	61.09	98.31	US 460 Bus. (Pamplin Road) – Appomattox, Farmville	Northern terminus
1.000 mi = 1.609 km; 1.000 km = 0.621 mi: Concurrency terminus

< SR 201	Spurs of SR 20; 1923–1928	none
< SR 303	District 3 State Routes; 1928–1933	SR 305 >
< SR 433	District 4 State Routes; 1928–1933	SR 435 >
