= Virginia State Route 59 =

State highway in Charlotte County, Virginia, US

State Route 59

Route information
- Maintained by VDOT
- Length: 7.90 mi (12.71 km)
- Existed: 1957–present

Major junctions
- South end: SR 47 / SR 637 in Drakes Branch
- North end: SR 40 in Keysville

Location
- Country: United States
- State: Virginia
- Counties: Charlotte

Highway system
- Virginia Routes; Interstate; US; Primary; Secondary; Byways; History; HOT lanes
← US 58	→ US 60

State Route 59 (SR 59) is a primary state highway in the U.S. state of Virginia. The state highway runs 7.90 miles (12.71 km) from SR 47 in Drakes Branch east to SR 40 in Keysville within eastern Charlotte County.

== Route description ==
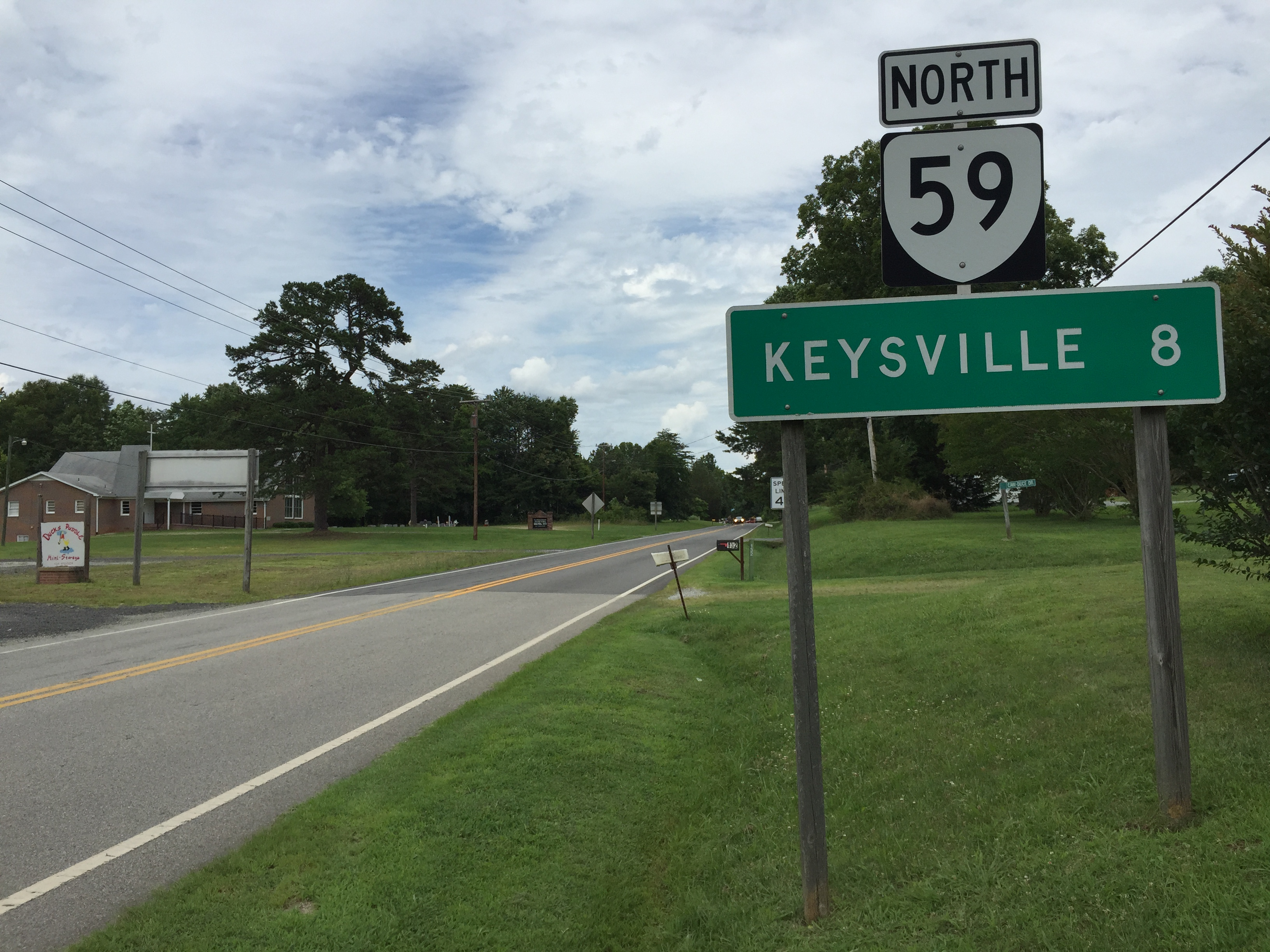
View north along SR 59 at SR 47 and SR 637 in Drakes Branch

SR 59 begins at an intersection with SR 47 (Main Street) in the northern part of the town of Drakes Branch opposite Saxkey Road. The state highway heads northeast from SR 47 as Gethsemane Church Avenue, then becomes unnamed after leaving the town limits. SR 59 follows the height of land between Twittys Creek to the south and Ash Camp Creek to the north; both streams empty into Roanoke Creek west of Drakes Branch. The state highway begins to parallel a Norfolk Southern Railway rail line as it approaches Keysville. SR 59 enters the town of Keysville as Merry Oaks Drive then reaches its northern terminus at SR 40 (Church Street) west of downtown Keysville.

== History ==
Until 1957, when it was transferred from the secondary system, SR 59 was State Route 657. The number 657 is now used on Bradner Road, a minor 0.8-mile (1.3 km) dead-end street off SR 649 east of Phenix.

== Major intersections ==
The entire route is in Charlotte County.

Location	mi	km	Destinations	Notes
Drakes Branch	0.00	0.00	SR 47 (North Main Street) / SR 637 west (Saxkey Road) – Chase City, Charlotte CH	Southern terminus
Keysville	7.90	12.71	SR 40 (Church Street)	Northern terminus
1.000 mi = 1.609 km; 1.000 km = 0.621 mi
