= Virginia State Route 40 =

State highway in southern Virginia, US

State Route 40

Route information
- Maintained by VDOT
- Length: 227.689 mi (366.430 km)
- Existed: July 1, 1933–present
- Tourist routes: Virginia Byway

Major junctions
- West end: SR 8 at Woolwine
- US 220 in Rocky Mount; US 29 near Gretna; US 501 in Brookneal; US 15 / US 360 near Keysville; US 1 in McKenney; I-85 near McKenney; US 301 in Stony Creek; I-95 near Stony Creek; US 460 in Waverly
- East end: SR 10 / SR 646 at Spring Grove

Location
- Country: United States
- State: Virginia
- Counties: Patrick, Franklin, Pittsylvania, Halifax, Campbell, Charlotte, Lunenburg, Nottoway, Dinwiddie, Sussex, Surry

Highway system
- Virginia Routes; Interstate; US; Primary; Secondary; Byways; History; HOT lanes
← SR 39	→ SR 41

State Route 40 (SR 40) is a primary state highway in the southern part of the U.S. state of Virginia. It runs from SR 8 at Woolwine east to SR 10 at Spring Grove, about half the width of Virginia. It is the longest state-numbered (not U.S. or Interstate) route in Virginia.

== Route description ==
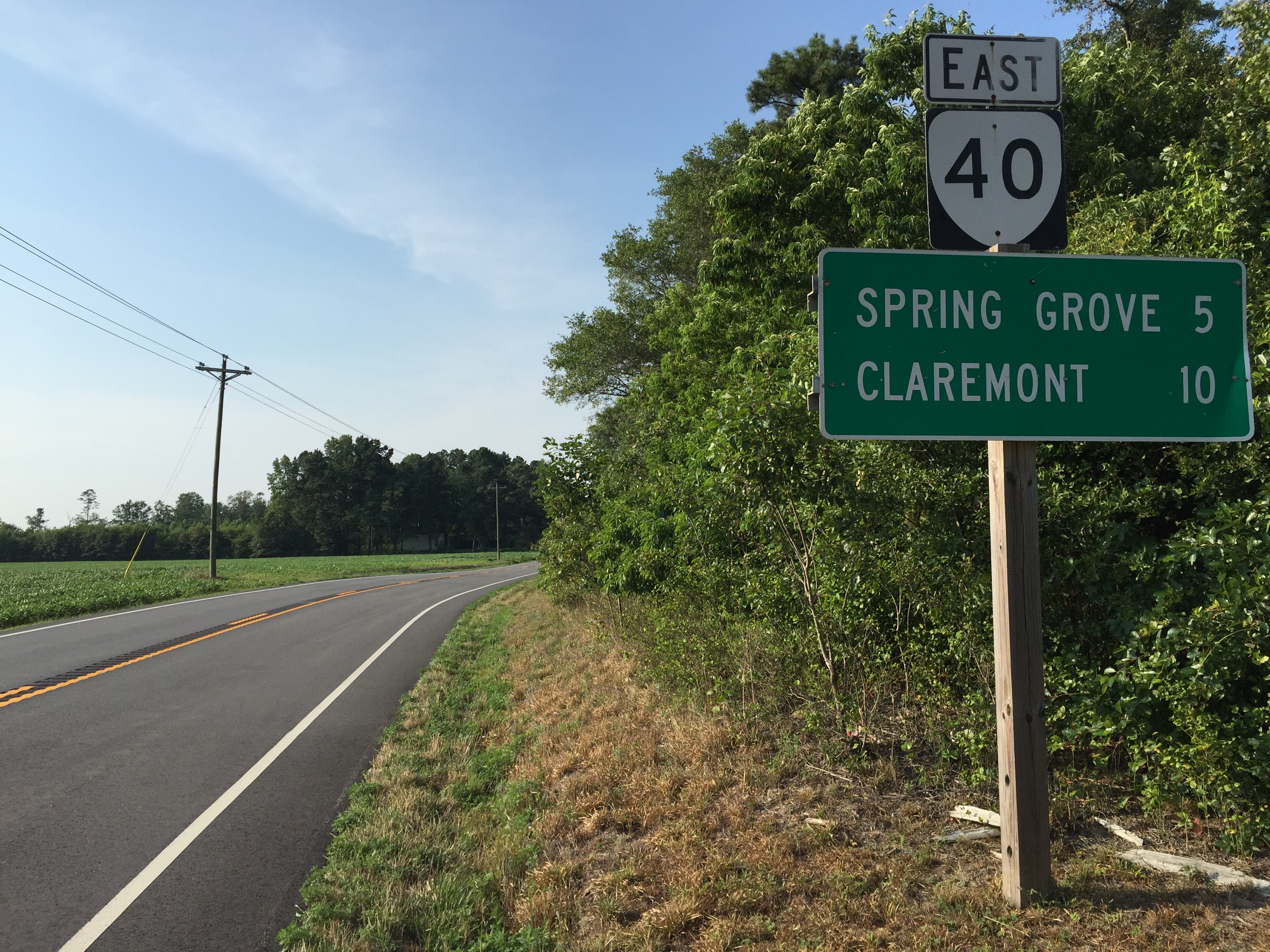
View east along SR 40 in Surry County

SR 40 begins at SR 8 at the small community of Woolwine. It heads northeast along the eastern side of the Blue Ridge, crossing streams and foothills via a curving route. Around Endicott, the highway starts to turn east, away from the ridge, and straightens out as the terrain becomes flatter. Between Ferrum and Rocky Mount, SR 40 parallels the Norfolk Southern Railway's north–south Winston-Salem District. The route intersects U.S. Route 220 Business (US 220 Business) in downtown Rocky Mount and the newer US 220 bypass to the east, soon splitting from SR 122, which leads northeast to Bedford, and turning directly east. After it leaves Rocky Mount, SR 40 heads east, largely along a newer alignment that utilizes cuts and fills to provide a straight and level path. Approaching Gretna, it intersects the US 29 bypass, and then US 29 Business in downtown Gretna. This portion of the highway ends where it meets US 501 at North Halifax, turning north and crossing the Roanoke River into Brookneal.

US 501 and SR 40 split in downtown Brookneal, with US 501 heading northwest and SR 40 leaving to the northeast, but soon turning east. The highway passes through Phenix on its way to Charlotte Court House, where it intersects SR 47 with a brief overlap. Inside Keysville, SR 40 meets the north end of SR 59 and crosses US 15/360 Business, and then crosses the US 15/US 360 bypass outside the town limits. Just beyond, the short SR 385 provides access to Southside Virginia Community College. SR 40 joins SR 49 at Lunenburg, overlapping that route to downtown Victoria. From Victoria east to downtown Kenbridge, where it meets the west and north ends of SR 137 and SR 138, SR 40 parallels the abandoned Virginian Railway. The route leaves Kenbridge to the northeast, running past the north end of SR 46 to a junction with US 460 Business in downtown Blackstone.

After a short overlap with US 460 Business, SR 40 leaves to the east, while the business route continues northeast back to US 460. Because SR 40 is south of US 460 Business on both sides of the overlap, SR 40 does not intersect US 460 here. Outside the town limits, SR 40 crosses through Fort Barfoot. The route crosses US 1 in McKenney and I-85 at exit 42 just to the east. After bypassing Stony Creek to the south, SR 40 crosses US 301 and I-95 at exit 31; a short State Route 40 Business follows the original route through Stony Creek, returning to SR 40 on the east end via a short overlap with US 301. Between Sussex and a point east of Homeville (where SR 40 crosses SR 35), a secondary route to the south is the former alignment, now named Old Forty Road. Beyond Homeville, the last stretch of the highway heads northeasterly, crossing US 460 in Waverly before ending at SR 10 at Spring Grove. State Route 646, a secondary highway, continues northeast beyond SR 10 to the former end of SR 40 in Claremont.

== Major intersections ==
County	Location	mi	km	Destinations	Notes
Patrick	Woolwine	0.000	0.000	SR 8 (Woolwine Highway) – Stuart, Floyd	Western terminus
Franklin				SR 860 (Shooting Creek Road)	former SR 109 west
Franklin	Ferrum			SR 602 (Ferrum Mountain Road) – Speedway, Callaway	former SR 245 north
Franklin	Rocky Mount	32.078	51.625	US 220 Bus. north (North Main Street)	Western end of US 220 Bus. concurrency
Franklin	Rocky Mount	32.108	51.673	US 220 Bus. south (North Main Street)	Eastern end of US 220 Bus. concurrency
Franklin	Rocky Mount	33.170– 33.325	53.382– 53.631	US 220 – Roanoke, Martinsville	interchange
Franklin	Rocky Mount	34.251	55.122	SR 122 north (Booker T. Washington Highway) – Smith Mountain Lake, Bedford, Booker T. Washington National Monument, Smith Mountain Lake State Park	Southern terminus of SR 122
Franklin	Penhook			SR 890 (Snow Creek Road) – Martinsville	former SR 108 south
Pittsylvania		63.365– 63.506	101.976– 102.203	US 29 – Lynchburg, Danville	interchange
Pittsylvania	Gretna	64.481	103.772	US 29 Bus. (Main Street) – Lynchburg, Danville	
Halifax	Cody			SR 603 (Cody Road) – Republican Grove, Volens	former SR 126 south
Halifax	North Halifax	89.645	144.270	US 501 south (L.P. Bailey Highway) / SR 632 east (Hog Wallow Road) – Halifax, South Boston	Western end of US 501 concurrency
Campbell	Brookneal	91.459	147.189	US 501 north (Lynchburg Avenue) – Lynchburg	Eastern end of US 501 concurrency
Charlotte	Phenix			SR 727 / SR 1008 (Washington Avenue) – Red House, Appomattox	former SR 26 north
Charlotte				SR 746 (Scuffletown Road) – Clover	former SR 26 south
Charlotte	Charlotte Court House	110.884	178.451	SR 47 south (Legrande Avenue)	Western end of SR 47 concurrency
Charlotte	Charlotte Court House	110.991	178.623	SR 47 north (Thomas Jefferson Highway) – Pamplin City	Eastern end of SR 47 concurrency
Charlotte	Keysville	119.908	192.973	SR 59 south (Merry Oaks Drive) – Drakes Branch	Northern terminus of SR 59
Charlotte	Keysville	120.028	193.166	US 15 Bus. north / US 360 Bus. east / SR 765 (Front Street) – Farmville, Richmond	Western end of US 15 Bus. / US 360 Bus. concurrency
Charlotte	Keysville	120.571	194.040	US 15 Bus. south / US 360 Bus. west (Old Kings Highway) – Clarksville, Danville	Eastern end of US 15 Bus. / US 360 Bus. concurrency
Charlotte		120.941– 121.015	194.636– 194.755	US 15 / US 360 – Richmond, Farmville, Clarksville, Danville	interchange
Lunenburg	Lunenburg	133.384	214.661	SR 49 south (Courthouse Road) – Chase City	Western end of SR 49 concurrency
Lunenburg	Victoria			SR 40 Truck east / SR 49 Truck north / SR 1024 (Tidewater Avenue)	
Lunenburg	Victoria	136.772	220.113	SR 49 north (Main Street) / SR 1002 (8th Street) – Crewe	east end of SR 49 overlap; west end of SR 49 Truck overlap
Lunenburg	Victoria			SR 40 Truck west / SR 49 Truck south / SR 661 (West 6th Street)	east end of SR 49 Truck overlap
Lunenburg				SR 635 (Oral Oaks Road)	former SR 136 south
Lunenburg	Kenbridge	143.559	231.036	SR 137 east / SR 138 south / SR 1115 (5th Avenue) – Alberta, South Hill	Western terminus of SR 137; northern terminus of SR 138
Nottoway	Blackstone	153.198	246.548	SR 46 south (Brunswick Road) – Lawrenceville	Northern terminus of SR 46
Nottoway	Blackstone	154.446	248.557	US 460 Bus. west (Church Street) – Crewe, Nottoway, Farmville	Western end of US 460 Bus. concurrency
Nottoway	Blackstone	154.968	249.397	US 460 Bus. east (North Main Street) – Petersburg	Eastern end of US 460 Bus. concurrency
Dinwiddie	McKenney	175.611	282.619	US 1 (Boydton Plank Road) – Petersburg, South Hill	
Dinwiddie		176.171– 176.314	283.520– 283.750	I-85 – Petersburg, South Hill	Exit 42 (I-85)
Sussex		193.394	311.237	SR 40 Bus. east (Lee Avenue) – Stony Creek	Western terminus of SR 40 Bus.
Sussex	Stony Creek	194.434	312.911	US 301 / SR 40 Bus. west (Blue Star Highway)	Eastern terminus of SR 40 Bus.
Sussex	Stony Creek	194.515– 194.671	313.042– 313.293	I-95 – Petersburg, Emporia	Exit 31 (I-95)
Sussex				SR 626 / SR 735 (Courthouse Road) – Sussex CH, Yale, Virginia Department of Corrections Southampton	former SR 308 south / SR 351 north
Sussex	Homeville	207.713	334.282	SR 35 (Jerusalem Plank Road) – Petersburg, Courtland	
Sussex	Waverly	215.569	346.925	US 460 (County Drive) – Petersburg, Suffolk	
Surry	Spring Grove	227.689	366.430	SR 10 (Colonial Trail West) / SR 646 (Swanns Point Road) – Claremont, Hopewell, Surry, Jamestown Ferry, Williamsburg	Eastern terminus
1.000 mi = 1.609 km; 1.000 km = 0.621 mi: Concurrency terminus

== Special routes ==
=== Victoria Truck Route ===
State Route 40 Truck
- Location: Victoria

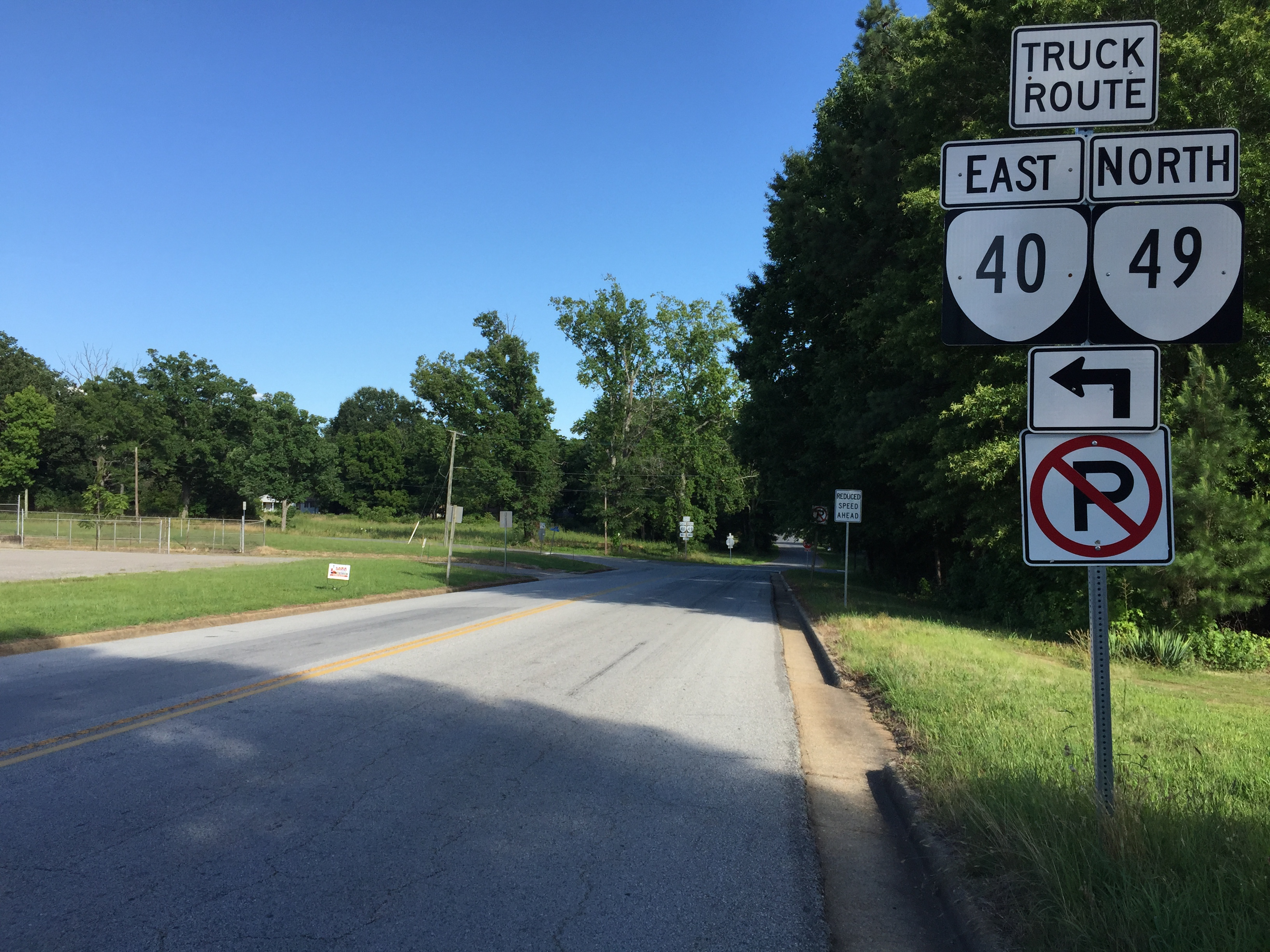
SR 40 Truck and SR 49 Truck in Victoria

Virginia State Truck Route 40 in Victoria, Virginia is Tidewater Avenue from Court Street to West 6th Street, and Railroad Avenue from Tidewater Avenue and West 6th Street to Main Street. Most of the route is concurrent with Virginia State Route 49 Truck

=== Stony Creek Business Route ===
State Route 40 Business
- Location: Stony Creek

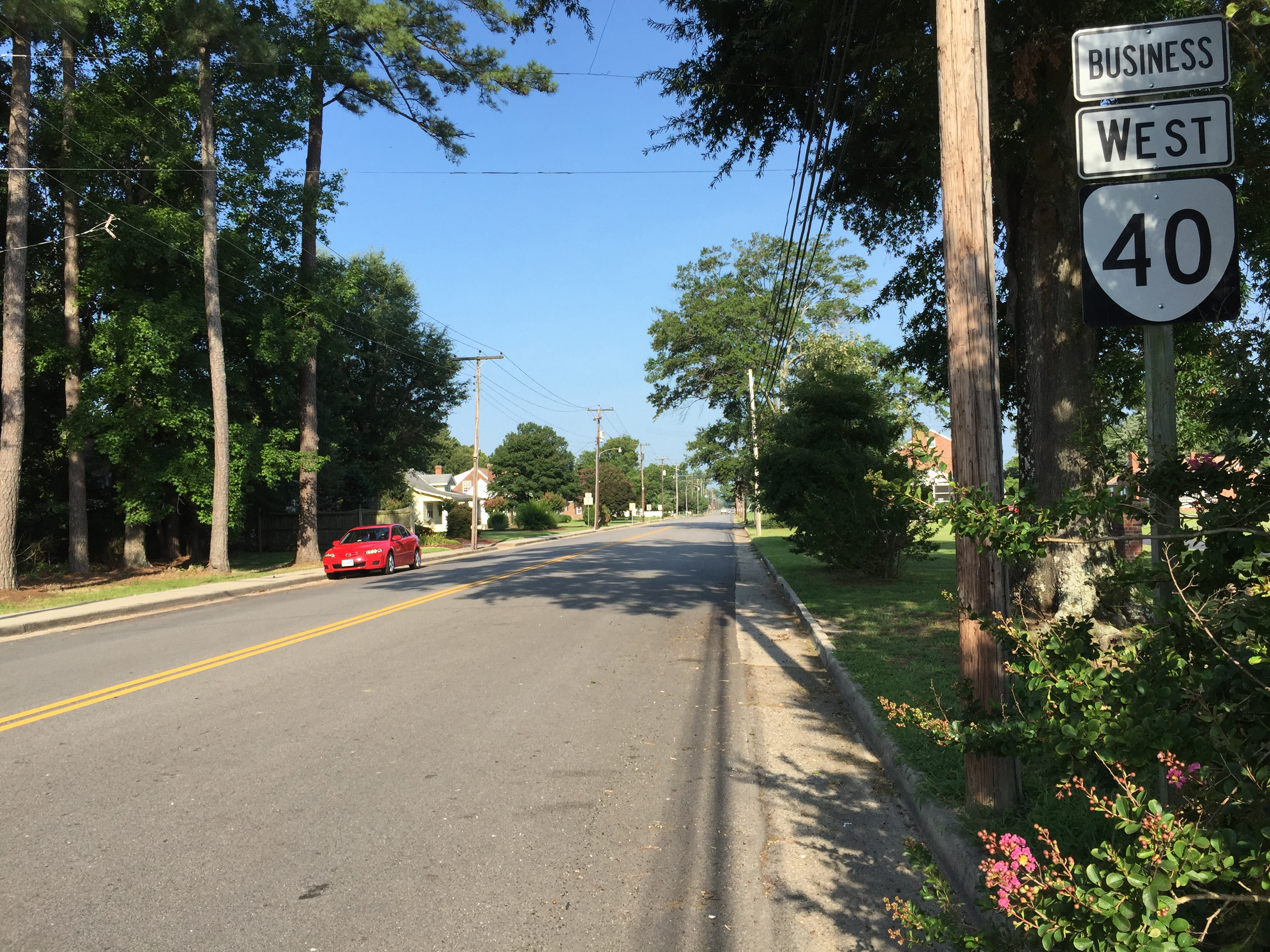
View west along SR 40 Bus. at US 301 in Stony Creek

State Route 40 Business is a former segment of SR 40 that was converted into a business route that runs through "downtown" Stony Creek. It runs along Lee Avenue from a realigned section of SR 40 west of the town, crosses the CSX North End Subdivision and then turns south in a multiplex with US 301 (Blue Star Memorial Highway), where it ends at SR 40 west of Exit 31 on Interstate 95. US 301 continues from here south towards Emporia, the Carolinas, Georgia, and northern and western Florida.

The former segment on the other side of I-95 is a .39 mile local dead end street named Redbank Road that is designated Virginia Secondary Route 317.

< SR 19	Two‑digit State Routes; 1923-1933	SR 21 >
< SR 47	Two‑digit State Routes; 1923-1933	SR 49 >
< SR 322	Spurs of SR 32; 1923–1928	SR 324 >
