= Virginia State Route 138 =

State highway in southern Virginia, US

State Route 138

Route information
- Maintained by VDOT
- Length: 16.90 mi (27.20 km)
- Existed: 1933–present

Major junctions
- South end: US 1 in South Hill
- SR 137 / SR 609 near Kenbridge
- North end: SR 40 in Kenbridge

Location
- Country: United States
- State: Virginia
- Counties: Mecklenburg, Lunenburg

Highway system
- Virginia Routes; Interstate; US; Primary; Secondary; Byways; History; HOT lanes
← SR 137	→ SR 139

State Route 138 (SR 138) is a primary state highway in the U.S. state of Virginia. The state highway runs 16.90 miles (27.20 km) from U.S. Route 1 (US 1) in South Hill north to SR 40 in Kenbridge. SR 138, which runs concurrently with SR 137 near Kenbridge, connects that town with Interstate 85 (I-85).

== Route description ==
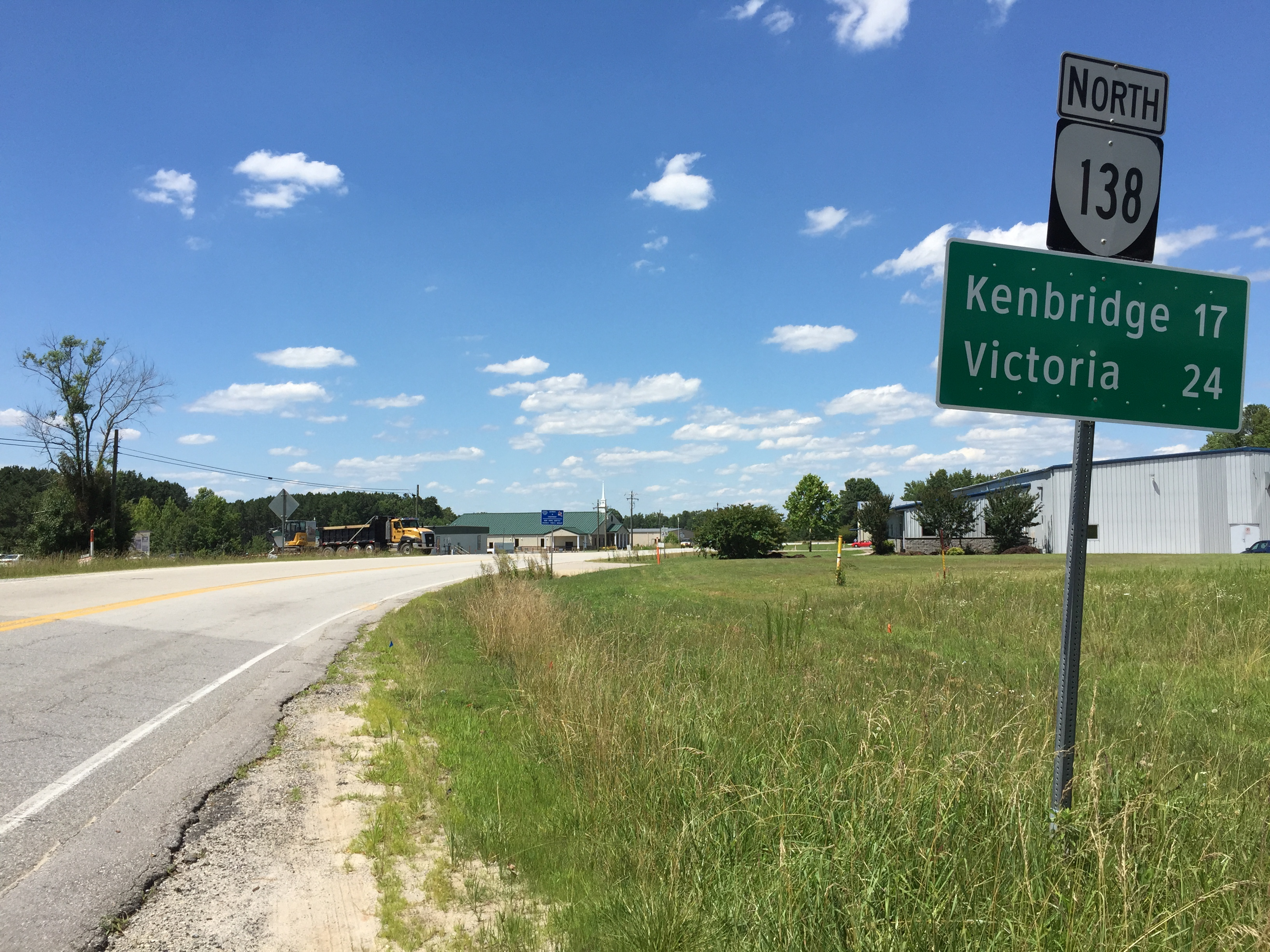
View north at the south end of SR 138 at US 1 in South Hill

SR 138 begins at an intersection with US 1 (Mecklenburg Avenue) in the eastern end of the town of South Hill. This intersection is just west of US 1's partial cloverleaf interchange with I-85. SR 138 heads north as two-lane undivided Union Mill Road, which exits the town of South Hill and leaves Mecklenburg County at its bridge over the Meherrin River. The state highway continues through Lunenburg County as South Hill Road. At Lafoons Corner, SR 138 intersects SR 137 (Dundas Road). The two state highways cross over an abandoned railroad grade and curve northwest to the town of Kenbridge, where they continue as 5th Avenue. SR 138 reaches its northern terminus and SR 137 has its western terminus at the highways' intersection with SR 40 (Broad Street) in downtown Kenbridge.

== Major intersections ==
County	Location	mi	km	Destinations	Notes
Mecklenburg	South Hill	0.00	0.00	US 1 (North Mecklenburg Avenue)	Southern terminus
Lunenburg	Bishops Corner	13.10	21.08	SR 137 east (Dundas Road) / SR 609 (Afton Grove Road) – Alberta	Southern end of SR 137 concurrency
Lunenburg	Kenbridge	16.90	27.20	SR 40 (Broad Street)	Northern terminus; northern end of SR 137 concurrency
1.000 mi = 1.609 km; 1.000 km = 0.621 mi: Concurrency terminus

< SR 432	District 4 State Routes; 1928–1933	SR 434 >
