= Southern Virginia =

Region of Virginia, United States

Southern Virginia is a region in the U.S. state of Virginia located along the border with North Carolina. The region includes the counties of Brunswick, Charlotte, Greensville, Halifax, Henry, Lunenburg, Mecklenburg, and Pittsylvania, and the independent cities of Danville, Emporia, and Martinsville.

== See also ==
- Northern Virginia
- Southside (Virginia)

== Notes ==
- Southern Virginia Tourism Region - December 17th, 2006 Virginian-Pilot Article
