= Colonial Theatre (South Hill, Virginia) =

Historic theatre in Mecklenburg County, Virginia, United States

- U.S. National Register of Historic Places
- Virginia Landmarks Register
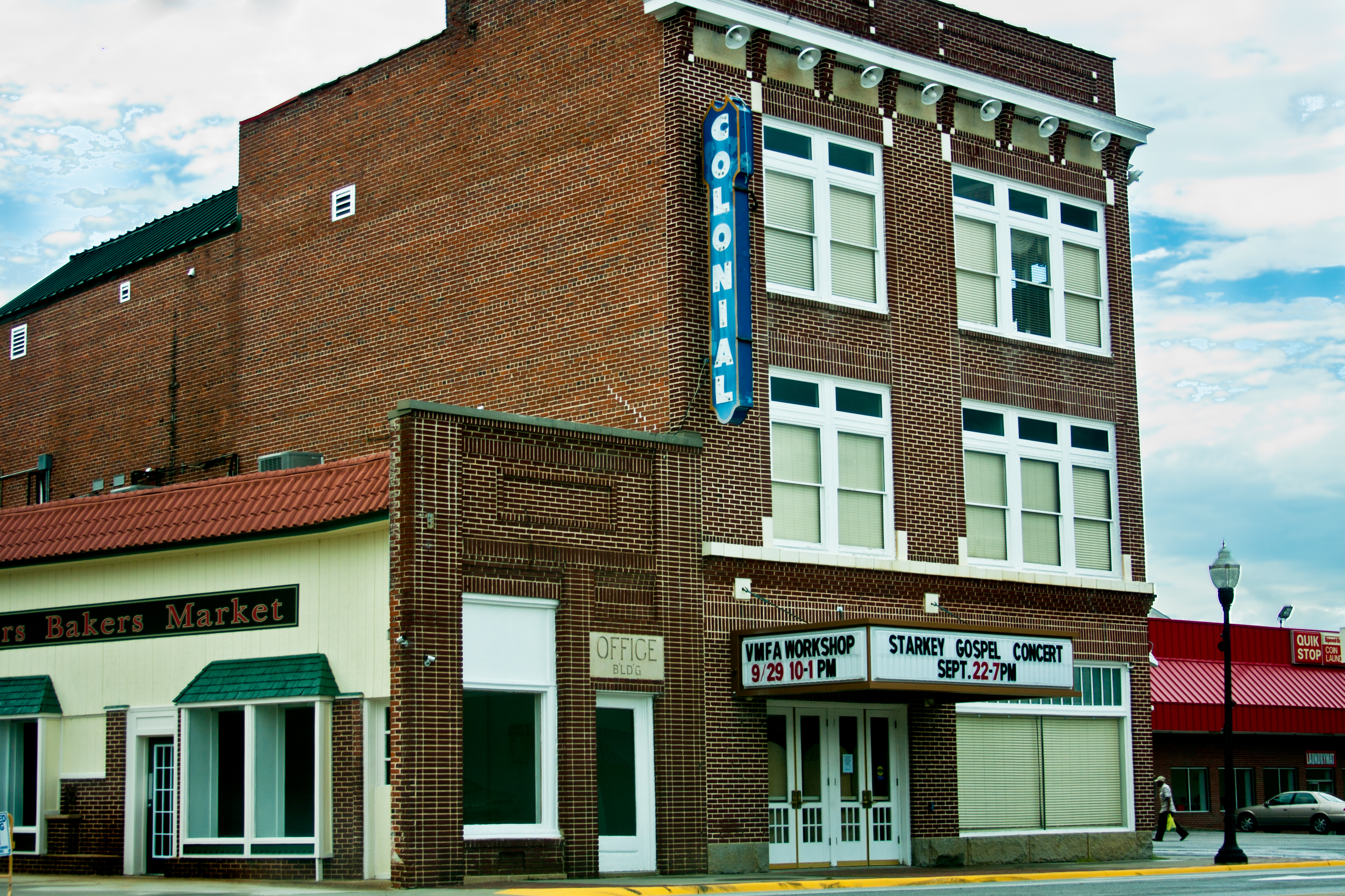
- Colonial Theater, September 2012

- Location within Virginia Location within the United States
- Location: 220 S. Mecklenburg Ave., South Hill, Virginia
- Coordinates: 36°43′29″N 78°7′51″W
- Area: less than one acre
- Built: 1925
- Architectural style: Early Commercial
- NRHP reference No.: 03000448
- VLR No.: 301-5054

Significant dates
- Added to NRHP: May 19, 2003
- Designated VLR: March 19, 2003

Colonial Theatre, now known as The Colonial Center for Performing Arts, is a historic movie theater located in South Hill, Virginia, Mecklenburg County, Virginia. It was built in 1925 by Gilbert Saunders, a local businessman who also built and owned the historic Lincoln Hotel in South Hill. It was later owned and operated for many years by Harry S. Montgomery, Jr., (Mayor of South Hill for seventeen years). He bequeathed the theatre his two sons, Harry Montgomery, III, and Arvin Montgomery, who passed it on to the town. The Lincoln Hotel is housed in a three-story brick building done in the Commercial Style. It was listed on the National Register of Historic Places in 2003, and as of 2023 is used primarily for community theater productions, musical performances, and local events.

== History ==
Built in 1925, the Colonial Theatre was the only theatre in Mecklenburg County for over two decades. The venue originally housed vaudeville shows and musical performances before undergoing conversion first into a theatre for silent movies and later for modern motion pictures. Many notable entertainers performed at the theatre during its lifespan, including Joan Crawford, Clara Bow, and Minnie Pearl.

The area's post office was housed for a time on the building's first floor, while a Masonic lodge was located on the third. The theatre closed in the 1970s and remained so until a community fundraising drive brought about a renovation effort in the early 2000s. The building reopened in 2011 as The Colonial Center for Performing Arts, featuring a 400-seat theatre, two lobbies, and a welcome center on its main floor, as well as an art gallery and offices on the second floor and a ballroom on the third. It is currently a 501(c)(3) community theatre.
