= Southside Virginia =

Region of the U.S. state of Virginia

Southside, or Southside Virginia, has traditionally referred to the portion of the state south of the James River, the geographic feature from which the term derives its name. This was the first area to be developed in the colonial period.

Southside Virginia

During the colonial era, Southside was considered the area where entrepreneurs settled, as opposed to some of the more established and wealthier families in the Tidewater counties. Many early Southside settlers were younger sons of established Tidewater families. A major portion of the territory was formed in 1703, when Prince George County was organized from Charles City County. Four other counties and three independent cities were formed from this territory, the counties in the 18th century and some of the independent cities in the 19th and 20th centuries.

In the 21st century, however, some people use a more limited definition of the region that is confined to the Piedmont area: those counties lying south of the James River, west of the Fall Line, and east of the Blue Ridge Mountains. This is the southern portion of Virginia's Piedmont region. This definition describes an area often considered to be the heart of Southside. It also accounts for social and economic changes as the eastern counties developed dense populations, and the Richmond suburbs expanded to occupy large portions of Chesterfield and Powhatan counties.

Southside Virginia is also known as Virginia's Black Belt, as it has long had a high concentration of African Americans relative to other regions of the state. Southside represents the northeastern extremity of the American Black Belt, a heavily African-American region stretching from Virginia to East Texas.

== Counties ==
Counties considered part of the region began with those divided from Prince George County: Brunswick, Dinwiddie, Nottoway, Amelia, and Prince Edward, formed from parts of Prince George County. In addition to Richmond, the independent city of Petersburg, Virginia was established in this region.

In addition, the western part of Southside has long been reputed for its isolated, rural, and culturally conservative character. Associated counties are Patrick, Henry, Bedford, Pittsylvania, Halifax, Charlotte, Mecklenburg, Campbell, Lunenburg, Appomattox, Buckingham, Cumberland, Powhatan, and Greensville counties.

The independent cities of Danville, Emporia, and Martinsville are also considered to be in the western part of the region.

The more rural, western areas of Southside are noted for sharing similarities and connections with North Carolina. For instance, residents of Danville and Martinsville frequently visit the Piedmont Triad for amenities and the Piedmont Triad International Airport. Residents of South Boston and Clarksville, Virginia travel to the Research Triangle for amenities, including use of the Raleigh–Durham International Airport.

== Climate ==
Southside Piedmont region has a climate different from the coastal areas of Virginia. Summers are typically hot, with highs generally in the upper 80s to low 90s Fahrenheit or low 30s Celsius; quite often 5 to 7 °F (2.8 to 3.9 °C) hotter than in Richmond. Winters are moderately cold, and nighttime lows often drop below freezing; frequently 5 to 7 °F (2.8 to 3.9 °C) cooler than Norfolk. Much of this has to do with the distance of the region from the temperature-moderating effect of the Atlantic Ocean.

Snow and frozen precipitation (usually less than 1 foot or 0.30 metres) usually falls every year in Southside, with the western and northern fringes of the area getting several inches more snow than the rest.

== Industries ==
Southside, along with much of Upper South, was long known for its tobacco crop. The nutrient-rich soil, along with frequent spring rains, provided ideal growing conditions for tobacco, as well as soybeans and some cold-hardy cotton plants. Tobacco exhausts the soil, however, and in the early 19th century, planters moving into the Piedmont area shifted to mixed crops.

The Fall Line was the area where the first industries were established, with mills running off the water power of rivers, in Richmond and Petersburg, Virginia, for instance. Petersburg was an industrial city with a large proportion of free blacks even before the American Civil War.

Beginning in the 1940s, various textile mills opened up in the Piedmont area of Southside, most notably the enormous Dan River Mills in Danville. Martinsville was also known for its textile mills as well. Companies like Tultex, Pannill Knitting Company, Fieldcrest, and Bassett-Walker. The city was called the "Sweatshirt Capital of the World". The textile industry, formerly located in New England and the Northeast, shifted to the South because of cheaper labor costs and less union organization. The cost of living in much of Southside is still low compared to most metropolitan areas. The Southside workforce found textile work to be much more lucrative than the low incomes associated with farming by that time. Mechanization required larger farms to be profitable.

Along with tobacco manufacturing, textile mills added to the prosperity of the Southside region to become more prosperous. Beginning in the 1970s, however, many of the textile mills closed, outsourcing work to other countries where labor costs were cheaper, such as Mexico, India and other nations in Southeast Asia, and China. The waning demand for tobacco products due to health issues affected the Southside economy.

Furniture manufacturing was another major industry, Kenlea Furniture operated for many years in Kenbridge and the Bassett Furniture company continues to operate in the town of Bassett. The Army bases Fort Gregg-Adams and Fort Barfoot employ many people. They were built up to a large extent during World War II. Some residents commute from this area to the Philip Morris factory in south Richmond.

In the 1990s new manufacturing jobs were established in the area, with manufacturing of industrial-grade metals and ceramics. Numerous prisons were established in the area, and employed local people in relatively high-paying security jobs.

== Media ==
Television stations are receivable from all parts of Southside, with the eastern parts receiving Richmond stations and the western parts receiving Roanoke/Lynchburg stations. In addition, some viewers on the northern edges of the region receive Charlottesville stations, while viewers on the southern edge receive Greensboro/Winston-Salem/High Point and Raleigh/Durham stations.

While most people receive large-market radio stations from the same places as their TV stations, Southside has a large variety of local radio. Country stations tend to dominate Southside radio, though local classic rock, adult contemporary, Top 40, and public radio formats exist.

All of Southside can receive Virginia's largest newspaper, the Richmond Times-Dispatch. Southside is also covered by Cardinal News, a nonprofit newsroom that covers Southwest and Southside Virginia. In addition, all the towns listed below (and others) have local newspapers, and they are generally weekly publications.

== Higher education ==
Colleges in the Southside region include:

- Averett University
- Central Virginia Community College
- Hampden–Sydney College
- Liberty University
- Longwood University
- Lynchburg College
- Patrick & Henry Community College
- Randolph College
- Southside Virginia Community College
- Virginia University of Lynchburg

== Cities and towns ==
- Alberta
- Altavista
- Amelia Court House
- Appomattox
- Bedford
- Blackstone
- Boydton
- Bracey
- Brookneal
- Burkeville
- Charlotte Court House
- Chase City
- Chatham
- Clarksville
- Crewe
- Danville
- Dillwyn
- Dinwiddie
- Drakes Branch
- Emporia
- Farmville
- Gretna
- Halifax
- Hurt
- Kenbridge
- Keysville
- Lawrenceville
- Lynchburg
- Martinsville
- McKenney
- Petersburg
- Powhatan
- Richmond
- Rocky Mount
- Rustburg
- South Boston
- South Hill
- Stuart
- Victoria
- Virgilina

== See also ==
- Southern Virginia
