= Sturgeonville, Virginia =

Unincorporated community in Virginia, United States

Coordinates: 36°54′03″N 77°48′37″W

Sturgeonville is an unincorporated community located in Brunswick County, in the U.S. state of Virginia.
