= Drakes Branch, Virginia =

- Town
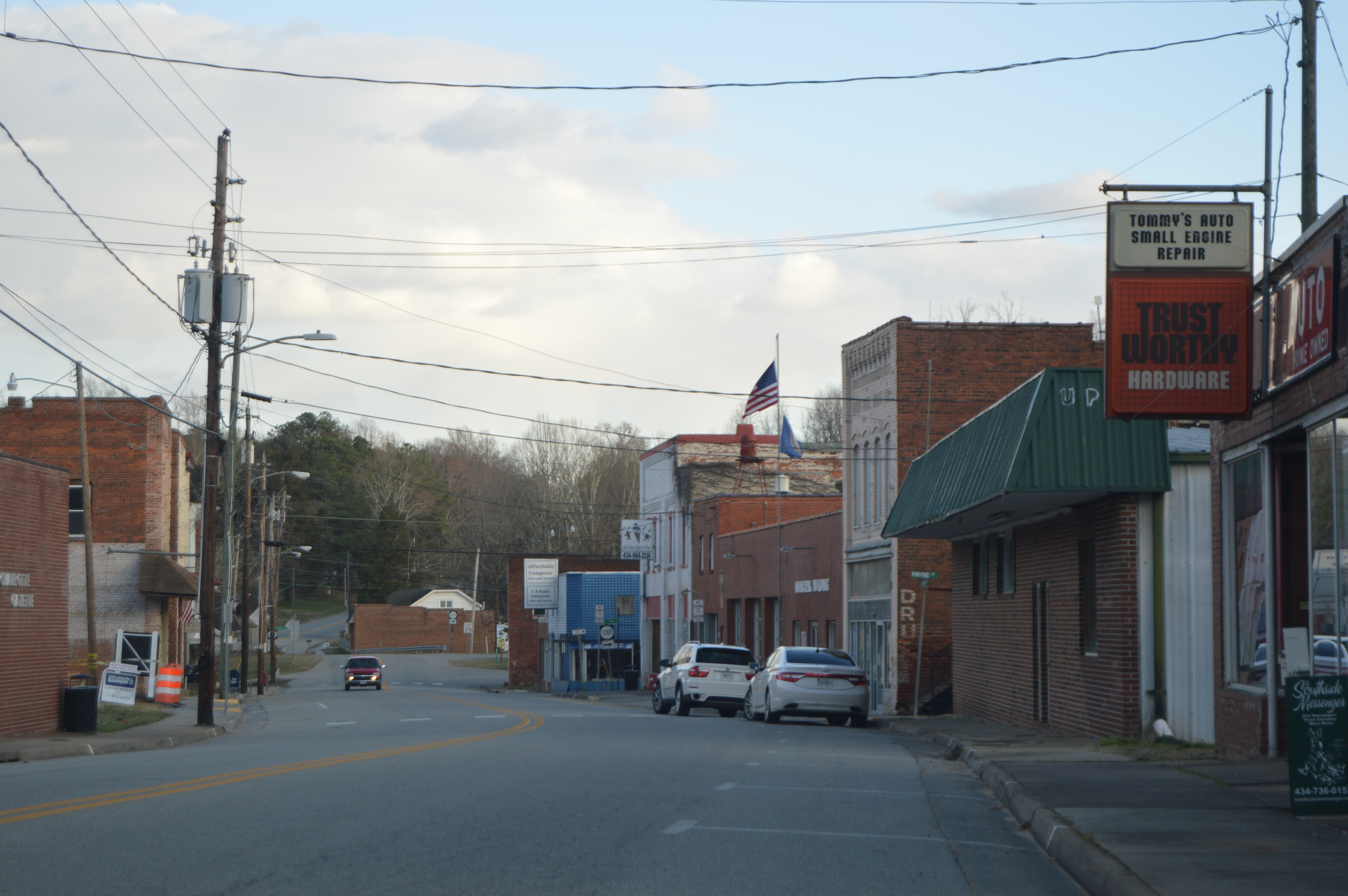
- Main Street

- Seal

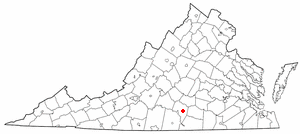
- Location of Drakes Branch, Virginia
- Coordinates: 36°59′35″N 78°36′6″W
- Country: United States
- State: Virginia
- County: Charlotte

Area
  - Total: 4.14 sq mi (10.72 km^{2})
  - Land: 4.14 sq mi (10.72 km^{2})
  - Water: 0 sq mi (0.00 km^{2})
- Elevation: 384 ft (117 m)

Population (2020)
  - Total: 533
  - Estimate (2019): 501
  - Density: 121.1/sq mi (46.75/km^{2})
- Time zone: UTC−5 (Eastern (EST))
  - Summer (DST): UTC−4 (EDT)
- ZIP code: 23937
- Area code: 434
- FIPS code: 51-23376
- GNIS feature ID: 1465943
- Website: www.towndrakesbranch.com

Drakes Branch is a town in Charlotte County, Virginia, United States. As of the 2020 census, Drakes Branch had a population of 533.

== Geography ==
Drakes Branch is located southeast of the center of Charlotte County at 36°59′35″N 78°36′6″W (36.992958, −78.601714). Virginia State Route 47 passes through the town, leading north 5 miles (8 km) to Charlotte Court House, the county seat, and southeast 7 miles (11 km) to U.S. Route 15. Virginia State Route 59 intersects Route 47 in the north part of town and leads northeast 8 miles (13 km) to Keysville.

According to the United States Census Bureau, Drakes Branch has a total area of 4.1 square miles (10.7 km^{2}), all land.

== Demographics ==
Historical population
Census	Pop.	Note	%±
1880	87		—
1910	703		—
1920	660		−6.1%
1930	583		−11.7%
1940	438		−24.9%
1950	410		−6.4%
1960	759		85.1%
1970	702		−7.5%
1980	617		−12.1%
1990	565		−8.4%
2000	504		−10.8%
2010	530		5.2%
2020	533		0.6%
U.S. Decennial Census

At the 2000 census there were 504 people, 231 households, and 134 families living in the town. The population density was 121.8 people per square mile (47.0/km^{2}). There were 262 housing units at an average density of 63.3 per square mile (24.4/km^{2}). The racial makeup of the town was 59.33% White, 40.08% African American, 0.20% from other races, and 0.40% from two or more races. Hispanic or Latino of any race were 1.98%.

Of the 231 households 21.6% had children under the age of 18 living with them, 39.0% were married couples living together, 14.3% had a female householder with no husband present, and 41.6% were non-families. 35.5% of households were one person and 14.7% were one person aged 65 or older. The average household size was 2.18 and the average family size was 2.81.

The age distribution was 20.4% under the age of 18, 6.5% from 18 to 24, 24.4% from 25 to 44, 28.4% from 45 to 64, and 20.2% 65 or older. The median age was 44 years. For every 100 females, there were 88.8 males. For every 100 females age 18 and over, there were 91.0 males.

The median income for a household in the town was $25,583, and the median family income was $35,000. Males had a median income of $25,469 versus $17,500 for females. The per capita income for the town was $15,701. About 8.2% of families and 16.8% of the population were below the poverty line, including 20.5% of those under age 18 and 14.3% of those age 65 or over.
