= Phenix, Virginia =

- Town
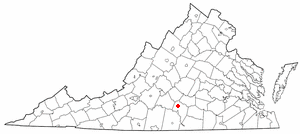
- Location of Phenix, Virginia
- Coordinates: 37°4′51″N 78°44′50″W
- Country: United States
- State: Virginia
- County: Charlotte

Area
  - Total: 1.15 sq mi (2.99 km^{2})
  - Land: 1.15 sq mi (2.99 km^{2})
  - Water: 0 sq mi (0.00 km^{2})
- Elevation: 522 ft (159 m)

Population (2020)
  - Total: 232
  - Estimate (2019): 213
  - Density: 184.7/sq mi (71.31/km^{2})
- Time zone: UTC-5 (Eastern (EST))
  - Summer (DST): UTC-4 (EDT)
- ZIP code: 23959
- Area code: 434
- FIPS code: 51-61896
- GNIS feature ID: 1472249
- Website: Official Website

Phenix is a town in Charlotte County, Virginia, United States. As of the 2020 census, Phenix had a population of 232.

== Geography ==
Phenix is located in western Charlotte County at 37°4′51″N 78°44′50″W (37.080841, -78.747183), along Virginia State Route 40, which leads east 6 miles (10 km) to Charlotte Court House, the county seat, and west 12 miles (19 km) to Brookneal.

According to the United States Census Bureau, Phenix has a total area of 1.2 square miles (3.0 km^{2}), all land.

== Demographics ==
Historical population
Census	Pop.	Note	%±
1940	340		—
1950	290		−14.7%
1960	259		−10.7%
1970	260		0.4%
1980	250		−3.8%
1990	260		4.0%
2000	200		−23.1%
2010	226		13.0%
2020	232		2.7%
U.S. Decennial Census

As of the census of 2000, there were 200 people, 78 households, and 62 families living in the town. The population density was 173.4 people per square mile (67.1/km^{2}). There were 94 housing units at an average density of 81.5 per square mile (31.6/km^{2}). The racial makeup of the town was 91.50% White, 8.00% African American, and 0.50% from two or more races.

There were 78 households, out of which 25.6% had children under the age of 18 living with them, 66.7% were married couples living together, 11.5% had a female householder with no husband present, and 20.5% were non-families. 19.2% of all households were made up of individuals, and 11.5% had someone living alone who was 65 years of age or older. The average household size was 2.56 and the average family size was 2.89.

In the town, the population was spread out, with 18.5% under the age of 18, 10.5% from 18 to 24, 22.0% from 25 to 44, 25.5% from 45 to 64, and 23.5% who were 65 years of age or older. The median age was 44 years. For every 100 females there were 90.5 males. For every 100 females aged 18 and over, there were 85.2 males.

The median income for a household in the town was $30,000, and the median income for a family was $34,583. Males had a median income of $40,938 versus $14,063 for females. The per capita income for the town was $18,572. About 9.8% of families and 7.5% of the population were below the poverty line, including none of those under the age of eighteen and 16.7% of those sixty-five or over.
