= Wylliesburg, Virginia =

Unincorporated community in Virginia, United States

- Unincorporated community
- Location within Virginia Location within the United States
- Coordinates: 36°51′20″N 78°35′25″W
- Country: United States
- State: Virginia
- County: Charlotte
- Elevation: 525 ft (160 m)
- Time zone: UTC−5 (Eastern (EST))
  - Summer (DST): UTC−4 (EDT)
- ZIP code: 23976
- Area code: 434
- GNIS feature ID: 1477737

Wylliesburg is an unincorporated community in Charlotte County, Virginia, United States. Wylliesburg is located on U.S. Route 15, 8.3 miles (13.4 km) west-northwest of Chase City and 5 miles (8.0 km) south of Red Oak. Wylliesburg has a post office with ZIP code 23976.
