= Keysville, Virginia =

- Town
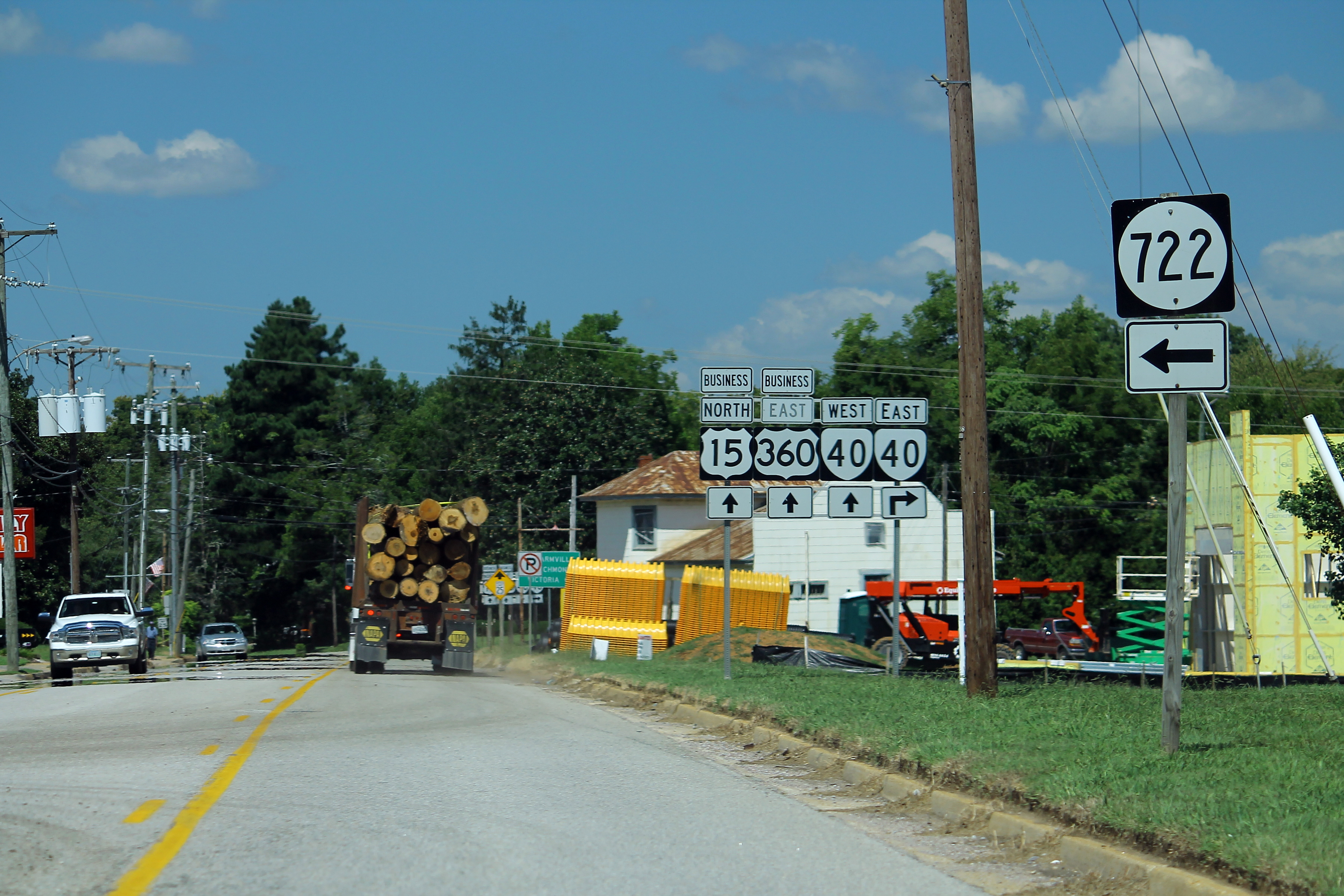
- Entering Keysville from King Street

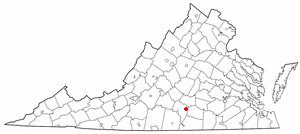
- Location of Keysville, Virginia
- Coordinates: 37°2′24″N 78°29′1″W
- Country: United States
- State: Virginia
- County: Charlotte

Area
  - Total: 1.18 sq mi (3.05 km^{2})
  - Land: 1.18 sq mi (3.05 km^{2})
  - Water: 0 sq mi (0.00 km^{2})
- Elevation: 676 ft (206 m)

Population (2020)
  - Total: 807
  - Estimate (2019): 781
  - Density: 664.0/sq mi (256.39/km^{2})
- Time zone: UTC−5 (Eastern (EST))
  - Summer (DST): UTC−4 (EDT)
- ZIP code: 23947
- Area code: 434
- FIPS code: 51-42264
- GNIS feature ID: 1468986
- Website: www.townofkeysville.com

Keysville is a town in Charlotte County, Virginia, United States. As of the 2020 census, Keysville had a population of 807. One of two branches of Southside Virginia Community College is in Keysville. The surrounding area has tobacco and mixed farming.

== Geography ==
Keysville is in eastern Charlotte County. U.S. routes 15 and 360, a four-lane highway, forms the eastern border of the town, while Virginia State Route 40 passes through the center. US 15 leads north 20 miles (32 km) to Farmville, and US 360 leads northeast 20 miles (32 km) to Burkeville. The two routes together lead southwest 15 miles (24 km) to their split at Wylliesburg. Route 40 leads east 18 miles (29 km) to Victoria and west 9 miles (14 km) to Charlotte Court House.

According to the United States Census Bureau, Keysville has a total area of 1.2 square miles (3.0 km^{2}), all land.

== Demographics ==
Historical population
Census	Pop.	Note	%±
1880	115		—
1890	126		9.6%
1900	82		−34.9%
1910	482		487.8%
1920	493		2.3%
1930	589		19.5%
1940	607		3.1%
1950	690		13.7%
1960	733		6.2%
1970	818		11.6%
1980	704		−13.9%
1990	606		−13.9%
2000	817		34.8%
2010	832		1.8%
2020	807		−3.0%
U.S. Decennial Census

As of the census of 2000, there were 817 people, 359 households, and 194 families living in the town. The population density was 694.0 people per square mile (267.3/km^{2}). There were 398 housing units at an average density of 338.1 per square mile (130.2/km^{2}). The racial makeup of the town was 64.75% White, 33.54% African American, 0.12% Asian, 1.10% from other races, and 0.49% from two or more races. Hispanic or Latino of any race were 1.10% of the population.

There were 359 households, out of which 25.3% had children under the age of 18 living with them, 34.0% were married couples living together, 16.2% had a female householder with no husband present, and 45.7% were non-families. 43.2% of all households were made up of individuals, and 20.9% had someone living alone who was 65 years of age or older. The average household size was 2.03 and the average family size was 2.79.

In the town, the population was spread out, with 20.7% under the age of 18, 5.8% from 18 to 24, 23.5% from 25 to 44, 20.0% from 45 to 64, and 30.1% who were 65 years of age or older. The median age was 45 years. For every 100 females, there were 67.8 males. For every 100 females aged 18 and over, there were 67.4 males.

The median income for a household in the town was $25,750, and the median income for a family was $34,667. Males had a median income of $27,750 versus $20,625 for females. The per capita income for the town was $16,560. About 10.9% of families and 16.9% of the population were below the poverty line, including 10.0% of those under age 18 and 21.1% of those age 65 or over.

== Revitalization efforts ==
An optical fiber link between Farmville and Keysville was the first on the agenda in efforts by Governor Mark Warner to bring broadband internet access to rural areas of Virginia, funded by the Tobacco Indemnification Fund. This was also accomplished to aid in developing the Southside Industrial Park by bringing mid-sized businesses the technological access needed in an effort to bring more industry to Charlotte County. The link is complete but has yet to be utilized.
