= Charlotte Court House, Virginia =

- Town
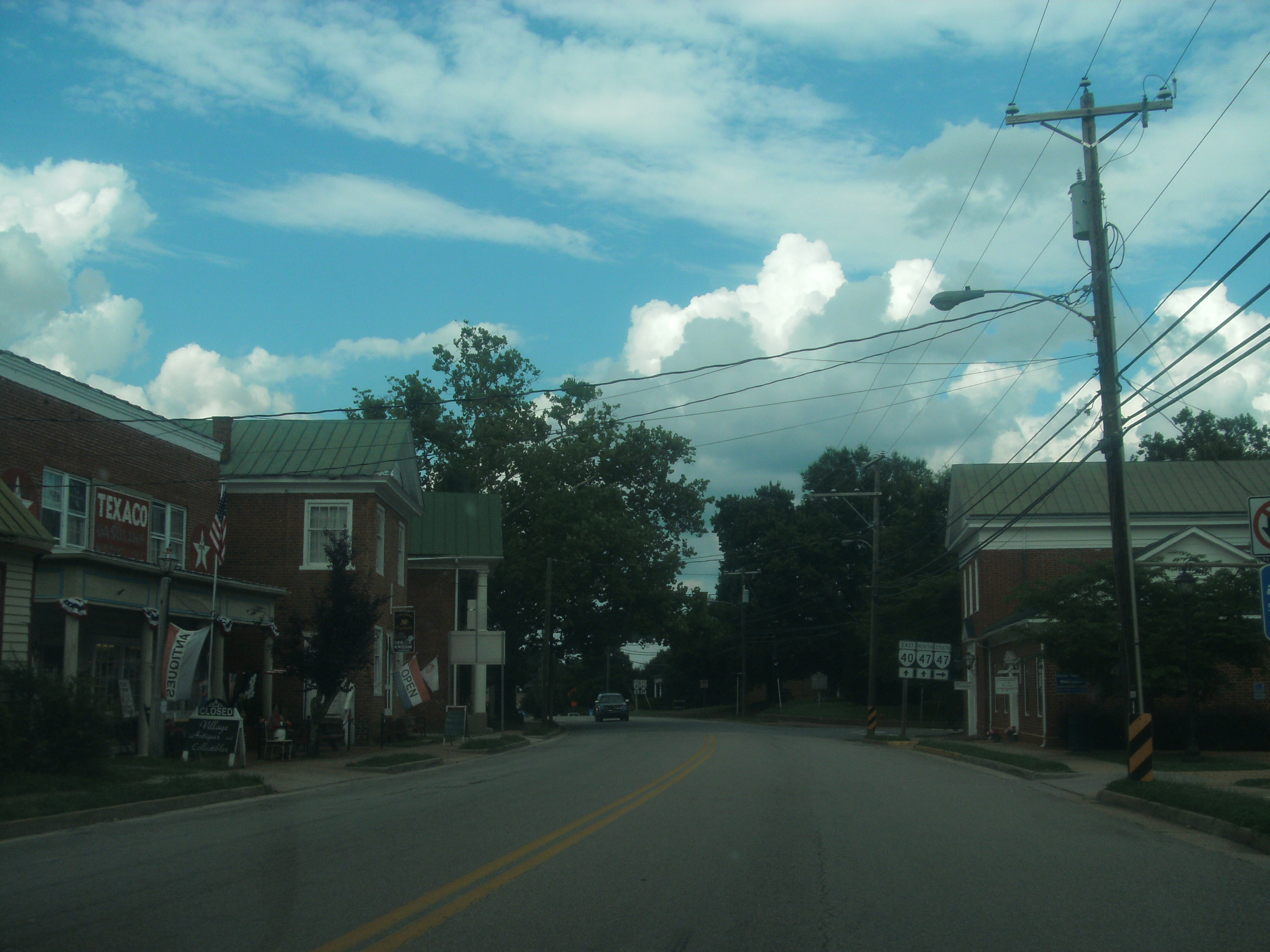
- Central Charlotte Court House

- Seal

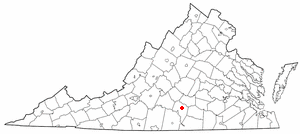
- Location of Charlotte Court House, Virginia
- Coordinates: 37°3′25″N 78°38′3″W
- Country: United States
- State: Virginia
- County: Charlotte

Government
  - Type: Mayor/Council

Area
  - Total: 3.96 sq mi (10.3 km^{2})
  - Land: 3.96 sq mi (10.3 km^{2})
  - Water: 0.00 sq mi (0 km^{2})
- Elevation: 620 ft (190 m)

Population (2020)
  - Total: 505
  - Density: 190.9/sq mi (73.7/km^{2})
- Time zone: UTC−5 (Eastern (EST))
  - Summer (DST): UTC−4 (EDT)
- ZIP code: 23923
- Area code: 434
- FIPS code: 51-14952
- GNIS feature ID: 1498462
- Website: www.towncch.com

Charlotte Court House is a town in and the county seat of Charlotte County, Virginia, United States. The population was 505 at the 2020 census.

== Geography ==
The town is located near the center of Charlotte County. Virginia State Route 40 passes through the town center, leading west 19 miles (31 km) to Brookneal and east 9 miles (14 km) to Keysville. Virginia State Route 47 crosses Route 40 in the center of town, leading north 17 miles (27 km) to Pamplin and south 13 miles (21 km) to U.S. Route 15.

According to the United States Census Bureau, Charlotte Court House has a total area of 4.0 square miles (10.3 km^{2}), all land.

=== Climate ===
Climate data for Charlotte Court House, Virginia (1991–2020)
Month	Jan	Feb	Mar	Apr	May	Jun	Jul	Aug	Sep	Oct	Nov	Dec	Year
Mean daily maximum °F (°C)	46.8 (8.2)	50.9 (10.5)	58.4 (14.7)	69.3 (20.7)	76.4 (24.7)	83.9 (28.8)	87.3 (30.7)	85.6 (29.8)	79.8 (26.6)	69.6 (20.9)	58.6 (14.8)	50.8 (10.4)	68.1 (20.1)
Daily mean °F (°C)	36.9 (2.7)	39.9 (4.4)	47.1 (8.4)	57.0 (13.9)	65.1 (18.4)	73.5 (23.1)	77.3 (25.2)	75.5 (24.2)	69.4 (20.8)	57.9 (14.4)	47.2 (8.4)	40.7 (4.8)	57.3 (14.1)
Mean daily minimum °F (°C)	26.9 (−2.8)	28.8 (−1.8)	35.7 (2.1)	44.7 (7.1)	53.9 (12.2)	63.1 (17.3)	67.4 (19.7)	65.4 (18.6)	58.9 (14.9)	46.2 (7.9)	35.9 (2.2)	30.6 (−0.8)	46.5 (8.1)
Average precipitation inches (mm)	3.79 (96)	3.00 (76)	4.01 (102)	3.76 (96)	4.68 (119)	3.95 (100)	4.82 (122)	3.91 (99)	4.47 (114)	3.58 (91)	3.21 (82)	3.43 (87)	46.61 (1,184)
Average snowfall inches (cm)	3.0 (7.6)	3.0 (7.6)	0.8 (2.0)	0.0 (0.0)	0.0 (0.0)	0.0 (0.0)	0.0 (0.0)	0.0 (0.0)	0.0 (0.0)	0.0 (0.0)	0.0 (0.0)	0.9 (2.3)	7.7 (19.5)
Source: NOAA

== History ==
Patrick Henry gave his last political speech in opposition to the Kentucky and Virginia Resolutions at Charlotte Courthouse in March 1799. The central courthouse area is a source of pride for those who work and live there. Many of the buildings represent architecture from the 1800s, including the Thomas Jefferson-designed courthouse building. The courthouse building was used in the filming of Sommersby, a movie about the post-war South, in the summer of 1992.

The Charlotte Court House Historic District, Charlotte County Courthouse, Greenfield, and Woodfork are listed on the National Register of Historic Places.

This settlement was originally incorporated as 'The Magazine' in 1756. Its name changed to 'Daltonsburgh' in 1759, to 'Marysville' in 1836, and to 'Smithville' in 1874. In 1901 the incorporation was changed to 'Charlotte Courthouse', and in 1989 it changed again, to its present name.

== Demographics ==
Historical population
Census	Pop.	Note	%±
1900	96		—
1910	329		242.7%
1920	318		−3.3%
1930	366		15.1%
1940	399		9.0%
1950	397		−0.5%
1960	555		39.8%
1970	539		−2.9%
1980	568		5.4%
1990	531		−6.5%
2000	404		−23.9%
2010	543		34.4%
2020	505		−7.0%
US Decennial Census

=== 2000 Census ===
As of the 2000 United States census there were 404 people, 148 households, and 104 families in the town. The population density was 102.0 people per square mile (39.4/km^{2}). There were 177 housing units at an average density of 44.7 per square mile (17.3/km^{2}). The racial makeup of the town was 55.20% White, 43.81% African American, 0.74% from other races, and 0.25% from two or more races. Hispanic or Latino of any race were 0.99% of the population.

There were 148 households, out of which 23.0% had children under the age of 18 living with them, 54.1% were married couples living together, 13.5% had a female householder with no husband present, and 29.1% were non-families. 26.4% of all households were made up of individuals, and 18.9% had someone living alone who was 65 years of age or older. The average household size was 2.39 and the average family size was 2.90.

The town population contained 18.1% under the age of 18, 10.4% from 18 to 24, 27.0% from 25 to 44, 24.8% from 45 to 64, and 19.8% who were 65 years of age or older. The median age was 41 years. For every 100 females, there were 108.2 males. For every 100 females age 18 and over, there were 106.9 males.

The median income for a household in the town was $33,000, and the median income for a family was $42,500. Males had a median income of $26,500 versus $20,313 for females. The per capita income for the town was $26,657. About 7.8% of families and 13.8% of the population were below the poverty line, including 29.1% of those under age 18 and 3.6% of those age 65 or over.

== Schools ==
The town contains two public schools; Randolph-Henry High School for grades 9–12, and Central Middle School for grades 6–8.
