= South Hill, Virginia =

- Town
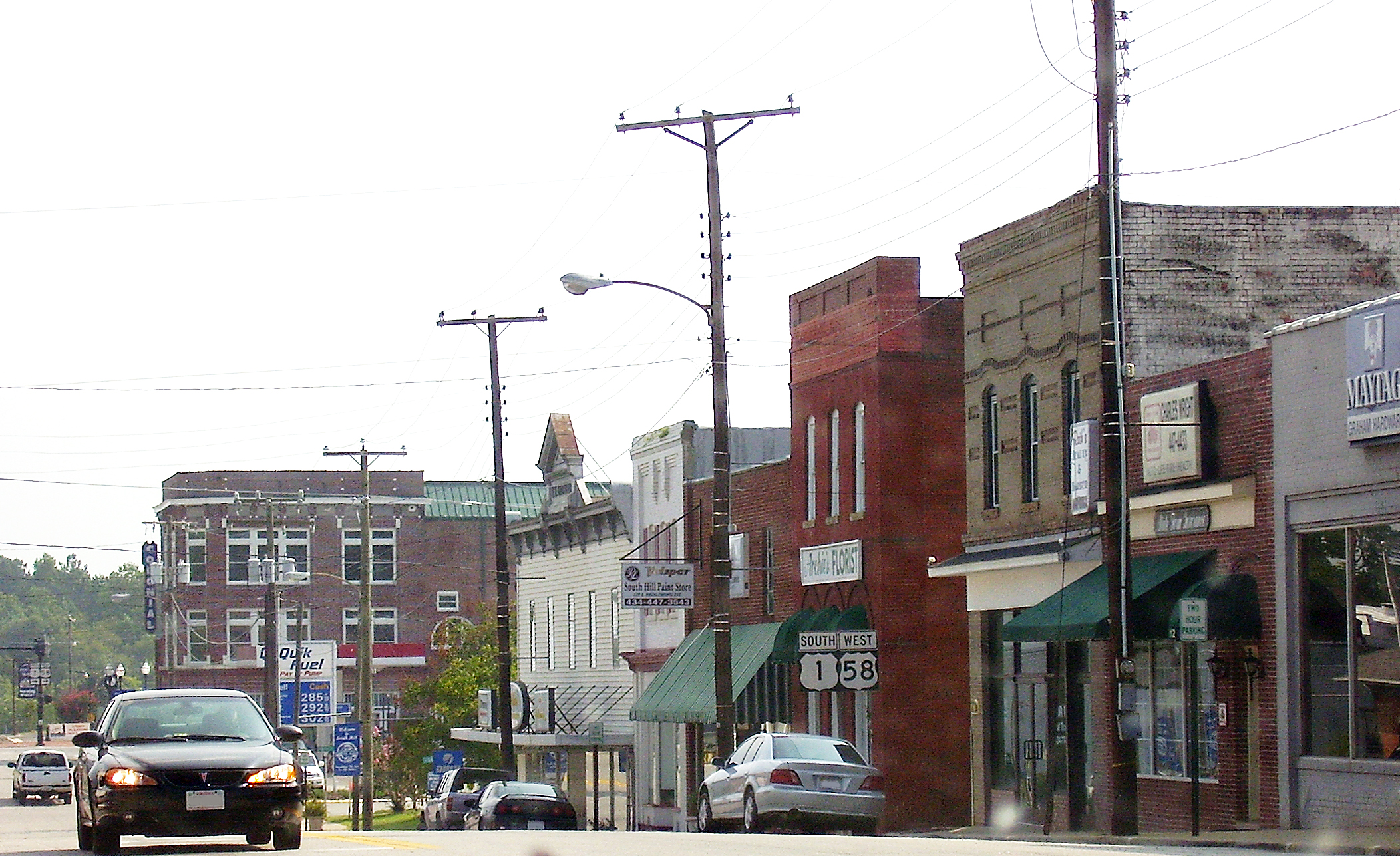
- Route 1 in downtown South Hill

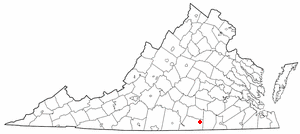
- Location of South Hill, Virginia
- Coordinates: 36°43′36″N 78°7′50″W
- Country: United States
- State: Virginia
- County: Mecklenburg
- Incorporated: 1901

Government
  - Mayor: Mike Moody

Area
  - Total: 9.85 sq mi (25.52 km^{2})
  - Land: 9.83 sq mi (25.45 km^{2})
  - Water: 0.027 sq mi (0.07 km^{2})
- Elevation: 436 ft (133 m)

Population (2020)
  - Total: 4,690
  - Estimate (2019): 4,456
  - Density: 443/sq mi (170.9/km^{2})
- Time zone: UTC−5 (Eastern (EST))
  - Summer (DST): UTC−4 (EDT)
- ZIP code: 23970
- Area code: 434
- FIPS code: 51-73904
- GNIS feature ID: 2391422
- Website: http://www.southhillva.org/

South Hill is a town in Mecklenburg County, Virginia, United States. The population was 4,709 at the 2020 census. Located on major Interstate and U.S. highways, it has a full-service hospital (serving patients from several rural counties), a tobacco market, and several hotels. South Hill has a close relationship with the neighboring town of La Crosse. Kerr Lake, a large reservoir popular with boaters and fishermen, is a short distance to the southwest.

The Colonial Theatre was listed on the National Register of Historic Places in 2003.

== Geography ==
South Hill is located at 36°43′36″N 78°7′50″W (36.726759, −78.130597).

The town has a total area of 6.31 square miles (16.4 km^{2}), of which 6.27 square miles (16.4 km^{2}) is land and 0.04 square mile (0.1 km^{2}) (0.47%) is water.

== Demographics ==
Historical population
Census	Pop.	Note	%±
1910	732		—
1920	1,074		46.7%
1930	1,405		30.8%
1940	1,739		23.8%
1950	2,153		23.8%
1960	2,569		19.3%
1970	3,858		50.2%
1980	4,347		12.7%
1990	4,217		−3.0%
2000	4,403		4.4%
2010	4,650		5.6%
2020	4,690		0.9%
U.S. Decennial Census

=== 2020 census ===
As of the 2020 census, South Hill had a population of 4,690. The median age was 42.2 years. 23.0% of residents were under the age of 18 and 22.5% of residents were 65 years of age or older. For every 100 females there were 79.1 males, and for every 100 females age 18 and over there were 71.7 males age 18 and over.

96.1% of residents lived in urban areas, while 3.9% lived in rural areas.

There were 2,063 households in South Hill, of which 29.9% had children under the age of 18 living in them. Of all households, 32.3% were married-couple households, 17.6% were households with a male householder and no spouse or partner present, and 43.8% were households with a female householder and no spouse or partner present. About 37.4% of all households were made up of individuals and 19.0% had someone living alone who was 65 years of age or older.

There were 2,278 housing units, of which 9.4% were vacant. The homeowner vacancy rate was 1.4% and the rental vacancy rate was 7.1%.

Racial composition as of the 2020 census
Race	Number	Percent
White	2,135	45.5%
Black or African American	2,167	46.2%
American Indian and Alaska Native	10	0.2%
Asian	107	2.3%
Native Hawaiian and Other Pacific Islander	0	0.0%
Some other race	65	1.4%
Two or more races	206	4.4%
Hispanic or Latino (of any race)	117	2.5%

=== 2000 census ===
As of the census of 2000, there were 4,403 people, 1,809 households, and 1,190 families living in the town. The population density was 696.2 people per square mile (269.0/km^{2}). There were 1,988 housing units at an average density of 314.4/sq mi (121.5/km^{2}). The racial makeup of the town was 58.37% White, 39.43% African American, 0.30% Native American, 1.00% Asian, 0.39% from other races, and 0.52% from two or more races. Hispanic or Latino of any race were 1.57% of the population.

There were 1,809 households, out of which 27.8% had children under the age of 18 living with them, 43.7% were married couples living together, 18.6% had a female householder with no husband present, and 34.2% were non-families. 30.0% of all households were made up of individuals, and 13.8% had someone living alone who was 65 years of age or older. The average household size was 2.33 and the average family size was 2.88.

In the town the population was spread out, with 23.2% under the age of 18, 7.6% from 18 to 24, 26.3% from 25 to 44, 23.0% from 45 to 64, and 19.9% who were 65 years of age or older. The median age was 40 years. For every 100 females, there were 77.6 males. For every 100 females aged 18 and over, there were 70.5 males.

The median income for a household in the town was $31,078, and the median income for a family was $38,156. Males had a median income of $30,128 versus $21,996 for females. The per capita income for the town was $19,319. About 14.3% of families and 18.8% of the population were below the poverty line, including 30.9% of those under age 18 and 11.2% of those age 65 or over.

== Politics ==
2008 Presidential Candidates Contributions from South Hill, VA
Candidate	Party	Total Contributions
Obama, Barack	Dem	$62,311
McCain, John	Rep	$59,990
Paul, Ron	Rep	$39,257
Clinton, Hillary	Dem	$34,777
Huckabee, Mike	Rep	$23,650
Keyes, Alan	Rep	$550

In previous years, election returns have shown that South Hill citizens favored Republican candidates (more often at 60% or above) in state and national elections since 1996, though this slipped to only 57.5% support for Republican candidate Mitt Romney in the 2012 Presidential election.

In the 2006 election cycle, while donations from residents to Democratic and Republican candidates and organizations were almost evenly divided, citizens favored Republican candidate George Allen over Democratic candidate Jim Webb. Webb eventually went on to win the election.

In 2007–2008, contributions to presidential campaigns favored Republican candidates overall, although the top single recipient as of March was Democratic Senator Barack Obama. The 283 South Hill voters who participated in the state's February 12 Democratic primary also favored Obama over Senator Hillary Clinton, 58% to 41%; the 244 Republican primary voters supported Senator John McCain (62.3%) over Governor Mike Huckabee (34.8%).

== Local government ==
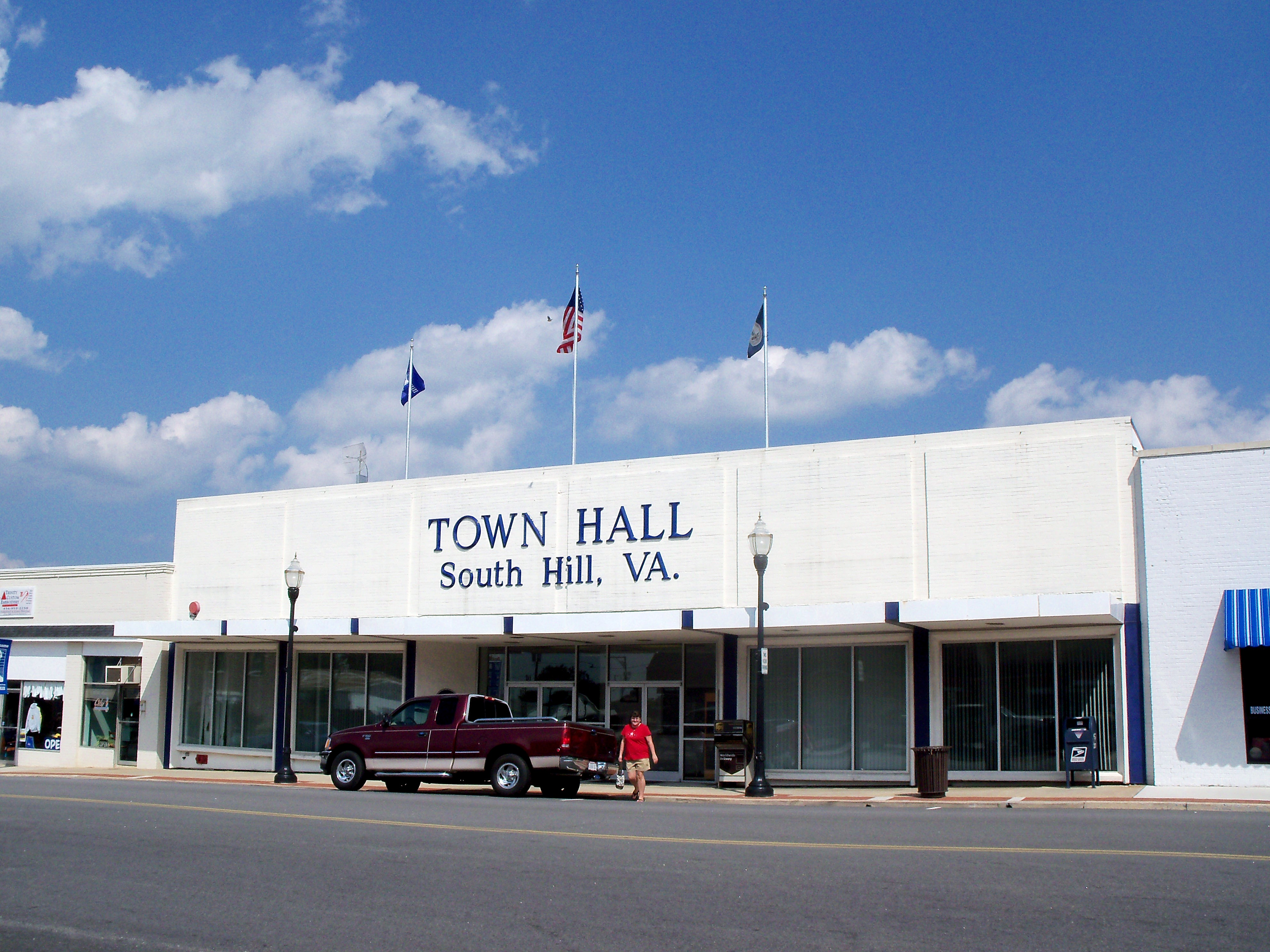
South Hill Town Hall

South Hill is governed by a council/manager form of government, with an eight-member town council and a mayor.

Members of the South Hill Town Council:
Lillie Feggins-Boone (Ward 1)
Ashley C. Hardee (Ward 2)
Gavin Honeycutt (Ward 3)
Carl Sasser (Ward 3)
Delores Luster (Ward 1)
Mike Moody (Ward 2)
Michael Smith (Ward 2)
Jenifer Freeman-Hite (Ward 3)

Mayor: Mike Moody Vice Mayor: Gavin Honeycutt

The daily operation of South Hill is overseen by a town manager, Keli Reekes.

The town council and mayor seats are non-partisan, and elections are held every four years.
