= National Register of Historic Places listings in Brunswick County, Virginia =

Location of Brunswick County in Virginia

This is a list of the National Register of Historic Places listings in Brunswick County, Virginia.

This is intended to be a complete list of the properties and districts on the National Register of Historic Places in Brunswick County, Virginia, United States. The locations of National Register properties and districts for which the latitude and longitude coordinates are included below, may be seen in an online map.

There are 12 properties and districts listed on the National Register in the county. Another property was once listed but has been removed.

This National Park Service list is complete through NPS recent listings posted March 6, 2026.

== Current listings ==
	Name on the Register	Image	Date listed	Location	City or town	Description
1	Brick House	Brick House	July 8, 1982 (#82004544)	Brodnax Rd. 36°38′58″N 77°59′14″W	White Plains	
2	Brunswick County Courthouse Square	Brunswick County Courthouse Square	December 31, 1974 (#74002110)	202, 216, 228, and 234 N. Main St. 36°45′31″N 77°50′48″W	Lawrenceville	
3	Church Home for Aged, Infirm and Disabled Colored People	Church Home for Aged, Infirm and Disabled Colored People	August 26, 2004 (#04000910)	236 Pleasant Grove Rd. 36°44′47″N 77°52′52″W	Brodnax	
4	Dromgoole House-Canaan		August 9, 2021 (#100006813)	2578 Christanna Hwy. 36°34′36″N 77°49′34″W	Valentines vicinity	
5	Fort Christanna	Fort Christanna	July 16, 1980 (#80004175)	Fort Hill Rd. southwest of Lawrenceville; 36°42′48″N 77°52′15″W	Lawrenceville	
6	Gholson Bridge	Gholson Bridge	May 5, 1978 (#78003010)	South of Lawrenceville on Iron Bridge Rd., over the Meherrin River; 36°43′01″N 77°49′52″W	Lawrenceville	
7	Hobson's Choice	Hobson's Choice	March 18, 1980 (#80004174)	East of Alberta on Old Bridge Rd. 36°52′19″N 77°48′58″W	Alberta	
8	Lawrenceville Historic District	Lawrenceville Historic District	April 13, 2000 (#00000313)	Roughly bounded by W. 6th Ave., Maria St., the Lawrenceville town line, Rose Creek, and Thomas St. 36°45′29″N 77°50′50″W	Lawrenceville	
9	Mason-Tillett House	Mason-Tillett House	January 16, 2004 (#03001443)	1050 Christanna Highway; 36°33′33″N 77°48′13″W	Valentines	
10	Rocky Run Methodist Church	Rocky Run Methodist Church	July 7, 1995 (#95000828)	Lew Jones Rd., 1.8 miles (2.9 km) east of its junction with State Route 46; 36°55′55″N 77°56′21″W	Alberta	
11	St. Paul's College	St. Paul's College	June 27, 1979 (#79003032)	St. Paul's College campus 36°45′40″N 77°50′59″W	Lawrenceville	
12	St. Paul's School	St. Paul's School	June 4, 2004 (#04000037)	Brunswick Dr. at Interstate 85; 36°49′31″N 77°57′30″W	Meredithville	

== Former listing ==
	Name on the Register	Image	Date listed	Date removed	Location	City or town	Description
1	Bentfield		January 24, 1974 (#74002109)	March 19, 2001	SW of Lawrenceville off U.S. 58 and VA 656	Lawrenceville	Destroyed by fire in 1974

== See also ==
- List of National Historic Landmarks in Virginia
- National Register of Historic Places listings in Virginia
