= Brick House =

Brick House or brickhouse may refer to:

- A brick house
- Brickhouse (surname)

== Business ==
- BrickHouse Security, an American security company
- Brickhouse Direct, an e-commerce company founded by musician Jim Brickman
- The Brick House Cooperative, a journalism cooperative.

== Music ==
- "Brick House" (song), a 1977 single by the Commodores
- Brick House (EP), a 1997 EP by Saukrates

== Properties ==
=== Australia ===
- Brickhouse Station, a pastoral lease in Western Australia

=== Nigeria ===
- Government House, Port Harcourt, Nigeria, also known as Brick House

=== United Kingdom ===
- Brick House (London), listed for the 2006 Sterling prize for architecture

=== United States ===
(by state)

- The Brick House, Louisville, Kentucky
- Brick House on the Pike, listed on the NRHP in Howard County, Maryland
- Brick House (Cazenovia, New York), listed on the National Register of Historic Places (NRHP), in Oneida County
- Old Brick House, listed on the NRHP in Pasquotank County, North Carolina
- Brick House (Shelburne, Vermont), part of Shelburne Museum
- Brick House (Clifford, Virginia), NRHP-listed
- Brick House (White Plains, Virginia), listed on the NRHP in Brunswick County, Virginia

== Other ==
- Brick House (cigar), a brand of cigars
- Brick House (sculpture), a statue in Manhattan and the University of Pennsylvania campus
- Brickhouse Brown (1960-2018), an American professional wrestler
