= Hobson House =

Hobson House may refer to:

- Riverview at Hobson Grove, also known as Hobson House, Bowling Green, Kentucky, listed on the National Register of Historic Places (NRHP)
- John Hobson House, Astoria, Oregon, listed on the NRHP in Clatsop County, Oregon
- William Hobson House, Greensburg, Kentucky, listed on the NRHP in Green County, Kentucky
- Hobson-Hill House, Richmond, Utah, listed on the NRHP in Cache County, Utah

== See also ==
- Hobson's Choice (Woodbine, Maryland), NRHP-listed
- Hobson's Choice (Alberta, Virginia), listed on the NRHP in Brunswick County, Virginia
