= Virginia State Route 46 =

State highway in southern Virginia, US

State Route 46

Route information
- Maintained by VDOT
- Length: 42.57 mi (68.51 km)
- Existed: 1940–present
- Tourist routes: Virginia Byway

Major junctions
- South end: NC 46 near Valentines
- US 58 in Lawrenceville; US 1 near Alberta; I-85 near Alberta
- North end: SR 40 in Blackstone

Location
- Country: United States
- State: Virginia
- Counties: Brunswick, Nottoway

Highway system
- Virginia Routes; Interstate; US; Primary; Secondary; Byways; History; HOT lanes
← SR 45	→ SR 47

State Route 46 (SR 46) is a primary state highway in the U.S. state of Virginia. The state highway begins at the North Carolina state line near Valentines, where the highway continues as North Carolina Highway 46 (NC 46). SR 46 runs 42.57 miles (68.51 km) north from the state line to SR 40 in Blackstone. The state highway serves as the main north–south highway of Brunswick County, where it intersects U.S. Route 58 (US 58) in Lawrenceville and both Interstate 85 (I-85) and US 1 near Alberta.

All of SR 46 in Brunswick County is a Virginia Byway.

== Route description ==
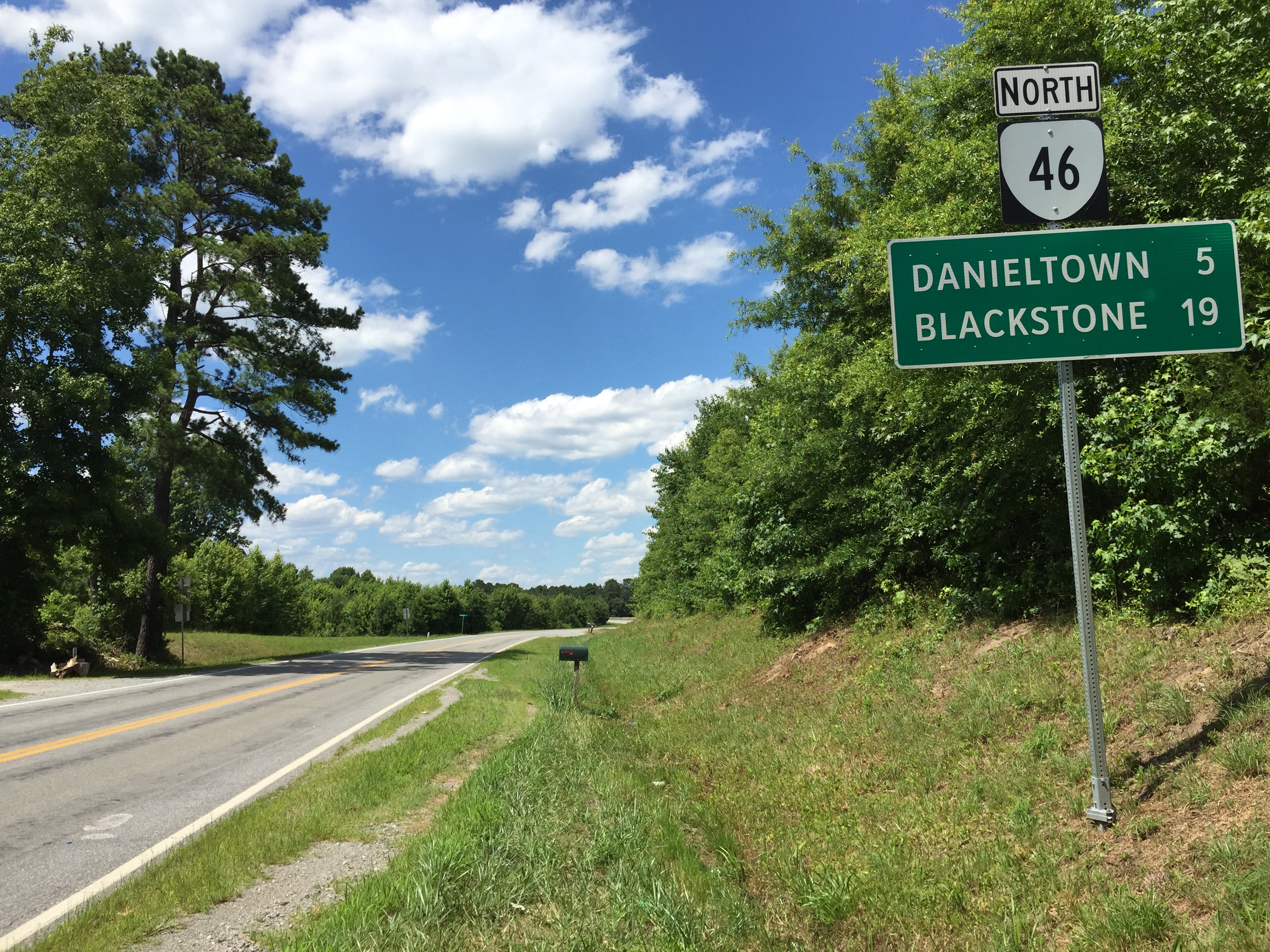
View north along SR 46 at SR 648 just west of Alberta

SR 46 begins at the North Carolina state line south of the community of Valentines. The roadway continues southeast as NC 46 toward Gaston. The Virginia state highway heads north as Christanna Highway through southern Brunswick County, where the highway passes through Valentines and Brunswick. SR 46 passes to the east of the remains of Fort Christanna before crossing the Meherrin River. The state highway meets US 58 (Governor Harrison Parkway) at a diamond interchange and begins to run concurrently with US 58 Business. The two highways enter the county seat of Lawrenceville on Hicks Street. After passing over a rail line, SR 46 and US 58 Business turn east onto Meredith Street, then north onto Main Street. The highways separate when SR 46 turns west onto Church Street. The state highway veers northwest onto Windsor Street while passing along the edge of St. Paul's College.

SR 46's name again becomes Christanna Highway as it heads northwest toward the hamlet of Cochran west of Alberta. In Cochran, the state highway intersects US 1 (Boydton Plank Road) adjacent to the Christanna campus of Southside Virginia Community College and has a partial interchange with I-85 that allows access in the direction of South Hill. Access to northbound I-85 toward Petersburg is provided via US 1. SR 46 continues northwest to the village of Danieltown, where the highway meets the eastern end of SR 137 (Danieltown Road). SR 46 enters Nottoway County when it crosses the Nottoway River on the Kennedy Bridge just east of the Nottoway Reservoir. The state highway, now known as Brunswick Road, passes through the southwestern portion of Fort Barfoot before reaching its northern terminus at SR 40 (Kenbridge Road) just south of the town of Blackstone.

== Major intersections ==
County	Location	mi	km	Destinations	Notes
Brunswick		0.00	0.00	NC 46 east – Roanoke Rapids	North Carolina state line; southern terminus
Brunswick	Lawrenceville	16.47	26.51	US 58 / SR 46 Truck north – South Hill, Emporia	Interchange; southern end of US 58 Bus. concurrency
Brunswick	Lawrenceville	17.43	28.05	US 58 Bus. east / SR 46 Truck south (Main Street) / SR 1000 (East Church Street) – truck route to US 58	Northern end of US 58 Bus. concurrency
Brunswick	Alberta	24.43	39.32	US 1 (Boydton Plank Road) to I-85 north – South Hill, Petersburg	
Brunswick		25.05	40.31	I-85 south – South Hill	Exit 27 (I-85)
Brunswick				SR 652 (Chalk Level Road) – Alberta	former SR 137 east; to SR 136
Brunswick	Danieltown			SR 137 west (Danieltown Road) – Dundas, Kenbridge	Eastern terminus of SR 137
Nottoway	Blackstone	42.57	68.51	SR 40 (Kenbridge Road)	Northern terminus
1.000 mi = 1.609 km; 1.000 km = 0.621 mi: Concurrency terminus; Incomplete access

== VA 46 Truck ==
State Route 46 Truck
- Location: Lawrenceville

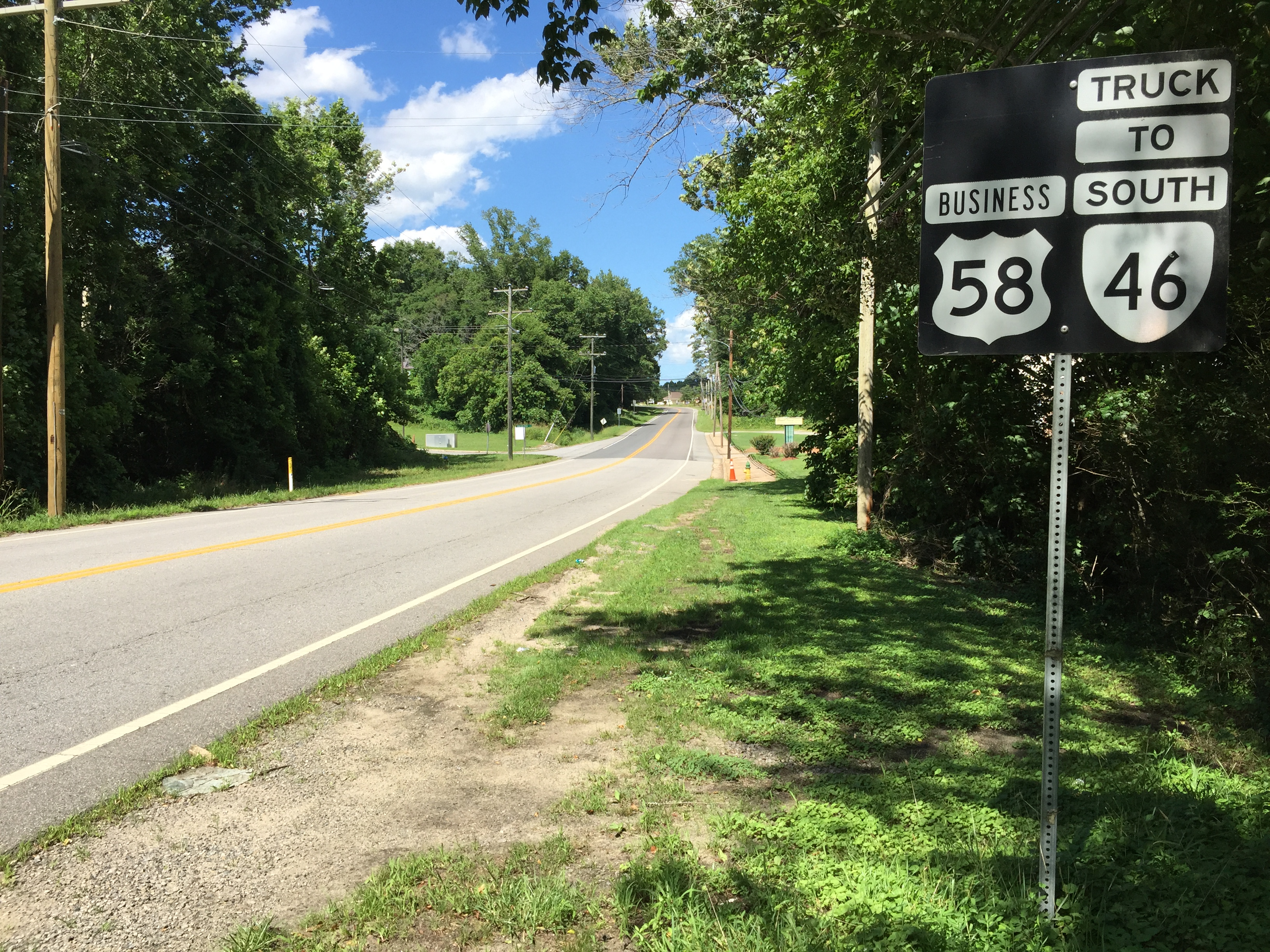
SR 46 Truck and US 58 Bus in Lawrenceville

Virginia State Truck Route 46 in Lawrenceville, Virginia is overlapped by US 58, also known as the Governor Harrison Parkway between the Hicks Street and Lawrenceville Plank Road interchanges. From there, it follows US 58 Bus into downtown to rejoin mainline SR 46.

< SR 400	District 4 State Routes; 1928–1933	SR 402 >
