= Hobson's choice (disambiguation) =

A Hobson's choice is one that must be taken or left.

Hobson's Choice may also refer to:

== Places ==
- Hobson's Choice (Woodbine, Maryland), an historic home in Howard County, Maryland, US
- Hobson's Choice (Alberta, Virginia), an historic home in Brunswick County, Virginia, US

== Arts and entertainment ==
- Hobson's Choice (play), by Harold Brighouse (1915), which has been adapted numerous times:
  - Hobson's Choice (1920 film), a silent film directed by Percy Nash
  - Hobson's Choice (1931 film), directed by Thomas Bentley
  - Hobson's Choice (1954 film), directed by David Lean
  - Hobson's Choice, a 1962 television play directed by Stuart Latham
  - Walking Happy, a 1966 Broadway musical by Jimmy Van Heusen
  - Hobson's Choice, a 1983 television-movie directed by Gilbert Cates
  - Hobson's Choice, a 1989 ballet by David Bintley

=== Literature ===
- "Hobson's Choice", a 1952 short story written by Alfred Bester
- The Terminal Experiment, a 1995 science fiction novel originally serialised under the title Hobson's Choice
