= Brickhouse (surname) =

Brickhouse is a surname. Notable people with the surname include:

- Anna Brickhouse (born 1968), American historian, author, and professor
- Jack Brickhouse (1916–1998), American sportscaster
- Richard Brickhouse (born 1939), American racing driver
- Nancy Brickhouse (born 1960), American academic
- Thomas C. Brickhouse (born 1947), American philosopher

== See also ==
- Brickhouse Brown (1960–2018), an American professional wrestler
- Brick House (disambiguation)
