= CigarsLover Magazine =

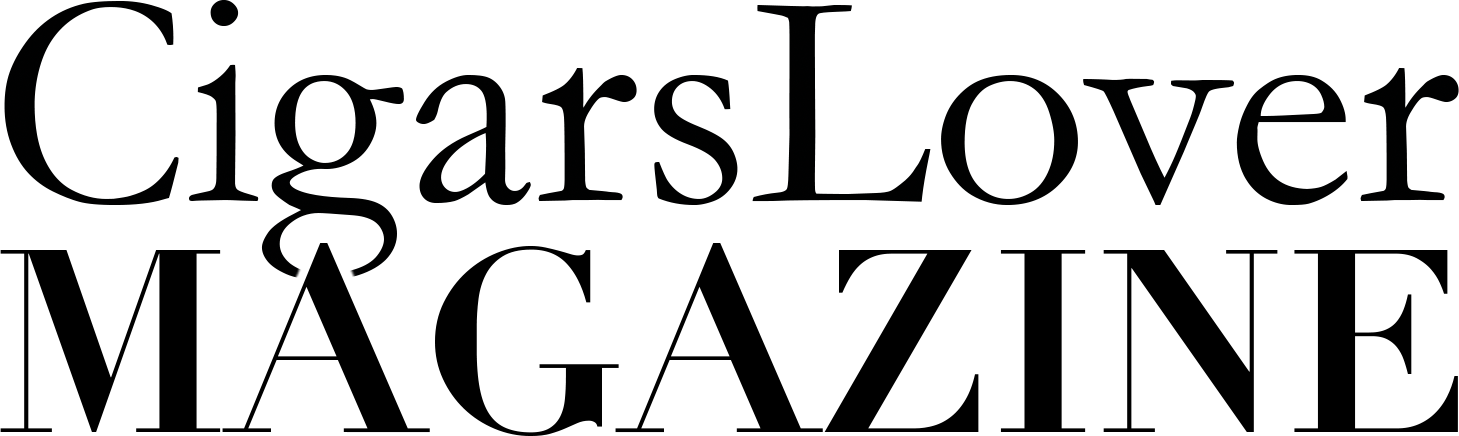

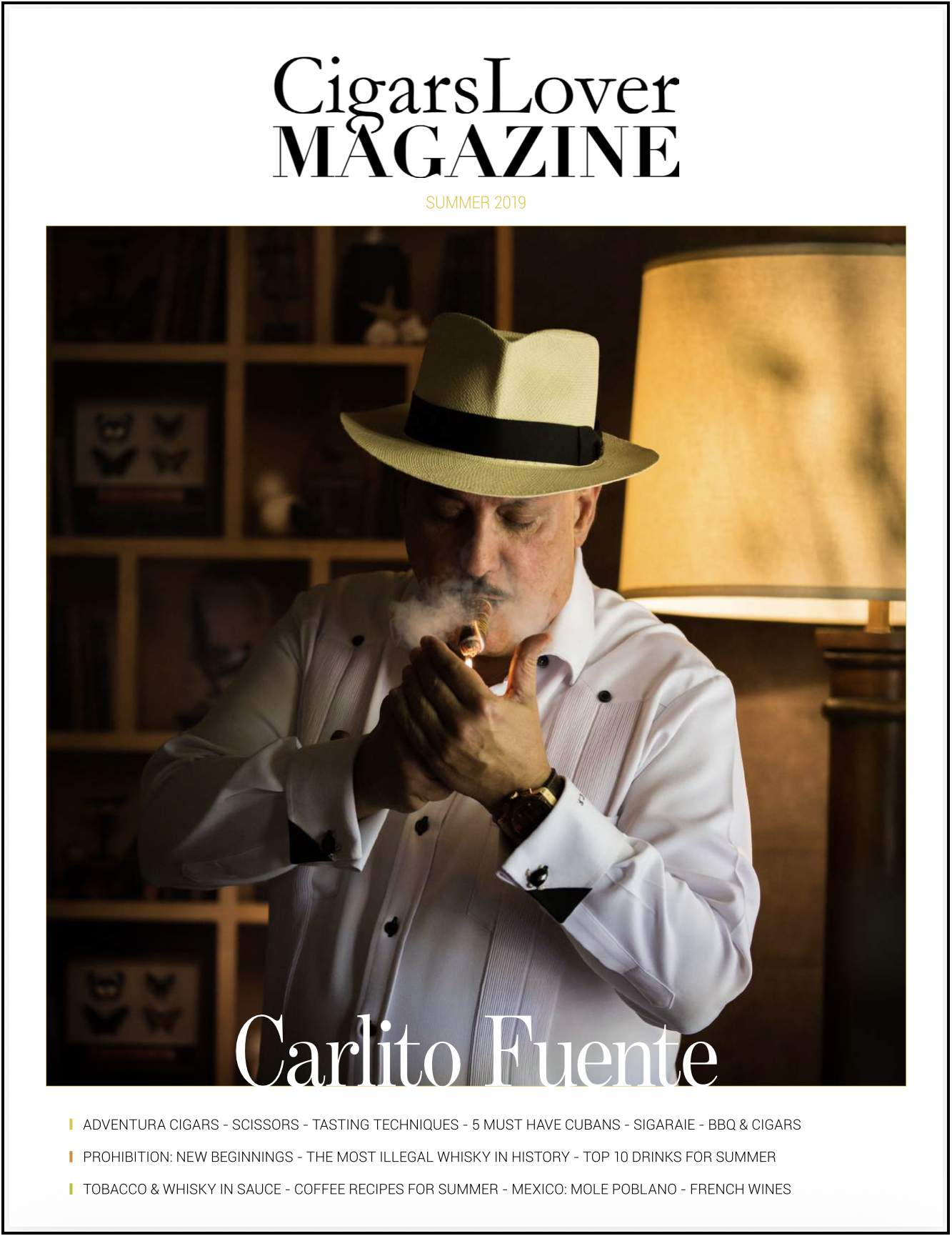
- Carlito Jr. Fuente on the cover of CigarsLover Magazine
- Editor: Editor and publisher
- Categories: Cigar culture, Whisky, Rum, Wine
- Frequency: 5 times in a year
- Format: Digital magazine
- First issue: Spring 2013
- Company: Cigarista GmbH
- Country: Switzerland
- Based in: Widnau, Sankt Gallen, Switzerland and Jackson, Missouri, United States
- Language: English, Chinese
- Website: https://www.cigarslover.com/

CigarsLover Magazine is an international publication dedicated to premium cigars and spirits. Founded in 2013, it features a Chinese edition that complements the English main release.

It belongs to Cigarista GmbH, which also publishes SpiritsLover Magazine.

The magazine features the main characters from the cigar and spirits industry, who often appear on the cover page. In the course of the year, some celebrities appeared as well in dedicated interviews, such as Luca Cordero di Montezemolo and Paul Rodriguez. Among the most notable cigar industry personalities, there were Carlos Jr. Fuente (Arturo Fuente Cigars), Nestor A. Plasencia (Plasencia Cigars), Jonathan Drew (Drew Estate) Rocky Patel (Rocky Patel Cigars), Sam Reuter (Davidoff Cigars) and Alan Rubin (Alec Bradley).

== Ratings and reviews ==
Ratings are expressed on a 100-point scale. In order to ensure a high level of objectivity and impartial assessments, the tasting panel evaluates all cigars in blind tastings, without knowledge of the products being tried.

Since 2015, each year CigarsLover magazine released the Awards, a Top 25 list of the best cigars divided by country of production (Cuba, Dominican Republic, Honduras, Nicaragua, and The Resto of the World) In 2018 the list was expanded, becoming a more comprehensive Top 50.

== Best Cigars of the Year ==
Year	Country	Cigar	Rating
2025	Cuba	Cohiba Siglo VI	95
2025	Dominican Rep.	Leaf by Oscar 10th Anniversary Criollo Toro	94
2025	Honduras	Davidoff Chefs Edition 2025	94
2025	Nicaragua	Plasencia Alma del Cielo Boreal	96
2025	Rest of the World	Partagás de Bronce	92
2024	Cuba	Partagás Línea Maestra Origen	93
2024	Dominican Rep.	Davidoff's Maduro Toro	94
2024	Honduras	Macanudo Emissary España Robusto	94
2024	Nicaragua	Sin Compromiso Selección No. 4	96
2024	Rest of the World	Great Wall Spectacular No. 3	93
2023	Cuba	Bolivar New Gold Medal	93
2023	Dominican Rep.	Caldwell Cigars’ Long Live the Queen Court	96
2023	Honduras	Gran Habano Connecticut #1	95
2023	Nicaragua	Plasencia Alma Fuerte Eduardo I	95
2023	Rest of the World	Silencio Serie M Prominentes	93
2022	Cuba	Romeo y Julieta Linea de Oro Hidalgos	93
2022	Dominican Rep.	Davidoff Limited Edition 2022 Gran Toro	94
2022	Honduras	Plasencia Cosecha 149 Azacualpa Toro	94
2022	Nicaragua	Olmec Claro Toro	96
2022	Rest of the World	Boss of the Block Cangri	92
2021	Cuba	H. Upmann Connossieur No.2	93
2021	Dominican Rep.	Perez-Carrillo La Historia Parientes	94
2021	Honduras	Alec & Bradley Kintsugi Corona Gorda	94
2021	Nicaragua	Aroma de Cuba Pasión Robusto	95
2021	Rest of the World	Cohiba Serie M	94
2020	Cuba	Punch Doube Coronas	93
2020	Dominican Rep.	Adventura Royal Return King's Gold Robusto	95
2020	Honduras	Rocky Patel Number 6 Corona	94
2020	Nicaragua	Joya de Nicaragua Número 1 Le Premier	94
2020	Rest of the World	Casdagli Daughters of the Wind Cremello	93
2019	Cuba	Romeo y Julieta Añejados Churchills	93
2019	Dominican Rep.	La Aurora 115th Anniversary Limited Edition Belicoso	93
2019	Honduras	Illusione Épernay 10th Anniversary D'Aosta	95
2019	Nicaragua	The Liga Privada 10 Aniversario	94
2019	Rest of the World	Tatuaje Escasos H	93
2018	Cuba	Vegas Robaina Don Alejandro	94
2018	Dominican Rep.	AVO LE05 30 Years	93
2018	Honduras	Cavalier Genéve White Series Lancero	94
2018	Nicaragua	Don Pepin Garcia 15th Anniversary Robusto	94
2018	Rest of the World	Hedon Rêveur	92
2017	Cuba	Cohiba Talisman Limited Edition 2017	94
2017	Dominican Rep.	Davidoff Royal Robusto	95
2017	Honduras	Alec Bradley Black Market Illicit Toro	93
2017	Nicaragua	El Gueguense Maduro Corona Gorda	95
2017	Rest of the World	Hernandez & Ruiz Toro	92
2016	Cuba	Cuaba Distinguidos	94
2016	Dominican Rep.	Quesada Reserva Privada Oscuro Double Corona	94
2016	Honduras	Eiroa Robusto	93
2016	Nicaragua	Padrón Serie 1926 90th Aniversario Natural	96
2016	Rest of the World	Casa Turrent Gran Robusto Maduro	93
2015	Cuba	Trinidad Fundadores	94
2015	Dominican Rep.	Davidoff Winston Churchill The Commander	93
2015	Honduras	Flor de Selva Lancero 20th Anniversario	93
2015	Nicaragua	Padron 1964 Diplomatico Natural	94
2015	Rest of the World	La Palina Goldie Laguito Especial	92

== Magazine format and distribution ==
CigarsLover Magazine is a digital magazine. The issues are published online and made available to readers worldwide. In its early years, the magazine followed a quarterly release schedule aligned with seasons (e.g., Spring, Summer, Autumn, Winter issues). In 2020, the magazine started publishing five issues per year, numbered I through V.
