= Virginia State Route 136 =

State highway in Brunswick County, Virginia, US

State Route 136

Route information
- Maintained by VDOT
- Length: 1.17 mi (1.88 km)
- Existed: 1950s–present

Major junctions
- West end: SR 652 in Alberta
- East end: US 1 in Alberta

Location
- Country: United States
- State: Virginia
- Counties: Brunswick

Highway system
- Virginia Routes; Interstate; US; Primary; Secondary; Byways; History; HOT lanes
← SR 135	→ SR 137

State Route 136 (SR 136) is a primary state highway in the U.S. state of Virginia. The state highway runs 1.17 miles (1.88 km) from SR 652 east to U.S. Route 1 (US 1) within Alberta in northern Brunswick County.

== Route description ==
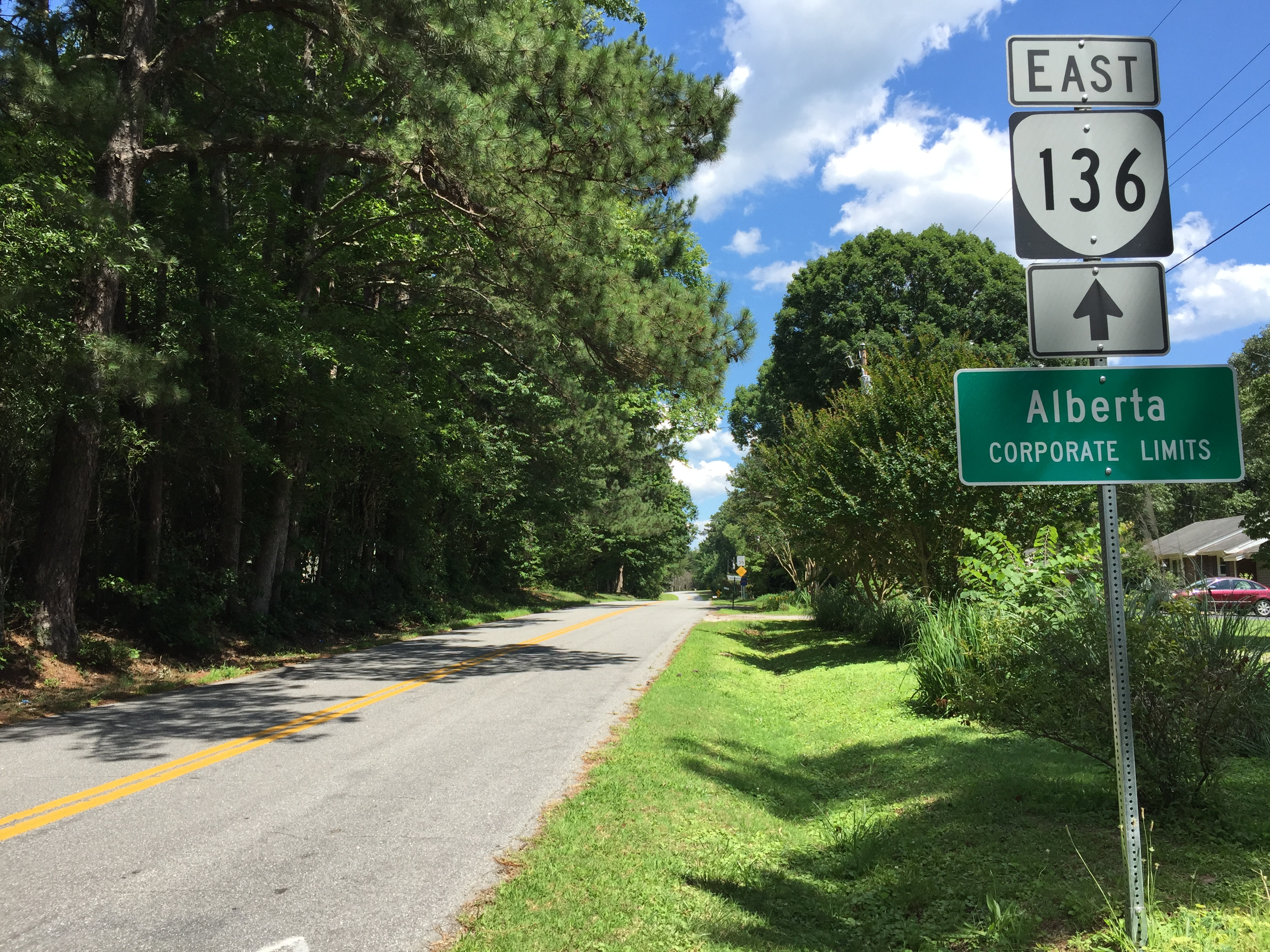
View east along SR 136 in Alberta

SR 136 begins at the western town limit of Alberta. The road continues west as SR 652 (Chalk Level Road), which connects the town to SR 46. The state highway starts as School Street, then passes through a sharp S-curve and continues as 2nd Avenue to the center of town. In the eastern part of the town, SR 136 turns south onto Church Street to reach its eastern terminus at US 1 (Boydton Plank Road).

== Major intersections ==
The entire route is in Alberta, Brunswick County.

mi	km	Destinations	Notes
0.00	0.00	SR 652 (Chalk Level Road) – Kenbridge	Alberta town limit; western terminus; former SR 137 west
1.17	1.88	US 1 (Boydton Plank Road)	Eastern terminus
1.000 mi = 1.609 km; 1.000 km = 0.621 mi

< SR 436	District 4 State Routes; 1928–1933	SR 438 >
