= Diamond Crown Maximus =

Cigar Brand in the Dominican Republic

Diamond Crown Maximus (or Maximus by Diamond Crown) is a super premium cigar brand handmade by Tabacalera A. Fuente in the Dominican Republic for the J.C. Newman Cigar Company.

Introduced in 2003, Diamond Crown Maximus is a full-bodied cigar with a dark, rich Ecuadorian-grown wrapper. It has a much stronger blend, but is just as complex as its smooth, medium-bodied cousin, Diamond Crown cigar.

The wrapper leaves are from Oliva Tobacco's El Bajo farm, and are selected from the upper corona portion of the plant, which adds to the strength of its taste.

== Ratings ==
Cigar Aficionado Magazine has awarded Diamond Crown Maximus cigars with ratings of 90.

Top25Cigars.com lists Diamond Crown Maximus cigars, as two of the top twenty-five cigars in the world.

== Size Chart ==
Name	Length (inches)	Ring Gauge
Maximus #1 Double Corona	8	50
Maximus #2 Churchill	7	50
Maximus #3 Pyramid	6.625	50
Maximus #4 Toro	6	50
Maximus #5 Robusto	5	50

Source: Cigar Cyclopedia

== Tobacco ==
- Wrapper: El Bajo Ecudarian Ligero Oscuro Sun Grown
- Binder: Dominican
- Filler: Dominican

Source: Cigar Cyclopedia
