= Bill Connelly (baseball) =

American baseball player (1925–1980)

- Pitcher
- Born: June 29, 1925; Alberta, Virginia, U.S.
- Died: November 27, 1980 (aged 55); Richmond, Virginia, U.S.
- Batted: Left Threw: Right

MLB debut
- August 22, 1945, for the Philadelphia Athletics

Last MLB appearance
- June 16, 1953, for the New York Giants

MLB statistics
- Win–loss record: 6–2
- Earned run average: 6.92
- Strikeouts: 34
- Stats at Baseball Reference

Teams
- Philadelphia Athletics (1945); Chicago White Sox (1950); Detroit Tigers (1950); New York Giants (1952–1953)

William Wirt Connelly (June 29, 1925 – November 27, 1980) was an American professional baseball player. A right-handed pitcher, his pro career extended from 1945 to 1957, with appearances in Major League Baseball in 1945, 1950, and 1952–53. He batted left-handed, stood 6 feet (1.8 m) tall and weighed 175 pounds (79 kg). The native of Alberta, Virginia, attended Hampden–Sydney College.

Connelly had a 6–2 record with a 6.92 earned-run average in the Majors with four different teams: the Philadelphia Athletics, Chicago White Sox, Detroit Tigers and New York Giants. Purchased by the Giants from the Triple-A American Association in August 1952, he won all five of his decisions during the last six weeks of the season, helping New York finish second in the National League. In 25 career games (including seven starting assignments) and 661/3 innings pitched, he allowed 71 hits and 53 bases on balls, striking out 34. He had no complete games, shutouts or saves.
