= Virginia State Route 137 =

State highway in southern Virginia, US

State Route 137

Route information
- Maintained by VDOT
- Length: 12.03 mi (19.36 km)
- Existed: 1933–present

Major junctions
- West end: SR 40 in Kenbridge
- SR 138 / SR 609 near Kenbridge
- East end: SR 46 at Danieltown

Location
- Country: United States
- State: Virginia
- Counties: Lunenburg, Brunswick

Highway system
- Virginia Routes; Interstate; US; Primary; Secondary; Byways; History; HOT lanes
← SR 136	→ SR 138

State Route 137 (SR 137) is a primary state highway in the U.S. state of Virginia. The state highway runs 12.03 miles (19.36 km) from SR 40 in Kenbridge east to SR 46 at Danieltown. SR 137 runs concurrently with SR 138 in eastern Lunenburg County and connects Kenbridge with SR 46, the main north–south highway of Brunswick County.

== Route description ==
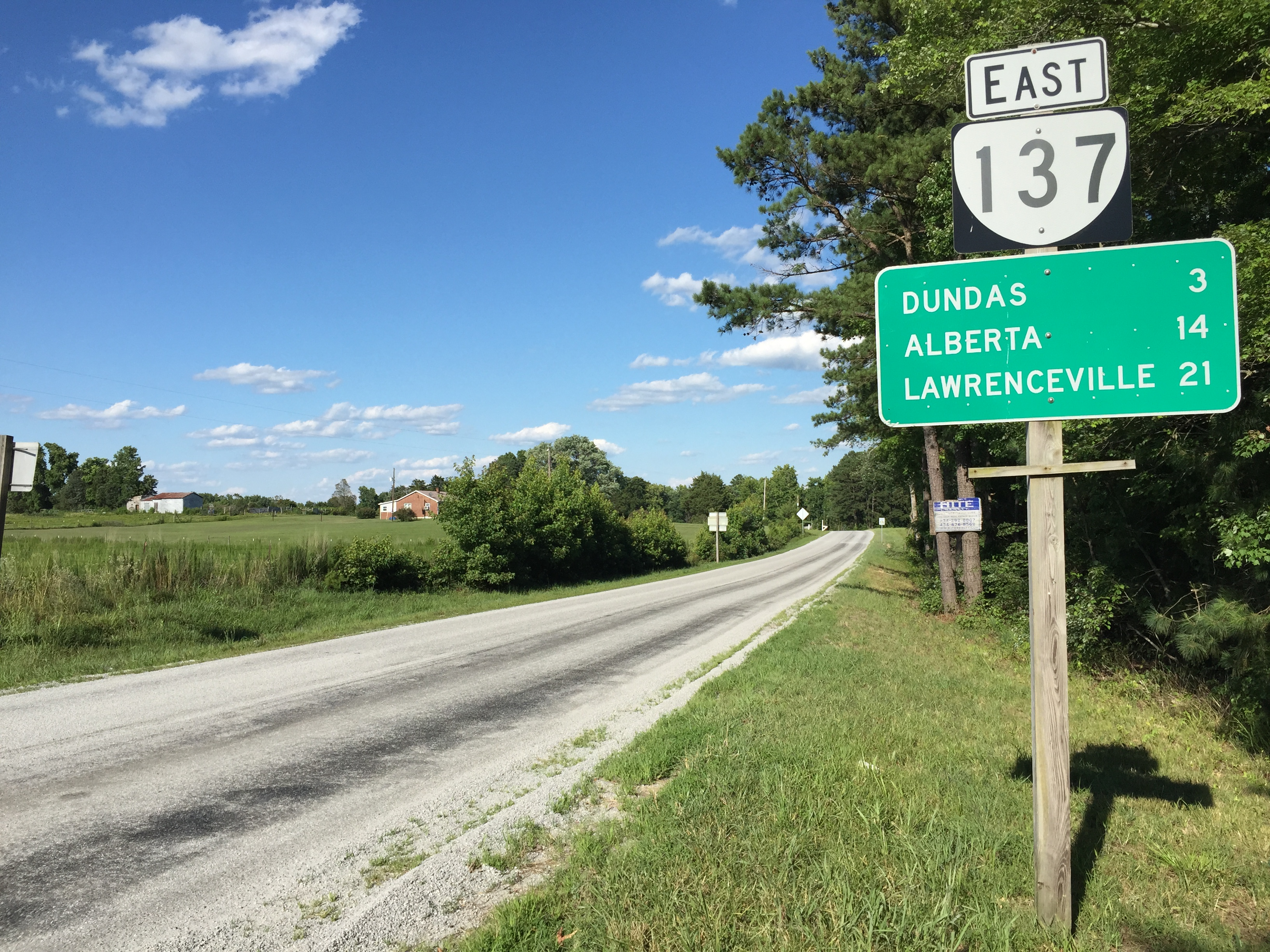
View east along SR 137 at SR 138 near Kenbridge

SR 137 begins at an intersection with SR 40 (Broad Street) in the town of Kenbridge. This intersection is also the northern terminus of SR 138, which runs concurrently with SR 137 southeast along 5th Avenue. The two highways exit the town as Dundas Road, which curves to the south and crosses over an abandoned railroad grade. At Lafoons Corner, SR 138 continues south as South Hill Road toward South Hill while SR 137 turns east to remain on Dundas Road. The state highway crosses over the former rail line again, then turns right at SR 645 (Jonesboro Road) to remain on Dundas Road, which parallels the abandoned rail line to the hamlet of Dundas. SR 137 turns south at the northern segment of SR 603 (Potts Spring Road), intersects the former rail line, and turns east again at the southern segment of SR 603 (Mill Pond Road). East of Dundas, the state highway crosses the Lunenburg–Brunswick county line. SR 137 continues on Danieltown Road to its eastern terminus at SR 46 (Christanna Highway) at the hamlet of Danieltown.

== Major intersections ==
County	Location	mi	km	Destinations	Notes
Lunenburg	Kenbridge	0.00	0.00	SR 40 (Broad Street)	Western terminus; western end of SR 138 concurrency
Lunenburg	Bishops Corner	3.80	6.12	SR 138 south (South Hill Road) / SR 609 (Afton Grove Road) – South Hill	Eastern end of SR 138 concurrency
Brunswick	Danieltown	12.03	19.36	SR 46 (Christanna Highway) – Blackstone, Fort Barfoot, Lawrenceville	Eastern terminus
1.000 mi = 1.609 km; 1.000 km = 0.621 mi: Concurrency terminus
