= Dundas, Virginia =

Unincorporated community in Virginia, United States

- Unincorporated community
- Location within Virginia Location within the United States
- Coordinates: 36°54′54″N 78°01′18″W
- Country: United States
- State: Virginia
- County: Lunenburg
- Elevation: 456 ft (139 m)
- Time zone: UTC-5 (Eastern (EST))
  - Summer (DST): UTC-4 (EDT)
- ZIP code: 23938
- Area code: 434
- GNIS feature ID: 1477284

Dundas is an unincorporated community in Lunenburg County, Virginia, United States. Dundas is located on Virginia State Route 137 in eastern Lunenburg County, 6.6 miles (10.6 km) east-southeast of Kenbridge. Dundas has a post office with ZIP code 23938, which opened on February 20, 1908. The Dundas Ruritan Club claims to make the best sheep stew in the world, cooking it twice a year in large batches to raise money for Ruritan community-service projects.
