= J. C. Newman Cigar Company =

Cigar maker

J.C. Newman Cigar Company
- Type: Private
- Industry: Cigar
- Founded: 1895
- Headquarters: Tampa, Florida
- Key people: Eric Newman President, Robert Newman Executive Vice President)
- Products: Premium, handmade cigars, humidors and cigar accessories

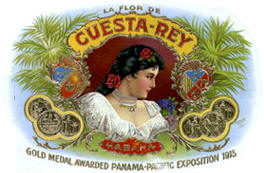
logo of the Cuesta-Rey cigar

J.C. Newman Cigar Company was established in 1895 and is the oldest family-owned premium cigar maker in the United States. It was founded in Cleveland, Ohio by Julius Caeser Newman, a Hungarian immigrant. The business relocated to a historic 1910 cigar factory (Regensburg cigar factory) in the Cigar City of Ybor City, Florida in 1954. The family business is now in its fourth generation of Newman ownership.

== Company overview ==
J.C. Newman Cigar Company manufactures and distributes premium cigars. As a Hungarian immigrant, J.C. Newman rolled his first cigars in the family barn in Cleveland in 1895. In 1954, the company moved to Tampa's Ybor City cigar district to be closer to Cuba. J.C. Newman is also the worldwide distributor for Arturo Fuente cigars, except for Western Europe. Today, J.C. Newman's cigars are sold in 81 countries around the world.

== Cigar brands ==
=== Dominican Republic cigars ===
- Cuesta-Rey
- Diamond Crown
- Diamond Crown Black Diamond
- Diamond Crown Maximus
- Diamond Crown Julius Caeser
- La Unica

=== Nicaraguan cigars ===
- Alcazar
- El Baton
- Brick House
- Don Jose
- Don Seville
- HavanaQ
- Quorum
- Perla Del Mar
- Yagua

=== United States cigars ===
- Decision
- Factory Firsts
- Factory Throwouts
- Rigoletto
- Tampa Trolleys
- The American
- Trader Jacks

== Humidors and cigar accessories ==
- Diamond Crown, made by Reed & Barton
- Craftsman's Bench

== Historic facts ==
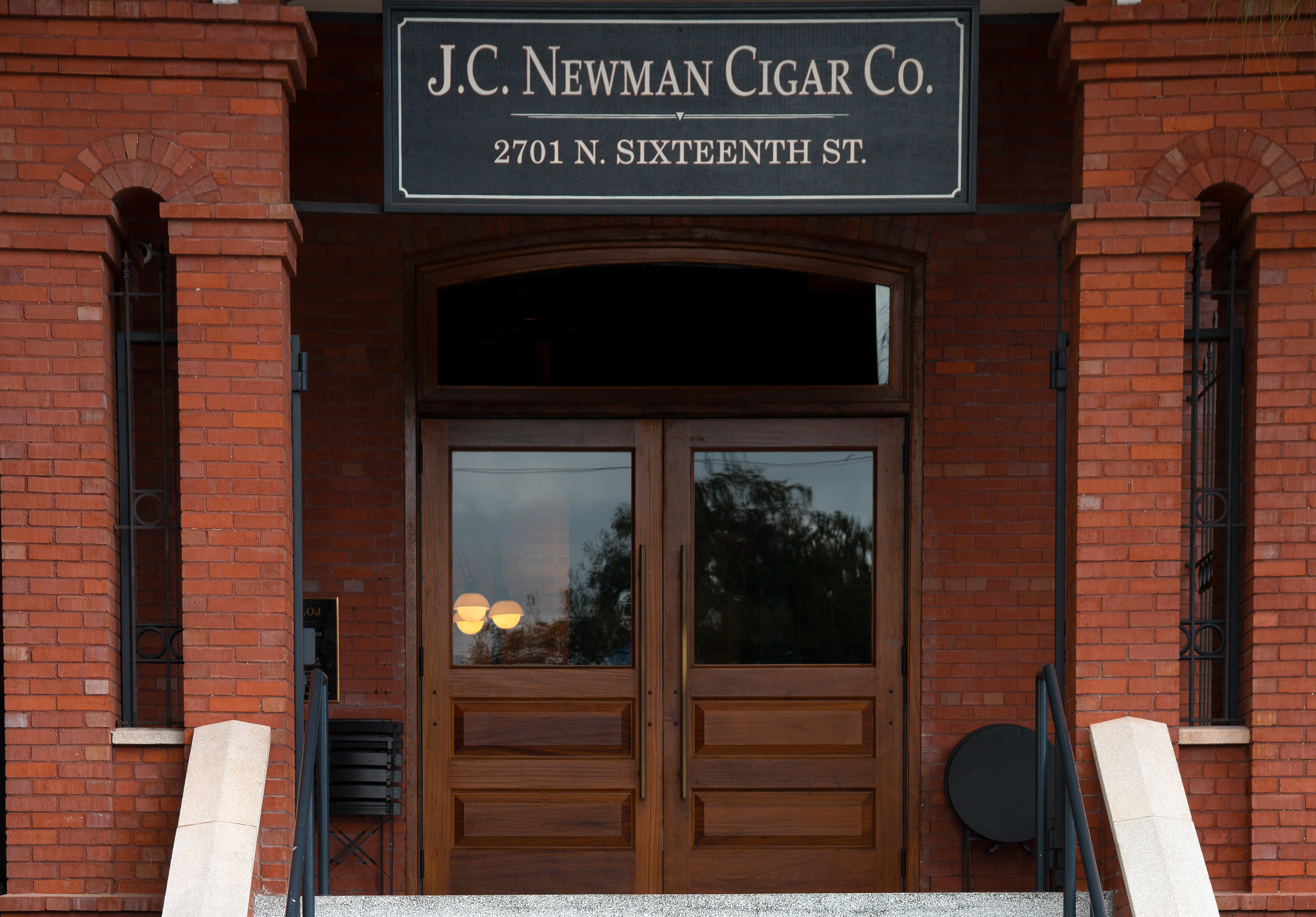
The Tampa location, in January 2023

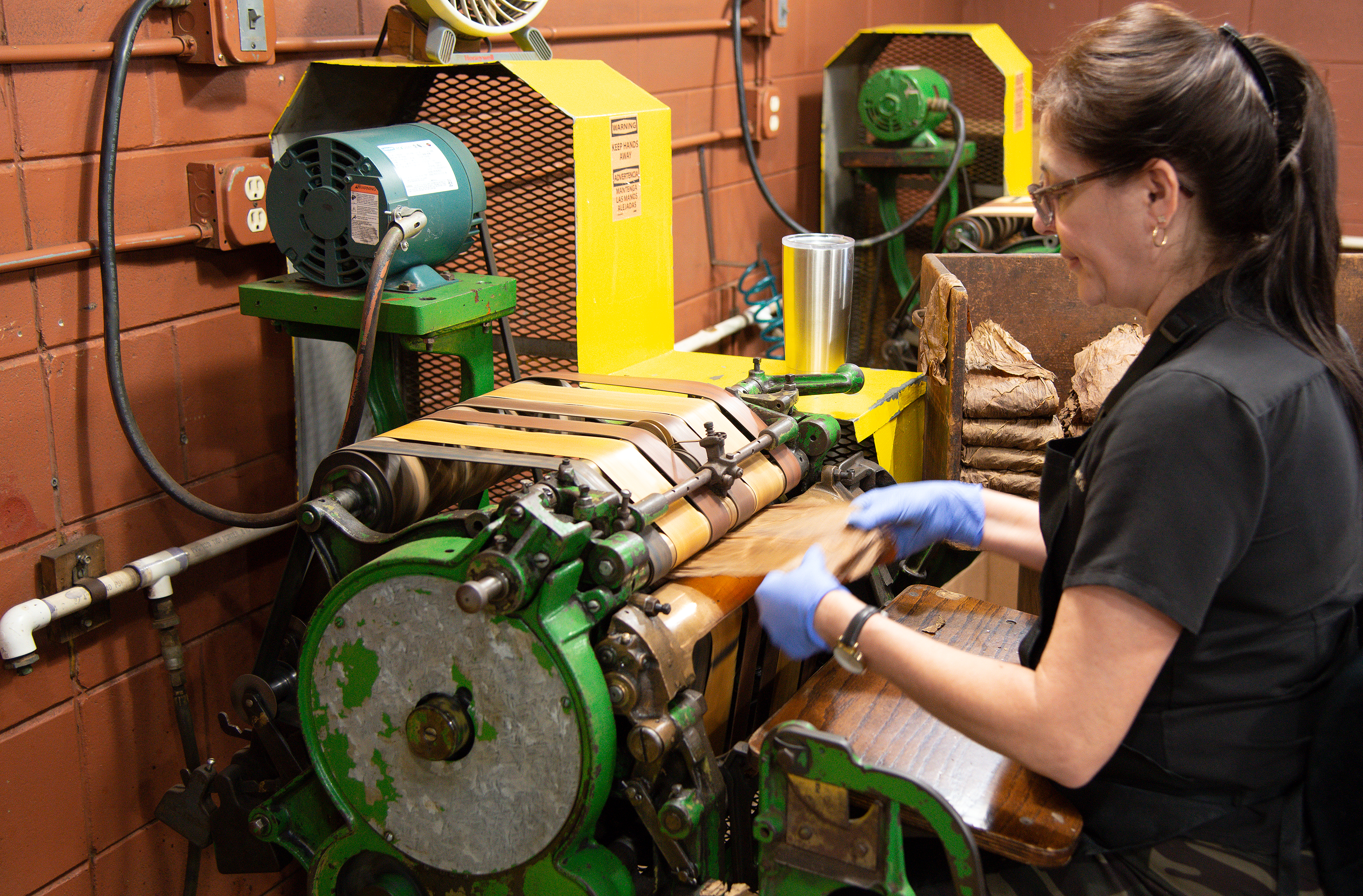
As of 2023, the 1930s machines remained in use

- J.C. Newman was the first to package cigars in cellophane tubes, now an industry standard, to protect cigars and keep them fresh.
- J.C. Newman was a director of the Cigar Manufacturers Association of American in the 1940s.
- After the United States embargo against Cuba began, J.C. Newman introduced Cameroon tobacco to the United States.
- The Cuesta-Rey Cigar Bar at Tropicana Field, home of the Tampa Bay Rays, was the first cigar bar in Major League Baseball.
- J.C. Newman operates cigar museum on the first floor of its historic Tampa factory.
- In 2001, the Newman family joined the Fuente family in creating the Cigar Family Charitable Foundation, a 501(c)(3) non-profit organization that has raised over $3 million to build schools, medical clinics, farms, and sports and recreation facilities to help the poor children of the Dominican Republic.
- J.C. Newman utilizes antique, hand-operated ARENCO and American Machine and Foundry cigarmaking machines from the 1930's in its Tampa factory.
