= Mason–Tillett House =

Historic house in Virginia, United States

- U.S. National Register of Historic Places
- Virginia Landmarks Register
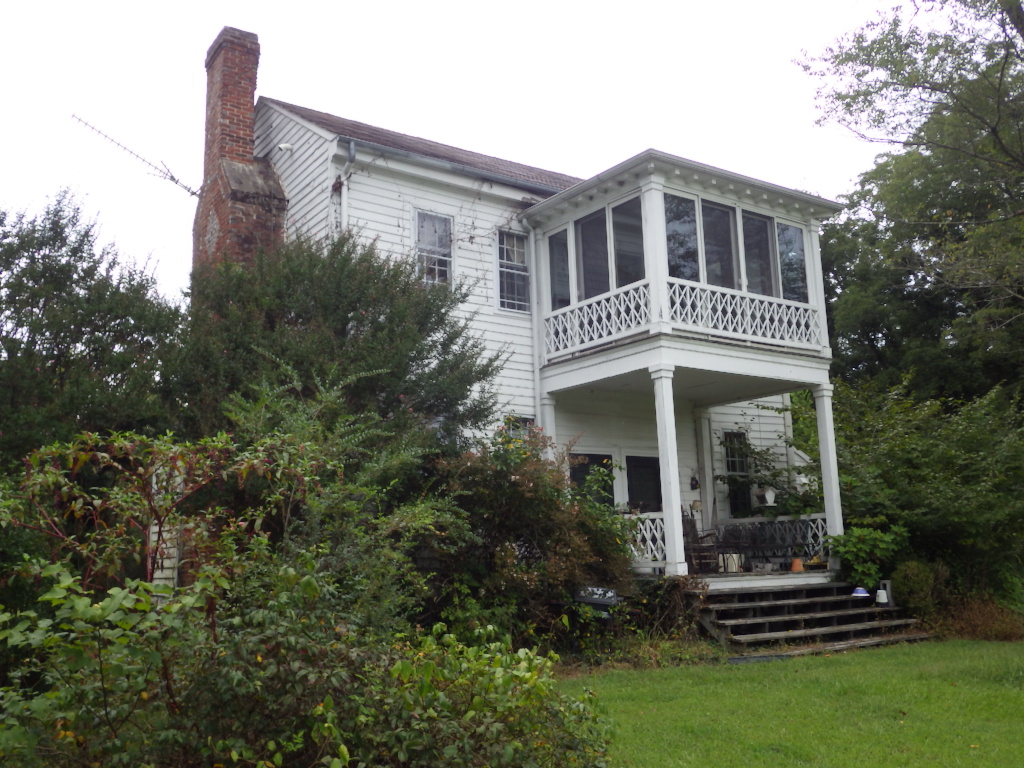

- Location within Virginia Location within the United States
- Location: 1050 Christanna Highway, Valentines, Virginia
- Coordinates: 36°33′39″N 77°48′13″W
- Area: 4.4 acres (1.8 ha)
- Built: 1780
- Architectural style: Federal
- NRHP reference No.: 03001443
- VLR No.: 012-0093

Significant dates
- Added to NRHP: January 16, 2004
- Designated VLR: September 10, 2003

Mason–Tillett House, also known as Rock Hill, Mason's, Long's Farm, and Brunswick Plantation, is a historic plantation house at Valentines, Brunswick County, Virginia. Built about 1780, it is a T-shaped, two-story frame structure with a 1 1/2-story addition added about 1832. The front facade features a two-story pedimented porch. The interior features exceptional surviving grained and marbleized woodwork. It was listed on the National Register of Historic Places in 2004.
