= Church Home for Aged, Infirm and Disabled Colored People =

Historic hospital building in Virginia, United States

- U.S. National Register of Historic Places
- U.S. Historic district
- Virginia Landmarks Register
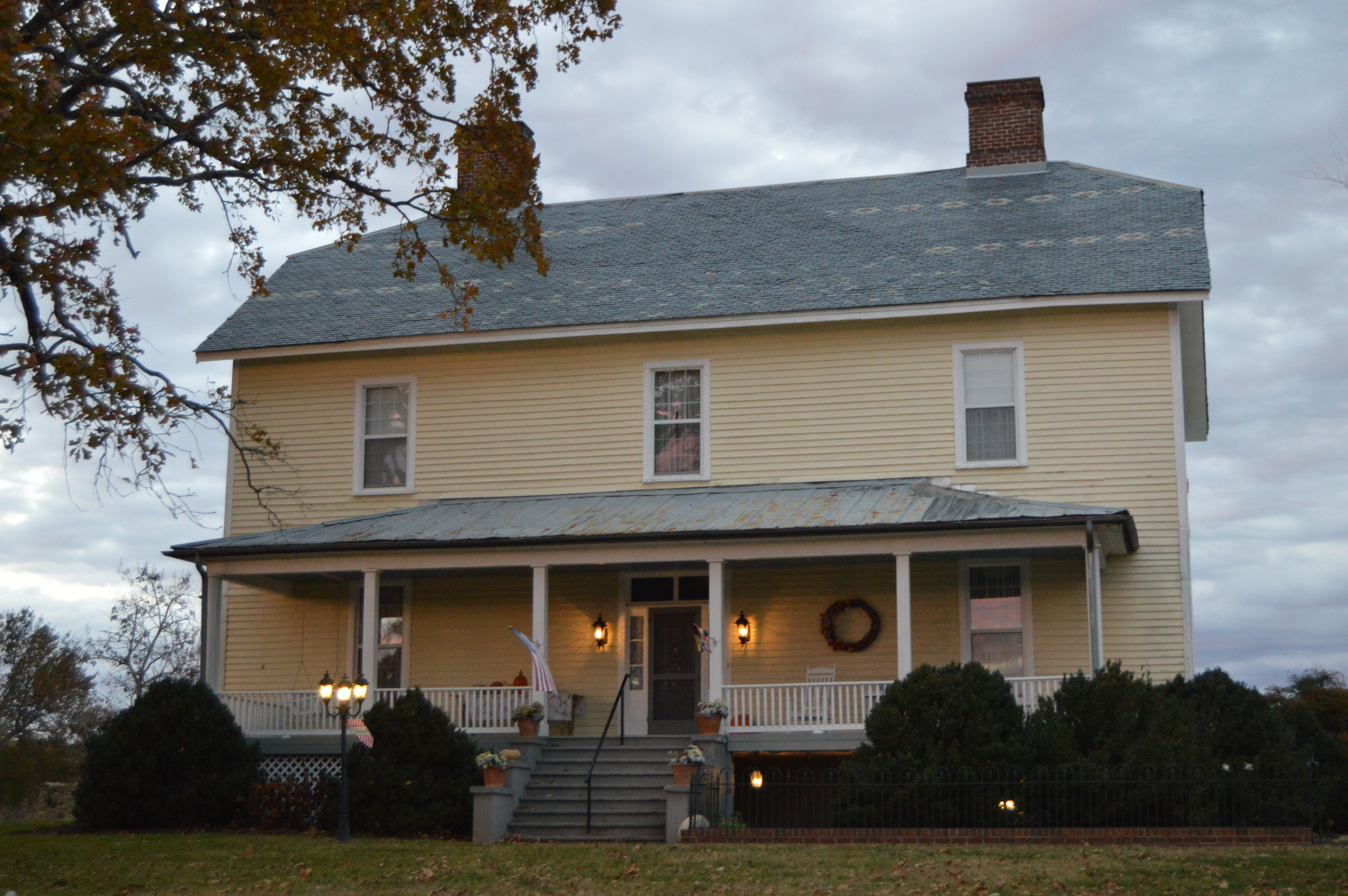
- Front of the main building

- Location within Virginia Location within the United States
- Location: 236 Pleasant Grove Rd., Brodnax, Virginia
- Coordinates: 36°44′46.5″N 77°52′51.5″W
- Area: 4.2 acres (1.7 ha)
- Built: 1881-1883
- Architectural style: Late 19th And Early 20th Century American Movements
- NRHP reference No.: 04000910
- VLR No.: 012-0126

Significant dates
- Added to NRHP: August 26, 2004
- Designated VLR: June 16, 2004

Church Home for Aged, Infirm and Disabled Colored People is a historic hospital building for African Americans located at Brodnax, Brunswick County, Virginia. It was built in 1881–1883, and is a three-story, 6,000-square-foot wood-frame structure with horizontal lapped weatherboard walls and a slate clipped-gable roof. Also on the property are a contributing hospital supervisor's residence and smokehouse. The house is now used as a bed and breakfast establishment.

It was listed on the National Register of Historic Places in 2004.
