= Brunswick County Courthouse Square =

Historic structures in Virginia, US

- U.S. National Register of Historic Places
- U.S. Historic district
- Virginia Landmarks Register
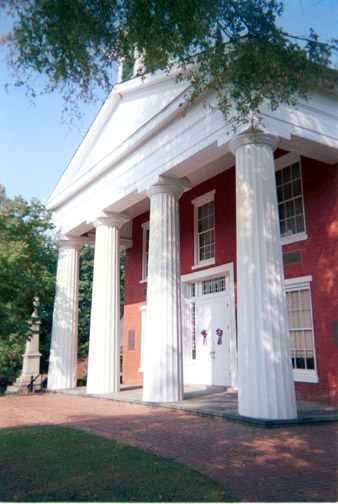
- Brunswick County Courthouse, May 2002

- Location within Virginia Location within the United States
- Location: 202, 216, 228, 234 North Main St., Lawrenceville, Virginia
- Coordinates: 36°45′30″N 77°50′49″W
- Area: 1.6 acres (0.65 ha)
- Built: 1854-1855, 1893, 1911, 1941
- Architect: Turnbull, E.R.; Kirkland, Robert; Dimmock, Moseley, Browne, Dalgliesh
- Architectural style: Greek Revival, Colonial Revival
- NRHP reference No.: 74002110
- VLR No.: 251-0001

Significant dates
- Added to NRHP: December 31, 1974
- Designated VLR: November 19, 1974, December 17, 2009

Brunswick County Courthouse Square is a historic county courthouse complex and national historic district located at Lawrenceville, Brunswick County, Virginia. It encompasses four contributing buildings and two contributing objects. They are the courthouse building, a clerk's office, library, jail, Confederate war monument, and a simple granite slab monument commemorating the county's veterans of World War I to the Vietnam War. Together they constitute a classic Southern courthouse square. The courthouse was built in 1854–55, as a two-story, gable-roofed rectangular brick building in the Greek Revival style. In 1939, a rear brick addition was completed, creating a T-shaped plan. The clerk's office is a two-story brick building built in 1893, with rear additions built in 1924 and 1939. The library was built in 1941.

The complex was listed on the National Register of Historic Places in 1974. It is located in the Lawrenceville Historic District.
