= Arturo Fuente =

American cigar brand

Official logo

Arturo Fuente is a cigar brand founded by Arturo Fuente, Sr. in 1912 in West Tampa, Florida. Following a catastrophic fire in 1924, the brand had a production freeze for 22 years, reemerging in 1946 on a limited, local basis. Ownership was transferred to Arturo's younger son, Carlos Fuente, Sr. in 1958. Following the 1960 United States embargo of Cuba, the Fuente brand began a period of slow and steady growth, emerging as one of the most critically acclaimed makers of hand-rolled premium cigars outside of Cuba. As of 2010, the company was producing 30 million cigars annually at its factory in the Dominican Republic.

== History ==
=== Establishment ===
The Arturo Fuente cigar brand was launched by 24-year-old Cuban émigré Arturo Fuente (November 18, 1887 – February 11, 1973) in West Tampa, Florida in 1912. Fuente had come to the United States in 1902, leaving his hometown of Güines, Cuba, in the aftermath of the Spanish–American War.

The original three-story wooden A. Fuente & Co. factory was one of nearly 200 facilities in the city importing tobacco from nearby Cuba for production into finished cigars.

The company was incorporated in 1924, by which time A. Fuente & Co. had expanded to 500 workers. However late in 1924 disaster struck, and its building burned to the ground. Production of the brand was halted for the next 22 years.

=== 1946 reestablishment ===
By the end of World War II Arturo Fuente had finally recovered from the catastrophic losses suffered in 1924 fire and the Great Depression had abated, making a return to cigar manufacturing again conceivable. Fuente relaunched his brand "in the garage," so to speak—adding a few rolling tables to the 160 square foot back porch of his home in Ybor City, Florida.

Production was a family affair at the time of the 1946 restart, with Arturo and his wife rolling full-time, joined by a few other hired torcedores. Arturo's sons—Carlos and Arturo, Jr.—were soon drafted into the enterprise, sweeping the floors and helping with the rolling after school.

Carlos - later Carlos Fuente, Sr. - contracted polio as a boy of 12 but unlike many victims of the disease was fortunate in recovering well enough to walk normally. He dropped out before graduating high school and was married at age 18. Because the area cigar business struggled during the 1940s and 1950s, Carlos took a job as a baker while his wife worked full-time in another factory and both moonlighted at Fuente.

Throughout the 1950s Fuente remained exclusively a local Tampa brand, with the company's entire production sold there on a cash-and-carry basis.

=== Sale to Carlos Fuente ===
Arturo Fuente, Sr. had originally envisioned passing the small family cigar business on to his eldest son, Arturo, Junior, but younger son Carlos spent more time working in the firm. In 1958 Carlos bought the business, which made only a few thousand cigars a year, for $1—including $1,161 in assets and no debt.

Carlos, Sr. was ambitious and sought to expand the business, first seeking to establish new accounts in other parts of Florida before setting his sights on the large cigar market of New York City. Fuente initially targeted the state's Hispanic population, but growth was slow because cuban cigars made by manufacturers were widely available, and cigar smokers of the era were brand loyal.

The United States embargo against Cuba would change all that.

=== After the embargo ===
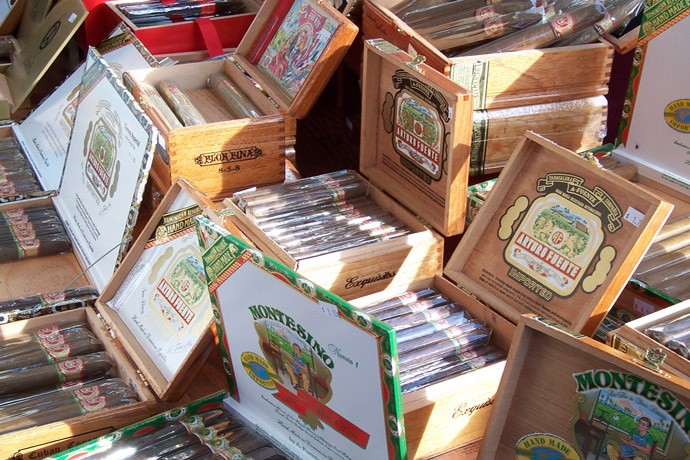
Arturo Fuente cigar boxes at 2005 Tampa Cigar Heritage Festival. The Montesino cigars are also produced by Tabacalera A. Fuente y Cia.

Up until the 1962 embargo, cigars were typically made in the United States of Cuban tobacco. Following the embargo, access to Cuban tobacco was abruptly terminated, forcing every cigar maker to change the blends that they used. Carlos Fuente, Sr. later recalled:

"In the old days, people were very brand true. Brand loyal. ... I feel the embargo put everybody level. People had to shop around to find a different taste that they liked."

Fuente began buying leaf from new regions like Puerto Rico and Colombia, which were blended to appeal to smokers used to classic Havano flavors.

During the 1960s, rising labor costs made continued American production uneconomical. In addition, the company had increasing difficulty in finding qualified cigar rollers in Florida. Efforts were made to establish the brand's production in Mexico and Puerto Rico, but quality from these factories proved inadequate.

In the 1970s contacts were made between Carlos Fuente, Sr. and a representative of the blossoming cigar industry in the Central American nation of Nicaragua. The company soon moved its production to Estelí in the country's northwest. However, disaster again struck in 1979 when the Fuente factory was burned to the ground during the Nicaraguan Revolution.

With Nicaragua a total loss, Carlos Fuente, Sr. mortgaged his house to raise capital and his son Carlos, Jr. added what he could and the family moved to the Dominican Republic to begin anew. Carlos Fuente, Sr. later recalled the decision to build inventory as decisive:

"When I first started in the Dominican, all our profit, we stuck it back. All our profit was always invested in tobacco. And aged tobacco is the most important thing that you can have. We always had a lot of aged tobacco. And as we started aging more and more, we started doing better."

In September 1980 Tabacalera A. Fuente opened a 12,000 square foot factory in Santiago Dominican Republic.

The company scored its first success of its "Dominican Period" in the middle 1980s with the launch of the medium-bodied Hemingways line — an attempt to break new ground in the market through the use of special shapes.

At the end of the 1980s the company began to grow its own tobacco on a substantial scale for the first time, investing in roads and curing barns. The company even took on the challenge of growing its own wrapper leaf—the most difficult and risky component of a cigar to produce.

=== Company today ===
As of 2010, Carlos Fuente, Sr. and his son Carlos Fuente, Jr. oversaw an operation that produced more than 30 million cigars per year. Carlos Fuente, Sr. died August 5, 2016, in Tampa at the age of 81.

== Specific products ==
The Arturo Fuente line of cigars ranges from the inexpensive to the premium.

The full-bodied Fuente Fuente Opus X, introduced to the market in November 1995, is the company's "top of the brand, super premium line of cigars". The cigar is a Dominican puro (i.e. 100% grown in that one country) making use of Rosado wrapper grown by Fuente's own farm. The cigar is made in 13 vitolas ranging in size from the 4-5/8 inch by 49 ring gauge "Belicoso XXX" to the massive 9 1/4-inch by 47 "Perfecxion A." The cigar achieved great critical success, with the corona size named as Cigar Aficionado magazine's 2005 Cigar of the Year and the Belicoso XXX rated by that publication as the world's number 3 release in 2010.

In 2004 Cuban-American actor and director Andy García contacted Carlos Fuente, Jr. seeking to film scenes for the film The Lost City in the Fuente tobacco fields. The film was scheduled to shoot in July of that year, however—a time after the crop had already been harvested. To provide a setting for the film 15 acres were planted by Fuente in tobacco during what would ordinarily have been the off season. The resulting special crop—harvested, cured, and manufactured for first release in 2009 — was very successfully marketed as the Opus X Lost City Edition. Five vitolas of this special edition were produced in 2010, with very limited productions ranging from 4,000 to 12,000 cigars per size.

== Other manufacturing ==
Arturo Fuente is the manufacturer of the Ashton brand, established in 1985 by Robert Levin of Philadelphia, Pennsylvania.

The company also makes some of the cigars sold by the J.C. Newman Cigar Company of Tampa, Florida. J.C. Newman returns the favor, handling the production of all of Arturo Fuente's machine-made product.

Arturo Fuente partnered with Swiss watchmaker Hublot to release several watches dedicated to their cigars: the Hublot King Power Arturo Fuente in 2012, and the Hublot Classic Fusion ForbiddenX in 2014.

== See also ==
- List of cigar brands

== Product list ==
- Arturo Fuente
- Arturo Fuente 8-5-8
- Arturo Fuente Añejo
- Arturo Fuente Don Carlos
- Arturo Fuente Rosado Sungrown Magnum R
- Brevas Royale
- Casa Cuba
- Chateau De La Fuente
- Curly Head
- Fuente Fuente Opus X
- Hemingway series
- Opus X Lost City Edition
- Montesino cigars by Arturo Fuente
