= St. Paul's School (Virginia) =

- U.S. National Register of Historic Places
- U.S. Historic district
- Virginia Landmarks Register
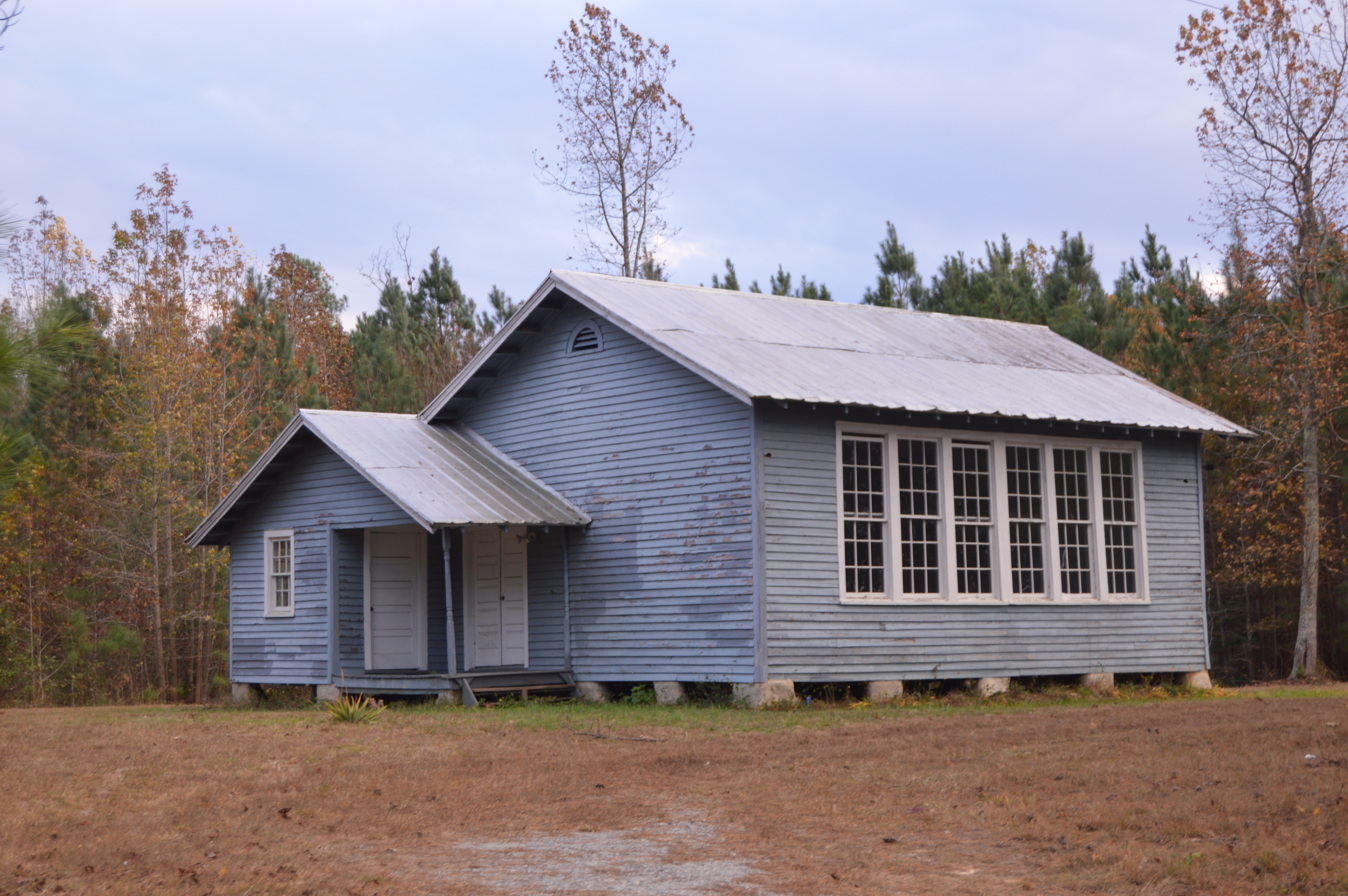
- Roadside view of the school

- Location within Virginia Location within the United States
- Location: Brunswick Dr. at I-85, Meredithville, Virginia
- Coordinates: 36°49′31″N 77°57′30″W
- Area: 2 acres (0.81 ha)
- Built: 1917
- MPS: Rosenwald Schools in Virginia MPS
- NRHP reference No.: 04000037
- VLR No.: 012-5010

Significant dates
- Added to NRHP: June 4, 2004
- Designated VLR: December 3, 2003

St. Paul's School, also known as St. Paul's Chapel School, is a historic Rosenwald school building for African Americans located at Meredithville, Brunswick County, Virginia. It was built in 1920, and is a one-room school measuring approximately 20 feet by 40 feet. It is of wood-frame construction, sheathed in un-beaded weatherboards, and covered by a standing seam metal roof.

It was listed on the National Register of Historic Places in 2004.
