= Lawrenceville Historic District =

Historic district in Virginia, United States

- U.S. National Register of Historic Places
- U.S. Historic district
- Virginia Landmarks Register
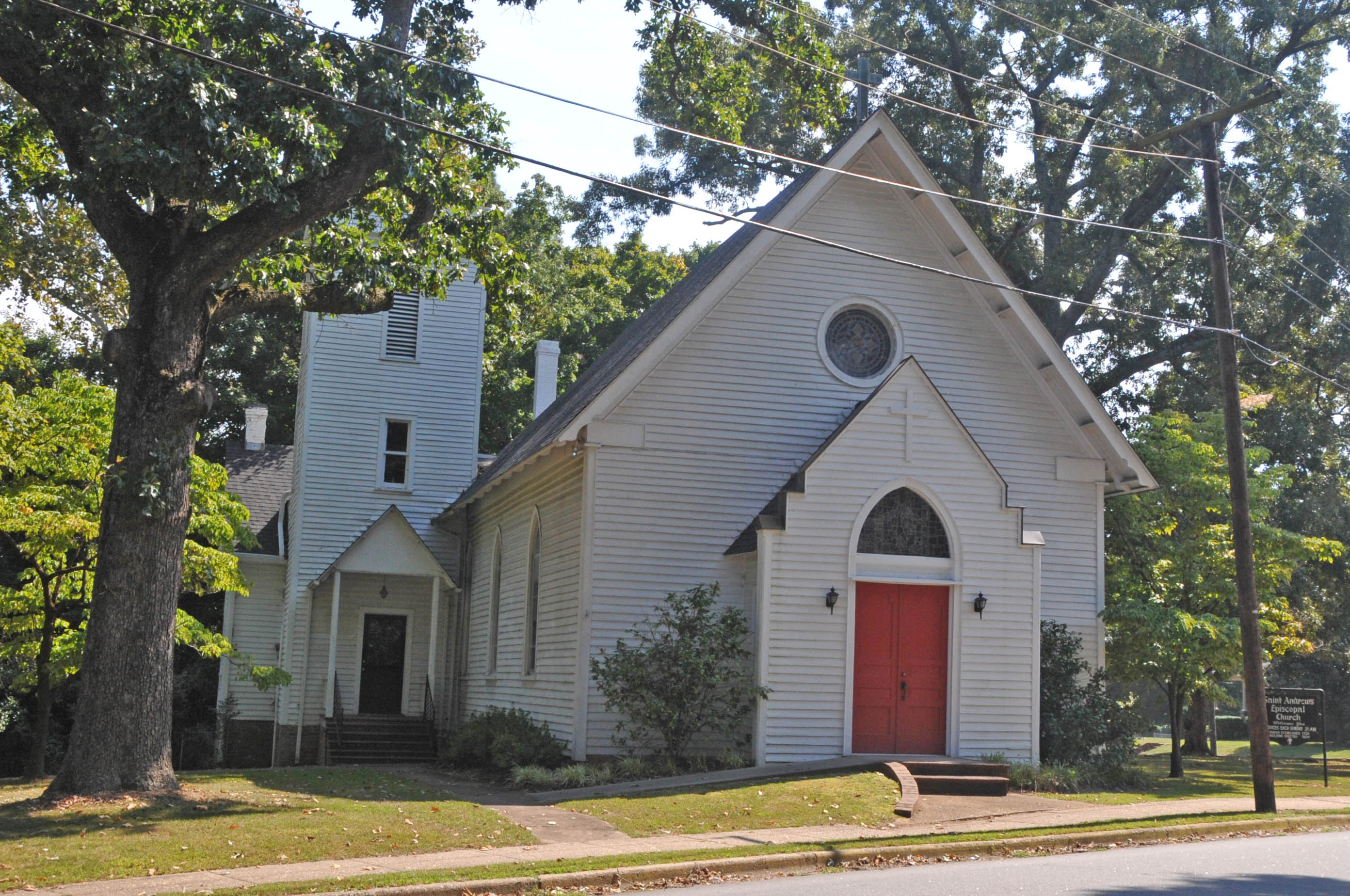
- Saint Andrew's Episcopal Church, Lawrenceville Historic District, March 2007

- Location within Virginia Location within the United States
- Location: Roughly bounded by W. Sixth Ave., Maria St., Lawrenceville townline, Rose Creek, and Thomas St., Lawrenceville, Virginia
- Coordinates: 36°45′31″N 77°50′53″W
- Area: 285 acres (115 ha)
- Built: 1781
- Architectural style: Greek Revival, Gothic Revival, et al.
- NRHP reference No.: 00000313
- VLR No.: 251-5001

Significant dates
- Added to NRHP: April 13, 2000
- Designated VLR: September 15, 1999

Lawrenceville Historic District is a national historic district located at Lawrenceville, Brunswick County, Virginia. It encompasses 326 contributing buildings, 1 contributing site, 3 contributing structures, and 1 contributing object in the central business district and surrounding residential areas of Lawrenceville. Notable buildings include Saint Andrew's Episcopal Church (1829), Lawrenceville Methodist Church, and Lawrenceville Baptist Church (1901). Located in the district and separately listed are the Brunswick County Courthouse Square and Saint Paul's College.

It was listed on the National Register of Historic Places in 2000.
