= Brodnax, Virginia =

- Town
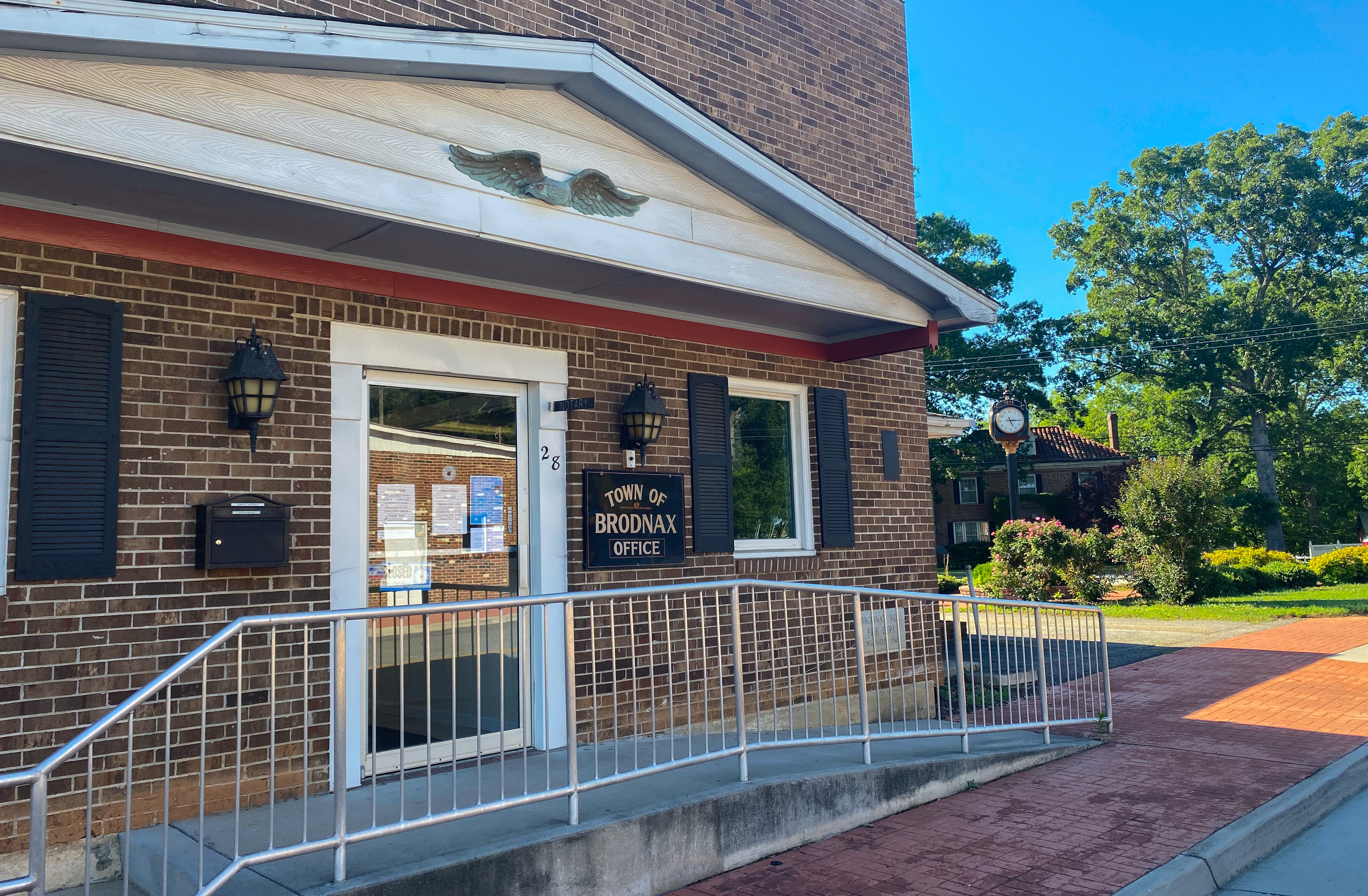
- Brodnax Town building on Main Street

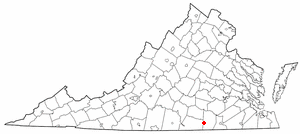
- Location of Brodnax, Virginia
- Coordinates: 36°42′12″N 78°1′54″W
- Country: United States
- State: Virginia
- Counties: Brunswick, Mecklenburg
- Incorporated: 1915
- Named after: William Henry Brodnax

Government
  - Mayor: Don Dugger

Area
  - Total: 0.71 sq mi (1.84 km^{2})
  - Land: 0.71 sq mi (1.83 km^{2})
  - Water: 0.0077 sq mi (0.02 km^{2})
- Elevation: 410 ft (125 m)

Population (2020)
  - Total: 283
  - Density: 401/sq mi (155/km^{2})
- Time zone: UTC−5 (Eastern (EST))
  - Summer (DST): UTC−4 (EDT)
- ZIP code: 23920
- Area code: 434
- FIPS code: 51-10072
- GNIS feature ID: 1463870

Brodnax is a town in Brunswick and Mecklenburg counties in the U.S. state of Virginia. The population was 283 at the 2020 census.

== History ==
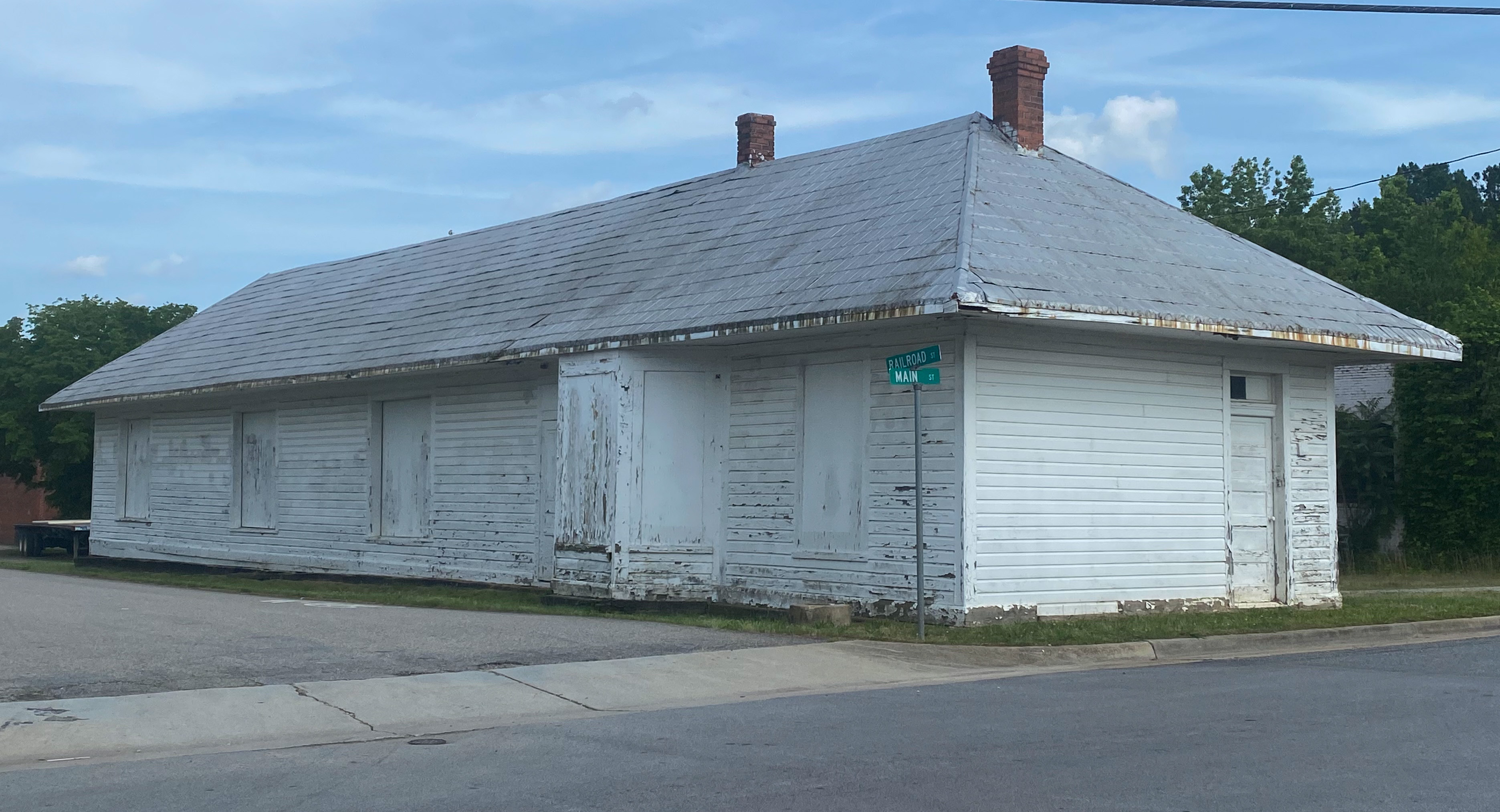
Brodnax Train Station on the Atlantic and Danville Railway

Brodnax, Virginia was a stop on the Atlantic and Danville Railway. Due to Virginia Law, alcoholic spirits could not be sold on the Atlantic and Danville Railway train within two miles of Brodnax in 1896. The Southern Railway Company, which leased the A&D starting in 1899, made significant improvements to the passenger depot in Brodnax in 1904. Today, the Tobacco Heritage Trail runs through the town on the old Atlantic and Danville Railway.

The Church Home for Aged, Infirm and Disabled Colored People was listed on the National Register of Historic Places in 2004.

== Geography ==
Brodnax is located on the border of Brunswick and Mecklenburg counties at 36°42′12″N 78°1′54″W (36.703422, −78.031570). U.S. Route 58 passes through the town, leading west 6 miles (10 km) to South Hill and Interstate 85 and east 30 miles (48 km) to Emporia and Interstate 95.

According to the United States Census Bureau, the town has a total area of 0.71 square miles (1.84 km^{2}), of which 0.71 square miles (1.83 km^{2}) is land and 0.008 square miles (0.02 km^{2}), or 0.94%, is water.

== Demographics ==
Historical population
Census	Pop.	Note	%±
1920	235		—
1930	365		55.3%
1940	536		46.8%
1950	499		−6.9%
1960	561		12.4%
1970	569		1.4%
1980	492		−13.5%
1990	388		−21.1%
2000	317		−18.3%
2010	298		−6.0%
2020	283		−5.0%
U.S. Decennial Census

=== Racial and ethnic composition ===
Brodnax town, Virginia – Racial and ethnic composition Note: the US Census treats Hispanic/Latino as an ethnic category. This table excludes Latinos from the racial categories and assigns them to a separate category. Hispanics/Latinos may be of any race.
Race / Ethnicity (NH = Non-Hispanic)	Pop 2000	Pop 2010	Pop 2020	% 2000	% 2010	% 2020
White alone (NH)	158	159	150	49.84%	53.36%	53.00%
Black or African American alone (NH)	153	127	96	48.26%	42.62%	33.92%
Native American or Alaska Native alone (NH)	0	0	3	0.00%	0.00%	1.06%
Asian alone (NH)	0	0	2	0.00%	0.00%	0.71%
Native Hawaiian or Pacific Islander alone (NH)	0	0	0	0.00%	0.00%	0.00%
Other race alone (NH)	0	0	1	0.00%	0.00%	0.35%
Mixed race or Multiracial (NH)	0	3	14	0.00%	1.01%	4.95%
Hispanic or Latino (any race)	6	9	17	1.89%	3.02%	6.01%
Total	317	298	283	100.00%	100.00%	100.00%

=== 2020 census ===
At the 2000 census there were 317 people, 122 households, and 80 families living in the town. The population density was 450.1 people per square mile (173.8 people/km^{2}). There were 139 housing units at an average density of 197.4 units per square mile (76.2 units/km^{2}). The racial makeup of the town was 51.42% White and 48.58% African American. Hispanic or Latino of any race were 1.89%.

Of the 122 households 27.9% had children under the age of 18 living with them, 47.5% were married couples living together, 16.4% had a female householder with no husband present, and 34.4% were non-families. 30.3% of households were one person and 18.0% were one person aged 65 or older. The average household size was 2.60 and the average family size was 3.29.

The age distribution was 26.2% under the age of 18, 6.3% from 18 to 24, 27.8% from 25 to 44, 21.1% from 45 to 64, and 18.6% 65 or older. The median age was 39 years. For every 100 females, there were 86.5 males. For every 100 females age 18 and over, there were 82.8 males.

The median household income was $24,706 and the median family income was $38,750. Males had a median income of $22,045 versus $19,250 for females. The per capita income for the town was $14,785. About 10.8% of families and 18.3% of the population were below the poverty line, including 30.5% of those under age 18 and 20.3% of those age 65 or over.
