= Brick House (cigar) =

Brand of cigars made in Nicaragua

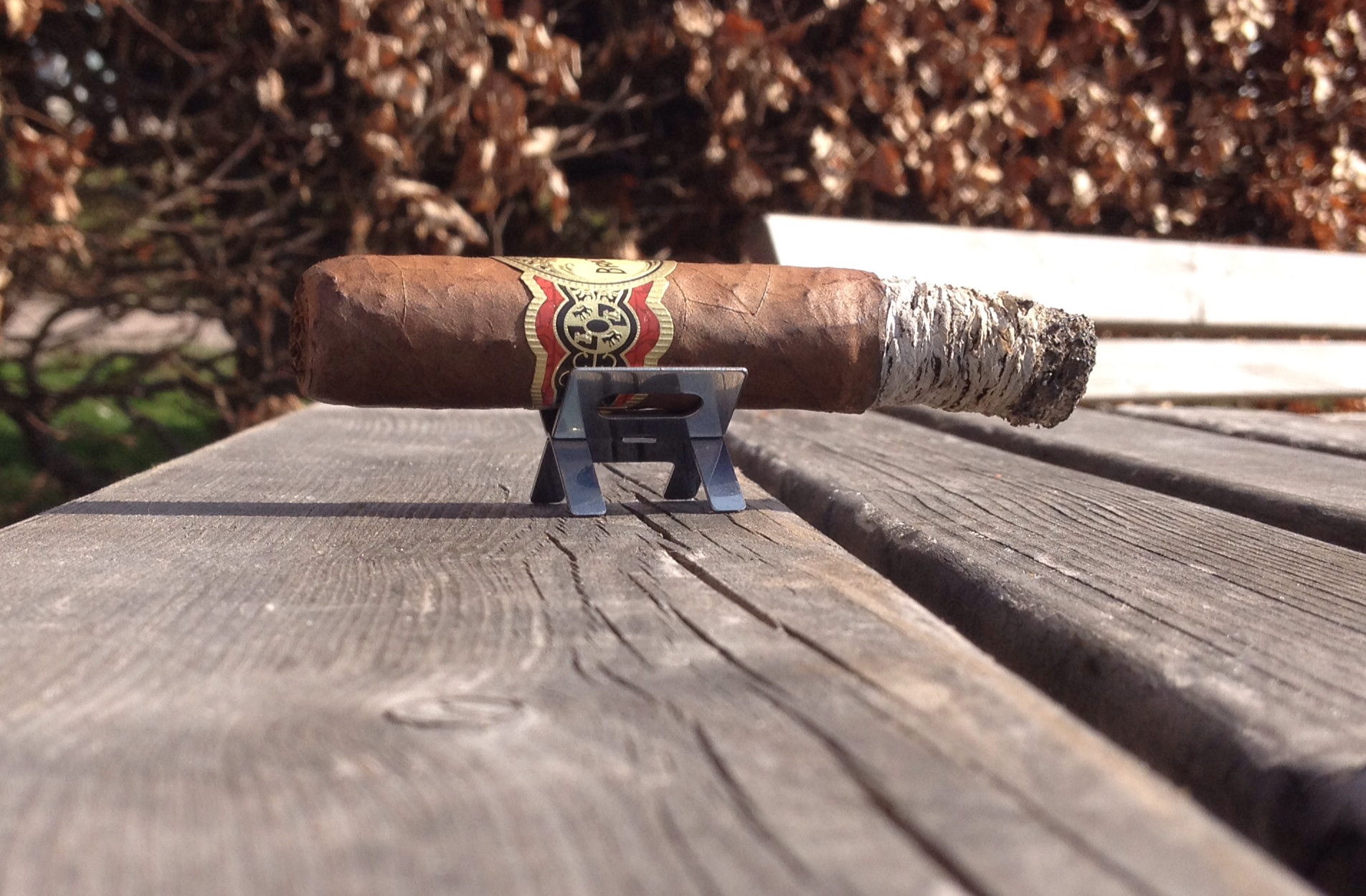
Brick House Robusto

Brick House (or Brick House Cigars) is a brand of cigars handmade in Nicaragua by the J.C. Newman Cigar Company.

== History ==
The Brick House brand was created in 1937 by Julius Caesar Newman, founder of the J.C. Newman Cigar Company. He named the cigars to honor his family home in the Hungarian countryside, a brick house that housed the Newman family residence on the top floor and a local tavern they ran on the bottom floor.

The earliest Brick House cigars were made using Cuban tobacco. The popularity of the brand declined, but in 2009 it was revived by third-generation owners Eric and Bobby Newman with the use of Nicaraguan tobaccos. The cigar has received an award of the Best Bargain Cigar of 2009 by Cigar Aficionado.

== Sizes ==
Name	Length (inches)	Ring Gauge
Corona Larga	6.25	46
Robusto	5	54
Toro	6	52
Churchill	7.25	50

== Construction ==
- Wrapper: Nicaraguan Havana Subido
- Binder: Nicaraguan
- Filler: Nicaraguan
