= Rocky Run Methodist Church =

Historic church in Virginia, United States

- U.S. National Register of Historic Places
- Virginia Landmarks Register
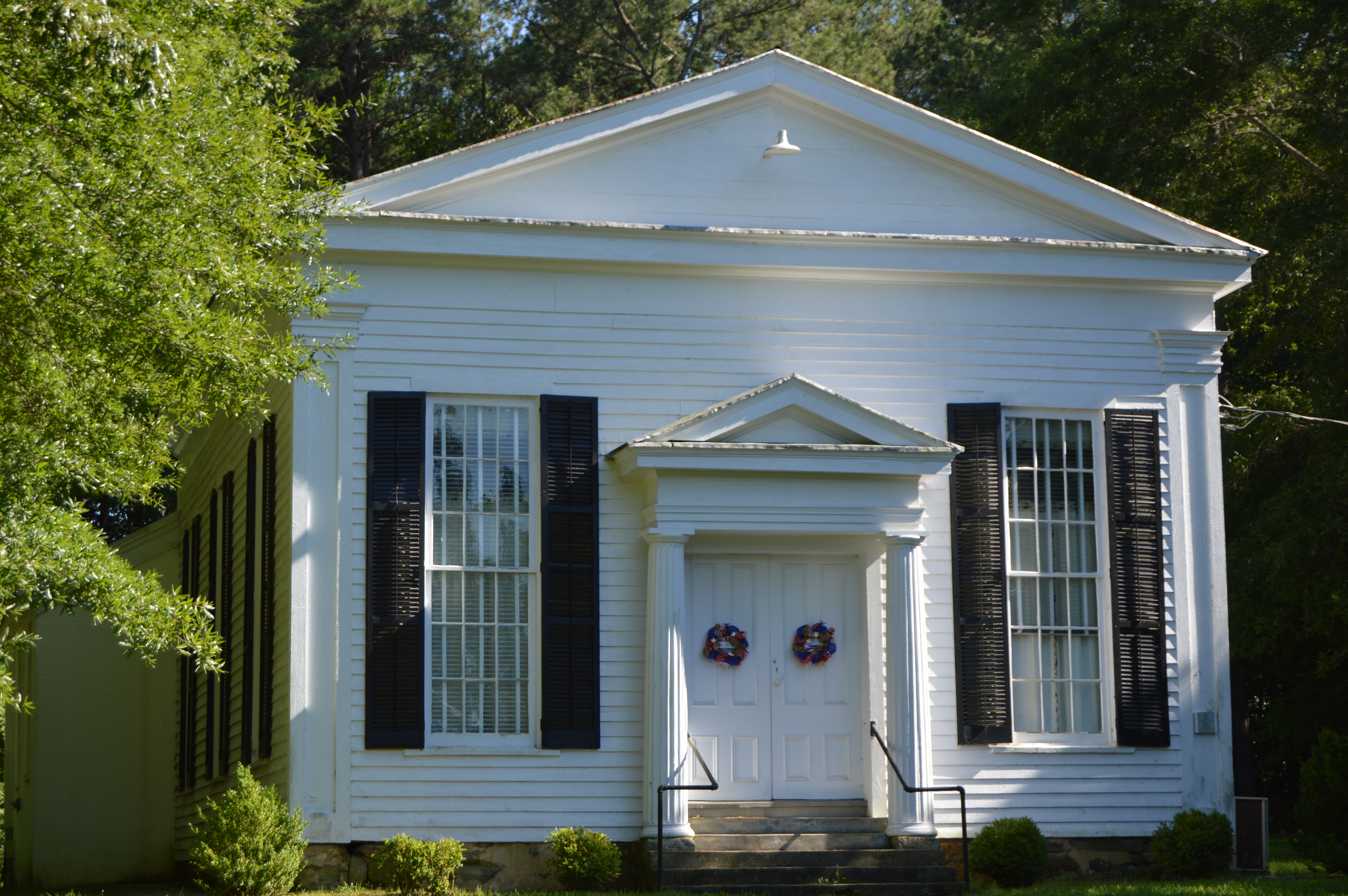
- Facade

- Location within Virginia Location within the United States
- Location: VA 616, 1.8 mi. E of jct. with VA 46, Alberta, Virginia
- Coordinates: 36°55′55″N 77°56′22″W
- Area: 4 acres (1.6 ha)
- Built: 1857
- Architect: Jefferson, Thomas (of Lynchburg)
- Architectural style: Greek Revival
- NRHP reference No.: 95000828
- VLR No.: 012-0029

Significant dates
- Added to NRHP: July 07, 1995
- Designated VLR: April 28, 1995

Rocky Run Methodist Church is a historic Methodist church in Alberta, Brunswick County, Virginia. It was built in 1857, and is a one-story, frame Greek Revival style building. It has a two-room plan consisting of a narrow narthex and a nave. The front facade features a Roman Doric distyle pedimented porch, which frames the paired, four panel door church entrance. Also on the property is a contributing privy and church cemetery.

It was listed on the National Register of Historic Places in 1995.
