= Anna Brickhouse =

American historian, author, and professor

Anna Brickhouse is an American historian, author, and professor. She currently teaches at the University of Virginia, where she also serves as the Director of American Studies. In 2015 Brickhouse won Early American Literature's inaugural book prize for her work The Unsettlement of America: Translation, Interpretation, and the Story of Don Luis de Velasco, 1560-1945.

== Bibliography ==
=== Books ===
- Transamerican Literary Relations and the Nineteenth-Century Public Sphere (2005, Cambridge University Press)
- The Unsettlement of America: Translation, Interpretation, and the Story of Don Luis de Velasco, 1560-1945 (2014, Oxford University Press)

=== Articles ===
- "L’Ouragan de Flammes (The Hurricane of Flames): New Orleans and Transamerican Catastrophe, 1866/2005." (2007, American Quarterly)
- "Hemispheric Jamestown." Hemispheric American Studies, ed. Caroline Levander and Robert Levine (2008, Rutgers University Press)
- "Autobiografia de un esclavo, 'El negro mártir,' and the Revisionist Geographies of Abolitionism." American Cultural Geographies, ed. Hsuan Hsu (2007, Delaware University Press)
