= Ring gauge =

Steel cylindrical ring

A ring gauge, or ring gage, is a cylindrical ring of a thermally stable material, often steel, whose inside diameter is finished to gauge tolerance and is used for checking the external diameter of a cylindrical object.

Ring gauges are used for comparative gauging as well as for checking, calibrating, or setting of gauges or other standards. Individual ring gauges or ring gauge sets are made to variety of tolerance grades in metric and English dimensions for master, setting, or working applications.

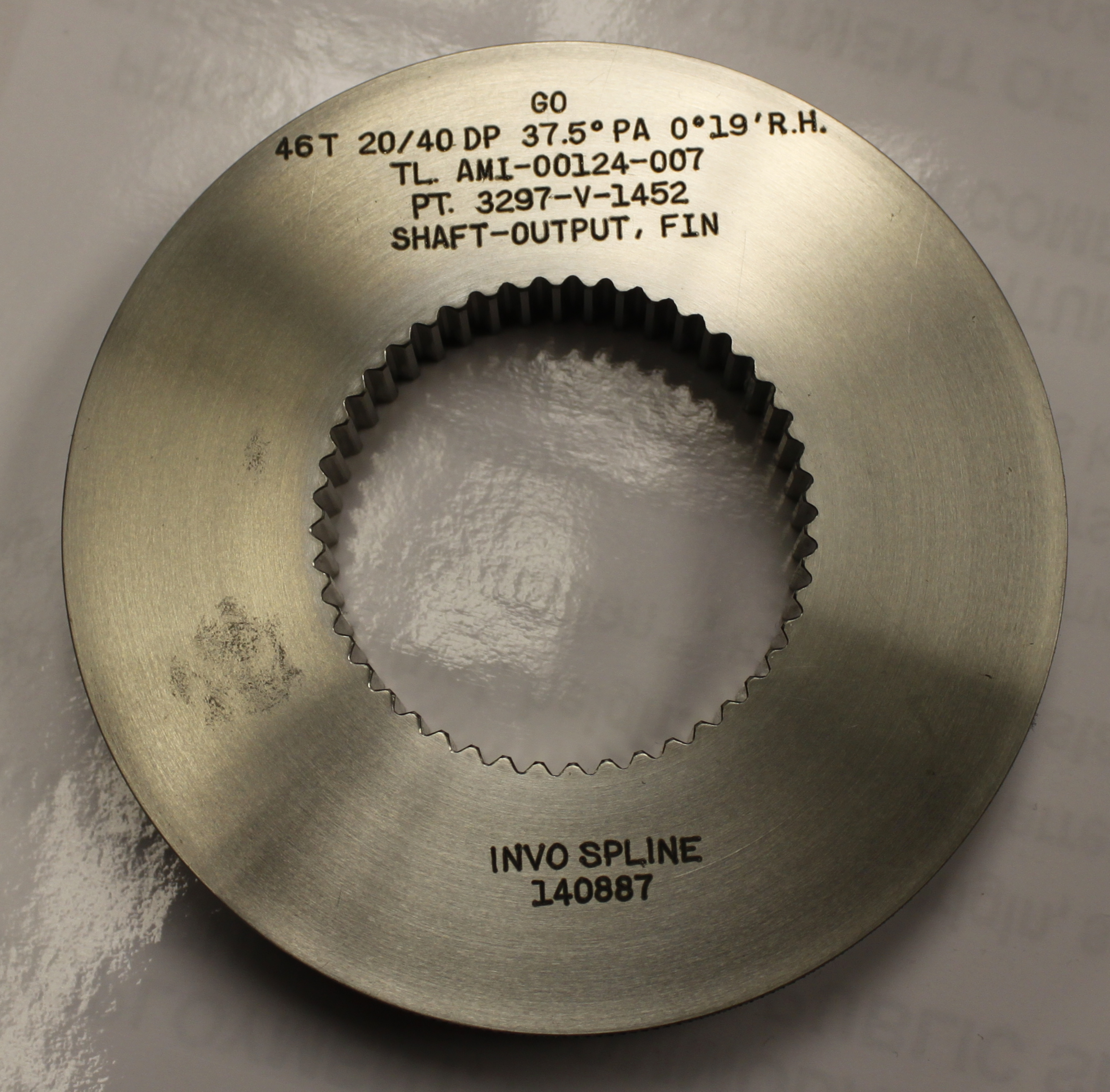
"Go" spline ring gage

There are three main types of ring gauges: go, no go, and master or setting ring gauges.

Go ring gauges provide a precision tool for production comparative gauging based on a fixed limit. Go gauges consist of a fixed limit gauge with a gauging limit based on the plus or minus tolerances of the inspected part. A go ring gauge's dimensions are based on the maximum OD tolerance of the round bar or part being gauged. A go plug gauge's dimensions are based on the minimum ID tolerance of the hole or part being gauged. The go plug (ID) gauge should be specified to a plus gaugemakers' tolerance from the minimum part tolerance. The go ring (OD) gauge should be specified to a minus gaugemakers' tolerance from the maximum part tolerance.

No-go or not-go gauges provide a precision tool for production comparative gauging based on a fixed limit. No-go gauges consist of a fixed limit gauge with a gauging limit based on the minimum or maximum tolerances of the inspected part. A no-go ring gauge's dimensions are based on the minimum OD tolerance of the round bar or part being gauged. The no go ring (OD) gauge should be specified to a plus gaugemakers' tolerance from the minimum part tolerance.

Master and setting ring gauges includes gauge blocks, master or setting discs, and setting rings are types of master gauges used to calibrate or set micrometers, optical comparators, or other gauging systems. Working gauges are used in the shop for dimensional inspection and periodically checked against a master gauge.

== Accuracy grades ==
Similar to gage blocks, ring gauges are sold under different accuracy grades. The higher the grade, the lower the allowable variance from the nominal diameter. This diameter tolerance varies, within each grade, based on the nominal diameter. US standard grades are defined per ANSI/ASME B89.1.5.
