= Meredithville, Virginia =

Unincorporated community in Virginia, United States

Coordinates: 36°48′25″N 77°57′24″W

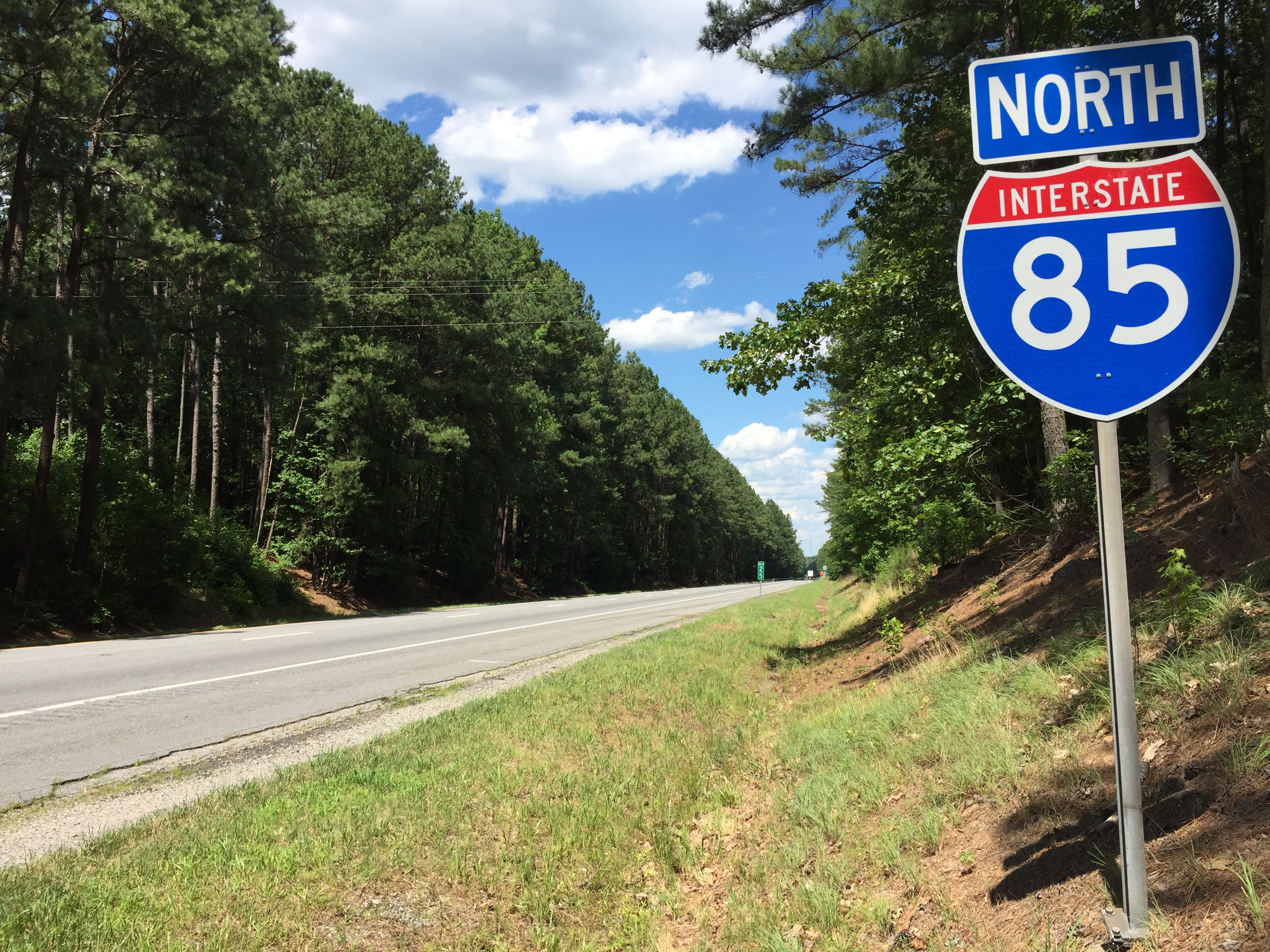
View north along Interstate 85 just north of Exit 24 (Virginia State Secondary Route 644, Meredithville) in Meredithville, Brunswick County, Virginia

Meredithville is an unincorporated community located in Brunswick County, in the U.S. state of Virginia.

St. Paul's Chapel School was listed on the National Register of Historic Places in 2004.
