= White Plains, Virginia =

Unincorporated community in Virginia, United States

Coordinates: 36°38′40″N 77°57′30″W

White Plains is an unincorporated community located in Brunswick County, in the U.S. state of Virginia.

Brick House was listed on the National Register of Historic Places in 1982.
