= Valentines, Virginia =

Unincorporated community in Virginia, United States

Coordinates: 36°35′19″N 77°49′48″W

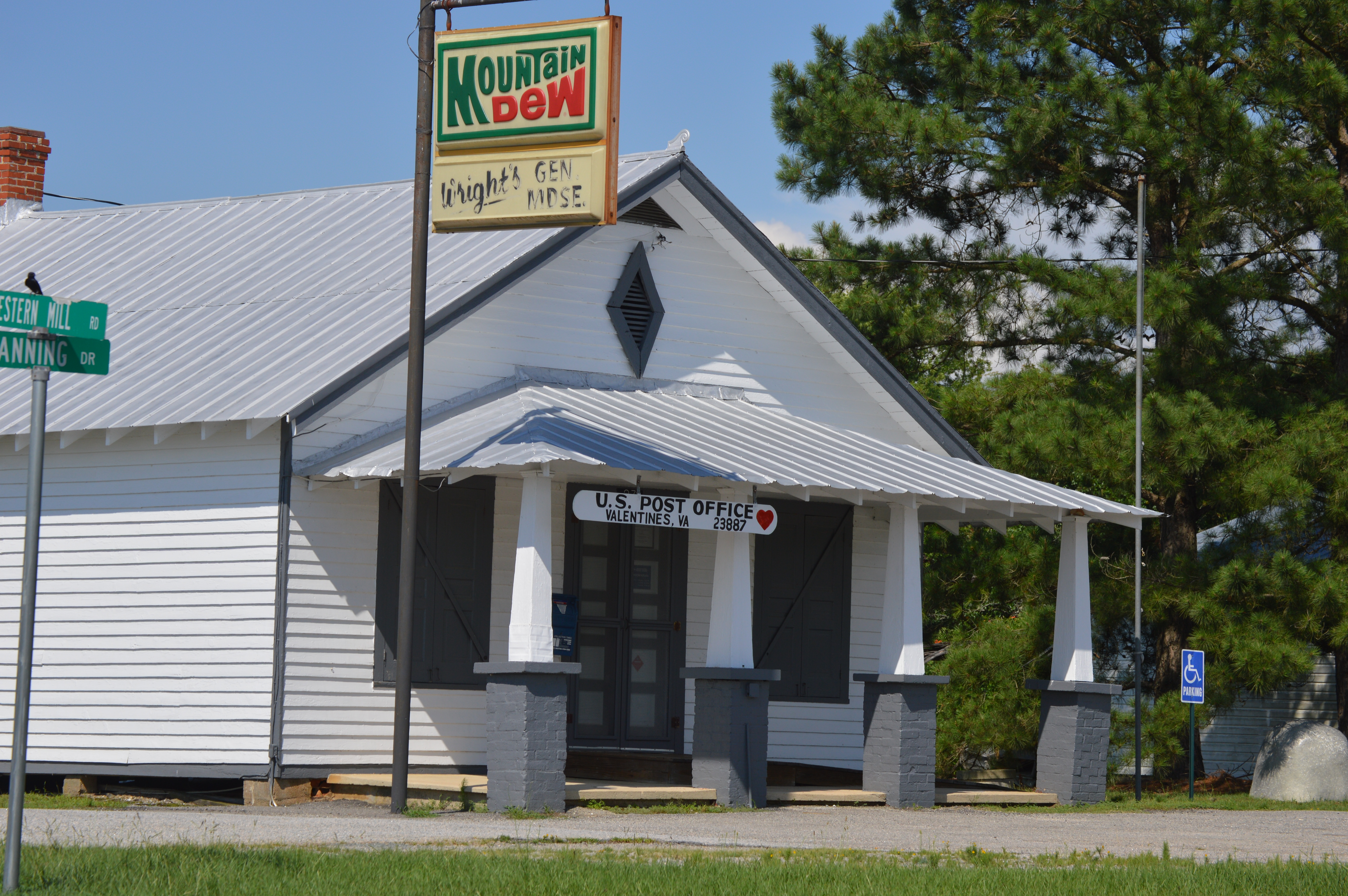
Post office

Valentines is an unincorporated community located in Brunswick County, in the U.S. state of Virginia.

Mason-Tillett House was listed on the National Register of Historic Places in 2004. There is also a combined store and post office, but no other businesses or services.
