= Brick House (White Plains, Virginia) =

Historic house in Virginia, United States

- U.S. National Register of Historic Places
- Virginia Landmarks Register
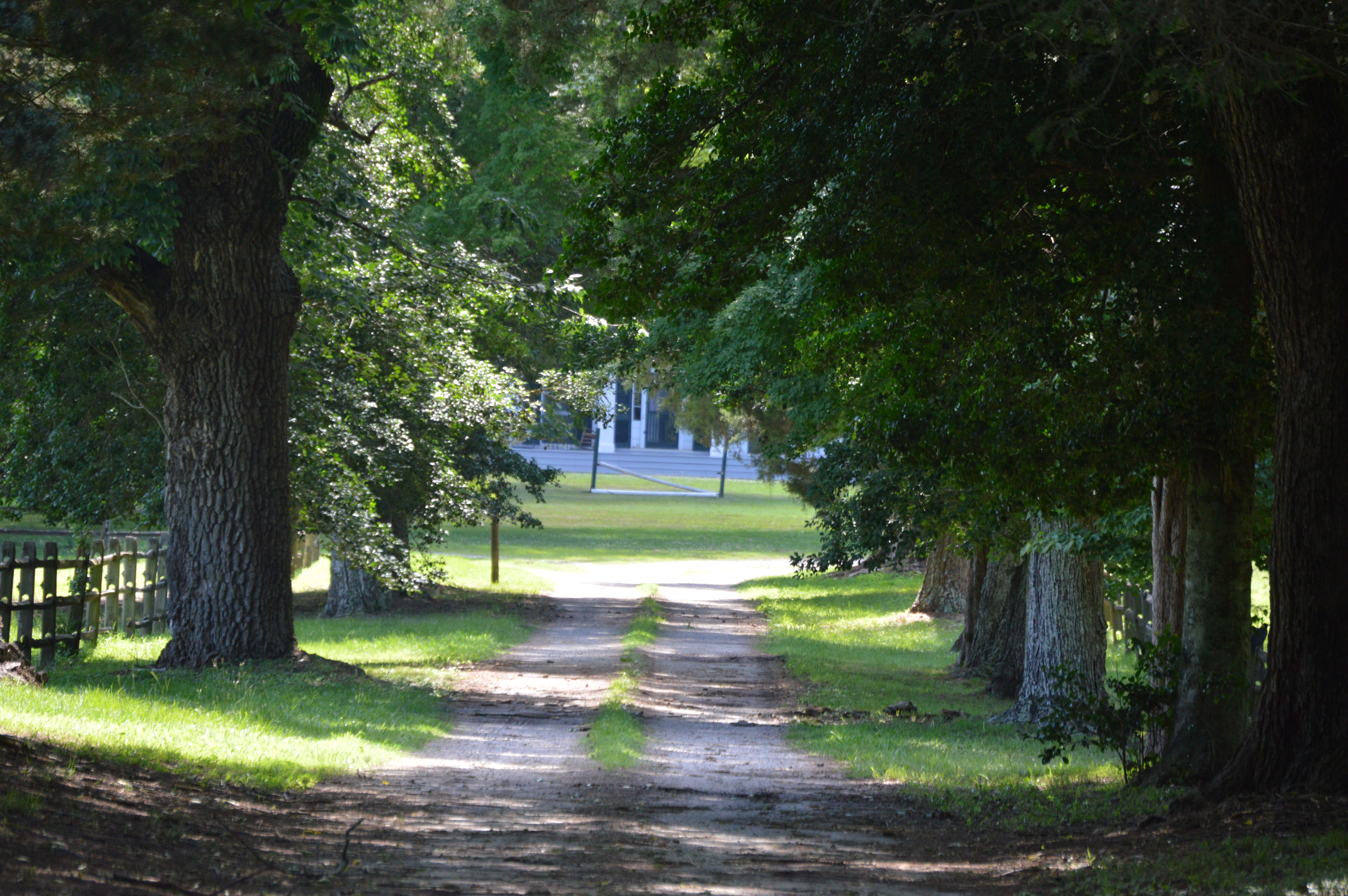
- Property entrance

- Location within Virginia Location within the United States
- Location: VA 659, west of White Plains, Virginia
- Coordinates: 36°38′56″N 77°59′16″W
- Area: 33 acres (13 ha)
- Built: c. 1831-1833, 1860
- Built by: Holt, Jacob
- NRHP reference No.: 82004544
- VLR No.: 012-0038

Significant dates
- Added to NRHP: July 8, 1982
- Designated VLR: February 16, 1982

Brick House, also known as Woodlands, is a historic plantation house located at White Plains, Brunswick County, Virginia. It was built about 1831–1833, and began as a two-story, brick I-house. It was remodeled in 1860, with the addition of the massive hexastyle portico covering the entire front facade. Also on the property is a contributing 19th-century outbuilding connected to the main house by a covered walkway.

It was listed on the National Register of Historic Places in 1982.
