= Hobson's Choice (Woodbine, Maryland) =

Historic house in Maryland, United States

- U.S. National Register of Historic Places
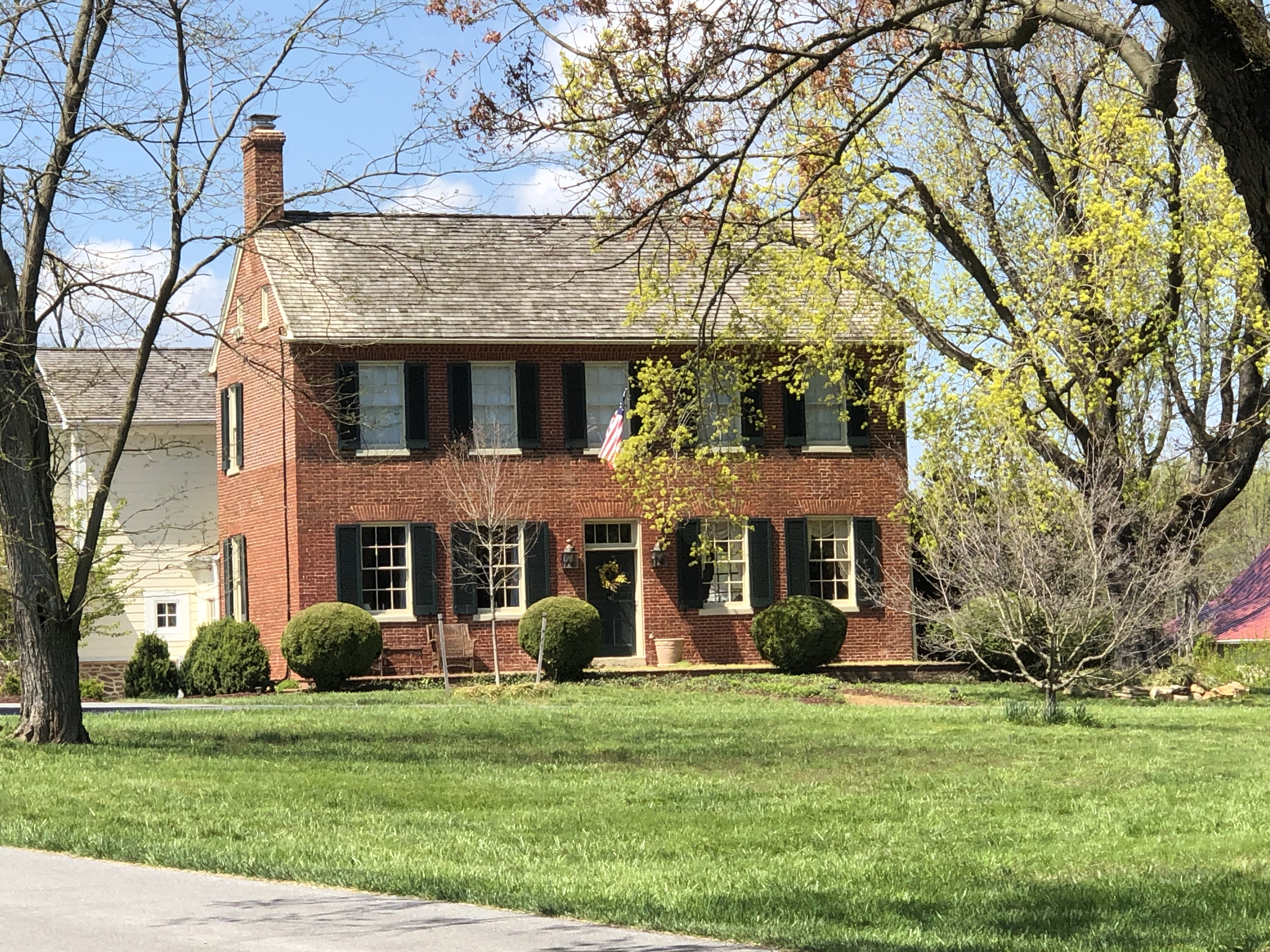

- Location within Maryland Location within the United States
- Nearest city: 3145 Florence Rd., Woodbine, Maryland
- Coordinates: 39°18′20.1″N 77°5′26.7″W
- Area: 23 acres (9.3 ha)
- Built: 1830
- Architectural style: Greek Revival, Federal
- NRHP reference No.: 84001802
- Added to NRHP: September 13, 1984

Hobson's Choice, is an historic home located at Woodbine, Howard County, Maryland. It is a five-bay, two-and-a-half-story rectangular brick house built about 1830, with a low-pitched gable roof and a recent low two-story frame rear wing. The woodwork is Greek Revival in influence.

It was listed on the National Register of Historic Places in 1984.

== See also ==
- List of Howard County properties in the Maryland Historical Trust
