= Danieltown, Virginia =

Unincorporated community in Virginia, United States

Coordinates: 36°54′17″N 77°57′35″W

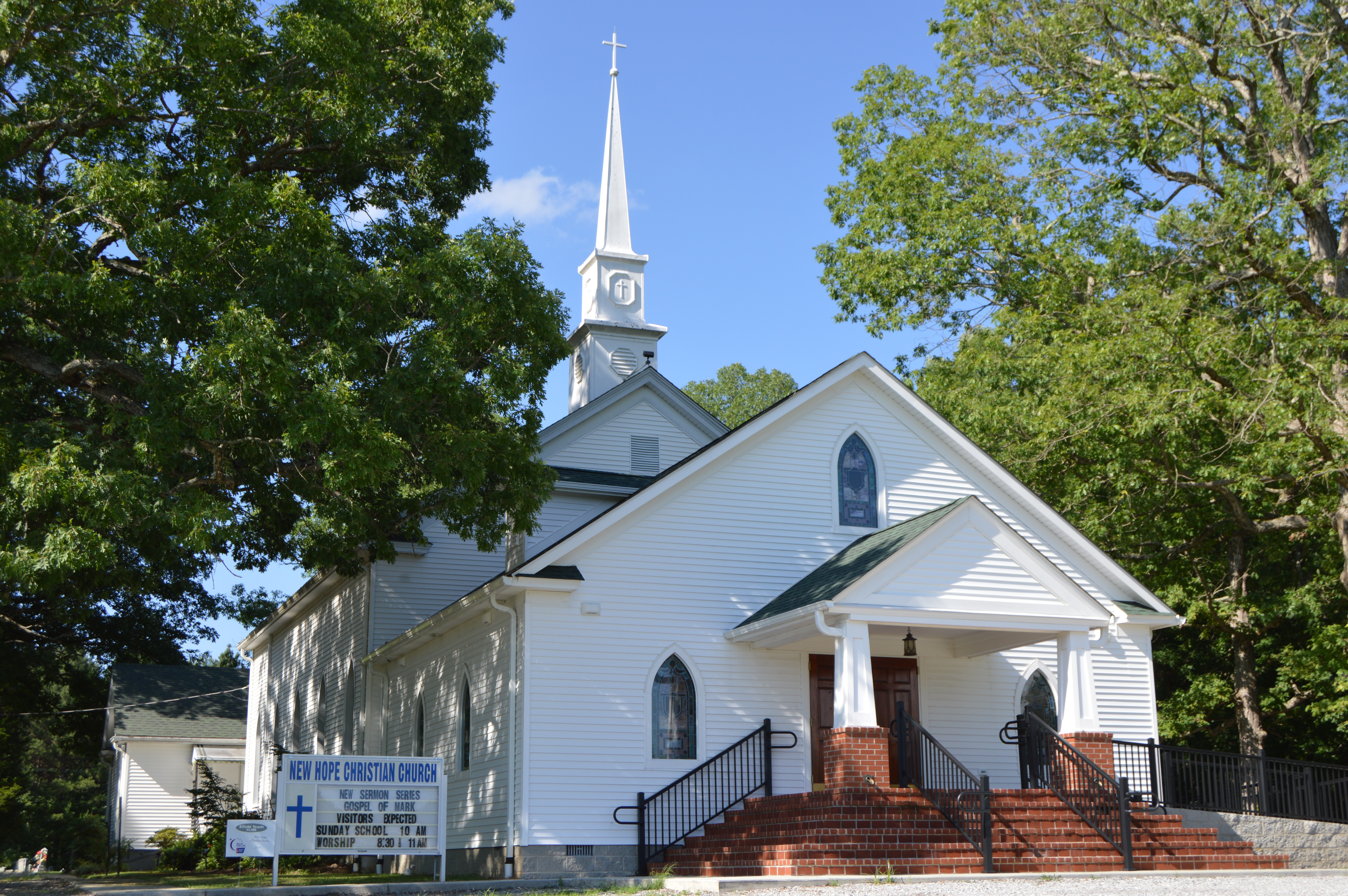
New Hope Christian Church

Danieltown is an unincorporated community in Brunswick County, in the U.S. state of Virginia.
