= Alberta, Virginia =

- Town
- Flag Seal

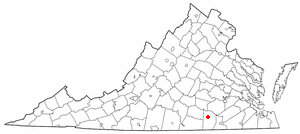
- Location of Alberta, Virginia
- Coordinates: 36°51′49″N 77°52′53″W
- Country: United States
- State: Virginia
- County: Brunswick

Area
  - Total: 2.15 sq mi (5.56 km^{2})
  - Land: 2.14 sq mi (5.53 km^{2})
  - Water: 0.012 sq mi (0.03 km^{2})
- Elevation: 397 ft (121 m)

Population (2020)
  - Total: 302
  - Density: 126.5/sq mi (48.85/km^{2})
- Time zone: UTC-5 (Eastern (EST))
  - Summer (DST): UTC-4 (EDT)
- ZIP code: 23821
- Area code: 434
- FIPS code: 51-00724
- GNIS feature ID: 1498398

Alberta is a town in Brunswick County, Virginia, United States. The population was 302 at the 2020 census.

== History ==
For much of the 20th century, Alberta marked the junction of two railroad mainlines. The Richmond, Petersburg and Carolina Railroad from Petersburg, Virginia to Ridgeway Junction (today Norlina, North Carolina) was completed in 1900, at which point it was merged into the Seaboard Air Line (SAL). By 1914, the population of Alberta was estimate by the railroad to be somewhere around 100. The Seaboard line (dubbed the "S-line" after later mergers) continued to operate into the 1980s, and today Alberta is along the abandoned portion of the CSX Norlina Subdivision. The Virginian Railway opened in 1907 from Norfolk to Victoria, Virginia, passing through Alberta (with through-service from the coalfields of Appalachia starting in 1909). The Virginian continued in use until it was gradually abandoned following a merger with Norfolk and Western in the later half of the 20th century.

Hobson's Choice and Rocky Run Methodist Church are listed on the National Register of Historic Places.

== Geography ==
Alberta is located in north-central Brunswick County along U.S. Route 1. Interstate 85 passes south of the original portion of the town. The town limits extend southwest along Route 1 and I-85 to Virginia State Route 46 and Southside Virginia Community College.

According to the United States Census Bureau, Alberta has a total area of 2.15 square miles (5.56 km^{2}), of which 2.14 square miles (5.53 km^{2}) is land and 0.01 square miles (0.03 km^{2}), or 0.61%, is water.

== Demographics ==
Historical population
| Census | Pop. | Note | %± |
|---|---|---|---|
| 1930 | 328 | | — |
| 1940 | 416 | | 26.8% |
| 1950 | 430 | | 3.4% |
| 1960 | 430 | | 0.0% |
| 1970 | 466 | | 8.4% |
| 1980 | 394 | | −15.5% |
| 1990 | 337 | | −14.5% |
| 2000 | 306 | | −9.2% |
| 2010 | 298 | | −2.6% |
| 2020 | 302 | | 1.3% |
U.S. Decennial Census

=== Racial and ethnic composition ===
Alberta town, Virginia – Racial and ethnic composition Note: the US Census treats Hispanic/Latino as an ethnic category. This table excludes Latinos from the racial categories and assigns them to a separate category. Hispanics/Latinos may be of any race.
| Race / Ethnicity (NH = Non-Hispanic) | Pop 2000 | Pop 2010 | Pop 2020 | % 2000 | % 2010 | % 2020 |
|---|---|---|---|---|---|---|
| White alone (NH) | 182 | 177 | 154 | 59.48% | 59.40% | 50.99% |
| Black or African American alone (NH) | 121 | 112 | 125 | 39.54% | 37.58% | 41.39% |
| Native American or Alaska Native alone (NH) | 0 | 4 | 0 | 0.00% | 1.34% | 0.00% |
| Asian alone (NH) | 1 | 0 | 4 | 0.33% | 0.00% | 1.32% |
| Native Hawaiian or Pacific Islander alone (NH) | 0 | 0 | 0 | 0.00% | 0.00% | 0.00% |
| Other race alone (NH) | 1 | 1 | 2 | 0.33% | 0.34% | 0.66% |
| Mixed race or Multiracial (NH) | 0 | 3 | 13 | 0.00% | 1.01% | 4.30% |
| Hispanic or Latino (any race) | 1 | 1 | 4 | 0.33% | 0.34% | 1.32% |
| Total | 306 | 298 | 302 | 100.00% | 100.00% | 100.00% |

=== 2000 census ===
At the 2000 census, there were 306 people, 128 households, and 86 families living in the town. The population density was 278.3 people per square mile (107.4/km^{2}). There were 158 housing units at an average density of 143.7 per square mile (55.5/km^{2}). The racial makeup of the town was 59.80% White, 39.54% African American, 0.33% Asian, 0.33% from other races. Hispanic or Latino of any race were 0.33%.

Of the 128 households, 26.6% had children under the age of 18 living with them, 44.5% were married couples living together, 20.3% had a female householder with no husband present, and 32.8% were non-families. 29.7% of households were one person and 14.1% were one person aged 65 or older. The average household size was 2.39 and the average family size was 2.93.

The age distribution was 26.8% under the age of 18, 5.2% from 18 to 24, 27.1% from 25 to 44, 24.2% from 45 to 64, and 16.7% 65 or older. The median age was 39 years. For every 100 females, there were 86.6 males. For every 100 females age 18 and over, there were 75.0 males.

The median household income was $27,361 and the median family income was $31,875. Males had a median income of $27,250 versus $20,833 for females. The per capita income for the town was $14,607. About 10.8% of families and 16.3% of the population were below the poverty line, including 21.1% of those under the age of eighteen and 14.5% of those sixty five or over.

== Notable person ==
- Bill Connelly, baseball player
