= Hobson's Choice (Alberta, Virginia) =

Historic house in Virginia, United States

- U.S. National Register of Historic Places
- Virginia Landmarks Register
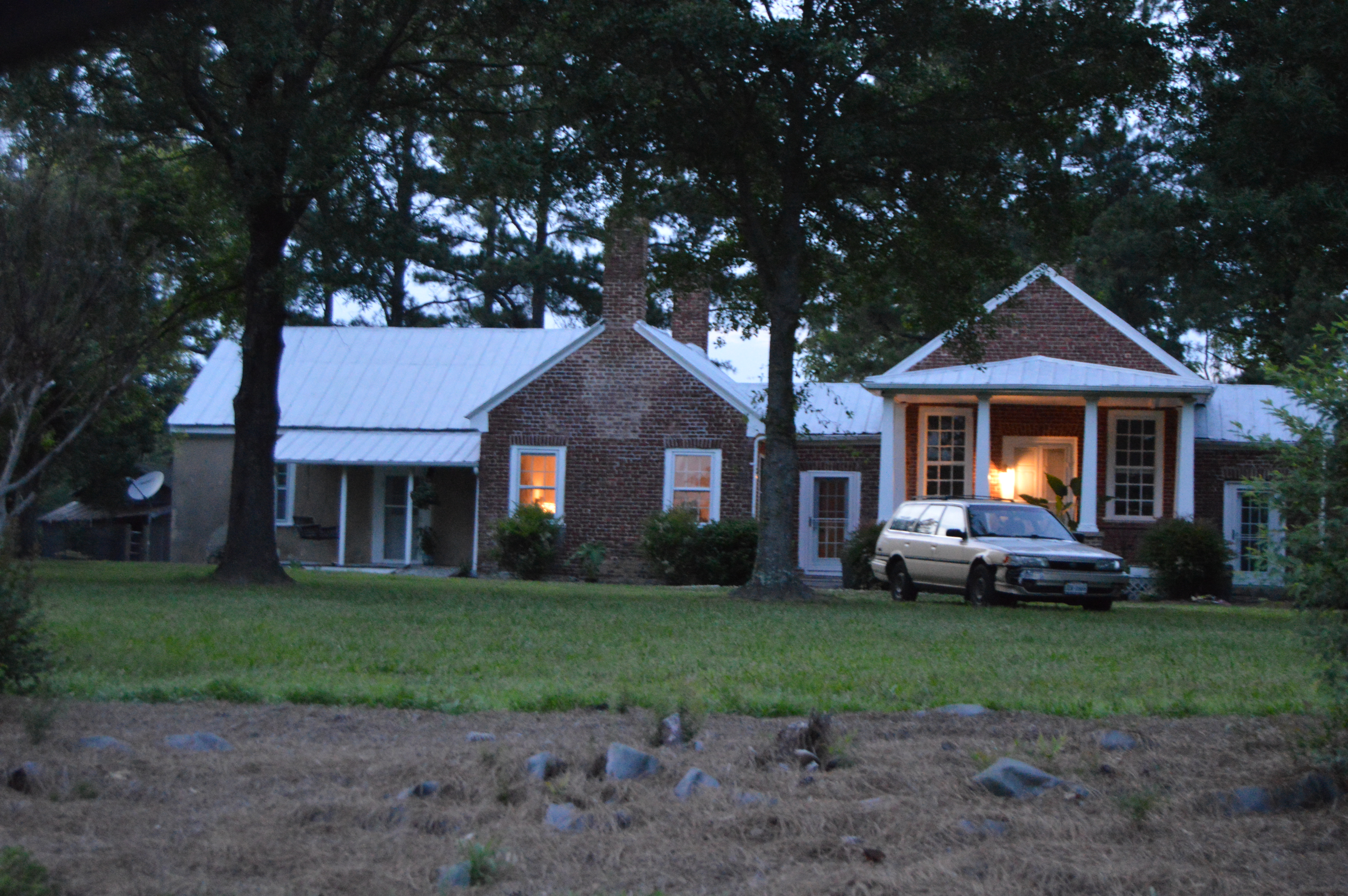
- Roadside view

- Location within Virginia Location within the United States
- Location: E of Alberta on VA 606, near Alberta, Virginia
- Coordinates: 36°52′19″N 77°49′0″W
- Area: 0 acres (0 ha)
- Built: c. 1794
- Architectural style: Georgian
- NRHP reference No.: 80004174
- VLR No.: 012-0013

Significant dates
- Added to NRHP: March 18, 1980
- Designated VLR: November 20, 1979

Hobson's Choice is an historic home located near Alberta, Brunswick County, Virginia. It was built in the Palladian style about 1794 by Dr. Richard Feild for his bride Ann Meade, on land the groom bought from his father-in-law. The Edinburgh educated physician also had considerable knowledge of botany and astronomy, edited The Intelligencer and Petersburg Commercial Advertiser, and three times served as a Presidential elector. Although Feild died in 1829, the plantation stayed in the family until 1870.

The one-story brick structure has a central pavilion with flanking wings connected by hyphens in a late-Georgian style. A stone addition was built about 1860, a brick room added in 1947, and a frame enclosed porch about 1953.

It was listed on the National Register of Historic Places in 1980.
