= National Register of Historic Places listings in Charlotte County, Virginia =

Location of Charlotte County in Virginia

This is a list of the National Register of Historic Places listings in Charlotte County, Virginia.

This is intended to be a complete list of the properties and districts on the National Register of Historic Places in Charlotte County, Virginia, United States. The locations of National Register properties and districts for which the latitude and longitude coordinates are included below, may be seen in an online map.

There are 20 properties and districts listed on the National Register in the county.

This National Park Service list is complete through NPS recent listings posted March 6, 2026.

== Current listings ==
	Name on the Register	Image	Date listed	Location	City or town	Description
1	Annefield	Annefield	November 12, 2009 (#09000920)	3200 Sunny Side Rd. 36°55′41″N 78°37′21″W	Saxe	
2	Charlotte County Courthouse	Charlotte County Courthouse	May 7, 1980 (#80004178)	State Routes 40 and 47; 37°03′22″N 78°38′15″W	Charlotte Court House	
3	Charlotte Court House Historic District	Charlotte Court House Historic District	February 8, 1995 (#95000023)	State Route 40 between Evergreen Rd. and State Route 47; 37°03′23″N 78°38′17″W	Charlotte Court House	
4	Clarkton Bridge	Clarkton Bridge	January 26, 2007 (#06000747)	Clarkton Bridge Rd. over the Staunton River; 36°58′42″N 78°53′48″W	Nathalie	Extends into Halifax County
5	Four Locust Farm	Four Locust Farm	December 3, 2009 (#09001053)	U.S. Route 15; 37°03′48″N 78°28′30″W	Keysville	
6	Gravel Hill	Gravel Hill	February 16, 2001 (#01000150)	3990 Fearstown Rd. 37°02′14″N 78°44′41″W	Charlotte Court House	
7	Greenfield	Greenfield	April 2, 1973 (#73002000)	East of Charlotte Court House on Greenfield Rd. 37°04′01″N 78°35′02″W	Charlotte Court House	
8	Keysville Historic District		April 28, 2023 (#100008902)	King and Church Sts., Railroad Ave., and others 37°02′24″N 78°28′58″W	Keysville	
9	Keysville Railroad Station	Keysville Railroad Station	November 12, 2008 (#08001050)	Railroad Ave. 37°02′23″N 78°29′06″W	Keysville	
10	Maple Roads	Maple Roads	September 14, 2002 (#02000999)	1325 Richardson Rd. 37°03′44″N 78°31′21″W	Keysville	
11	Mulberry Hill	Mulberry Hill	March 20, 1973 (#73002001)	North of Randolph on Roanoke Creek Rd. 36°54′31″N 78°41′56″W	Randolph	
12	Red Hill	Red Hill	February 14, 1978 (#78003012)	Southeast of Brookneal on Red Hill Rd. 37°01′56″N 78°53′53″W	Brookneal	
13	Roanoke Plantation	Roanoke Plantation	April 11, 1973 (#73002002)	West of Saxe off Scuffletown Rd. 36°55′17″N 78°42′35″W	Saxe	
14	Salem School	Salem School	October 30, 1998 (#98001309)	Junction of Tobacco Hill and Cargills Creek Rds. 36°46′10″N 78°38′13″W	Red Oak	
15	Staunton Hill	Staunton Hill	October 1, 1969 (#69000229)	Southwest of the junction of Terrell and Staunton Creek Rds. 36°59′35″N 78°51′09″W	Brookneal	
16	Toombs Tobacco Farm	Toombs Tobacco Farm	January 28, 2000 (#00000027)	1125 Tates Mill Rd. 36°47′17″N 78°35′36″W	Red Oak	
17	Wade Archeological Site (44CH0062)	Wade Archeological Site (44CH0062)	October 23, 2003 (#03001194)	1035 Fort Hill Trail; 36°53′13″N 78°42′17″W	Randolph	
18	Watkins House	Watkins House	May 27, 2004 (#04000549)	3115 Briery Rd. 37°04′19″N 78°30′25″W	Keysville	
19	Westview	Westview	February 4, 2000 (#00000067)	1672 Terrell Rd. 37°01′43″N 78°51′50″W	Brookneal	
20	Woodfork	Woodfork	January 24, 2002 (#01001509)	3704 Woodfork Rd. 37°06′04″N 78°40′00″W	Charlotte Court House	

== See also ==
- List of National Historic Landmarks in Virginia
- National Register of Historic Places listings in Virginia
