= Paul Carrington (judge) =

American judge

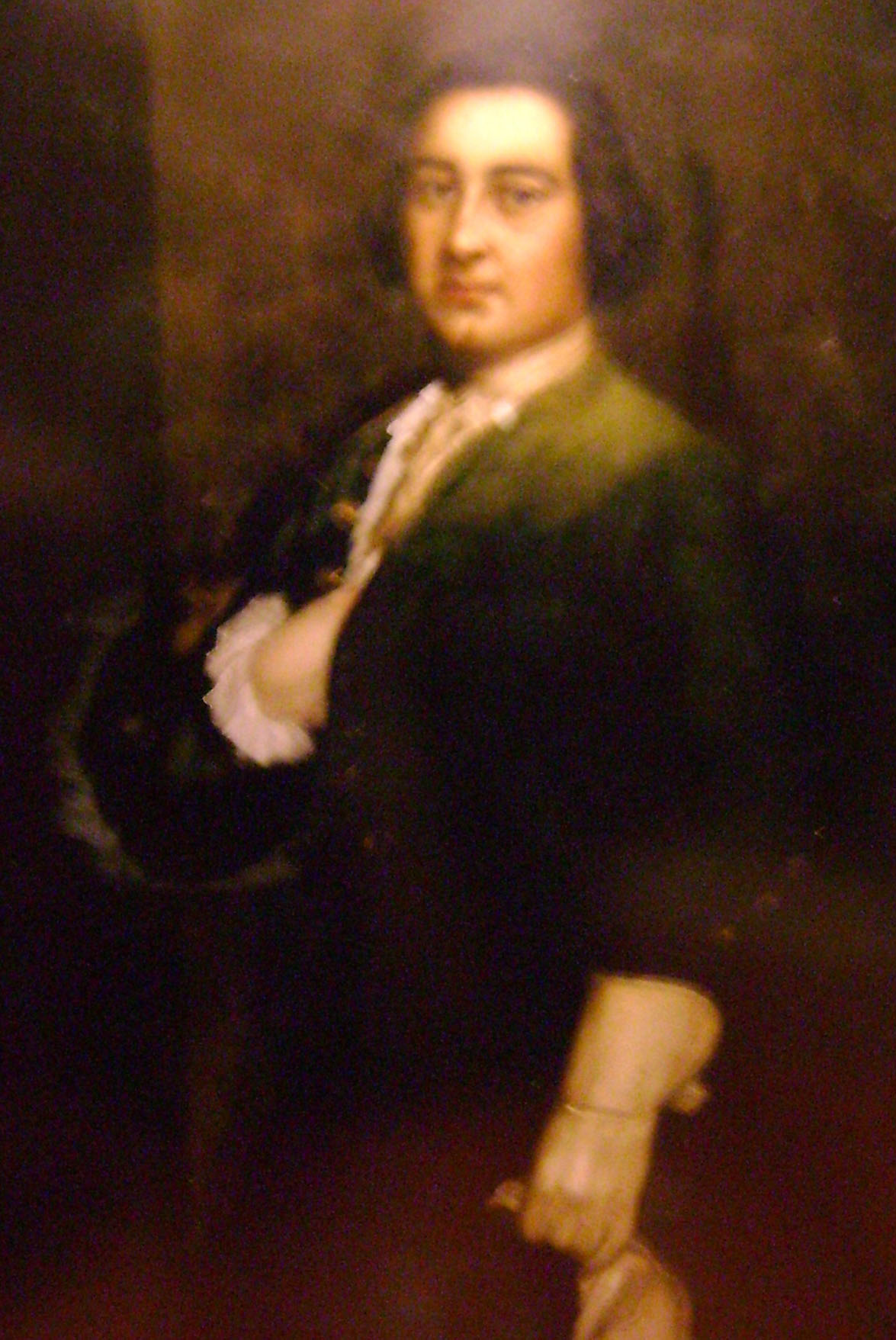

Justice of the Virginia Supreme Court
- In office December 24, 1788 – July 30, 1807

Member of the Virginia Senate from Charlotte, Halifax and Prince Edward Counties
- In office 1776–1778
- Preceded by: position created
- Succeeded by: Walter Coles

Member of the Virginia House of Burgesses from Charlotte County
- In office 1765–1776 Serving with Clement Reade, Isaac Read, James Speed
- Preceded by: position created
- Succeeded by: position abolished

Personal details
- Born: March 16, 1733 Charlotte County, Colony of Virginia
- Died: June 23, 1818 (aged 85) Halifax County, Virginia
- Spouse(s): Margaret Read, Priscilla Sims
- Occupation: Lawyer, judge, politician

Paul Carrington (March 16, 1733 – June 23, 1818) was a Virginia planter, lawyer, judge and politician. He served in the Virginia House of Burgesses representing Charlotte County, and later in the Virginia Senate where his district also included neighboring Halifax and Prince Edward Counties. In 1788, legislators elected him as a justice of the Virginia Court of Appeals, now the Supreme Court of Virginia. He was a delegate to the Virginia Ratifying Convention in 1788 and cast his vote for ratification of the United States Constitution.

== Early life and education ==
Carrington was born on March 16, 1733, at "Boston Hill" in the former Goochland County of the Colony of Virginia. His parents were Anne Mayo (1712–1785) and Col. George Carrington (1711–1785), a surveyor and planter in southside Virginia, who held local offices and became one of the burgesses long representing Goochland County.

His paternal grandparents, Dr. Paul Carrington and Henningham Codrington, had migrated from England to the Island of Barbados, and his parents arrived in Virginia in 1723. Paul Carrington's maternal grandparents were Major William Mayo and Frances Gould. The family also included a much-younger brother, Edward Carrington who distinguished himself as a Continental Army officer and served in the Confederation Congress.

After receiving a private education, at about age 17 Carrington began reading law under the direction of Colonel Clement Read in Lunenburg County. Read was the county clerk and served as a burgess.

== Career ==
In May 1755, Carrington received a license to practice law, signed by Peyton Randolph, John Randolph and George Wythe. On October 1, he married Read's daughter, Margaret and the couple lived at Mulberry Hill, a plantation on the Staunton River in the part of Lunenberg County that became Charlotte County.

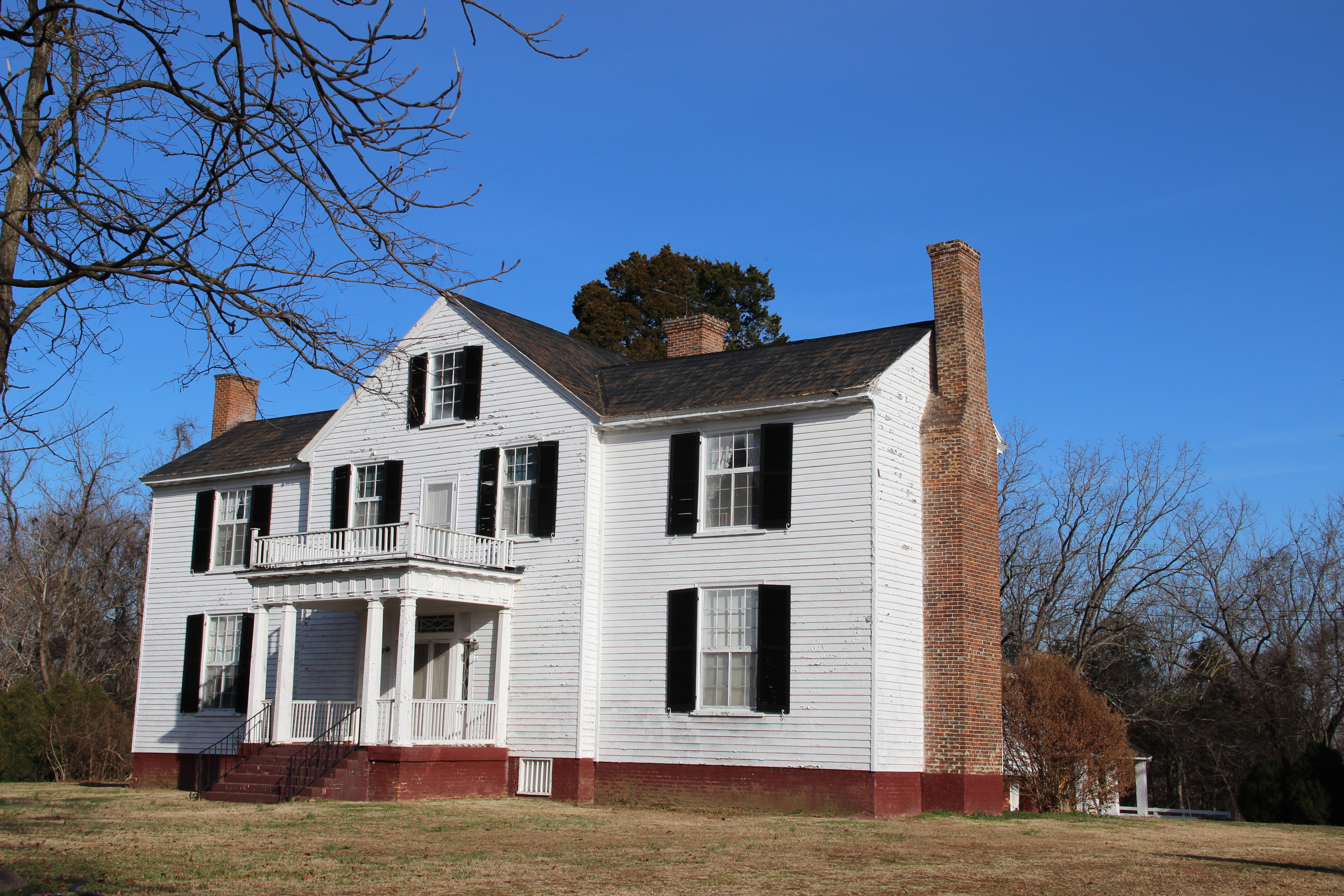
"Mulberry Hill", Carrington's home and resting place

In 1756, Carrington accepted an appointment as king's attorney (prosecutor) for Bedford County northwest of his home. As he gained legal and political experience, and colonial settlement moved westward, Carrington accepted additional appointments as king's attorney—for Mecklenburg County in 1767, Botetourt County in 1770, and Lunenburg County in 1770.

Carrington became an officer of the Lunenburg County militia, with the rank of major in 1761. In 1764, he became colonel of the Charlotte County militia. He also served for years as vestryman and churchwarden of Cornwall Parish.

Carrington served as county lieutenant and presiding justice of Charlotte county in 1772 and clerk of Halifax County that year. He was chairman of the Charlotte County Committee of Safety from 1774 to 1776, which endorsed the resolutions of the Continental Congress. In 1775, he became a member of the first board of trustees in the founding of Hampden-Sydney College.

Carrington was elected to the House of Burgesses for Charlotte County in 1765; he was regularly re-elected, serving until Governor Dunmore suspended the legislature in 1775. Charlotte County voters then elected Carrington to five Virginia Revolutionary conventions. The Third Revolutionary Convention appointed Carrington to the statewide Committee of Safety. In the Fifth Revolutionary Convention, he served on the committee that drafted the Virginia Declaration of Rights and the first Virginia Constitution.

Later in 1776, voters from Charlotte and neighboring Halifax and Prince Edward counties elected Carrington to represent them in the newly created Virginia Senate. At the time his father represented Cumberland County in the Virginia House of Delegates. His parents died in 1785, separated by only eight days. His father had not made a will, so Carrington as the firstborn son inherited the entire estate, which included 32,000 acres of land and 18 slaves; he nevertheless chose to divide the estate equitably according to his father's plan. In the Virginia tax census of 1787, he owned 30 slaves in Charlotte county older than 16 years old, 17 younger slaves, 19 horses and 100 livestock as well as a two-wheeled riding chair. His son Paul Carrington Jr. owned 12 slaves over 16, 12 younger slaves, 8 horses and 34 cattle, while George Carrington Jr. owned 8 adult slaves and 4 young slaves as well as 10 horses and 47 cattle in Halifax County.

Legislators elected Carrington as a Judge of the first Virginia General Court under the newly adopted Virginia state constitution on January 23, 1778. He was the second Justice appointed to the new Court of Appeals, which was then composed of judges from the General, the Admiralty and the Chancery Courts. In 1780 he became the Chief Justice of the Virginia General Court. In 1789, the Virginia General Assembly elected Carrington as a Justice of the reorganized Virginia Supreme Court of Appeals.

In 1788, Carrington was a delegate to the Virginia Ratifying Convention held at the Richmond Theatre, which narrowly ratified the United States Constitution, by a vote of 89 – 79. He chaired the important Committee on Privileges and Elections (as he had in the legislature), and ultimately voted in favor of ratification. Carrington nonetheless had some misgivings, since he had also played a vigorous role in the development of the Virginia Declaration of Rights, which became a model for the U.S. Bill of Rights. His son, sometimes referred to as George Carrington Jr. to distinguish him from his grandfather, who had served in the patriot armies under his uncle Col. Edward Carrington, also was a delegate at the convention, but had opposed ratification without the amendments.

At age 75, concerned as to his ability to continue judicial duties, Carrington resigned from the bench in 1807. On August 1 of that year he wrote, "I have served the public a great many years, and I know with faithful integrity, I had arrived to a time of life that every man ought, in my opinion, to retire, and not remain and die at his post as some of my brethren have." He lived another eleven years, including serving as a presidential elector in 1808.

Carrington farmed with enslaved labor his entire life, as did his sons. Complicating matters, one of his sons, who served as speaker of the Virginia Senate before also becoming a judge, was named Paul. In the last federal census of his lifetime, Carrington’s name appears on two entries on the same page for different plantations. One entry shows him with several other freeborn whites as well as 78 enslaved blacks. The other entry included only a white male older than 45 with 95 slaves.

== Personal life ==
Carrington’s children included George Carrington Jr. (1756–1809), Mary Scott Carrington Venable (1758–1837), Ann Carrington Cabell (1760–1838), Clement Carrington (1762–1847) and Paul Carrington Jr. (1764–1816). His first wife died on May 1, 1766; Carrington referred to her as "the best of wives and a woman of innumerable virtues". On March 6, 1792, Carrington married his second wife, Priscilla Sims, aged 16. Their children were: Henry Carrington (1793–1867), Lettice Priscilla Carrington Coles (1798–1875, who married Walter Coles, and Robert Carrington (1802–1845). She died in September 1803, and Carrington said that her loss was irreparable to him and to their family.

== Death and legacy ==
Judge Carrington lived in retirement another 11 years until he died at the age of 85. He is buried between his wives on the grounds at Mulberry Hill near Randolph, Virginia. His home was listed on the National Register of Historic Places in 1973, and in 1999 it became part of Staunton River Battlefield State Park. His papers, with those of his sons Clement and Robert Carrington, are held by the Library of Virginia.
