= Keysville Mission Industrial Academy =

School in Keysville, Virginia, US (1898–1957)

Location
- 595 Bluestone Road, Keysville, Charlotte County, Virginia; United States; 37.040825°N 78.497374°W

Information
- Former names: Bluestone Harmony Academic and Industrial School, Bluestone–Harmony Academy, Bluestone African American School
- School type: Black Private
- Religious affiliation: Baptist
- Founded: 1898
- Founders: Bluestone Harmony Baptist Association
- Closed: 1957

The Keysville Mission Industrial Academy (1898–1957), also known as the Bluestone Harmony Academic and Industrial School, was a private Baptist boarding and day school for African American students in Keysville, Charlotte County, Virginia, U.S.. It was a significant institution within the context of African American education during the Jim Crow era, and many of the students continued on to historically Black colleges.

== History ==
The Keysville Mission Industrial Academy was founded in 1898, by the Bluestone Harmony Baptist Association. Jesse H. Wilson, of Wilson & Co. General Store, was instrumental in the early founding years of the school. It existed during a time of racial segregation, and was one of twelve black schools opened in the state of Virginia by the Baptist Church, others included Spiller Academy (1891), Ruffin Academy (1894), Northern Neck Industrial Academy (1898), Halifax Industrial Institute (1901), Rappahannock Industrial Academy (1902), Pittsylvania Industrial, Normal, and Collegiate Institute (1903), Bowling Green Industrial Academy (1903), King William Academy (1903), Fredericksburg Normal and Industrial Institute (1905), Nansemond Collegiate Institute (1905), and Corey Memorial Institute (1906).

The school employed five teachers and had over 200 students. Principals included Rev. Marcellus Carlye Rux (1882–1948). Teachers included Rev. William P. Hayes Jr. (1881–?).

In 1930, the Central High School in Charlotte Court House, Virginia was the first public school for African American students in the area. The Keysville Mission Industrial Academy closed in 1957, after the Supreme Court ordered desegregation of the Charlotte County school system in 1954.

== See also ==
- Salem School (1923–1959) in Red Oak, Virginia, a former Rosenwald school
- Randolph-Henry High School (1938–present)
