= Salem School =

Salem School may refer to:

in Baden-Württemberg in Germany

- Schule Schloss Salem, an elite boarding school founded in 1920 by Kurt Hahn

in Ghana in West Africa

- Salem School, Osu, boy's boarding middle school in the suburb of Osu, Accra in Ghana

in the United States (by state)

- Salem School (Naugatuck, Connecticut), listed on the National Register of Historic Places in New Haven County, Connecticut
- Old Salem School, Macon, Mississippi, listed on the National Register of Historic Places in Noxubee County, Mississippi
- Salem School (Red Oak, Virginia), listed on the National Register of Historic Places in Charlotte County, Virginia

== See also ==
- Salem Academy (disambiguation)
- Salem High School (disambiguation)
