= Gravel Hill =

Gravel Hill or Gravel Hill Plantation may refer to:

in Canada

- Gravel Hill, New Brunswick, Canada

in the United Kingdom

- Gravel Hill tram stop, London light rail stop
- Gravel Hill, Kington, the parental home of composer E.J. Moeran

in the United States

- Gravel Hill, Delaware, an unincorporated community
- Gravel Hill, Missouri, an unincorporated community
- Gravel Hill, New Jersey, an unincorporated community
- Gravel Hill Plantation (Allendale, South Carolina)
- Gravel Hill Plantation (Hampton, South Carolina)
- Gravel Hill, Buckingham County, Virginia
- Gravel Hill (Charlotte Court House, Virginia) (a plantation house)
