= Annefield =

Annefield may refer to:

- Annefield (Saxe, Virginia)
- Annefield (Boyce, Virginia)
- Annfield Plain, England
- Annfield Stadium, England
