= Joseph R. Holmes =

- Born: ca. 1838; Charlotte County
- Died: May 3, 1869 (aged 30–31); Charlotte County courthouse
- Cause of death: Pistol shot
- Occupations: Shoemaker, politician
- Political party: Republican
- Spouse: Mary Clark
- Children: Payton (1865), Louisa (1866), Joseph (1867) and William H. Holmes
- Parent(s): Payton and Nancy Holmes

Joseph R. Holmes (c. 1838-May 3, 1869) was a former slave who worked as a shoemaker, and after being emancipated during the American Civil War became a farmer and politician in Charlotte County, Virginia. Elected to the Virginia Constitutional Convention of 1868, he was murdered outside the Charlotte County Courthouse for his political activities.

== Background ==
A former slave, Holmes aligned with the Radical Republicans and published various articles critical of conservatives after the Civil War. He married Mary Clarke. They had three sons and one daughter.

On October 23, 1867, Holmes and Edward Nelson (also African American) were elected to represent Charlotte and Halifax Counties in the Virginia Constitutional Convention of 1868. Holmes defeated former Confederate and Virginia Supreme Court justice Wood Bouldin, and was one of the African American delegates most ridiculed in the conservative press. The convention finished its work and approved a constitution on April 17, 1868. The provisions disenfranchising former Confederates were controversial and the constitution needed voter approval at a forthcoming election (which did not happen until July 1869). In March 1869, Holmes attended a convention of Republicans in Petersburg, Virginia representing his locality.

On May 29, 1868, Holmes bought 11.5 acres of land in Charlotte County near Keysville. He was also literate and wrote letters to the local Freedmen's Bureau agent, advocating establishment of a school in Keysville, Virginia.

== Murder ==
John Marshall, son of Judge Hunter Holmes Marshall (a former Virginia delegate, owner of Roxobel plantation and cousin of another John Marshall, one of whom was Holmes' former owner) reportedly threatened to kill Holmes and African Americans active in the Republican Party, and shot a black man (who survived) on the morning of May 3, 1869. That afternoon, Holmes went to the Charlotte County Courthouse and Marshall thought he was going to seek a warrant against him. A confrontation occurred on the courthouse steps in broad daylight before a large crowd, and Holmes (who was unarmed) was shot dead. Brothers John Marshall and Griffin S. Marshall, William Boyd and Macon C. Morris were charged with his murder but the grand jury refused to indict Griffin Marshall, and all four fled and were never brought to trial. The incident was widely reported across the US and overseas.

== Legacy ==
Holmes is presumed buried on the land he had bought, although only the receipt for his burial survives. Long-lost witness accounts of the incident were discovered at the Charlotte Courthouse in 2012.
