= Toombs Tobacco Farm =

Historic house in Virginia, United States

- U.S. National Register of Historic Places
- Virginia Landmarks Register
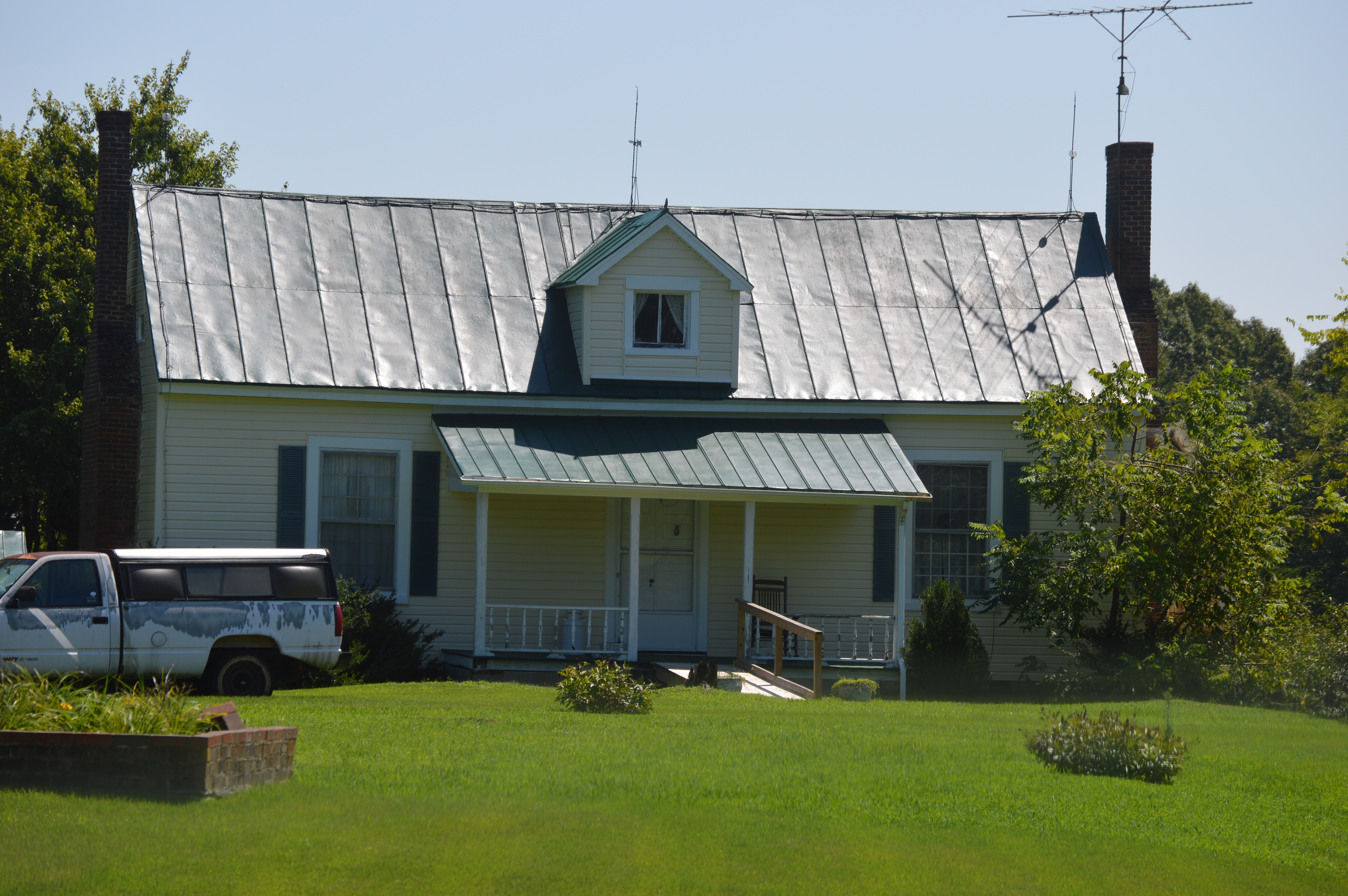
- Front of the house

- Location within Virginia Location within the United States
- Location: 1125 Tates Mill Rd., Red Oak, Virginia
- Coordinates: 36°47′04″N 78°35′36″W
- Area: 128 acres (52 ha)
- Built: c. 1830
- Architectural style: Federal
- NRHP reference No.: 00000027
- VLR No.: 019-5146

Significant dates
- Added to NRHP: January 28, 2000
- Designated VLR: September 15, 1999

Toombs Tobacco Farm is a historic home and farm complex located near Red Oak, Charlotte County, Virginia, USA. Contributing resources include the main residence, summer kitchen, family cemetery, tobacco barns, smoke house, animal pens and other ancillary structures. The main house is a 1 1/2-story wood frame dwelling with a standing seam metal roof in a vernacular Federal style. A two-story rear addition was built about 1910. The Toombs family owned the property from the 1830s until 1981.

It was listed on the National Register of Historic Places in 2000.
