= Wren, Virginia =

Unincorporated community in Virginia, United States

Coordinates: 37°07′08″N 78°50′59″W

Wren (formerly, Midway) is an unincorporated community in Charlotte County, Virginia, United States. It lies at an elevation of 604 feet (184 m).
