= Salem High School =

Salem High School may refer to a school in the United States:

- North Salem High School (Salem, Oregon), formerly known as Salem High School
- Salem High School (Arkansas)
- Salem High School (Conyers, Georgia)
- Salem High School (Indiana)
- Salem High School (Massachusetts)
- Salem High School, in the Plymouth-Canton Educational Park, Canton, Michigan
- Salem High School (New Hampshire)
- Salem High School (New Jersey)
- Salem High School (Ohio)
- Salem High School (Salem, Virginia)
- Salem High School (Virginia Beach, Virginia)

== See also ==
- Salem Academy (disambiguation)
- Salem School (disambiguation)
