= Four Locust Farm =

- U.S. National Register of Historic Places
- Virginia Landmarks Register
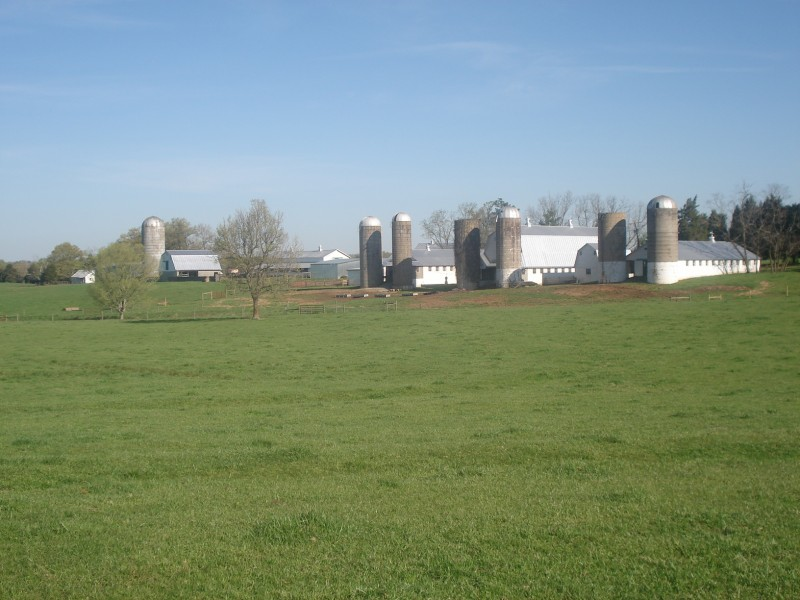

- Location within Virginia Location within the United States
- Location: U.S. Route 15, near Keysville, Virginia
- Coordinates: 37°3′30″N 78°28′47″W
- Area: 332.9 acres (134.7 ha)
- Built: c. 1859
- NRHP reference No.: 09001053
- VLR No.: 019-5206

Significant dates
- Added to NRHP: December 3, 2009
- Designated VLR: September 17, 2009

Four Locust Farm, also known as Pettus Dairy Farm, is a historic home and farm complex located near Keysville, Charlotte County, Virginia. The property includes a vernacular farm house dwelling, built around 1859, and a row of 20th-century farm buildings. The house is a two-story, three-bay-wide, frame dwelling that is covered by a low-pitched, hipped roof of standing-seam metal, and clad with weatherboards.

Farm buildings include frame and masonry dairy/hay barns, silos, a milk house, workshop, equipment sheds, cattle pens, and tenant houses. The farm produced tobacco from 1919 until 1925; beginning in 1925, the farm turned to dairy production with a 100-head Holstein-Friesian herd.

In 1962, the farm ended its dairy operations and turned to beef cattle production. The farm is now owned and operated by Pettus's grandson, Zach Tucker.

It was listed on the National Register of Historic Places in 2009.
