= Saxe, Virginia =

Unincorporated community in Virginia, United States

- Unincorporated community
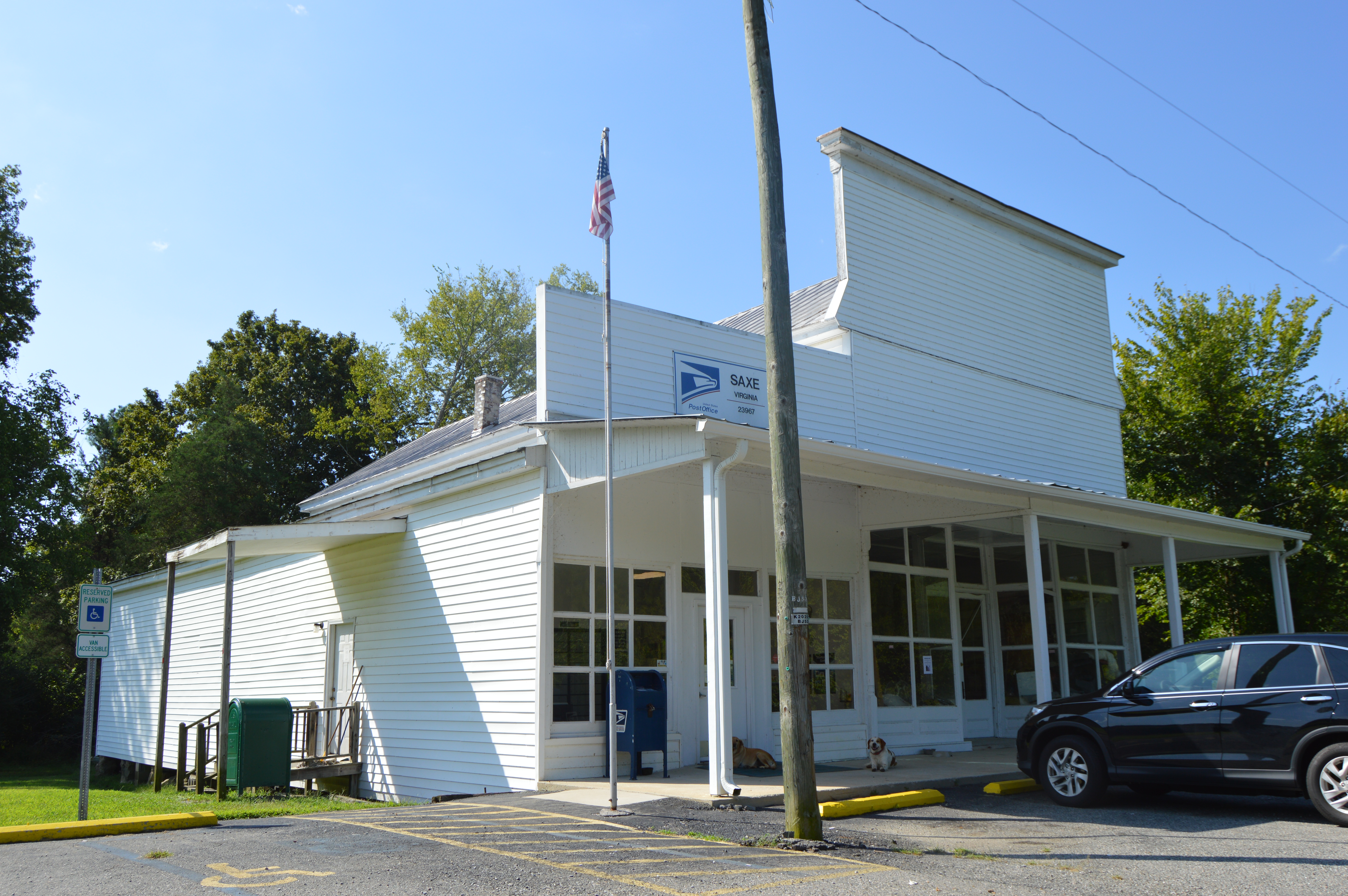
- Post office

- Location within Virginia Location within the United States
- Coordinates: 36°55′48″N 78°39′48″W
- Country: United States
- State: Virginia
- County: Charlotte
- Elevation: 338 ft (103 m)
- Time zone: UTC-5 (Eastern (EST))
  - Summer (DST): UTC-4 (EDT)
- ZIP code: 23967
- Area code: 434
- GNIS feature ID: 1477721

Saxe is an unincorporated community in Charlotte County, Virginia, United States. Saxe is 5.6 miles (9.0 km) southwest of Drakes Branch. Saxe has a post office with ZIP code 23967, which opened on May 2, 1889. Annefield and Roanoke Plantation, both of which are listed on the National Register of Historic Places, are located near Saxe.
