= Red House, Virginia =

Unincorporated community in Virginia, United States

- Unincorporated community
- Location within the Commonwealth of Virginia Red House (the United States)
- Coordinates: 37°11′21″N 78°48′44″W
- Country: United States
- State: Virginia
- County: Charlotte
- Elevation: 755 ft (230 m)
- Time zone: UTC−5 (Eastern (EST))
  - Summer (DST): UTC−4 (EDT)
- ZIP codes: 23963
- GNIS ID: 1473054

Red House is a small unincorporated community in Charlotte County, Virginia, United States.
