= Mulberry Hill (Randolph, Virginia) =

Historic house in Virginia, United States

- U.S. National Register of Historic Places
- Virginia Landmarks Register
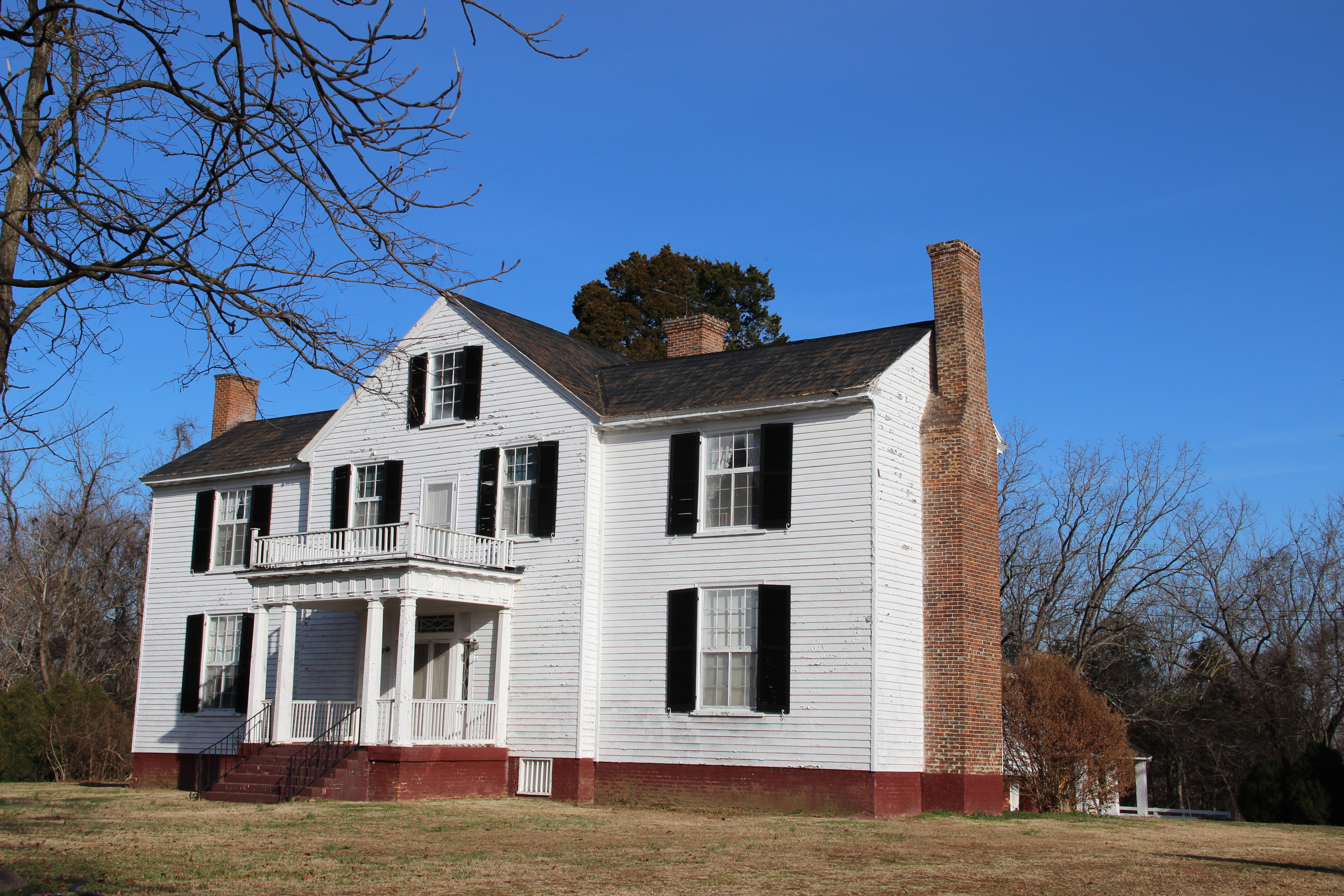

- Location within Virginia Location within the United States
- Location: E of Charlotte Court House on VA 656, near Randolph, Virginia
- Coordinates: 36°54′29″N 78°41′49″W
- Area: 40 acres (16 ha)
- NRHP reference No.: 73002001
- VLR No.: 019-0024

Significant dates
- Added to NRHP: March 20, 1973
- Designated VLR: October 17, 1972

Mulberry Hill is a historic plantation house located near Randolph, Charlotte County, Virginia. The original section dates to the 18th century and forms the slightly projecting, gable-end, two-story front center pavilion. Flanking this center section are single-bay two-story wings added in the mid-19th century. At the same time, a two-story rear wing was added. The front facade features a mid-19th century porch with a full Doric order entablature supported on octagonal Doric columns. Also on the property are the contributing Judge Paul Carrington's office building, a brick kitchen, a frame spinning house, a dairy, a smokehouse, a privy, and enslaved dwellings. It was the home plantation of 18th century political official and jurist Paul Carrington (1733–1818). He is buried on the plantation grounds.

It was listed on the National Register of Historic Places in 1973. In 1999 the Butler family donated the plantation to the state as an expansion of Staunton River Battlefield State Park.
