= Woodfork =

Historic house in Virginia, United States

- U.S. National Register of Historic Places
- Virginia Landmarks Register
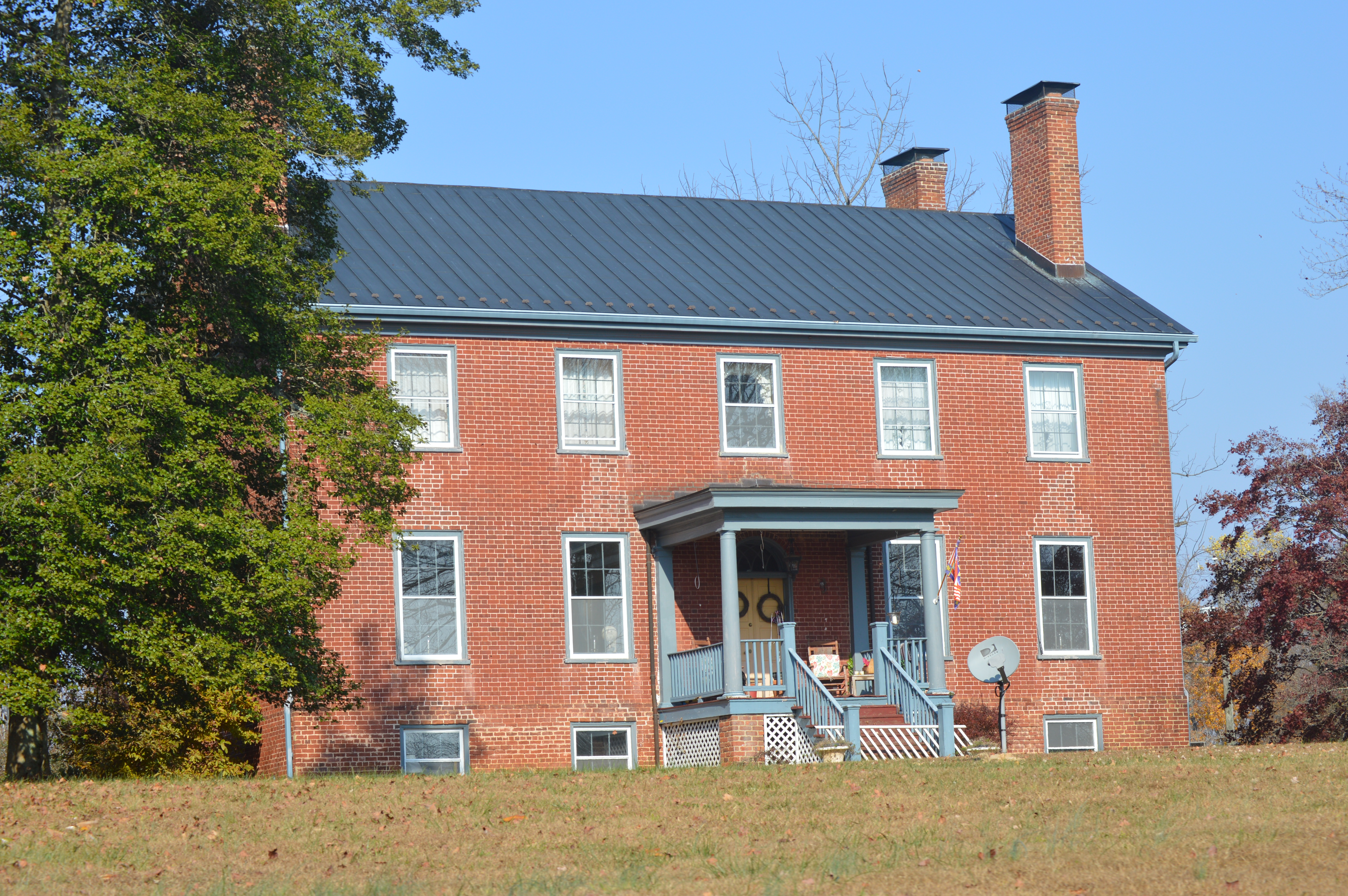
- Front of the house

- Location within Virginia Location within the United States
- Location: 3704 Woodfork Rd., Charlotte Court House, Virginia
- Coordinates: 37°6′4″N 78°40′0″W
- Area: 35 acres (14 ha)
- Built: 1829
- Built by: Watkins, Henry Anderson
- Architectural style: Federal
- NRHP reference No.: 01001509
- VLR No.: 019-0034

Significant dates
- Added to NRHP: January 24, 2002
- Designated VLR: June 13, 2001

Woodfork is a historic plantation house located near Charlotte Court House, Charlotte County, Virginia. It was built in 1829, and is a three-story, five bay brick dwelling with a gable roof in the Federal style. The front and rear facades feature one bay porches with hipped roofs supported by Tuscan order columns. Also on the property is a contributing a barn and four historic sites: two graveyards, the remains of a brick kiln, and the remains of a barn.

It was listed on the National Register of Historic Places in 2002.
