= Salem Academy (disambiguation) =

Salem Academy may refer to any of several schools:

- Salem Academy in Winston-Salem, North Carolina
- Salem Academy Christian Schools in Salem, Oregon
- South Salem Academy in South Salem, Ohio
- Winston-Salem Preparatory Academy in Winston-Salem, North Carolina

== See also ==
- Salem High School (disambiguation)
- Salem School (disambiguation)
