= Staunton River Battlefield State Park =

State park in Virginia, USA

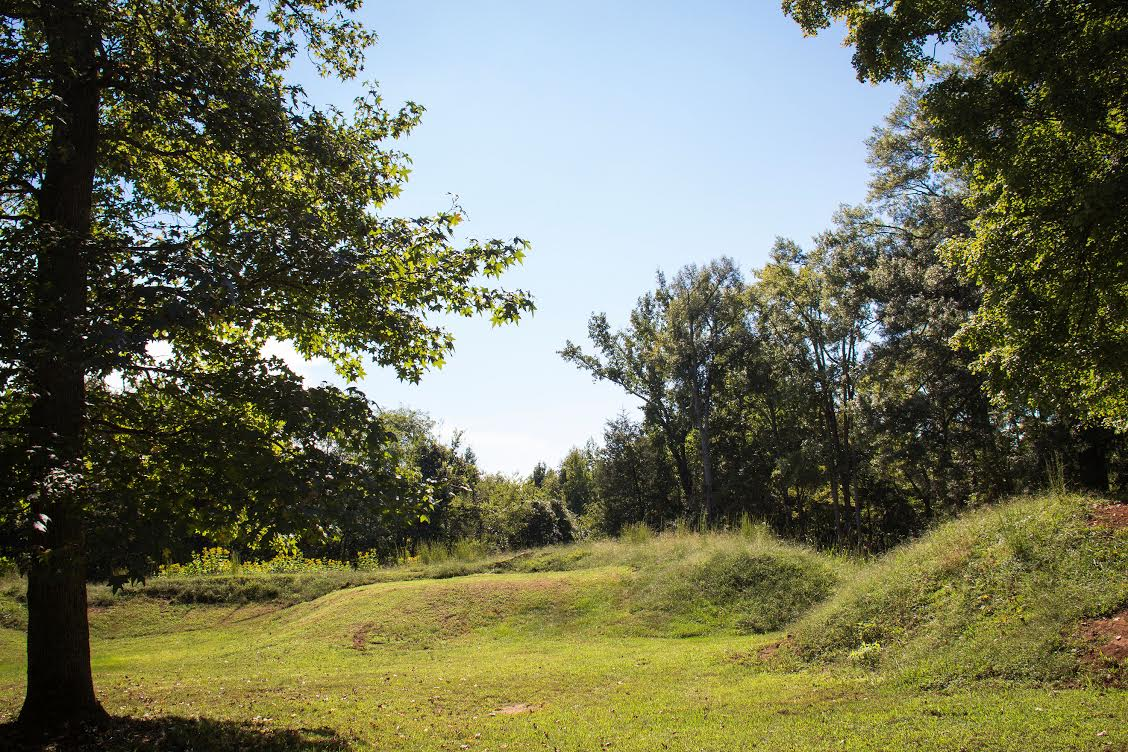
- Staunton River Battlefield State Park, April 2018

- Location within Virginia Location within the United States
- Location: 1035 Fort Hill Trail, Randolph, VA 23962
- Nearest city: Powhatan, Virginia
- Coordinates: 36°53′10″N 78°42′12″W
- Area: 300 acres (1 km^{2})
- Governing body: Virginia Department of Conservation and Recreation

Staunton River Battlefield State Park is a state park located in Virginia. The park straddles the Staunton River in Halifax and Charlotte counties. The Roanoke visitor center in Randolph, Virginia is a railroad depot which now holds exhibits on Native Americans and railroad history. The Clover visitor center has exhibits on the American Civil War and the battle which took place on this site. It also includes information about the production of electric energy. The park also includes the Mulberry Hill plantation, given to the state in 1999.

Located in the park is the Wade Archeological Site. It was listed on the National Register of Historic Places in 2003. The Confederate fortifications at the bridge were listed in 2014.

== See also ==
- National Register of Historic Places listings in Halifax County, Virginia
- List of Virginia state parks
- List of Virginia state forests
