= Charlotte Court House Historic District =

Historic district in Virginia, United States

- U.S. National Register of Historic Places
- U.S. Historic district
- Virginia Landmarks Register
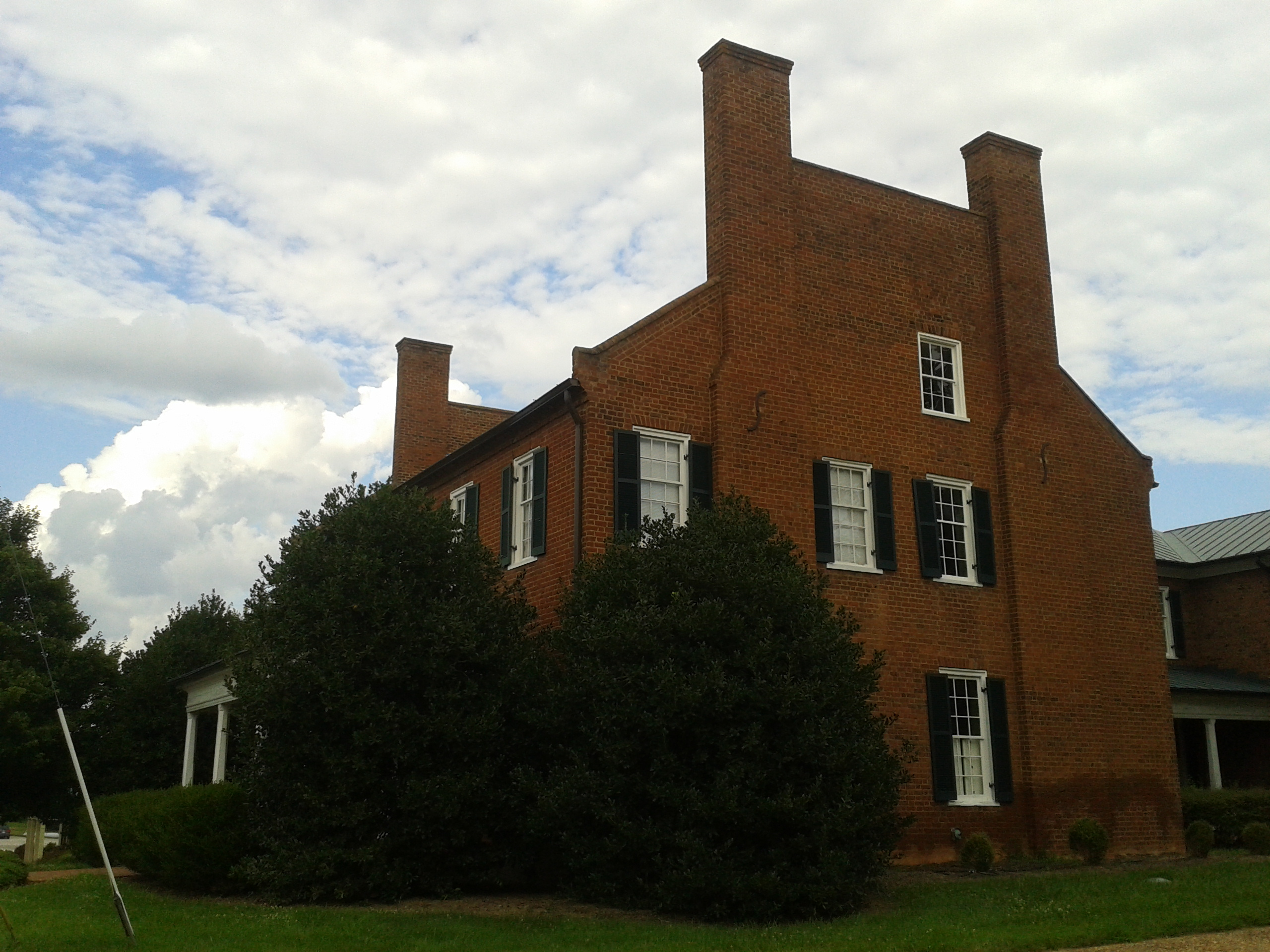

- Location within Virginia Location within the United States
- Location: VA 40 between VA 645 and VA 47, Charlotte Court House, Virginia
- Coordinates: 37°3′26″N 78°38′39″W
- Area: 157 acres (64 ha)
- Built: 1764
- Architect: Jefferson, Thomas; Percival, John
- Architectural style: Late 19th And 20th Century Revivals, Mid 19th Century Revival, Early Republic
- NRHP reference No.: 95000023
- VLR No.: 185-0023

Significant dates
- Added to NRHP: February 8, 1995
- Designated VLR: October 19, 1994

The Charlotte Court House Historic District is a national historic district located at Charlotte Court House, Charlotte County, Virginia. The district includes 46 contributing buildings, 2 contributing sites, 3 contributing structures, and 2 contributing objects in Charlotte Court House. The district is centered on the separately listed Charlotte County Courthouse. Other notable buildings include the former county jail (1936), Brick Tavern (1820), Charlotte County Farm Bureau building, St. John's Masonic Lodge (1852), Charlotte County Public Library (1810, 1836), Village Presbyterian Church and cemetery (1835), Charlotte Court House United Methodist Church (1841), Diamond Hill (c. 1840), Villeview (c. 1820, 1832), W. B. Ramsey House (c. 1850), Charlotte County Elementary School (1908), and Randolph-Henry High School (1939–1940).

It was listed on the National Register of Historic Places in 1995.
