= Isaac Dabbs =

American politician

- Born: Ca. late 1840s Charlotte County, Virginia
- Occupations: Politician, brickyard laborer
- Years active: 1875–1877
- Political party: Republican
- Spouse(s): Sarah Ann Brown (1869 - 1884); Sarah Catherine Howell (1898, until his death)
- Children: 2, with Sarah Ann

Isaac Dabbs was an American politician who served on the Virginia House of Delegates from 1875 to 1877.

== Biography ==
Dabbs was born into slavery on a plantation in Charlotte County, Virginia. As slave births were not frequently recorded, there is no exact date for his birth, but he was likely born in the late 1840s. He was freed at some undetermined point in time and on December 29, 1869, he married Sarah Ann Brown, with whom he had at least two sons. Dabbs was illiterate for most of his life, a fact that had been reported upon in literature about his political career, but it is believed that he learned to read and write by 1900 according to census reports. After his wife Sarah died in 1884, Dabbs would remarry in 1898, a marriage that produced no children. Dabbs moved to Baltimore two years later, where he was recorded in his ward's census on April 27, 1910. He is believed to have died shortly after this point, as he was not in the following census.

== Political career ==
Dabbs ran as part of the Radical Republicans and was their candidate for the House of Delegates in 1875. While Dabbs won the popular vote and served as the Charlotte County Delegate for two years, he was ultimately not chosen as the Radical Republicans' candidate for the following election. He continued to serve as a faithful party member and acted as a canvasser for the party's candidate for the 1883 elections for the House of Delegates.

== See also ==
- African American officeholders from the end of the Civil War until before 1900
