= Maple Roads =

Historic house in Virginia, United States

- U.S. National Register of Historic Places
- Virginia Landmarks Register
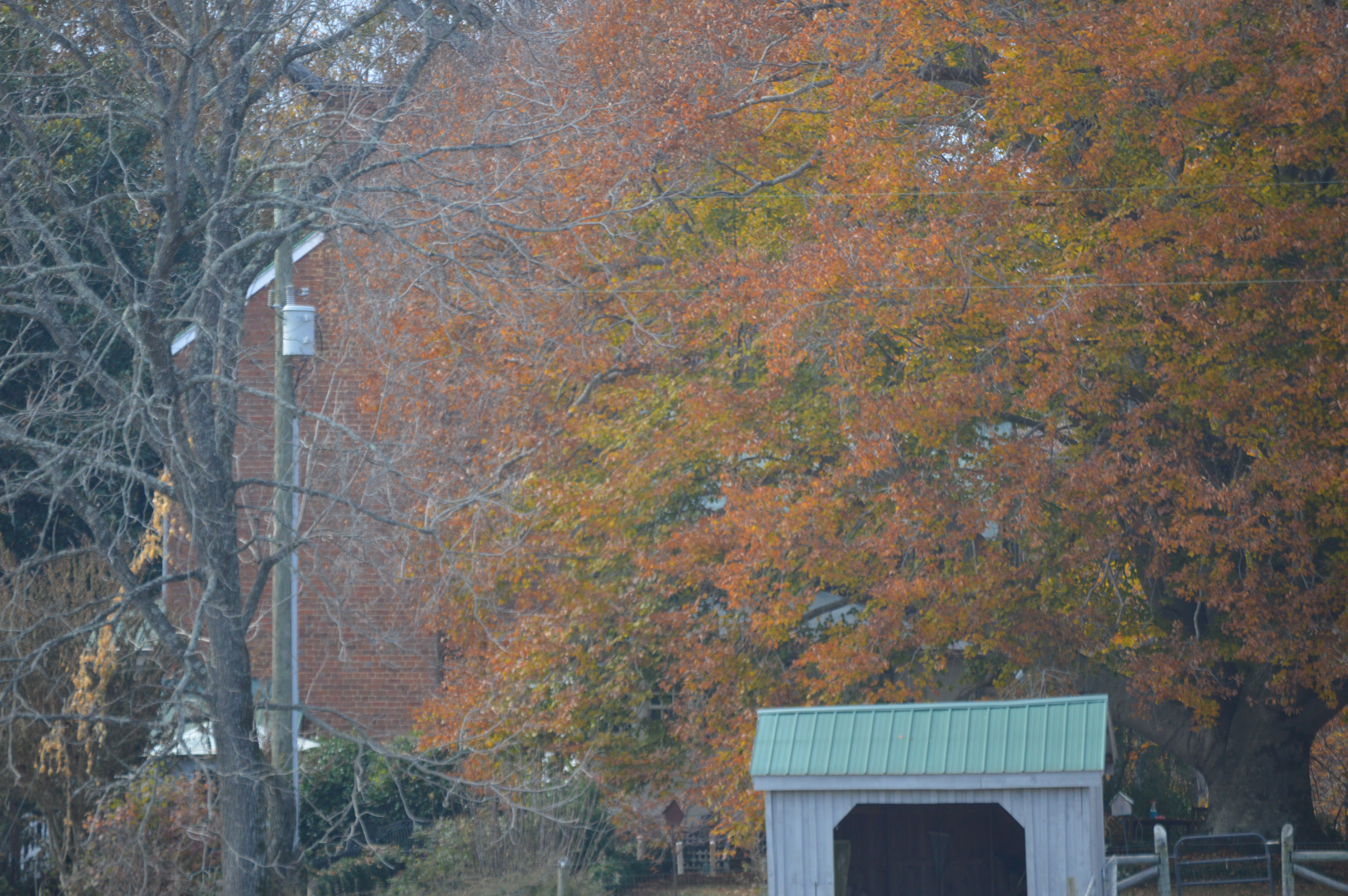
- Seen through the trees

- Location within Virginia Location within the United States
- Location: 1325 Richardson Rd., Keysville, Virginia
- Coordinates: 37°3′44″N 78°31′21″W
- Area: 26 acres (11 ha)
- Architectural style: Federal
- NRHP reference No.: 02000999
- VLR No.: 019-0057

Significant dates
- Added to NRHP: September 14, 2002
- Designated VLR: June 12, 2002

Maple Roads is a historic plantation house located near Keysville, Charlotte County, Virginia. It was built in the early-19th century, and is a two-story, five-bay, brick dwelling in the Federal style. It is a single-pile I-house with a 1 1/2-story rear wing. Also on the property are a contributing 19th century one-room wood framed office with a steep standing seam metal gable roof, a simple early-20th century wood frame barn, and a family cemetery.

It was listed on the National Register of Historic Places in 2002.
