= Wade Archeological Site =

Archaeological site in Virginia, United States

- U.S. National Register of Historic Places
- Virginia Landmarks Register
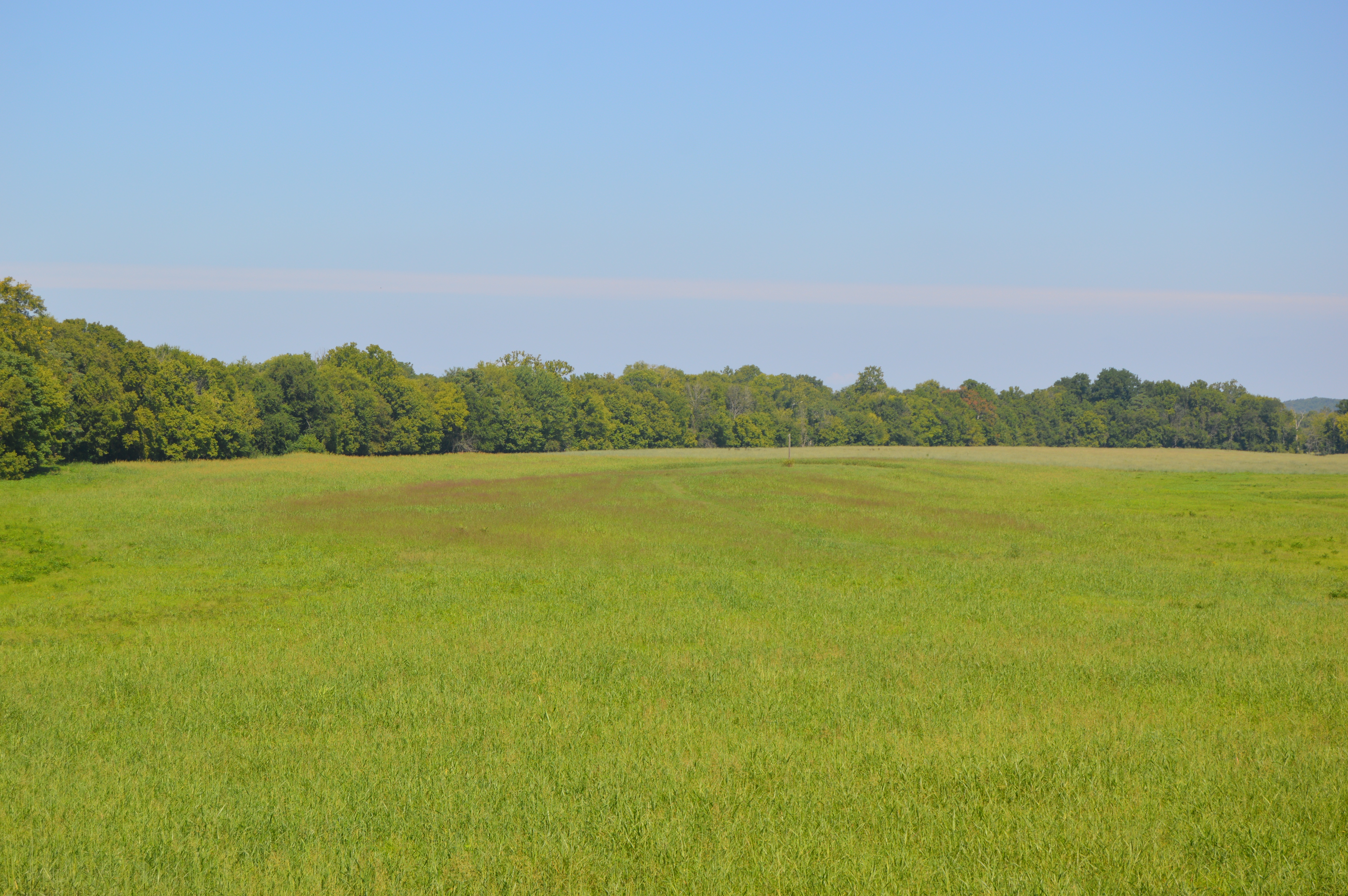
- Distant view from near the bridge

- Location within Virginia Location within the United States
- Location: 1035 Fort Hill Trail, Randolph, Virginia
- Coordinates: 36°53′13″N 78°42′17″W
- Area: 5 acres (2.0 ha)
- NRHP reference No.: 03001194
- VLR No.: 019-5200

Significant dates
- Added to NRHP: October 23, 2003
- Designated VLR: June 18, 2003

The Wade Archeological Site is a prehistoric archaeological site located at the Staunton River Battlefield State Park in Randolph, Charlotte County, Virginia. It is a Saponi Native American village site from the Late Woodland Period, 270 meters by 70 meters, dating to A.D. 1000 to 1450.

It was listed on the National Register of Historic Places in 2003.
