= Gravel Hill (Charlotte Court House, Virginia) =

Historic house in Virginia, United States

- U.S. National Register of Historic Places
- Virginia Landmarks Register
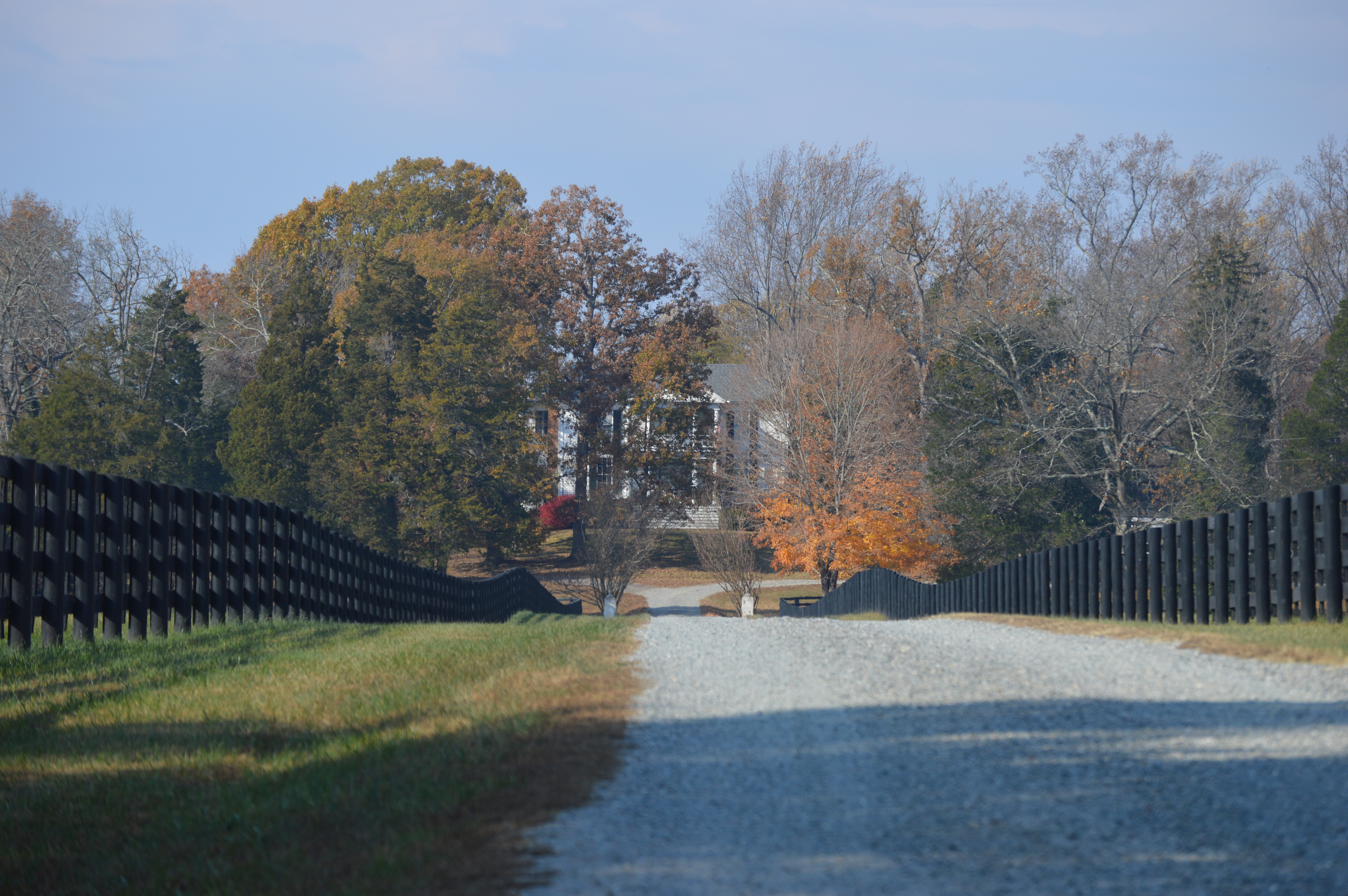
- Roadside view

- Location within Virginia Location within the United States
- Location: 3990 Fearstown Rd., near Charlotte Court House, Virginia
- Coordinates: 37°2′14″N 78°44′41″W
- Area: 81 acres (33 ha)
- Built: 1847, 1912
- Architect: Dabbs & Thomas
- Architectural style: Greek Revival
- NRHP reference No.: 01000150
- VLR No.: 019-0006

Significant dates
- Added to NRHP: February 16, 2001
- Designated VLR: December 6, 2000

Gravel Hill is a historic plantation house located near Charlotte Court House, Charlotte County, Virginia. It was built in 1847, and is a two-story, three-bay frame dwelling in the Greek Revival style. A two-story frame addition was built in 1912. It features a two-story pedimented Doric order portico. Also on the property are a contributing 2 1/2-story, log guest house typical of the picturesque "rustic lodge" structures of the 1920s; large wooden barn on a stone foundation; and smokehouse.

It was listed on the National Register of Historic Places in 2001.
