= Charlotte County Courthouse (Virginia) =

- U.S. National Register of Historic Places
- U.S. Historic district – Contributing property
- Virginia Landmarks Register
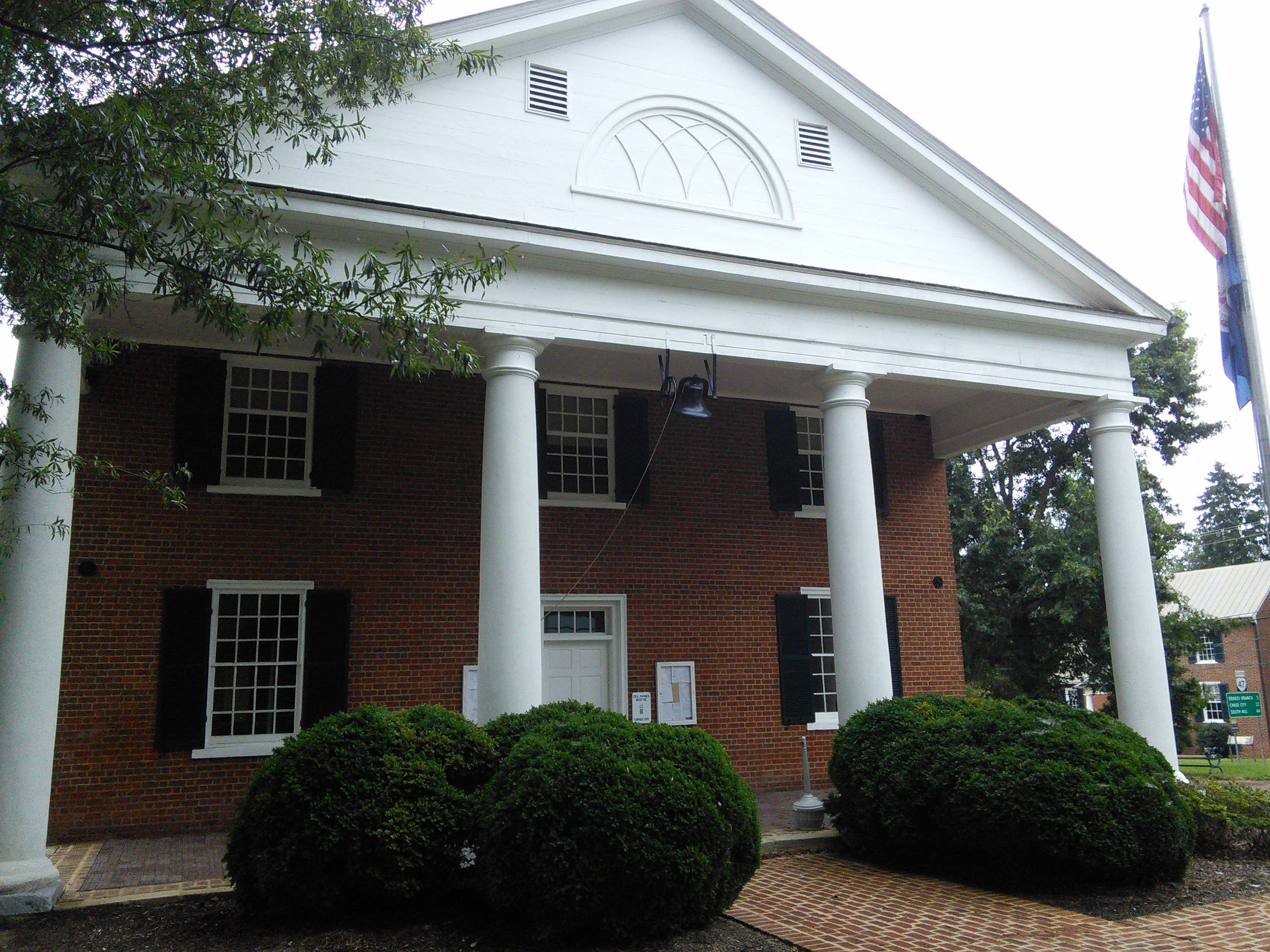
- The courthouse in September 2014

- Location within Virginia
- Location: 125 David Bruce Ave., Charlotte Court House, Virginia
- Coordinates: 37.0563°N 78.6377°W
- Area: 2 acres (0.81 ha)
- Built: 1821-1823
- Architect: Jefferson, Thomas; Percival, John
- Architectural style: Early Republic, Late Victorian, Roman Revival
- NRHP reference No.: 80004178
- VLR No.: 185-0001

Significant dates
- Added to NRHP: May 7, 1980
- Designated VLR: February 19, 1980

The Charlotte County Courthouse is a historic county courthouse complex located at Charlotte Court House, Charlotte County, Virginia. It was built in 1821–1823, and is a brick, temple-form structure, measuring approximately 45 feet wide and 71 feet deep. It was listed on the National Register of Historic Places in 1980 and is in the Charlotte Court House Historic District.

It features a tetrastyle Tuscan order portico with whitewashed stuccoed columns. It is based on plans supplied by Thomas Jefferson and is a prototype for numerous Roman Revival court buildings erected in Virginia in the 1830s and 1840s. Also on the property is a two-story, three-bay, brick office building used as a law office and a late Victorian Clerk's office, with a distinctive entrance tower and arched entrance.

Joseph R. Holmes, a delegate to the 1868 Virginia Constitutional Convention, was murdered outside the courthouse in 1869. He and fellow delegate Edward Nelson, who testified about the murder, were both Republicans and African American.
