= Salem School (Red Oak, Virginia) =

- U.S. National Register of Historic Places
- Virginia Landmarks Register
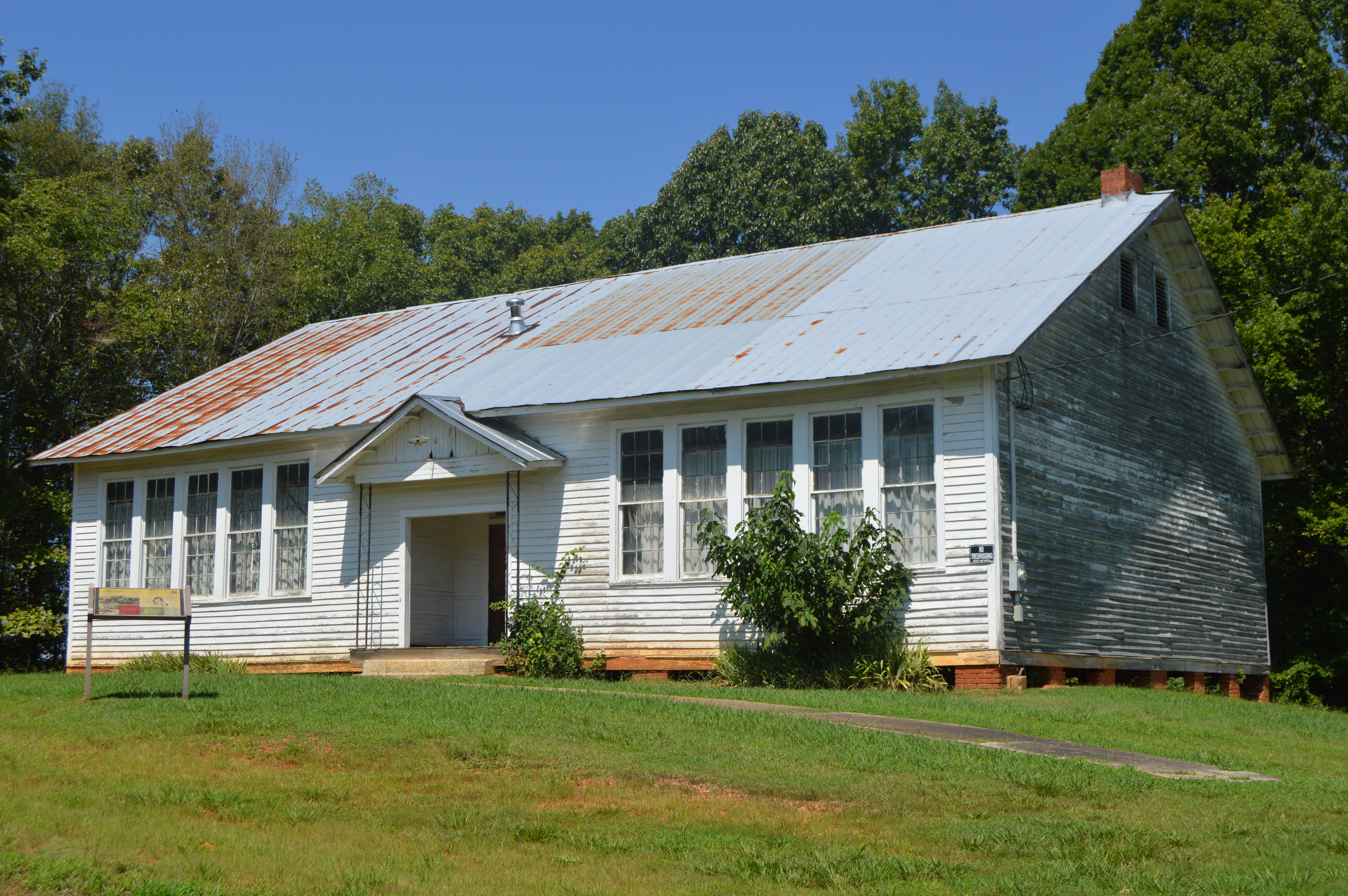
- Front and eastern side

- Location within Virginia Location within the United States
- Location: Jct. of Rtes. 608 and 632, Red Oak, Virginia
- Coordinates: 36°46′10″N 78°38′14″W
- Area: 2 acres (0.81 ha)
- Built: 1923–1924
- NRHP reference No.: 98001309
- VLR No.: 019-5121

Significant dates
- Added to NRHP: October 30, 1998
- Designated VLR: September 14, 1998

Salem School (1923–1959) is a historic school building and former black school, located near Red Oak, Charlotte County, Virginia, U.S.. It was listed on the National Register of Historic Places in 1998; and listed on the Virginia Landmarks Register in 1998.

== History ==
It was built in 1923–1924 as a Rosenwald School for African American students during the Jim Crow era, and is a one-story, three-bay frame rectangular structure with weatherboard siding. It stands on a brick pier foundation.

In 1930, the Central High School in Charlotte Court House, Virginia was the first public school for African American students in the area. The school operated until 1959, when it was closed due to desegregation of the Charlotte County school system.

== See also ==
- Keysville Mission Industrial Academy (1898–1957) in Keysville, Virginia
