= Annefield (Saxe, Virginia) =

Historic house in Virginia, United States

- U.S. National Register of Historic Places
- Virginia Landmarks Register
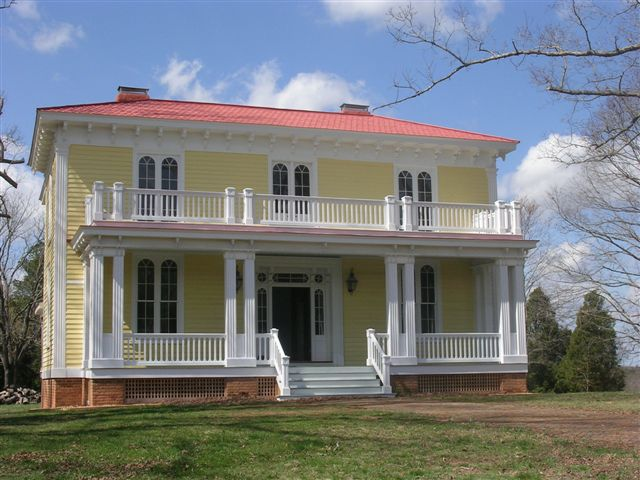
- Annefield, September 2011

- Location within Virginia Location within the United States
- Location: 3200 Sunny Side Rd., Saxe, Virginia
- Coordinates: 36°55′42″N 78°37′22″W
- Area: Southside
- Built: 1858
- Architect: Jacob W. Holt (attributed)
- Architectural style: Italianate
- NRHP reference No.: 09000920
- VLR No.: 019-5208

Significant dates
- Designated: November 12, 2009
- Designated VLR: September 17, 2008

Annefield is a historic plantation house located at Saxe, Charlotte County, Virginia. It was constructed in 1858, and is a well-preserved example of the Italianate style villas being constructed during the antebellum period in northern North Carolina and Southern Virginia by master builder Jacob W. Holt (1811–1880). Annefield is one of only two known plantation houses in Charlotte County attributed to Holt, a Virginia-born carpenter, builder, and contractor who moved to Warrenton, North Carolina, and established one of North Carolina's largest antebellum building firms. Architectural historian Catherine W. Bishir notes: “Drawing upon popular architectural books, Holt developed a distinctive style that encompassed Greek Revival and Italianate features adapted to local preferences and the capabilities of his workshop. In addition to the more than twenty buildings documented as his work, stylistic evidence and family traditions also attribute as many as seventy more to Holt and his shop.”

Annefield is attributed to Holt's shop because it shares many stylistic features with several documented buildings. On 17 September 2009 the property was placed on the Virginia Landmarks Register, and on 12 November 2009 it was listed on the National Register of Historic Places because it is a locally significant example of a relatively rare form of high-style architecture that is the work of a master builder. In addition to the main house at Annefield, stylistic evidence suggests that Holt also designed and built the Kitchen/Quarter and the Smokehouse. Other secondary buildings and sites on the property contribute to Annefield's importance as a relatively intact antebellum farm complex in Charlotte County, Virginia.

The property is located east of the village of Saxe in lower Charlotte County, and comprises approximately 190 acres between Horsepen Creek (to the north) and State Route 612 (Sunny Side Road) to the south. Open fields, woods, orchards and vineyards combine to form a bucolic landscape that has changed little in the past two hundred years. Other significant landscape features include two small ponds and an oak-lined drive approaching the main house from the south.

== History ==
In 1760, Abraham Martin (1716–1771) patented 4,060 acres of land (including 989 acres already patented in 1746) on Horsepen Creek in what was then Lunenburg County. In 1770, Martin conveyed 899 acres of this land to William Jameson (1745–1785), a native of Glasgow, Scotland. Jameson settled the property with his wife Anne Read, the daughter of Clement Read and Mary Hill of Bushy Forest, the wealthiest and most powerful family in the region. Jameson's alliance with a leading family in the county was an advantageous one, for he secured a number of important commissions in spite of his foreign birth, including County Justice (1772 and 1784), Vestryman of Cornwall Parish (1778), Escheator (1778), Militia Lieutenant (1778), and Militia Captain (1779).

It was Jameson who named the plantation Annefield, presumably in honor of his wife. The name first appears in the county records when the last will & testament of William Jameson dated 28 July 1784 was proved on 2 September 1785. In anticipation of a journey overseas, Jameson wrote:

“Whereas I am about undertaking a voyage to Great Britain from which it may be the will of the Almighty I may never return... ...To my wife Anne – my manor plantation and mansion house of Annefield, with all and sundry the appurtenances thereof during the term of her natural life... I leave to her disposal the Manor of Annefield, at her death, to which of our sons she thinks proper, still observing that the said plantation and original tract must be considered a part of such son’s heritage or proportion of land.”

Anne (Read) Jameson married as her second husband Col. Richard Elliott in 1787, who was dead by 2 November 1796 when his will was recorded in Charlotte County. On 16 March 1801, Anne Elliott, joined by her sons Clement R. Jameson and Edmund Jameson conveyed this land (apparently surveyed and found to be 908 acres and called by them the “Horsepen Plantation”) to Philip Goode, Sr. of Charlotte County. On 2 December 1805, Philip Goode conveyed the property to his two sons Thomas and Delanson Goode, who in turn conveyed it to their neighbor Jeremiah Williams in 1810. Williams died the next year, and the property passed to his daughter, Sarah Williams Hutcherson. After the death of Sarah's husband, Collier, she married Hillary Moseley, Sr. The early nineteenth-century house that is located on the property was likely constructed during the Moseley's ownership. Evidence gleaned through deed research indicates that the site of the original (eighteenth century) house on Annefield is not located on the current property, so the house was likely not part of the original Annefield's domestic complex.

In 1855, Richard E. Moseley (a son of Sarah and Hillary) conveyed 870 acres on big and little Horsepen Creeks to Hillery Mackiness Langston Goode, the youngest son of Hillery and Sarah (Bacon) Goode of Charlotte County. Goode was a prosperous planter and merchant, who was named a County Justice in 1852 (but resigned in 1853), and served as Postmaster of Wylliesburg, Virginia, in 1855. He later represented the citizens of Charlotte County in the Virginia House of Delegates from 1878 to 1881. Physical evidence suggests that Goode commissioned prominent and fashionable builder Jacob W. Holt to construct a house on his land that befit his wealth and standing in the community. It is not known how Goode may have come to know Holt, but the builder was well known throughout the greater region. Beginning in 1859, the value of buildings on Goode's 870-acre tract jumped from under $1,000 to $4,370, reflecting the construction of Goode's new “Italian Villa.”

In 1860, the U.S. Census indicated that Goode owned 42 slaves, 500 acres of improved land, 403 acres of unimproved land, and that the farm at Annefield was valued at $18,000. His livestock were worth $1,600, and included horses, cattle, oxen, mules, sheep, and pigs. The farm produced 528 bushels of wheat, 700 bushels of corn, 300 bushels of oats, and 18,000 pounds of tobacco. At least two of Goode's sons served in the Civil War just a few years later. Hillery Langston Goode (1846–1921 or 1925) attended the Virginia Military Institute (Class of 1867) and saw action at New Market, Virginia, along with other V.M.I. cadets in May 1864. Richard Bennett Goode (1845–1913) enlisted in the First Richmond Howitzers at age 17, and saw action at Second Manassas, Orange Court House, Gettysburg, and was paroled at Appomattox. A third son, William E. Goode, may have served in the 52nd Virginia Regiment, but this is unconfirmed at this time.

Agriculture continued to be an integral part of life at Annefield during the 1880s, although at $5,000, the farm was not as valuable as it was before the American Civil War. One hundred and fifty acres of the property were tilled, 20 acres were in meadows, and 100 acres were wooded. Generally, Goode owned less livestock than in 1860, and his grain production had declined as well. Fifteen acres of oats produced 60 bushels, 30 acres of corn produced 800 bushels, 11 acres of wheat produced 180 bushels, and 6 acres of tobacco produced 3,000 pounds (1/5 of 1860s production). His orchard occupied at least 10 acres; 100 apple trees produced 500 bushels, and 100 peach trees produced 200 bushels.

Hillery M.L. Goode and his wife Sarah executed a Deed of Trust on 21 April 1870 with Zachariah Bugg to secure certain debts. Apparently they failed to meet the terms of this Deed of Trust, for in September 1882, 470 acres of the land was sold at public auction to John Booker of Richmond. The Trustee's Sale advertisement that appeared in the Charlotte Gazette of Thursday, August 3, 1882, read, in part:

"At MOSSINGFORD DEPOT, R. & Dan R.R. The Tract of Land on which H.M.L. Goode now resides, containing 889 ½ acres, more or less, lying in Charlotte county, Va., not far from Mossingford, on the R. & D. R.R. The improvements consist of a nice dwelling of six rooms, with all convenient outhouses, barns, &c. Has a large and valuable Orchard. Portions of the tract are heavily timbered; has fine bottom land on Little and Big Horsepen Creeks. This is a truly valuable farm. It is susceptible to being divided into two tracts, and will be sold as such if desired by bidders."

The farm was indeed sold in two tracts, for the Land Tax Book for 1884 notes that Goode was taxed on 889 1/2 acres of land on Horsepen Creek and his residence is given as Tennessee. In the Land Tax Book for 1885 he was taxed on 419 1/2 acres, and his residence is still given as Tennessee, with the records noting that 470 acres had been sold to John Booker of Richmond by W.E. Holmes, Special Commissioner. The property was almost immediately transferred to Robert D. Adams (born 1834), a farmer, who held Annefield until 1908, when he and his wife Laura conveyed it to Henry C. Marshall (born 1870), superintendent of the nearby State Experimental Farm, in 1910. In October 1942, Marshall and his wife Emma Gray conveyed the property to James W. Scott (1901–1963) and Julia T. Scott. The Scott family held the property until 1992, when approximately half of the land was conveyed to a lumber company, while the remaining 190 acres with the house and outbuildings was sold to investors from North Carolina. These investors maintained the property and in 2005 conveyed it to the owners that undertook a substantial rehabilitation of the house and in 2009 listed the property in the Virginia Landmarks Register and the National Register of Historic Places.

== Significance ==
Annefield's significance is derived from the fact that it is a relatively rare example of the well-developed Italianate architectural style in Charlotte County, Virginia. Elements of Jacob W. Holt's interpretation of the Italianate style within Annefield include a stereotypical Holt front entryway featuring double doors with arched panels, surrounded by arched sidelights, and a round-ended transom flanked by a pair of round “pinwheel” windows. Other features include a fenestration pattern displaying pairs of arched windows matching those found in the entryway, a deep, bracketed cornice, and a mantel design that seems to be unique to Holt: a progressively-styled Italianate mantel from William H. Ranlett's The Architect (Volume I, plate 52) with the insertion of a Greek Revival-style frieze roll just above the firebox opening.

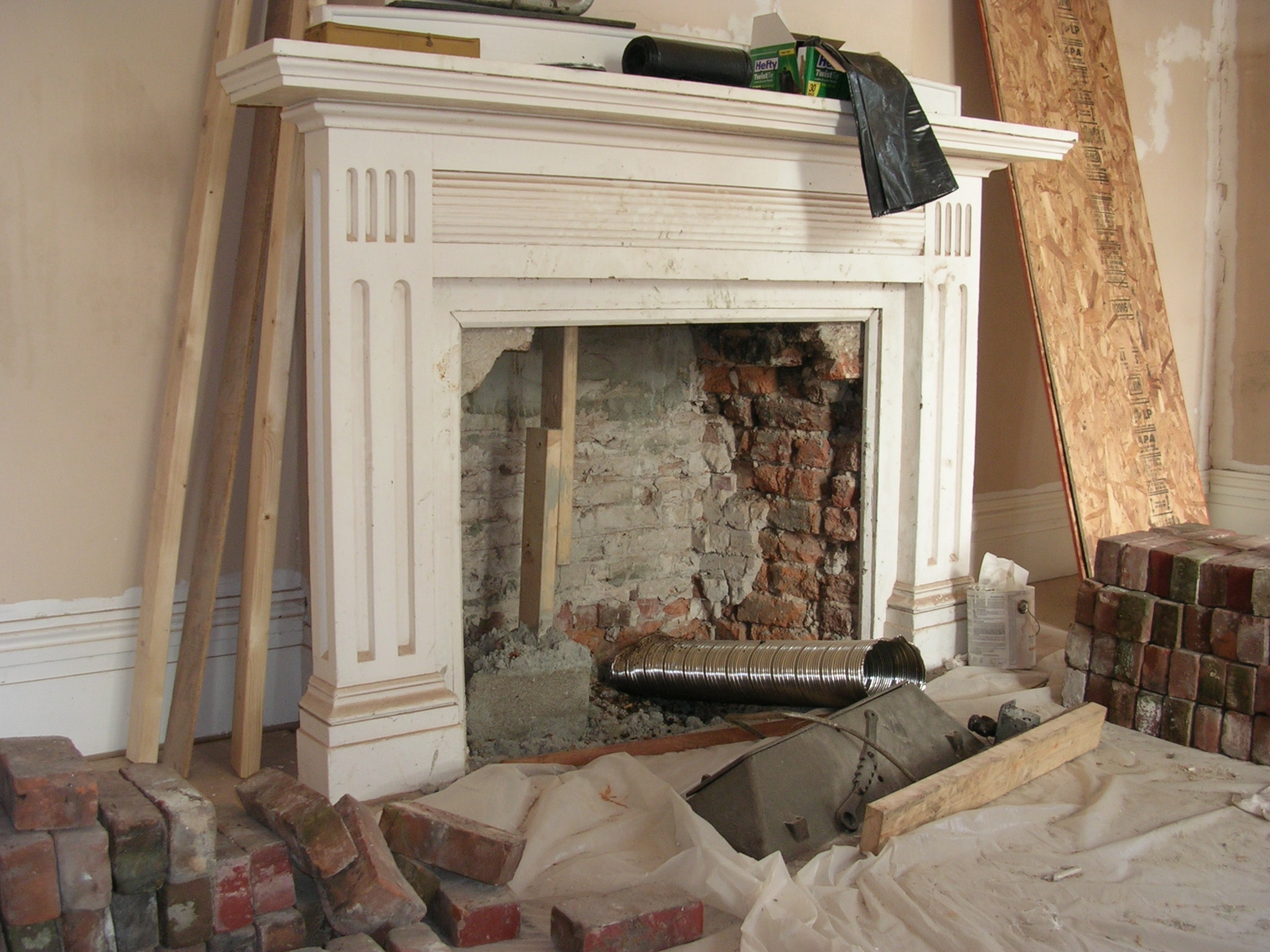
Parlor mantle c. 2005 during restoration

Another factor contributing to the significance of Annefield is the house's attribution to Jacob W. Holt, a prominent master builder of Piedmont Virginia and North Carolina during the middle to late nineteenth century. Holt performed the overwhelming majority of his work in Mecklenburg County, Virginia, and Warren County, North Carolina. Outside of Mecklenburg County, Holt is only credited with constructing (or influencing the construction of) nine Virginia houses. According to noted Holt scholar Catherine W. Bishir, only two Charlotte County houses (including Annefield) are attributed to the builder.

Generally, buildings that are attributed to Holt are placed in this category because they possess stylistic similarities with other buildings that are documented to have been built by J.W. Holt. A prime example of a Holt-documented house is Dr. Robert D. Baskerville's Eureka in Mecklenburg County, Virginia. An 1857 contract between Baskerville and Holt specified the design to be a modified version of a plate in Ranlett's Architect. The building was to be completed by 15 August 1858 at a cost of $4,885.00 (~$137,437 in 2024). While the floor plan of the villa described by Ranlett was used, the façade elevation was modified to suit the needs of the client. Mantels, windows, and other architectural details for Eureka did not follow Ranlett's specifications, but rather conformed in character to what Holt had included in previous buildings. According to Catherine Bishir, Eureka was “perhaps Holt's grandest private project, bearing the stamp of his standardized detail but in its dramatic towered form and atypical plan reflecting the productive cooperation of builder and adventuresome client.” Franklin County, North Carolina's Vine Hill is also documented to have been built by Jacob W. Holt by a 5 September 1856 contract. The front entryway and Palladian windows of Eureka and Vine Hill, both documented Holt houses, are identical to that found at Annefield.

== Plantation complex ==
The Main House, c. 1858. Sited on the highest point of the property, the house was built in three stages. The oldest part of the house dates from 1858 and consists of a large main block (measuring approximately 50 feet by 20 feet) with a center hall flanking a parlor and a bedroom; a hallway and two bedrooms are located upstairs. A two-story addition in the rear encompasses a single-story section that is original to the house. This section was subordinate to the main block, both in style and scale. Construction of interior doorways and chimneys suggests that this section was built at the same time as the main block. If not, it was certainly in place by 1882, when a foreclosure sale notice described the dwelling as containing six rooms (two rooms on each floor in the main block, with two additional rooms in the one-story rear section). This rear section was enlarged to two stories in the early 21st century.

Two interior brick chimneys rise up from the dwelling's hipped roof, which is covered with tin shingles. The roof is accented by a deep, bracketed cornice that is typical of Italianate style buildings of the period. The entire house is covered by smooth weatherboard siding, and the corners of the main block of the building are highlighted by fluted Doric pilasters. A foundation of brick laid in the Flemish bond pattern supports the oldest sections of the house (this is relatively new brickwork. Evidence in the cellar indicates that the bond may have originally been five to six course common bond). A parged concrete masonry unit foundation supports a late nineteenth or early twentieth century addition to the rear.

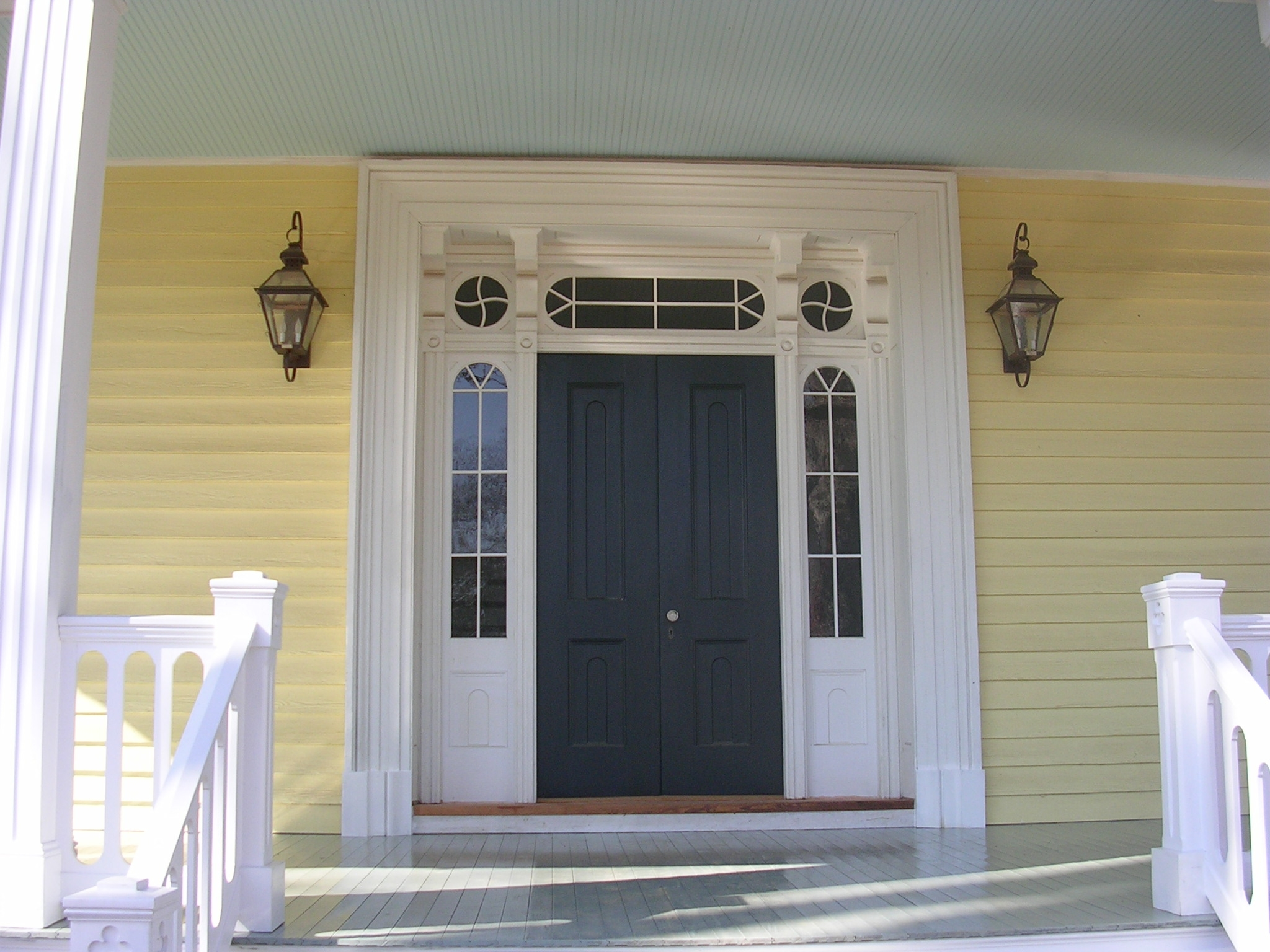
Typical Holt entry

A full-length, one-story portico graces the front façade. The portico was completed in 2009, and its design is inspired by the one found on the front façade of Cherry Hill (Warren County, North Carolina), which was built by John A. Waddell, a Jacob W. Holt-school builder. The portico features a bracketed cornice, a balustrade which creates a balcony accessible from double doors in the central bay of the second floor, and is supported by six sets of square, fluted columns. The house's main entryway is located in the central bay of the front façade, and consists of a pair of paneled doors surrounded by unique sidelights and a transom punctuated by circular “pinwheel” windows in each corner. This entryway is identical to that of Vine Hill (Franklin County, North Carolina), which was built by Jacob W. Holt in 1856.

The main block of the villa is set apart by the use of double-arched windows set within a square casing, a motif consistent throughout the main block of house, taking the form of a simple Roman arch in the front door and the interior doors of the principal rooms. The form of the front windows is identical to that of Engleside (Warrenton, North Carolina) and Pool Rock (Vance County, North Carolina), both of which are attributed to Jacob W. Holt. Holt likely received his inspiration from Ranlett's “Italian Villa Design #31.”

A central hall with staircase on the first floor is flanked by two rooms on each side. Each room opens into the stair hall, and the rooms on each side of the hall connect via a doorway as well. To the rear of the house, a one-story porch that was added in the late nineteenth or early twentieth century has been enclosed, and now contains a kitchen, bathroom and pantry.

The house as originally built had four main rooms on the first floor, and two rooms on the second floor. The house as currently configured has five main rooms on the first floor and three on the second floor. The principal rooms are heated by interior chimneys located between the front and rear rooms. Interior details continue the motifs of the exterior. The doors and windows on the first floor have massive casings with large bases. The mantels of the two front rooms combine Greek Revival proportions and a fluted frieze roll with Italianate brackets. These two mantels are identical to an example from Engleside (the John White House) in Warrenton, North Carolina. Mantels in the rear rooms and on the second floor are much simpler that those found in the two (front) primary chambers.

Quarter/Kitchen House, c. 1858. The quarter/kitchen house lies to the rear (west) of the house and measures approximately 34 by 16 feet. The hipped roof is covered by pre-formed, ribbed tin panels which are not original to the building, and the exterior of the quarter is clad in wooden weatherboard siding. A simple box cornice highlights the transition between the roof and the vertical walls. The front façade of the building is divided into four bays. The central two bays are occupied by window openings (the sash themselves are missing), and the outer two bays are occupied by doorways. This fenestration pattern is repeated on the west (rear) façade, and a window opening is located on each end of the building as well. The structure of the building consists of mortise-and-tenon timber-frame construction, with studs spaced roughly every twenty four inches. Floor joists are made of logs that have been worked flat on the top face. The wall finish on the interior consists of butt-joined horizontal boards that have been limewashed. Evidence in the wall and roof structure suggests that the interior space was once divided into two rooms, with a central chimney serving both spaces. In addition to the kitchen, this building probably contained living space for the cook and her family. The 1860 Census Slave Schedule indicates that Goode owned 10 slave houses or quarters, and this may have been one of them. The location of the others is unknown.

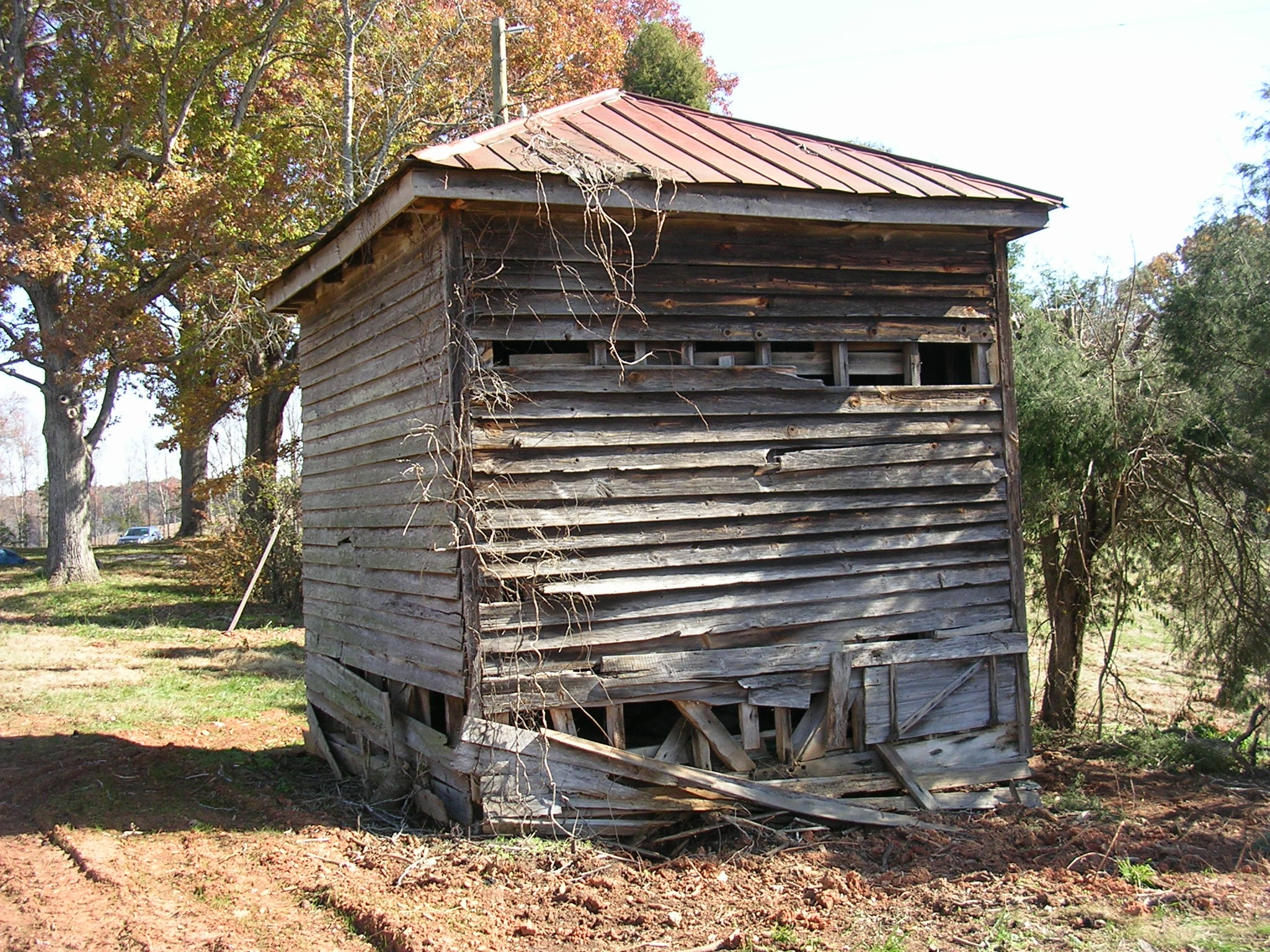
Smokehouse c. 2005 prior to restoration

Smokehouse, c. 1858. Measuring approximately 14 by 14 feet, the smokehouse is clad in weatherboard and covered by a pyramidical roof of standing seam, galvanized metal (a later replacement). The board-and-batten entry door is located on the east façade. The interior exhibits the building's timber-frame construction, and a wooden floor is broken in the center by a sunken firepit.

Office, Early 20th Century. To the west of the smokehouse lies a small, 12 foot by 10 foot building that may have served as an office for a farm manager or similar individual. The building may date to the period of the main house, but construction features such as wire nails, diagonal sheathing and a roof that is not consistent with the other Holt-designed buildings (i.e., gabled instead of hipped), suggests that the building was constructed in the beginning of the twentieth century. Like the other outbuildings in the cluster, the building's roof consists of pre-formed, galvanized metal. The exterior is clad in unpainted weatherboards. A board and batten door provides access on the north façade, and the remnants of a four-over-four sash window provided light on the south façade. A small, square, brick chimney is located in the interior of the southwestern corner of the building's sole room, and contains a stovepipe hole.

Tobacco Barns, 19th Century. Located approximately 700 feet north of the main house is a pair of tobacco barns. These buildings each measure approximately 16 by 16 feet, are constructed of squared, lap-notched, rough-hewn logs, and are covered with galvanized metal roofs. The barns rest on dry-laid stone foundations, and remnants of vertical board-and-batten siding remain on both. The interiors of both barns exhibit evidence of the smoke-curing process, including numerous rounded poles running from end to end to facilitate hanging tobacco.

Dairy Barn, 1954. West of the main house's complex of domestic outbuildings lies a large dairy barn that is constructed of concrete masonry units. The main block of the barn is one and a half stories in height, and is covered by a gambrel roof of pre-formed galvanized metal sheets. The upper story contains a storage loft, and is clad in weatherboards. Attached to the southern façade of the building is a one-story wing (also of concrete masonry units) that is fenestrated by six pane steel windows. Two large concrete silos rise from the western façade of the barn.

House, c. 1830. Approximately 1,100 feet southwest of Annefield is a two cell, 1 1/2-story frame house that probably dates from the second quarter of the 19th century. The oldest section of the house measures approximately 21 feet by 18 feet, is covered by a galvanized metal gable roof, is clad with vertical boards (covered by asphalt siding), and rests on a dry-laid stone foundation. A massive stone chimney rises from the east gable end of the house. The front façade of the building presents three bays, with an entry door in the center. This door opens into the primary chamber of the first floor, which measures approximately 17 feet by 18 feet, and was heated by a fireplace that is surrounded by a simple, Greek Revival-inspired mantle. An enclosed, dog-leg staircase leads to the garret from this room. The smaller chamber measures approximately 13 1/2 feet by 18 feet, and contains a door that leads to a shed-roofed addition, which was likely built in the early 20th century. The garret is divided into two rooms, and is lit by two casement windows on the east end (flanking the chimney) and one (off-center) casement window on the west end. The entire interior of the building is plastered or shows evidence of plastering, and riven lath can be seen in many sections of the house. Small, open porches are located on the front (west) façade and the rear (southeast) façade. Based on the presence of plastered walls (even in the garret), it is unlikely that this dwelling was constructed for use by slaves, and may have been occupied by a member of the Moseley family or a plantation manager.

Slave Cemetery, 19th century. According to local tradition, a slave cemetery is located on the grounds of Annefield, approximately 1,700 feet northeast of the main house, near Horsepen Creek (UTM 17S 0711948 4089808). This area is covered by Periwinkle (Vinca minor), which is commonly used as a groundcover planting in Virginia cemeteries. A number of relatively young eastern black walnut (Juglans nigra) trees now shade the site. Evidence of at least two graves can be found via the presence of standing fieldstones and slight depressions in the earth. However, a methodical survey of the site is likely to yield evidence of additional graves. Previous owners of the property are known to have owned slaves, Hillery Goode owned more than forty slaves in 1860, and at least four of Mr. Goode's slaves were over sixty years of age at that time.

== Bibliography ==
Ailsworth, Timothy S., ed. Charlotte County, Rich Indeed. Charlotte Court House, Virginia: Charlotte County Board of Supervisors. 1979.

Bishir, Catherine W. “Jacob W. Holt: An American Builder”. Winterthur Portfolio, Vol. 16, No. 1 (Spring, 1981).

Bishir, Catherine W. Southern Built: American Architecture, Regional Practice. Charlottesville, Virginia: University of Virginia Press. 2006.

Blanton, Alison S., Mary A. Zirkle, and Stacy L. Marshall. Historic Architectural Survey of Charlotte County, Virginia. Roanoke, Virginia: Hill Studio, P.C. 1998.

Carrington, J. Cullen. Charlotte County, Virginia: Historical, Statistical, and Present Attractions. Richmond, Virginia: The Hermitage Press, Inc. 1907.

Charlotte County Land Records, Charlotte County Clerk of Court, Charlotte Court House, Virginia

Downing, Andrew Jackson. Victorian Cottage Residences. New York: Dover Publications, Inc. 1981.

Farmer, Charles J. In the Absence of Towns: Settlement and Country Trade in Southside Virginia, 1730–1800. Lanham, Maryland: Rowman & Littlefield Publishers, Inc. 1993.

Ginther, Herman. Captain Staunton’s River. Richmond, Virginia: The Dietz Press, Inc. 1968, 1999.

United States Census, Population Schedule, 1840, 1850, 1860, 1870, 1880, 1900, 1910, 1920, 1930

United States Census, Slave Schedule, 1860

United States Census, Agriculture Schedule, 1860, 1880

Virginia Landmarks Commission Staff. Eureka –National Register of Historic Places Nomination. Richmond, Virginia: Virginia Landmarks Commission. 1977. Eureka

Virginia Landmarks Commission Staff. Shadow Lawn –National Register of Historic Places Nomination. Richmond, Virginia: Virginia Landmarks Commission. 1981. Shadow Lawn

Wuellner, Margarita Jerabek and Elizabeth Barthold O’Brien. Sunnyside –National Register of Historic Places Nomination. Alexandria, Virginia: John Milner Associates, Inc. 1995. Sunnyside

== See also ==
- National Register of Historic Places Nomination for Annefield, Charlotte County, Virginia
- Bishir, Catherine W., "Jacob W. Holt: An American Builder"
- North Carolina Architects & Builders: A Biographical Dictionary
