= Randolph, Virginia =

Unincorporated community in Virginia, United States

Coordinates: 36°53′37″N 78°41′51″W

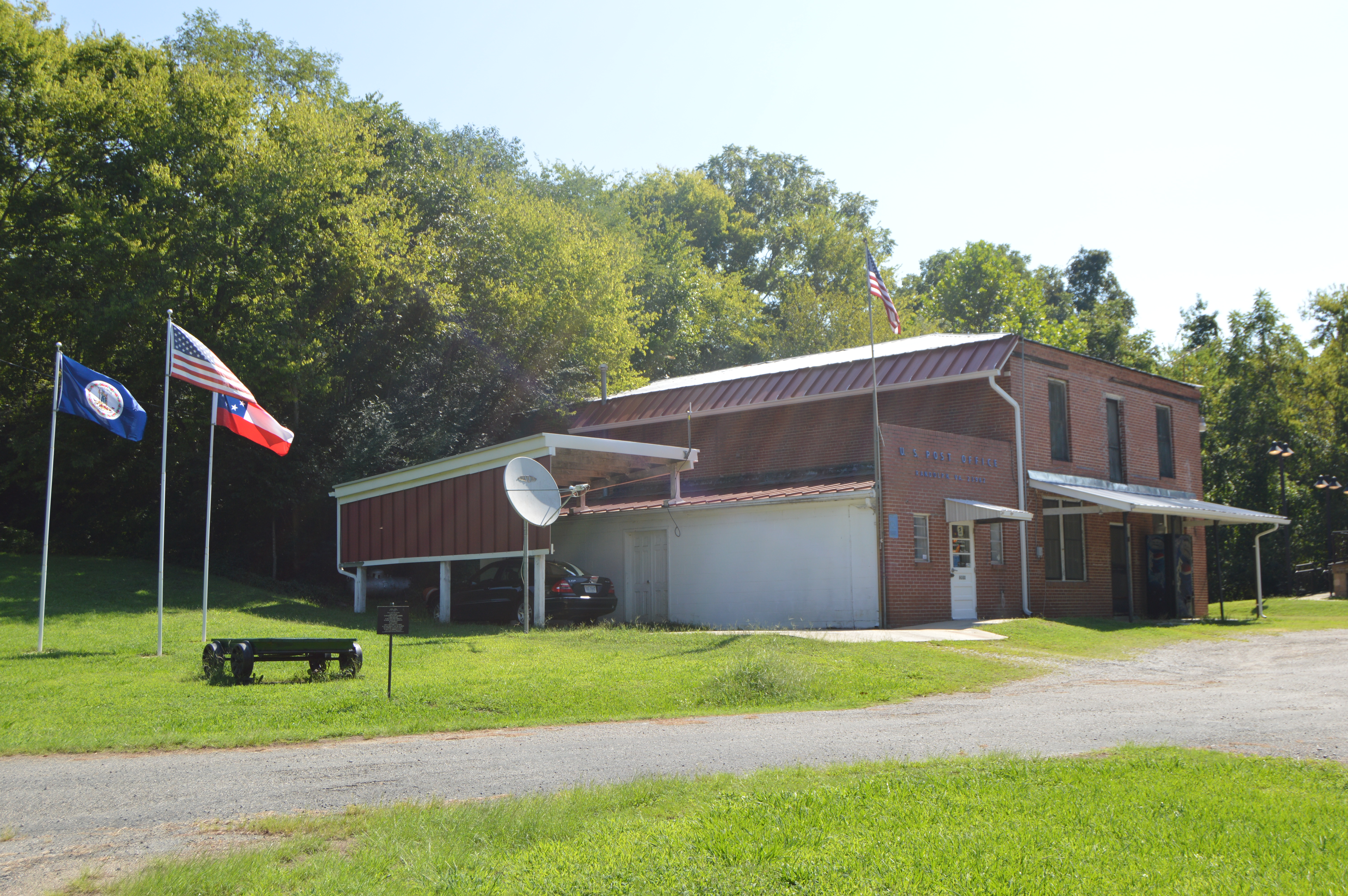
Post office

Randolph, formerly called Roanoke and Talcott, is a small unincorporated community in Charlotte County, Virginia, United States, near the Staunton River. Its elevation is 354 feet (108 m). The community is the home of Staunton River Battlefield State Park.

Mulberry Hill and the Wade Archeological Site are listed on the National Register of Historic Places.

== Climate ==
The climate in this area is characterized by hot, humid summers and generally mild to cool winters. According to the Köppen climate classification system, Randolph has a humid subtropical climate, abbreviated "Cfa" on climate maps.
