= Red Oak, Virginia =

Unincorporated community in Virginia, United States

- Unincorporated community
- Location within Virginia Location within the United States
- Coordinates: 36°47′04″N 78°36′54″W
- Country: United States
- State: Virginia
- County: Charlotte
- Elevation: 453 ft (138 m)
- Time zone: UTC-5 (Eastern (EST))
  - Summer (DST): UTC-4 (EDT)
- ZIP code: 23964
- Area code: 434
- GNIS feature ID: 1473057

Red Oak is an unincorporated community in Charlotte County, Virginia, United States. Red Oak is located on U.S. Route 15, 8.8 miles (14.2 km) west of Chase City. Red Oak has a post office with ZIP code 23964, which opened on July 31, 1839. The Salem School and the Toombs Tobacco Farm, both of which are listed on the National Register of Historic Places, are located in Red Oak.
