= Charlotte County, Virginia =

County in Virginia, United States

- County
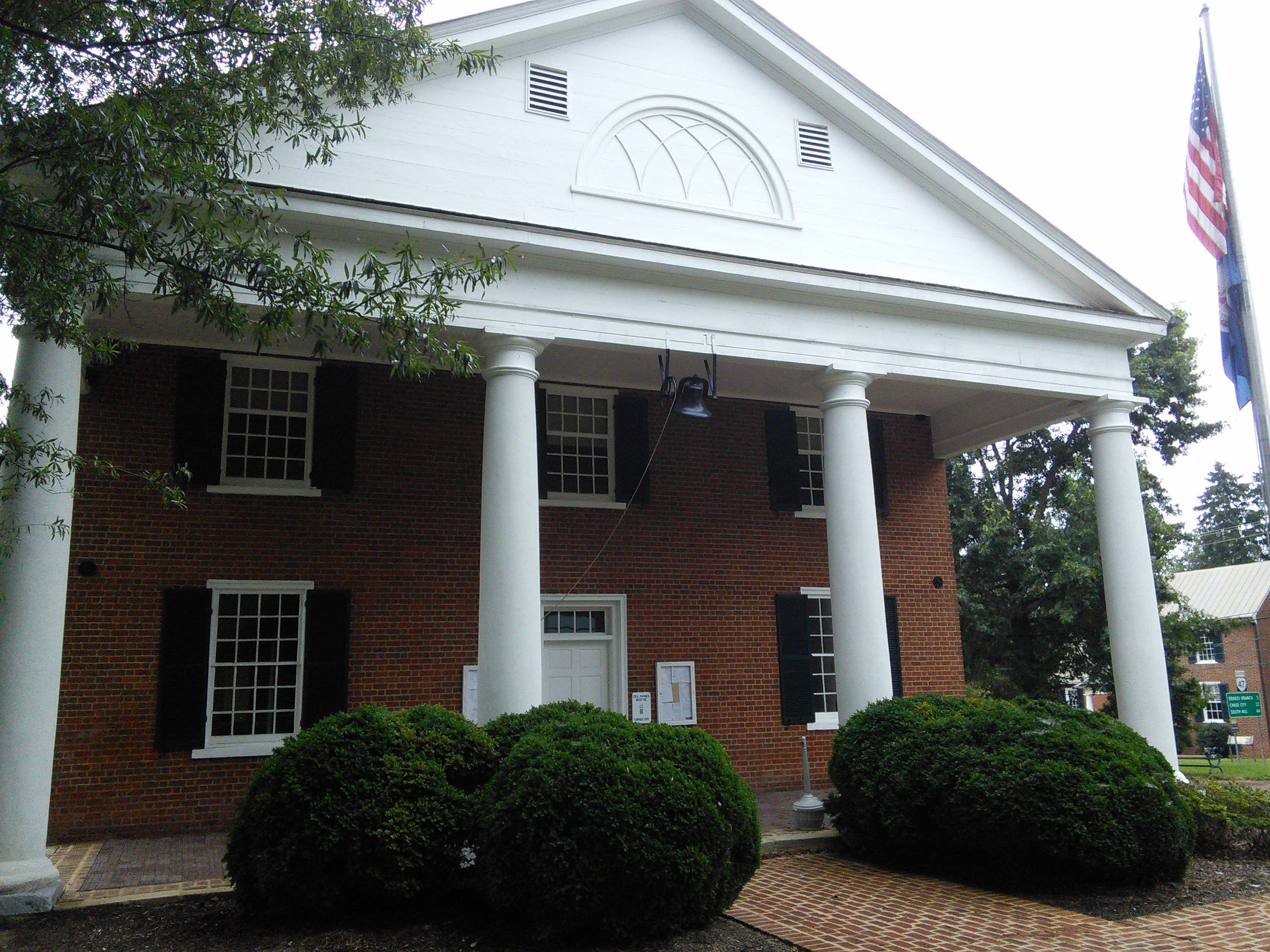
- Charlotte County Courthouse in September 2014

- Flag Seal

- Location within the U.S. state of Virginia
- Coordinates: 37°01′N 78°40′W
- Country: United States
- State: Virginia
- Founded: 1764
- Named for: Queen Charlotte
- Seat: Charlotte Court House
- Largest town: Keysville

Area
  - Total: 478 sq mi (1,240 km^{2})
  - Land: 475 sq mi (1,230 km^{2})
  - Water: 2.2 sq mi (5.7 km^{2}) 0.5%

Population (2020)
  - Total: 11,529
  - Estimate (2025): 11,401 ▼
  - Density: 24/sq mi (9.3/km^{2})
- Time zone: UTC−5 (Eastern)
  - Summer (DST): UTC−4 (EDT)
- Congressional district: 5th
- Website: https://www.charlottecountyva.gov/

Charlotte County is a county located in the south central part of the U.S. state of Virginia. Its county seat is the town of Charlotte Court House. As of the 2020 census, the county population was 11,529. Charlotte County is predominantly rural with a population density of only 26.5 persons per square mile.

The county was formed in 1764 from Lunenburg County, and it is named for Queen Charlotte, wife of King George III of England. Founding Father Patrick Henry was one of its most famous residents, and his grave and the national memorial dedicated to him are located in Charlotte County.

== History ==
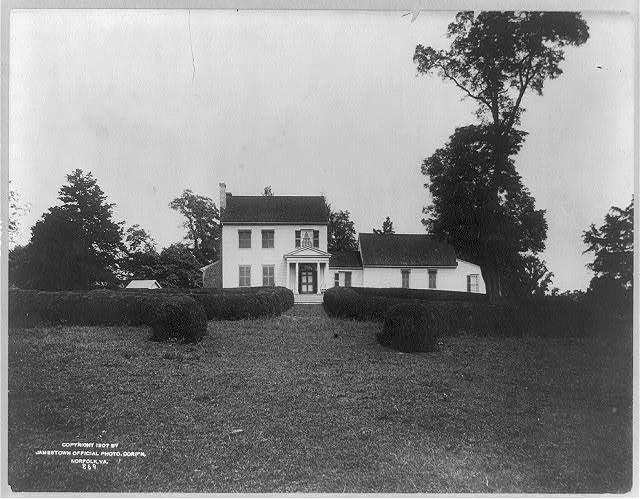
Red Hill Patrick Henry National Memorial in Charlotte County, the final resting place of Patrick Henry

European settlement of the future county began in the early 18th century, and early settlers included mostly English people, with some French Huguenots, Scotch-Irish, and a modest population of Germans. After approximately fifty years of European settlement, the House of Burgesses established and incorporated Charlotte County in 1764 from part of Lunenburg County. The new county was named in honor of Charlotte of Mecklenburg-Strelitz, the Queen and wife of King George III of Great Britain. The county residents later became staunch supporters of independence and the American Revolution and Founding Father Patrick Henry was one of its most famous residents. His grave and the national memorial dedicated to him are located in Charlotte County. Residents of Charlotte County were heavily involved in the American Revolution. County delegates supported resolutions against the Stamp Act of 1765, and the county government was the second governing body to declare independence from English rule. In addition, Charlotte militia units fought under General Robert Lawson during the Yorktown campaign, which effectively led to the end of the American War of Independence. Finally, the final resting place and national memorial to revolutionary hero Patrick Henry is at Red Hill Plantation.

Charlotte County has also played a role in other wars on American soil. An artillery company from Charlotte played a key role in the Battle of Craney Island during the War of 1812. Also, a significant battle in the American Civil War occurred in Charlotte and Halifax counties during the Battle of Staunton River Bridge, which resulted in a victory for the Confederacy.

== Geography ==
According to the U.S. Census Bureau, the county has a total area of 478 square miles (1,240 km^{2}), of which 475 square miles (1,230 km^{2}) is land and 2.2 square miles (5.7 km^{2}) (0.5%) is water. The county is bounded on the southwest by the Roanoke River, locally known as the "Staunton River". The terrain is hilly.

=== Adjacent counties ===
- Prince Edward County – north
- Lunenburg County – east
- Mecklenburg County – southeast
- Halifax County – southwest
- Campbell County – west
- Appomattox County – northwest

=== Major highways ===
- US 15 (Farmville Rd on the extreme northside of the county; joins US 360 in Keysville and separates in Wylliesburg
- US 360 (Kings Hwy)
- SR 40 (Lunenburg County Rd on the extreme eastside; Front St & Church St in Keysville; George Washington Hwy; joins SR 47 in Charlotte Court House and becomes David Bruce Ave; Patrick Henry Hwy)
- SR 47 (Thomas Jefferson Hwy; forks from SR 40 and becomes LeGrande Ave; Tollhouse Hwy; Drakes Main St in Drakes Branch; Craftons Gate Hwy
- SR 59 (Highway Fifty-Nine)
- SR 92 (Jeb Stuart Hwy)

== Demographics ==
Historical population
Census	Pop.	Note	%±
1790	10,078		—
1800	11,912		18.2%
1810	13,161		10.5%
1820	13,290		1.0%
1830	15,252		14.8%
1840	14,595		−4.3%
1850	13,955		−4.4%
1860	14,471		3.7%
1870	14,513		0.3%
1880	16,653		14.7%
1890	15,077		−9.5%
1900	15,343		1.8%
1910	15,785		2.9%
1920	17,540		11.1%
1930	16,061		−8.4%
1940	15,861		−1.2%
1950	14,057		−11.4%
1960	13,368		−4.9%
1970	11,551		−13.6%
1980	12,266		6.2%
1990	11,688		−4.7%
2000	12,472		6.7%
2010	12,586		0.9%
2020	11,529		−8.4%
2025 (est.)	11,401	▼	−1.1%
U.S. Decennial Census; 1790–1960 1900–90; 1990–2000 2010 2020 2025

=== Racial and ethnic composition ===
Charlotte County, Virginia – Racial and ethnic composition Note: the US Census treats Hispanic/Latino as an ethnic category. This table excludes Latinos from the racial categories and assigns them to a separate category. Hispanics/Latinos may be of any race.
Race / Ethnicity (NH = Non-Hispanic)	Pop 1980	Pop 1990	Pop 2000	Pop 2010	Pop 2020	% 1980	% 1990	% 2000	% 2010	% 2020
White alone (NH)	7,489	7,372	8,053	8,383	7,677	61.05%	63.07%	64.57%	66.61%	66.59%
Black or African American alone (NH)	4,646	4,258	4,087	3,739	3,140	37.88%	36.43%	32.77%	29.71%	27.24%
Native American or Alaska Native alone (NH)	5	18	17	31	18	0.04%	0.15%	0.14%	0.25%	0.16%
Asian alone (NH)	6	4	20	26	23	0.05%	0.03%	0.16%	0.21%	0.20%
Native Hawaiian or Pacific Islander alone (NH)	x	x	0	0	6	x	x	0.00%	0.00%	0.05%
Other race alone (NH)	2	3	21	14	35	0.02%	0.03%	0.17%	0.11%	0.30%
Mixed race or Multiracial (NH)	x	x	68	153	377	x	x	0.55%	1.22%	3.27%
Hispanic or Latino (any race)	118	33	206	240	253	0.96%	0.28%	1.65%	1.91%	2.19%
Total	12,266	11,688	12,472	12,586	11,529	100.00%	100.00%	100.00%	100.00%	100.00%

=== 2020 census ===
As of the 2020 United States census, the county had a population of 11,529.

The median age was 46.8 years. 20.8% of residents were under the age of 18 and 23.0% of residents were 65 years of age or older. For every 100 females there were 97.0 males, and for every 100 females age 18 and over there were 93.9 males age 18 and over.

0.0% of residents lived in urban areas, while 100.0% lived in rural areas.

There were 4,899 households in the county, of which 25.1% had children under the age of 18 living with them and 29.3% had a female householder with no spouse or partner present. About 31.9% of all households were made up of individuals and 16.3% had someone living alone who was 65 years of age or older.

There were 5,956 housing units, of which 17.7% were vacant. Among occupied housing units, 72.5% were owner-occupied and 27.5% were renter-occupied. The homeowner vacancy rate was 2.3% and the rental vacancy rate was 5.7%.

== Elected officials ==
=== Board of Supervisors ===
- Sherry Tharp (R), District A – Charlotte Court House, Chairman — Term expires 12/31/27
- John "Miller" Adams (I), District B - Wylliesburg/Red Oak — Term expires 12/31/29
- Noah Davis (I), District C – Drakes Branch— Term expires 12/31/27
- Adrienne Campbell (I), District D – Keysville — Term expires 12/31/29
- Henry Carwile, District E - Cullen/Red House — Term expires 12/31/27
- Walter T. Bailey, District F – Aspen/Phenix, Vice Chairman — Term expires 12/31/25
- Derek Toombes, District G-Bacon/Saxe— Term expires 12 /31/27

The Board of Supervisors is the legislative policy making body for the county. It considers and adopts policies regarding administration, budget, finance, economic development, health, planning, public safety, childcare, recreation, sanitation and waste removal. The Board appropriates funds for all functions, including the schools, Social Services, Law Enforcement and operation of courts. The Board's regularly scheduled meetings are held on the second Tuesday of each month at 1:30 pm in the Board of Supervisors Room of the County Administration Building, 250 LeGrande Avenue, Suite A, (PO Box 608) Charlotte Court House, Virginia, 23923.

=== Sheriff ===
Royal Freeman (I) is the sheriff. Freeman is responsible for overseeing criminal investigations, calls for service, court room security, service of civil process and the operation of the Charlotte County jail.

=== Circuit Court Clerk ===
The clerk is Annette Clowdis (I). Clowdis manages the records for the Judicial Circuit. In addition, Colley manages the records for the Judicial Circuit and serves as general record keeper for the county, recording all documents relating to land transfers, deeds, mortgages, wills, divorces and other statistics that date back to 1765.

=== Commissioner of Revenue ===
Naisha P. Carter (I) is the Commissioner of the Revenue. Carter maintains the county tax maps, assesses the amount of tax owed on property and prepares the real estate and personal property tax book for Charlotte County. Carter also serves as a Virginia DMV (Department of Motor Vehicles) Select Office which provides title and registration services, license plate sales, and other services.

=== Commonwealth's Attorney ===
William E. Green, Jr. (I) is the Commonwealth's Attorney. The Charlotte County Commonwealth Attorney represents the citizens of the County in the prosecution of violations of state and local laws & is responsible for the enforcement of criminal law within the county.

=== Treasurer ===
Patricia P. Berkeley (I) is the Treasurer. The Charlotte County Treasurer is responsible for the collection, custody and disbursement of all county funds. The Treasurer's Office is where taxes are paid and dog licenses are purchased.

=== Administration ===
- Daniel Witt, County Administrator
- Monica Elder, Assistant County Administrator
- Norma Tuck, Finance Director
- Heather Brown, Purchasing Agent/Office Assistant
- Vanessa Waddell, Administrative Assistant

The Charlotte County Administration Office is responsible for carrying out the day-to-day operations of the county in accordance with the policies of the Charlotte County Board of Supervisors. The Administration Office oversees the general operations of the county, personnel management, budget preparation, funds management, purchasing, economic development, property management, compliance with state and federal laws and regulations, planning, and zoning.

=== School Board ===
- Rick Brown-County Seat
- Carmalita Escoto, District A (Charlotte Court House)
- Teresa Dunaway, District B (Wylliesburg/Red Oak)
- Gloria Talbott, District C (Drakes Branch)
- R.B. "Jay" George (Vice Chairman), District D (Keysville)
- Scotty Hamlett, District E (Cullen/Red House)
- Dr. Elise A. Gree, District F (Phenix/Aspen)
- Lauren Willis, District B (Bacon/Saxe)
- Dana Ramsey, Clerk of the Board

=== Voter Registrar ===
Jenni P. Booth

== Politics ==
United States presidential election results for Charlotte County, Virginia
Year	Republican		Democratic		Third party(ies)	
Year	No.	%	No.	%	No.	%
1912	175	19.06%	609	66.34%	134	14.60%
1916	227	20.79%	856	78.39%	9	0.82%
1920	364	22.28%	1,266	77.48%	4	0.24%
1924	154	12.38%	1,006	80.87%	84	6.75%
1928	403	26.60%	1,112	73.40%	0	0.00%
1932	169	11.44%	1,300	88.02%	8	0.54%
1936	190	9.89%	1,727	89.85%	5	0.26%
1940	251	14.58%	1,467	85.24%	3	0.17%
1944	356	19.45%	1,473	80.49%	1	0.05%
1948	285	17.10%	964	57.83%	418	25.07%
1952	949	36.56%	1,630	62.79%	17	0.65%
1956	791	27.86%	1,431	50.41%	617	21.73%
1960	867	32.90%	1,735	65.84%	33	1.25%
1964	1,974	62.11%	1,191	37.48%	13	0.41%
1968	1,042	24.43%	1,045	24.50%	2,178	51.07%
1972	2,501	66.22%	1,182	31.29%	94	2.49%
1976	2,023	46.04%	2,312	52.62%	59	1.34%
1980	2,322	51.26%	2,108	46.53%	100	2.21%
1984	2,999	61.76%	1,811	37.29%	46	0.95%
1988	2,699	57.44%	1,923	40.92%	77	1.64%
1992	2,293	44.86%	2,098	41.05%	720	14.09%
1996	2,103	45.58%	2,007	43.50%	504	10.92%
2000	2,855	57.17%	2,017	40.39%	122	2.44%
2004	3,166	58.22%	2,223	40.88%	49	0.90%
2008	3,372	54.77%	2,705	43.93%	80	1.30%
2012	3,311	56.14%	2,503	42.44%	84	1.42%
2016	3,479	59.90%	2,155	37.10%	174	3.00%
2020	3,815	61.62%	2,317	37.43%	59	0.95%
2024	3,963	65.83%	2,008	33.36%	49	0.81%

== Communities ==
=== Towns ===
- Charlotte Court House
- Drakes Branch
- Keysville
- Phenix

=== Unincorporated ===
- Cullen
- Harrisburg
- Madisonville
- Randolph
- Red House
- Red Oak
- Wren
- Wylliesburg

== Notable people ==
- David K. E. Bruce – diplomat and politician
- Isaac Dabbs – politician
- Patrick Henry – politician and Founding Father
- William Hoffman- famous author
- John McCargo- former NFL player for the Buffalo Bills
- John Randolph – politician
- Joe Reed- NFL player for the Los Angeles Chargers
- A. Leo Weil – lawyer

== See also ==
- National Register of Historic Places listings in Charlotte County, Virginia
