= National Register of Historic Places listings in Vance County, North Carolina =

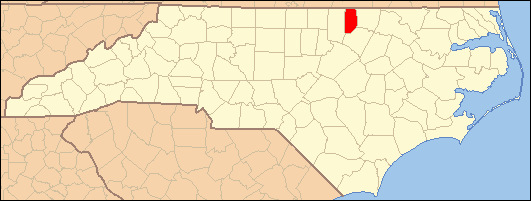

This list includes properties and districts listed on the National Register of Historic Places in Vance County, North Carolina. Click the "Map of all coordinates" link to the right to view an online map of all properties and districts with latitude and longitude coordinates in the table below.

== Current listings ==
This National Park Service list is complete through NPS recent listings posted March 14, 2025.

	Name on the Register	Image	Date listed	Location	City or town	Description
1	Ashburn Hall		August 16, 1977 (#77001009)	W of Kittrell on SR 1101; 36°12′19″N 78°30′09″W	Kittrell	
2	Ashland	Ashland	March 14, 1973 (#73001371)	N of Henderson on Satterwhite Point Rd. 36°25′55″N 78°22′09″W	Henderson	
3	Barker House		December 1, 2014 (#14000993)	1785 Barker Rd. 36°22′42″N 78°30′10″W	Henderson	
4	Belvidere		November 12, 1992 (#92001603)	NC 1329, NE end 36°28′14″N 78°23′05″W	Williamsboro	
5	Burnside Plantation House	Burnside Plantation House	April 16, 1971 (#71000621)	On SR 1335; 36°26′02″N 78°27′45″W	Williamsboro	
6	Thomas Capehart House	Thomas Capehart House	May 6, 1977 (#77001010)	W of Kittrell on SR 1105; 36°13′47″N 78°28′00″W	Kittrell	
7	Josiah Crudup House	Josiah Crudup House	September 25, 1979 (#79003342)	S of Kittrell on US 1; 36°11′17″N 78°26′59″W	Kittrell	
8	Henderson Central Business Historic District	Henderson Central Business Historic District	August 24, 1987 (#87001249)	Garnett St. from Church to Young Sts. 36°19′34″N 78°24′19″W	Henderson	
9	Henderson Fire Station and Municipal Building	Henderson Fire Station and Municipal Building	August 10, 1978 (#78001973)	Garnett and Young Sts. 36°19′40″N 78°24′08″W	Henderson	
10	LaGrange	LaGrange	April 27, 1982 (#82003519)	South of Townsville off SR 1308; 36°24′17″N 78°24′42″W	Harris Crossroads	
11	Library and Laboratory Building-Henderson Institute	Library and Laboratory Building-Henderson Institute	November 29, 1995 (#95001399)	629 W. Rock Spring St. 36°20′18″N 78°24′00″W	Henderson	
12	Machpelah		March 27, 2007 (#07000215)	12079 NC 39, approx. 0.5 mi (1 km). S of Townsville; 36°29′11″N 78°25′58″W	Townsville	
13	Mistletoe Villa	Mistletoe Villa	August 10, 1978 (#78001974)	Young Ave. 36°19′14″N 78°24′33″W	Henderson	
14	Thomas A. Morgan Farm		December 19, 2019 (#100004798)	1471, 1473 & 1475 Morgan Rd. 36°28′33″N 78°27′41″W	Townsville vicinity	
15	Maria Parham Hospital	Maria Parham Hospital	September 2, 1994 (#94001066)	406 S. Chestnut St. 36°19′37″N 78°24′30″W	Henderson	
16	Pleasant Hill/Hawkins House	Pleasant Hill/Hawkins House	March 19, 1979 (#79001758)	W of Middleburg on SR 1371; 36°24′02″N 78°20′34″W	Middleburg	Home of Philemon Hawkins II built in 1759
17	Pool Rock Plantation	Pool Rock Plantation	November 29, 1978 (#78001977)	NE of Williamsboro on SR 1380; 36°27′17″N 78°25′04″W	Williamsboro	
18	St. James Episcopal Church and Rectory	St. James Episcopal Church and Rectory	December 14, 1978 (#78001976)	Jct. of SR 1551 and SR 1555; 36°13′22″N 78°26′25″W	Kittrell	
19	St. John's Episcopal Church	St. John's Episcopal Church	April 16, 1971 (#71000622)	SR 1329; 36°25′46″N 78°26′03″W	Williamsboro	
20	Daniel Stone Plank House	Daniel Stone Plank House	July 12, 1984 (#84002531)	Address Restricted	Henderson	
21	Vance County Courthouse	Vance County Courthouse	May 10, 1979 (#79001757)	Young St. 36°19′43″N 78°24′08″W	Henderson	
22	West End School	West End School	February 2, 2005 (#04001585)	1000 S. Chestnut St. 36°19′24″N 78°24′48″W	Henderson	
23	Zollicoffer's Law Office	Zollicoffer's Law Office	June 13, 1978 (#78001975)	215 N. Garnett St. 36°19′41″N 78°24′06″W	Henderson	

== See also ==
- National Register of Historic Places listings in North Carolina
- List of National Historic Landmarks in North Carolina
