= Northern Vance High School =

Coordinates: 36.3504237°N 78.37333°W

Location
- 293 Warrenton Road; Henderson, North Carolina 27537; United States

Information
- Established: 1968
- Closed: 2018
- School district: Vance County Public Schools

Northern Vance High School was a high school located in Henderson, North Carolina, at 293 Warrenton Road. The school's mascot was a Viking, and its fight song was the "Notre Dame Victory March".

== History ==
In March 2018, Vance County Schools announced the consolidation of both high school campuses as a cost-cutting measure. The new school, Vance County High School, would be located at the former Southern Vance High campus. Following this consolidation, Northern Vance was repurposed as the site for Vance Middle School, which was created by merging two other middle schools in the area.

== Notable alumni ==
- Jason Brown — former NFL center
- Carlos Fields — former NFL linebacker
