= Vance County High School =

American public school in North America

Location
- 925 Garrett Road; Henderson, North Carolina 27537; United States; 36°18′10″N 78°22′26″W

Information
- School district: Vance County Public Schools
- CEEB code: 341755
- Principal: Dr. Nealie Whitt III
- Staff: 68.60 (FTE)
- Enrollment: 1,046 (2023–2024)
- Student to teacher ratio: 15.25
- Colors: Kelly green and black
- Mascot: Viper
- Website: vchs.vcs.k12.nc.us

Vance County High School (formerly Southern Vance High School) is a high school located at 925 Garrett Road in Henderson, North Carolina. The school's mascot is the Viper. The principal at VCHS is Dr. Nealie Whitt III.

The school is under the Title 1 policy.

== History ==
Southern Vance originally opened after Labor Day in 1990, following a split in the student population of the former Vance Senior High School by the school board in response to a growing population at the time. The original mascot was chosen by the 7th, 8th & 9th grade population of Henderson Junior High and the 10th grade class of Vance Senior High in Spring 1989. This particular segment of students was chosen as they would be the first classes to attend the new combined school. In addition, this same body selected the school colors—Light Blue / White / and Royal Blue Outline.

Problems with the school's floors soon materialized. By the end of the first school year, the floors had begun to show uneven spots throughout. Countless "bubbles" had risen throughout. Subsequent samples taken of the floor began a multi-year legal action against the contractor who had laid the floor.

Journalism at SVHS initially moved away from a traditional newspaper format. Instead, the school opted for a "Newsmagazine" format. Titled The Raider Review, the newsmagazine was different from the long-established "The Viking" at Northern Vance High.

Southern Vance was equipped with what was considered at the time a state-of-the art visual media center, including televisions in every room. In December 1991, Southern launched its morning newscast, dubbed "WSVH-TV 13 Raider News at 8:20".

In March 2018, Vance County Schools announced that it was consolidating both high school campuses into one location as a cost-cutting measure. The new school, Vance County High School, would be located at the former Southern Vance High campus. Northern Vance later became the home of Vance Middle School, itself a consolidation of two other middle schools in the area.

== Sports ==
Vance County High School competes in a variety of sports as the "Vipers". These sports include Football (JV and Varsity), Men's Soccer (JV and Varsity), Women's Tennis, Volleyball (JV and Varsity), Cheerleading (Fall and Winter), Women's Golf, Indoor Track & Field (Men's and Women's), Outdoor Track & Field (Men's and Women's), Cross Country (Men's and Women's), Swimming (Men's and Women's), Wrestling, Softball, Baseball, Women's Soccer, Men's Golf, Men's Tennis, Women's Basketball (JV and Varsity), and Men's Basketball (JV and Varsity). The men's and women's basketball teams were the 2019 Conference Champions, winning the school's first championships.

The Vipers originally competed in the Northern Carolina 1A/2A Conference, but have since joined the Big 8 3A Conference.

== Clubs ==
- National Honor Society (NHS)
- National Technical Honor Society (NTHS)
- National Beta Club
- Student Government Association (SGA)
- Yearbook
- Future Business Leaders of America (FBLA)

== Students ==
There are currently 1,033 students attending.

== Teachers ==
There are currently 70 full-time teachers.

== Electives ==
Vance County High School offers a Career and Technical Education (CTE) Internship class. This class offers 2 high school credits. One for completing the class and one for having an actual job.

Career and Technical Education (CTE) are monitored through the county school board and the North Carolina Department of Public Instruction (NCDPI).
