= Carlos Fields =

American football player and coach (born 1990)

Carlos Fields Jr.
Virginia State Trojans
- Title: Defensive coordinator & linebackers coach

Personal information
- Born: October 3, 1990 (age 36); Henderson, North Carolina, U.S.
- Listed height: 6 ft 1 in (1.85 m)
- Listed weight: 248 lb (112 kg)

Career information
- High school: Northern Vance (Henderson, North Carolina)
- College: Winston-Salem State (2010–2013)
- NFL draft: 2014: undrafted

Career history

Playing
- Oakland Raiders (2014)*; Tampa Bay Buccaneers (2014)*; New York Giants (2014)*; Indianapolis Colts (2014–2015)*; Washington Redskins (2015); Buffalo Bills (2016)*; Washington Redskins (2016)*; San Diego Chargers (2016); Philadelphia Eagles (2017)*
- * Offseason or practice squad member only

Coaching
- Winston-Salem State (2018) Defensive assistant & assistant defensive quality control coach; Thomasville HS (NC) (2019–2020) Assistant defensive coordinator, special teams coordinator, & junior varsity linebackers coach; Alabama A&M (2021) Assistant defensive line coach & linebackers coach; Virginia State (2022–present) Defensive coordinator & linebackers coach

Career NFL statistics
- Total tackles: 4
- Stats at Pro Football Reference

Carlos Fields Jr. (born October 3, 1990) is an American college football coach and former linebacker. He is the defensive coordinator and linebackers coach for Virginia State University, positions he has held since 2022. He played college football for Winston-Salem State. After going undrafted in the 2014 NFL draft he signed with the Oakland Raiders of the National Football League (NFL). He also played for the Tampa Bay Buccaneers, New York Giants, Indianapolis Colts, Washington Redskins, Los Angeles Chargers, and Philadelphia Eagles.

Fields Jr. started his coaching career at his alma mater before moving to Thomasville High School and Alabama A&M.

== Professional career ==
=== Oakland Raiders ===
After going undrafted in the 2014 NFL draft, Fields signed with the Oakland Raiders on May 16, 2014. He was waived on August 30.

=== Tampa Bay Buccaneers ===
On September 1, 2014, Fields signed to the practice squad of the Tampa Bay Buccaneers. He was released on September 30.

=== New York Giants ===
Fields signed to the New York Giants' practice squad on October 15, 2014. He was released on October 28.

=== Indianapolis Colts ===
The Indianapolis Colts signed Fields to their practice squad on October 29, 2014. Fields signed a futures contract on January 19, 2015. He was waived on September 5.

=== Washington Redskins (first stint) ===
The Washington Redskins signed Fields to their practice squad on November 9, 2015. On December 5, 2015, the Washington Redskins activated Fields to their 53-man roster.

The team waived Fields on September 3, 2016.

=== Buffalo Bills ===
On September 6, 2016, Fields was signed to the Buffalo Bills' practice squad. He was released on September 27, 2016.

=== Washington Redskins (second stint) ===
On October 19, 2016, Fields signed to the Washington Redskins practice squad. He was released on November 15, 2016.

=== San Diego / Los Angeles Chargers ===
On November 21, 2016, Fields was signed to the Chargers' practice squad. He was promoted to the active roster on December 31, 2016. On May 16, 2017, he was released by the Chargers.

=== Philadelphia Eagles ===
On August 30, 2017, Fields signed with the Philadelphia Eagles, only to be waived two days later.
