= Memucan Hunt =

American politician (1729–1808)

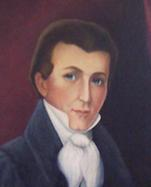
- ca. 1759 by Charles Willson Peale, Philadelphia artist, from oil paintings on wood. State Archives of North Carolina
- Born: August 23, 1729; Colony of Virginia, British America
- Died: September 1808 (aged 79); Granville County, North Carolina, U.S.
- Occupations: Politician, planter
- Known for: N.C. Senator, First Treasurer of North Carolina
- Spouse: Mary "Polly" Wade (m. March 19, 1754)
- Children: 10, including Cpt. John Richard Hunt, I, Col. William Hunt, and Dr. Thomas Galatin Hunt, Sr.
- Relatives: Memucan Hunt, Jr. (grandson)

Memucan Hunt (1729–1808) was an early American statesman, planter, and the first person to hold the position of North Carolina State Treasurer in its current form.

== Biography ==
Memucan Hunt was born in Virginia Colony on August 23, 1729. From ca. 1760 he lived at Burnside Plantation House, a two-story, weatherboarded, Federal style dwelling near Williamsboro, North Carolina. He owned nearly 16,000 acres (6,500 ha) of land, and considerable assets including 22 slaves, and property in Tennessee.

In 1770, at the age of 41, Hunt was appointed Sergeant-at-Arms of the Province of North Carolina House of Burgesses, and in 1773 was elected as a Representative to the Assembly from Granville and Bute Counties. He co-authored multiple pieces of legislation.

When the spirit of independence began to rise in the colony, Hunt represented Granville County in the five Provincial Congresses. In 1777, with the War for Independence underway, the fiscal needs of the colony were among its greatest concerns. Hunt was appointed Treasurer of the Hillsborough district, one of six district treasurers in the State at that time. He continued to hold office in the North Carolina General Assembly, and in 1779 was elected to the State Senate, serving as a member of the Committee of Accounts.

In November 1783, the General Assembly, in session at New Bern, abolished the district treasurer offices and established the singular fiscal position of State Treasurer and elected Hunt to fill the post. He took office on January 1, 1784, at a salary of 500 pounds per year. During his term in office, he unwittingly honored fraudulent claims for military service stemming from the Revolutionary War (paying too generously soldiers who had fought in the Revolutionary War, and in some cases, paying soldiers who had not fought at all). While he was never charged, he was defeated for re-election in 1787 by John Haywood.

Hunt retired from politics to Granville County, where he resided at home with his family, became a wealthy planter, and served as Justice of the Peace until 1792. He died at home in North Carolina in September 1808. He married Mary ("Polly") Wade, a relative of General Wade Hampton, on March 19, 1754 and together had ten children.

== Legacy ==
His grandson, Memucan Hunt, Jr., was the namesake for Hunt County, Texas.
