= Dabney, North Carolina =

- Unincorporated community
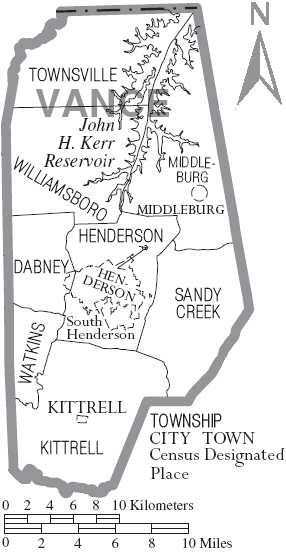
- Vance County Townships

- Location within North Carolina Location within the United States
- Coordinates: 36°21′11″N 78°29′51″W
- Country: United States
- State: North Carolina
- County: Vance
- Elevation: 548 ft (167 m)
- Time zone: UTC-5 (Eastern (EST))
  - Summer (DST): UTC-4 (EDT)
- Area code: 252
- GNIS feature ID: 983910

Dabney is an unincorporated community in Vance County, North Carolina, United States. Dabney is 5.5 miles (8.9 km) west-northwest of Henderson. There was a post office in Dabney from December 3, 1883 to March 15, 1935. The first postmaster was John Eaton Burroughs. Dabney is in the Township of Dabney.
