= Linthicum & Linthicum =

American architectural firm

Linthicum & Linthicum was an architectural firm in North Carolina. It was a partnership of Hill Carter Linthicum (1860–1919) who was a prolific architect, and H. Colvin Linthicum, his son.

Hill Carter Linthicum's father was the contractor William H. Linthicum, who worked with Thomas Linthicum in a contracting firm started in Danville, Virginia in 1850. The contracting firm built in Virginia, Maryland, and especially in tobacco-prosperous Durham, North Carolina where they built "such key buildings as the W. Duke & Sons Company Cigarette Factory (1884); the E. J. Parrish Warehouse (1887); store buildings for M.C. Herndon, W.T. Blackwell, and Slater and Halliberton; and the Durham Baptist Church (1887)." One or more of these works are in what is now Bright Leaf Historic District, a historic district in Durham, North Carolina that is listed on the National Register of Historic Places.

Hill Carter was born in Virginia and was educated at Danville Military Academy.

A number of works of Hill Carter Linthicum and his son are listed on the U.S. National Register of Historic Places.

Works include:

- Boylan Apartments, 817 Hillsborough St., Raleigh, North Carolina (Linthicum & Linthicum), NRHP-listed
- One or more works in Mordecai Place Historic District, roughly bounded by N. Blount St., Courtland Dr., Old Wake Forest Rd. and Mordecai Dr., Raleigh, North Carolina (Rose and Linthicum, et al.), NRHP-listed
- Maria Parham Hospital, 406 S. Chestnut St., Henderson, North Carolina (Linthicum and Linthicum), NRHP-listed
- Red House Presbyterian Church, 13409 NC 119 N, Semora, North Carolina (Linthicum, Hill Carter), NRHP-listed
- One or more works in Troy Residential Historic District, E side of N. Main St., from one lot N of Chestnut St. to one lot N of Blair St. and 105 Blair St., Troy, North Carolina (Linthicum, Hill Carter), NRHP-listed

== See also ==
- Murphey School, 3729 Murphy School Rd., Hillsborough, North Carolina (Linthicum, Henri C.), NRHP-listed
