= St. John's Episcopal Church (Williamsboro, North Carolina) =

Historic church in North Carolina, United States

- U.S. National Register of Historic Places
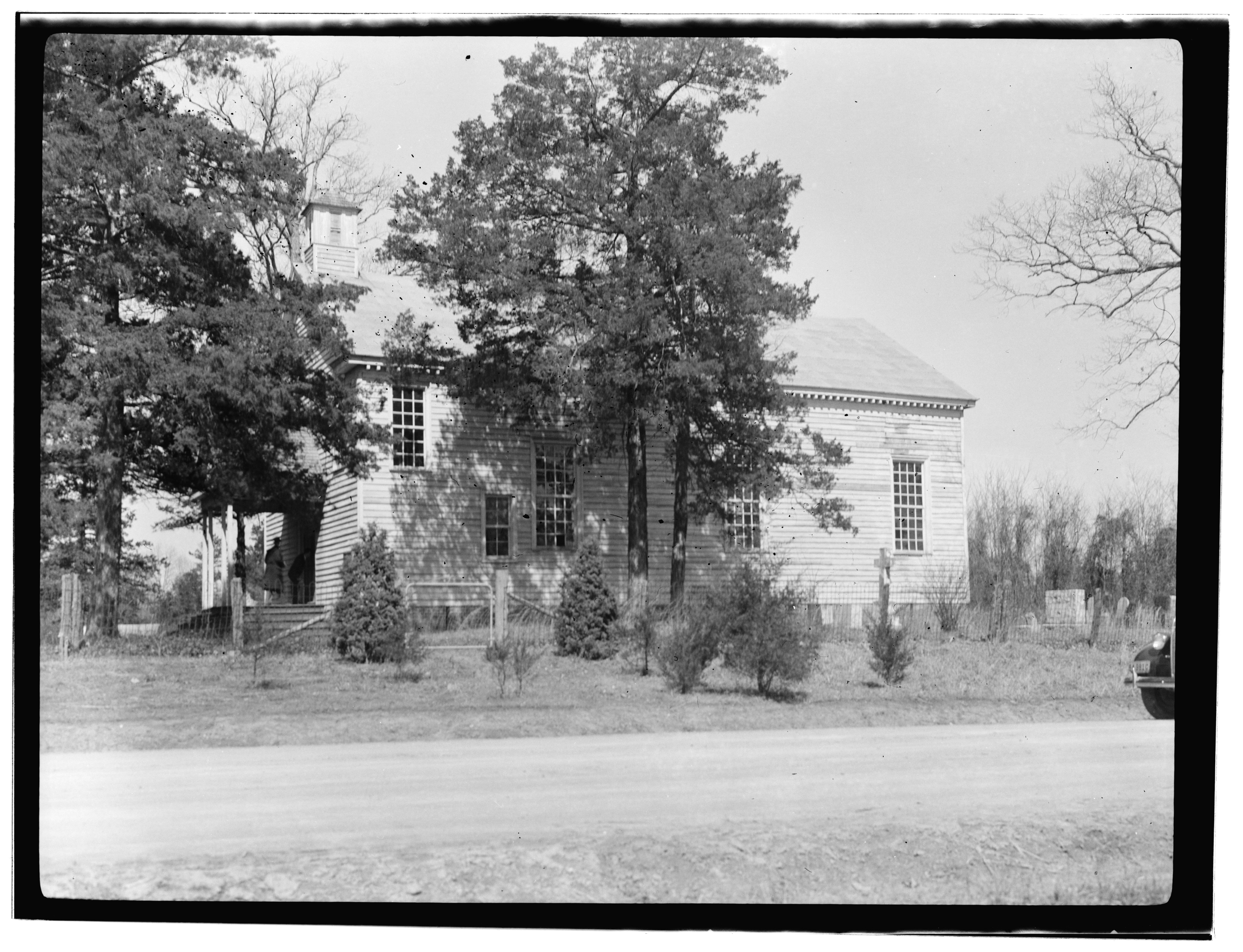
- St. John's Episcopal Church, HABS photo

- Location within North Carolina Location within the United States
- Location: SR 1329, Williamsboro, North Carolina
- Coordinates: 36°25′46″N 78°26′03″W
- Area: 1 acre (0.40 ha)
- Built: 1773
- Architect: Lynch, John
- Architectural style: Colonial
- NRHP reference No.: 71000622
- Added to NRHP: April 16, 1971

St. John's Episcopal Church is a historic Episcopal church located on SR 1329 in Williamsboro, Vance County, North Carolina. It was built in 1773, and is a rectangular, seven bay long, frame church on a brick foundation. It has a gable roof and is sheathed in weatherboard. The church was restored in the 1950s.

It was added to the National Register of Historic Places in 1971.
