= Vance County Courthouse =

Historic courthouse in North Carolina, US

- U.S. National Register of Historic Places
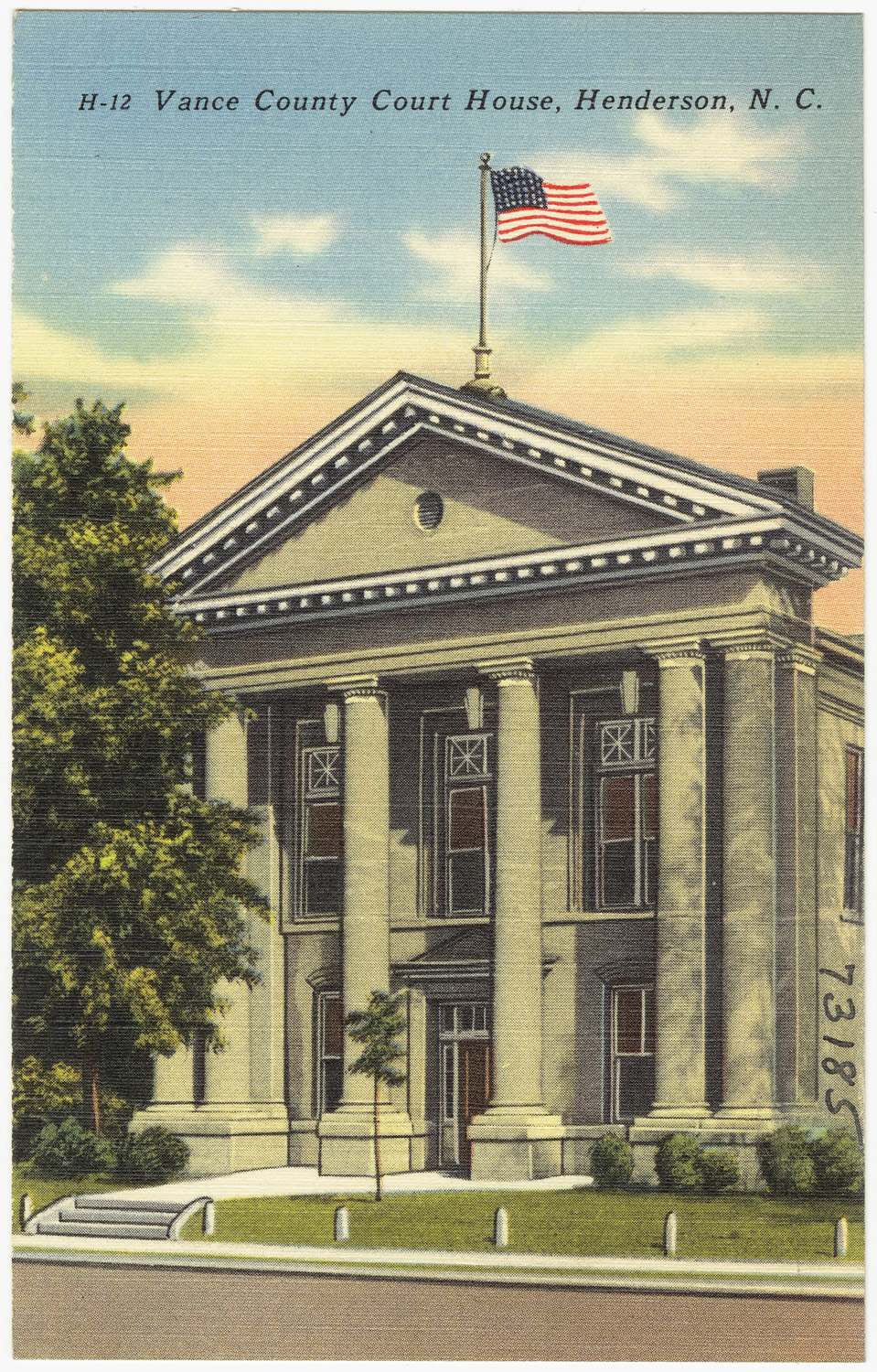

- Location within North Carolina Location within the United States
- Location: 122 Young St., Henderson, North Carolina
- Coordinates: 36.3286°N 78.4022°W
- Area: less than one acre
- Built: 1884, 1908
- Architect: James R. Thrower; Milburn, Heister & Company
- MPS: North Carolina County Courthouses TR
- NRHP reference No.: 79001757
- Added to NRHP: May 10, 1979

The former Vance County Courthouse is a historic courthouse building located at Henderson, Vance County, North Carolina, United States. It was originally built in 1884, before it was extensively remodeled in 1908 by Milburn, Heister & Company in the Neoclassical style. It is a two-story, tan brick, cross-plan building with a monumental front portico supported by brick columns.

It was listed on the National Register of Historic Places in 1979. It is located in the Henderson Central Business Historic District.
