= Daniel Stone Plank House =

Historic house in North Carolina, United States

- U.S. National Register of Historic Places
- Nearest city: Henderson, North Carolina
- Area: less than one acre
- Built: c. 1885
- NRHP reference No.: 84002531
- Added to NRHP: July 12, 1984

Daniel Stone Plank House was a historic home located near Henderson, Vance County, North Carolina. It dated to the late-18th or early-19th century, and was a two-story, sawn plank farm house. It was built and altered in at least three periods, and measured 22 feet long by 23 feet deep. It was moved to its listing site about 1885, and featured a gable roof projecting over the vertical plane of the walls on all four elevations. It has been demolished.

It was listed on the National Register of Historic Places in 1984.
