= Josiah Crudup House =

Historic house in North Carolina, United States

- U.S. National Register of Historic Places
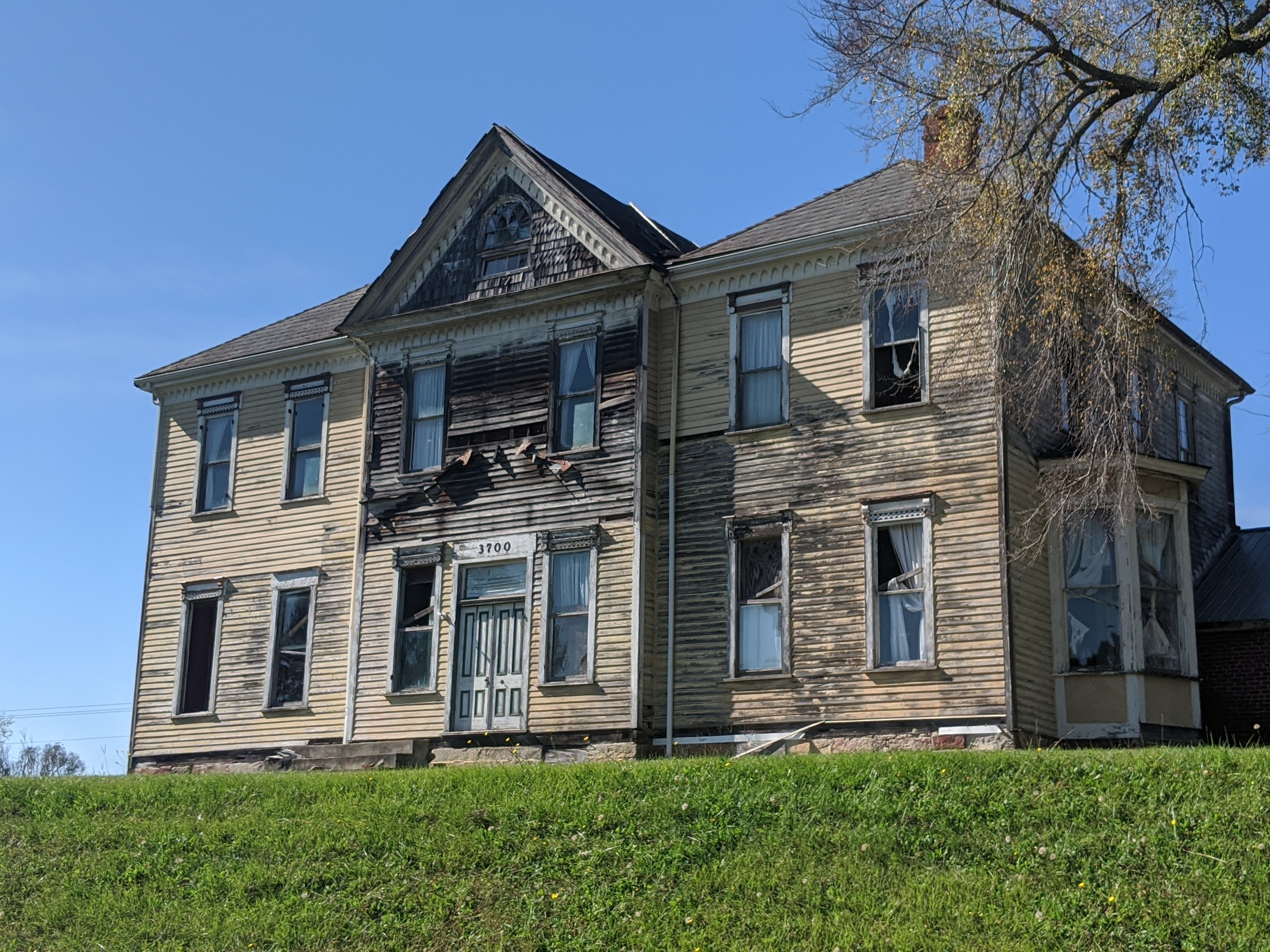

- Location within North Carolina Location within the United States
- Location: S of Kittrell on US 1, near Kittrell, North Carolina
- Coordinates: 36°11′17″N 78°26′59″W
- Area: less than one acre
- Built: c. 1833-1837
- Architectural style: Federal
- NRHP reference No.: 79003342
- Added to NRHP: September 25, 1979

Josiah Crudup House is a historic home located near Kittrell, Vance County, North Carolina. It was built between 1833 and 1837, purchased by Josiah Crudup around 1835, and was originally a version of the tripartite Federal style composition and consisted of a two-story, three-bay, central section with one-story flanking wings. It was later enlarged and modified to its present form as a two-story central portion, topped by a steep pediment, and flanking two-story sections each with rather steep hip roofs. The house contained the first residential elevator in North Carolina.

It was listed on the National Register of Historic Places in 1979.
