= Barker House (Vance County, North Carolina) =

Historic house in North Carolina, United States

- U.S. National Register of Historic Places
- Location within North Carolina Location within the United States
- Location: 1785 Barker Rd., near Henderson, North Carolina
- Coordinates: 36°22′42″N 78°30′10″W
- Area: 30 acres (12 ha)
- Built: c. 1764, c. 1774
- Architectural style: Hall-parlor plan, heavy-timber frame house
- NRHP reference No.: 14000993
- Added to NRHP: December 1, 2014

Barker House is a historic home located near Henderson, Vance County, North Carolina. It was built about 1764, with an addition built about 1774. It is a 1 1/2-story, five-bay, single pile, heavy timber frame dwelling. The interior has a hall-parlor plan. It was renovated in 2014, with a rebuilt full-width engaged front porch.

It was listed on the National Register of Historic Places in 2014.
