= Machpelah (Townsville, North Carolina) =

Historic farm in North Carolina, United States

- U.S. National Register of Historic Places
- Location within North Carolina Location within the United States
- Location: 12079 NC 39, approx. 0.5 mi (1 km). S of Townsville, near Townsville, North Carolina
- Coordinates: 36°29′11″N 78°25′58″W
- Area: 323 acres (131 ha)
- Built: c. 1850, c. 1880
- Built by: Willie Newkirk
- Architectural style: Greek Revival, Queen Anne, et al.
- NRHP reference No.: 07000215
- Added to NRHP: March 27, 2007

Machpelah, also known as Macpelah, McPelah, and the Robert B. Taylor Farm, is a historic home and farm located near Townsville, Vance County, North Carolina. The Edward O. Taylor House was built about 1880, and is a two-story, T-shaped, vernacular frame dwelling with Greek Revival, Queen Anne, and Colonial Revival details. Also on the property are the contributing single-story, timber-frame Greek Revival plantation office building (c. 1850, c. 1900); oil house (c. 1900); well (c. 1900, c. 1950); salting house and dovecote; privy (c. 1900); henhouse (c. 1900); flower pit (c. 1920); 1 1/2-story modest Colonial Revival style guesthouse (1954); five tenant houses (c. 1890, c. 1910, c. 1920); feed house (c. 1900); two stables (c. 1900, c. 1950); corn crib (c. 1900); two cemeteries; and the farm landscape.

It was listed on the National Register of Historic Places in 2007.
