= Ashland (Henderson, North Carolina) =

Historic house in North Carolina, United States

- U.S. National Register of Historic Places
- Drawing of Ashland from the Historic American Buildings Survey

- Location within North Carolina Location within the United States
- Location: 5533 Satterwhite Point Rd Henderson, NC 27537
- Coordinates: 36°25′55″N 78°22′09″W
- Area: 10 acres (4.0 ha)
- Built: c. 1744
- Architectural style: Greek Revival, Federal
- NRHP reference No.: 73001371
- Added to NRHP: March 14, 1973

Ashland is a historic plantation house located near Henderson, Vance County, North Carolina. It consists of two sections dated to the late-18th and mid-19th centuries. The older section is a two-story, two-bay, frame section attached to the newer and taller two-story, three-bay frame section. Each section is sheathed in weatherboard and topped by gable roofs. The house displays elements of Federal and Greek Revival style architecture. Judge Richard Henderson (1734–1785) owned the Ashland tract among his vast holdings.

The house was built c. 1740 by Samuel Henderson, father of Richard Henderson It was listed on the National Register of Historic Places in 1973.
