= Thomas Capehart House =

Historic house in North Carolina, United States

- U.S. National Register of Historic Places
- Location within North Carolina Location within the United States
- Location: W of Kittrell on SR 1105, near Kittrell, North Carolina
- Coordinates: 36°13′47″N 78°28′00″W
- Area: 8 acres (3.2 ha)
- Built: 1866-1870
- Architectural style: Gothic Revival, Downingesque Gothic
- NRHP reference No.: 77001010
- Added to NRHP: May 6, 1977

Thomas Capehart House is a historic home located near Kittrell, Vance County, North Carolina. It was built between 1866 and 1870, and is a small two-story, L-shaped frame board-and-batten, dwelling in the Downingesque Gothic style. It features ornate bargeboards, sawn ornament, and traceried windows. Also on the property is a contributing small outbuilding, also of board-and-batten.

It was listed on the National Register of Historic Places in 1977.
