= Jason Brown (American football) =

American football player (born 1983)

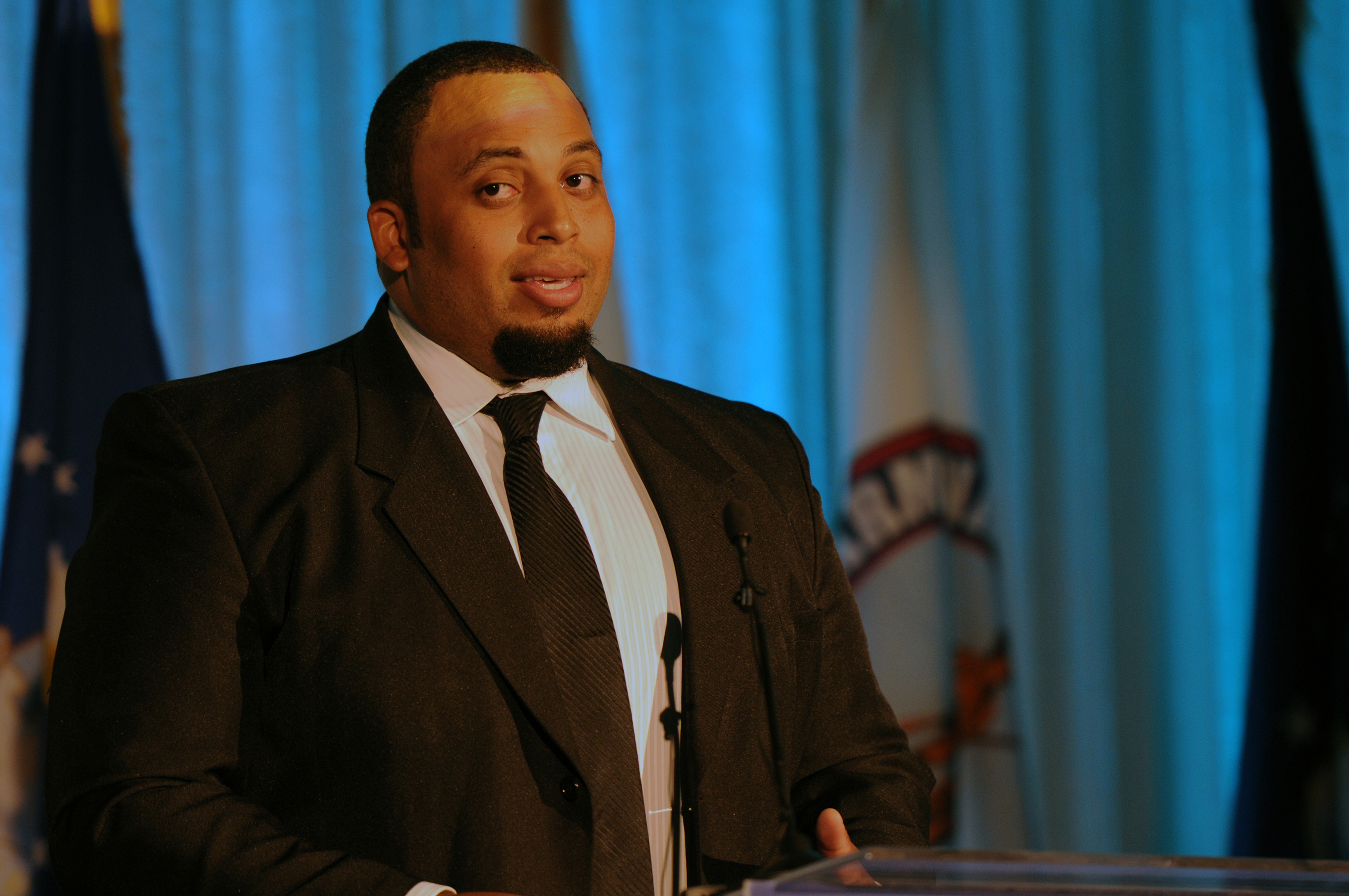
- Brown in 2015

No. 60
- Position: Center

Personal information
- Born: May 5, 1983 (age 43); Henderson, North Carolina, U.S.
- Listed height: 6 ft 3 in (1.91 m)
- Listed weight: 320 lb (145 kg)

Career information
- High school: Northern Vance (Henderson, North Carolina)
- College: North Carolina (2001–2004)
- NFL draft: 2005: 4th round, 124th overall pick

Career history
- Baltimore Ravens (2005–2008); St. Louis Rams (2009–2011)

Awards and highlights
- First-team All-ACC (2004)

Career NFL statistics
- Games played: 100
- Games started: 91
- Stats at Pro Football Reference

Jason W. Brown (born May 5, 1983) is an American former professional football center and farmer. He played college football at North Carolina and was selected by the Baltimore Ravens in the fourth round of the 2005 NFL draft. Brown also played for the St. Louis Rams.

== Early life ==
Brown was born and raised in Henderson, North Carolina. He attended Northern Vance High School, where he was a member of the National Honor Society. Brown was a member of the marching band until the football coach recruited him to play football. Brown was a standout not only in football but also in track and field. Brown holds four state championships, three in discus and one for shot put.

== College career ==
Brown started his career at North Carolina as a tackle, then guard. Brown first saw action in his freshman year at right tackle against Florida State. He was later moved to center, where he played the remaining three years of his college career. Brown did not miss a game during his career, and was named First-team All-ACC in 2004.

== Professional career ==
=== 2005 NFL draft ===
Along with Chris Spencer, Brown was considered one of the best centers available in the 2005 NFL draft. He was projected as a mid-third-round pick, and was eventually selected in the fourth round (124th overall) by the Baltimore Ravens.

Pre-draft measurables
Height	Weight	Arm length	Hand span	40-yard dash	10-yard split	20-yard split	20-yard shuttle	Three-cone drill	Vertical jump	Broad jump	Bench press
6 ft 2 3/4 in (1.90 m)	313 lb (142 kg)	32 1/2 in (0.83 m)	10 3/8 in (0.26 m)	5.40 s	1.85 s	3.09 s	4.52 s	7.72 s	30.5 in (0.77 m)	8 ft 9 in (2.67 m)	26 reps
All values from NFL Combine/North Carolina's Pro Day

=== Baltimore Ravens ===
Brown started all 16 games at guard in the 2007 season after spending 2005 and 2006 as a backup to Ravens starter Mike Flynn. He later started all 16 games in the 2008 season as a center. Brown was considered the best interior offensive lineman going into free agency after the end of season.

=== St. Louis Rams ===
Brown visited the St. Louis Rams his first day of free agency February 27, 2009. The next day, he agreed to a five-year deal worth $37.5 million, including a $20 million in guaranteed money. The deal would make Brown the highest paid center in the NFL. However, on March 10, it was reported that the contract had been disapproved by the league and the two sides were working to correct the issue. The deal was finally approved by the NFL on March 12.

On March 12, 2012, Brown was released by the Rams.

=== Free agency ===
Brown became an unrestricted free agent and received a conservative one-year contract offer from the Baltimore Ravens and attended visits with the San Francisco 49ers and Carolina Panthers.

== After football ==
After being released in 2012 at the age of 29, Brown became a farmer in Louisburg, North Carolina. He maintains a 1,000-acre farm called First Fruits Farm where he grows produce such as sweet potatoes and cucumbers. Brown donates these crops to local food pantries, having given away over 500,000 pounds of sweet potatoes and 50,000 pounds of cucumbers. He began learning about farming practices in 2012 by watching YouTube videos.

Brown also owns and manages a special events venue called Amazing Graze Barn, which is located on the grounds of First Fruits Farm. The barn is available for hosting weddings as well as corporate events and community gatherings.

== Personal life ==
Brown, who is African American, is a practicing Christian. His grandfather was civil rights activist and farmer Jasper Brown.

Brown's brother, Lunsford Bernard "Deucey" Brown II, worked in military intelligence for the United States Army and was killed by a mortar on September 20, 2003 during the Iraq War.

Jason and Tay Brown married in 2003 and have eight children.
