= Townsville, North Carolina =

Unincorporated community in North Carolina, US

Coordinates: 36°29′41″N 78°25′25″W

Townsville (formerly Townesville) is an unincorporated community in Townsville Township in northern Vance County, North Carolina, United States. It is located at the intersection of N.C. Highway 39 and Tungsten Mine Road (SR 1348), 13 miles (21 km) north of Henderson, at an elevation of 427 feet (130 m). Townesville was established in about 1821 and was part of Granville County until 1881 when Vance County was created. Townsville is near the John H. Kerr Reservoir and Virginia state line.

== History ==
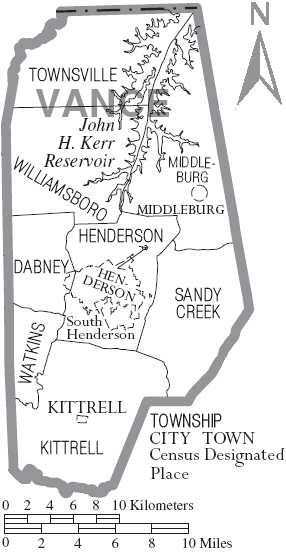

Townesville was established in about 1821 in Granville County. It was formerly known as Lynesville before 1851. William D. Hughes was the first postmaster of Townesville in Granville County on April 5, 1855. A post office was established in Townesville on February 19, 1874, with Moses J. Bullock as postmaster. The town name was changed to Townsville in 1892. The United States Post Office in Townsville has a ZIP Code of 27584.

After Vance County was established in 1881 and by requirements of the Constitution of North Carolina of 1868, counties were to be divided into townships, which were solely administrative divisions of the county. One of these townships is Townsville Township, which includes the unincorporated community of Townsville.

Historic sites in Townsville:

- Machpelah was listed on the National Register of Historic Places in 2007. It is a historic home and farm built in about 1880.

== Population ==
Townsville Township had a population of 1,489 in 1910, 1,597 in 1920, 1,680 in 1930, and 1,675 in 1940 according to U.S. Census records.
