= Belvidere (Williamsboro, North Carolina) =

Historic house in North Carolina, United States

- U.S. National Register of Historic Places
- Location within North Carolina Location within the United States
- Location: NC 1329, NE end, near Williamsboro, North Carolina
- Coordinates: 36°28′14″N 78°23′05″W
- Area: 15.8 acres (6.4 ha)
- Built: 1850
- Architect: Jacob W. Holt
- Architectural style: Greek Revival, Italianate
- NRHP reference No.: 92001603
- Added to NRHP: November 12, 1992

Belvidere, also known as the Boyd House, is a historic plantation house located near Williamsboro, Vance County, North Carolina. It is attributed to architect Jacob W. Holt and built about 1850. It is a two-story, double-pile frame Greek Revival / Italianate style frame dwelling. It has a high hipped roof with bracketed eaves. The front facade features a full-width porch with hipped roof and brackets. Also on the property is a contributing one-story, heavy timber-frame school house (c. 1850).

It was listed on the National Register of Historic Places in 1992.
