= Red House Presbyterian Church =

Historic church in North Carolina, United States

- U.S. National Register of Historic Places
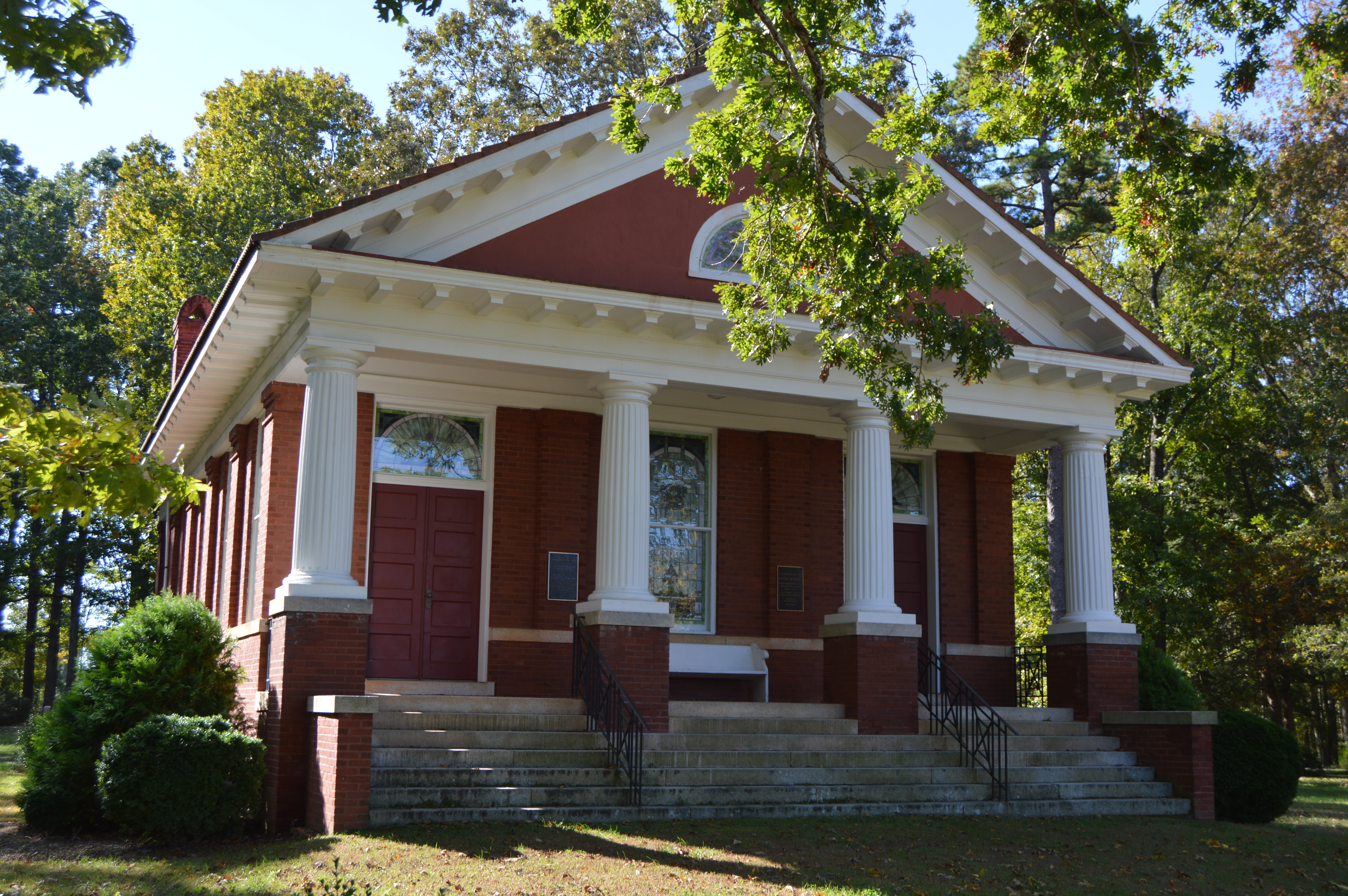
- Front and eastern side of the church

- Location within North Carolina Location within the United States
- Location: 13409 NC 119 N, Semora, North Carolina
- Coordinates: 36°29′15″N 79°9′46″W
- Area: 8.5 acres (3.4 ha)
- Built: 1781
- Built by: Henry Fields
- Architect: Hill Carter Linthicum
- Architectural style: Classical Revival
- NRHP reference No.: 07000413
- Added to NRHP: May 1, 2007

Red House Presbyterian Church, also known as Hugh McAden Gravesite or Red House Church, is a historic Presbyterian church and cemetery located at 13409 NC 119 N in Semora, Caswell County, North Carolina. The Classical Revival red brick church building was constructed in 1913. It features a portico with four round, fluted wooden Doric order columns. Also on the property is a contributing church cemetery.

The church was added to the National Register of Historic Places in 2007.
