= St. James Episcopal Church and Rectory (Kittrell, North Carolina) =

Historic church in North Carolina, United States

- U.S. National Register of Historic Places
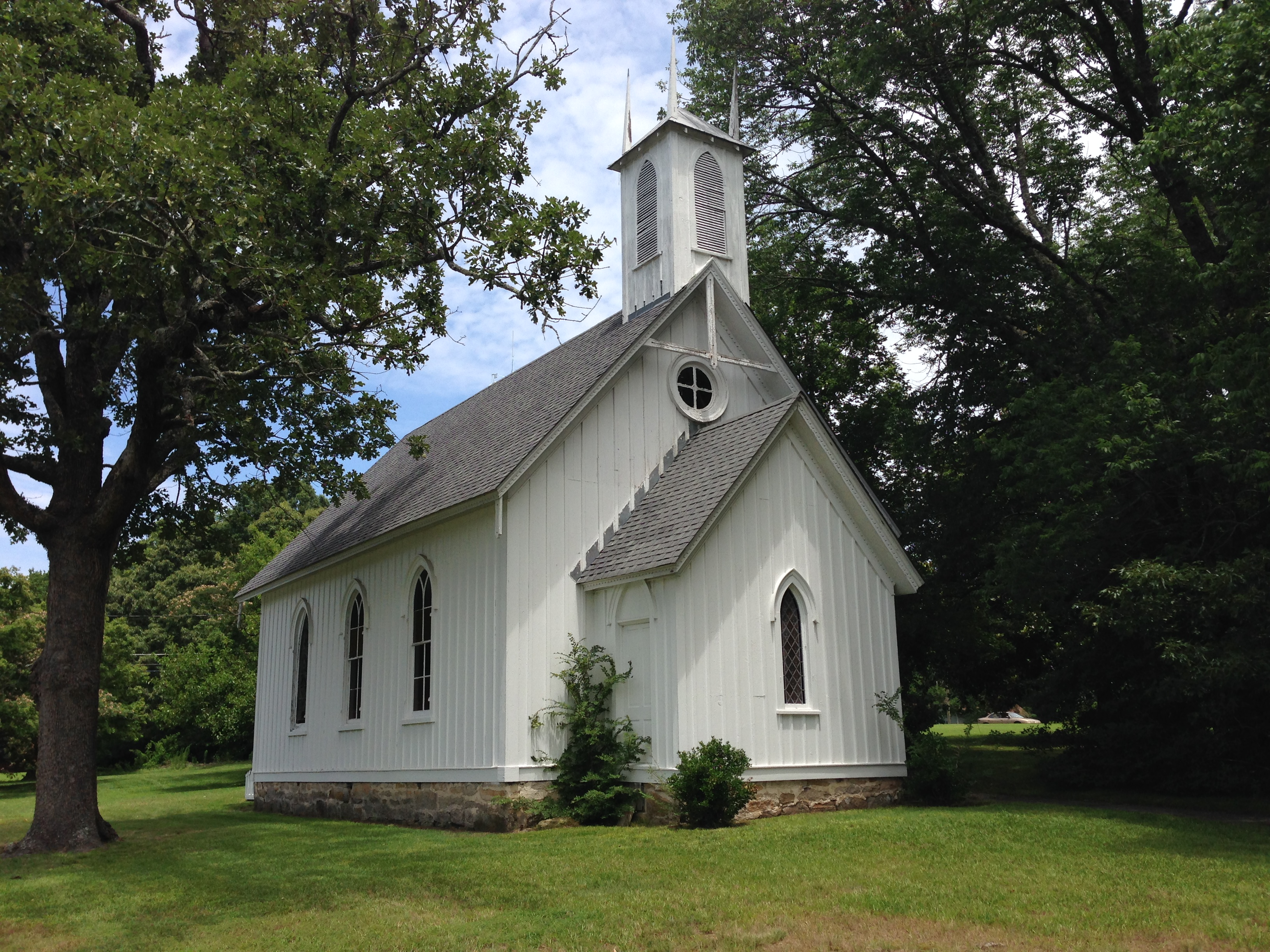

- Location within North Carolina Location within the United States
- Location: Jct. of SR 1551 and SR 1555, Kittrell, North Carolina
- Coordinates: 36°13′22″N 78°26′25″W
- Area: less than one acre
- Built: 1872; consecrated 1878
- Architectural style: Carpenter Gothic
- NRHP reference No.: 78001976
- Added to NRHP: December 14, 1978

St. James Episcopal Church and Rectory is a historic Carpenter Gothic-style Episcopal church and its rectory located in Kittrell, Vance County, North Carolina. It consists of a gable roof main block, three bays long, with a vestibule attached to the front and a small chapel added to the north end. Atop the roof is a belfry. It was built in 1872 and consecrated in 1878. The rectory is located directly behind the church and also has board and batten walls.

On December 14, 1978, it was added to the National Register of Historic Places.
