= Henderson Central Business Historic District =

Historic district in North Carolina, United States

- U.S. National Register of Historic Places
- U.S. Historic district
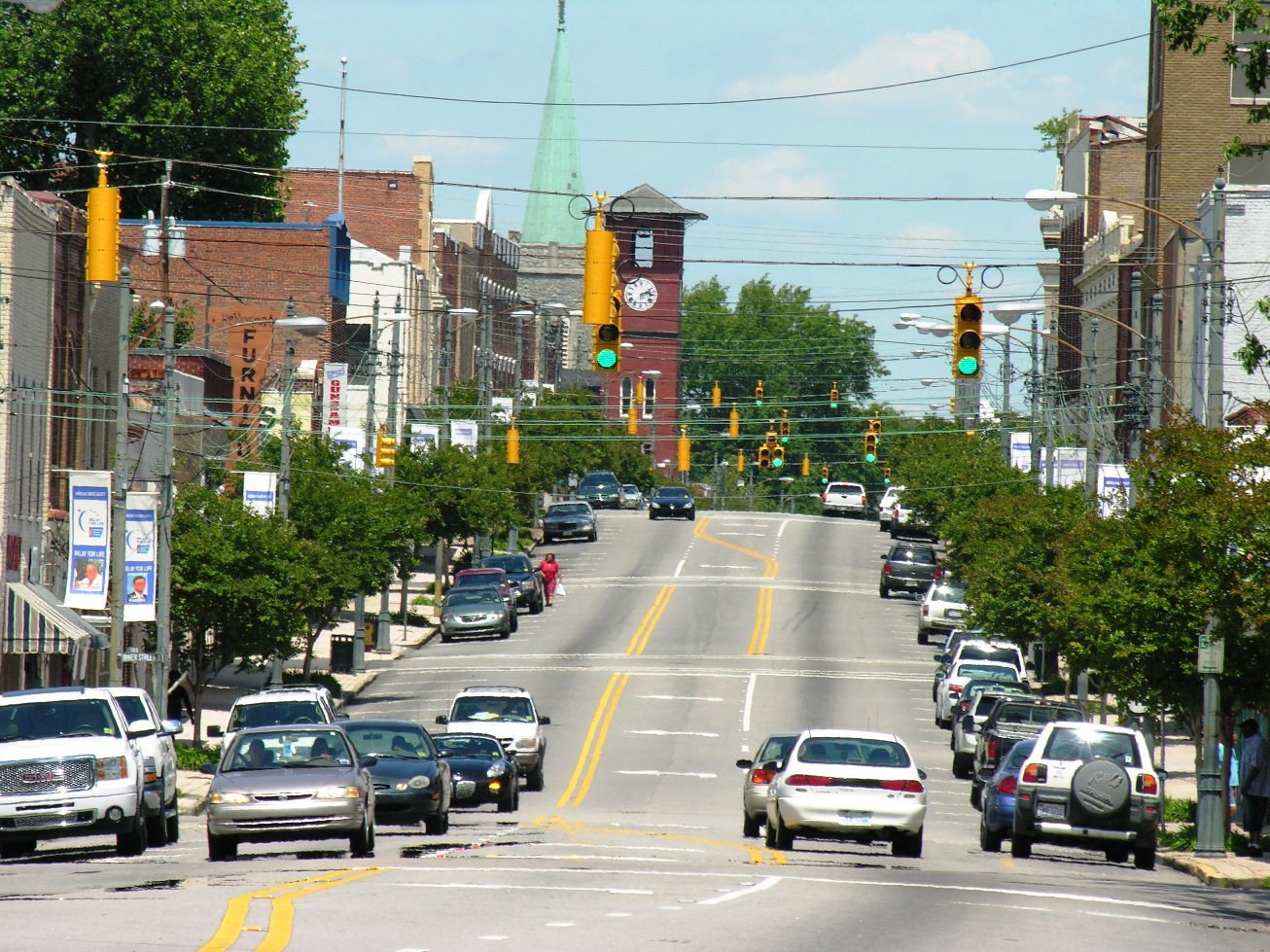
- Henderson Central Business Historic District, May 2008

- Location within North Carolina Location within the United States
- Location: Garnett St. from Church to Young Sts., Henderson, North Carolina
- Coordinates: 36°19′34″N 78°24′19″W
- Area: 46 acres (19 ha)
- Built: 1881
- Architect: Taylor, James Knox; Et al.
- Architectural style: Classical Revival, Romanesque
- NRHP reference No.: 87001249
- Added to NRHP: August 24, 1987

Henderson Central Business Historic District is a national historic district located at Henderson, Vance County, North Carolina. It encompasses 91 contributing buildings and 1 contributing structure in the central business district of Henderson. The district developed between about 1881 and 1937 and includes notable examples of Romanesque Revival and Classical Revival architecture styles. Located in the district are the separately listed Henderson Fire Station and Municipal Building, Vance County Courthouse, and Zollicoffer's Law Office. Other notable buildings include the (former) First National Bank (1921), Davis Department Store (1886, 1911), P. H. Rose Building (1929, 1949), Gaston Railroad Depot (c. 1870), Pogue's Tobacco Works (c. 1880), J, A. Kelly Tobacco Prizehouse (c. 1888), (former) H. Leslie Perry Public Library (1924, 1950s), (former) United States Post Office (1911) designed by the Office of the Supervising Architect under James Knox Taylor, O'Neil Building (1885, 1929), First United Methodist Church (1930), Holy Innocents Episcopal Church (1885, 1916, 1957), and First Presbyterian Church (1900, 1929, 1960).

It was listed on the National Register of Historic Places in 1987.
