= Boylan Apartments =

Historic apartment complex in North Carolina, US

- U.S. National Register of Historic Places
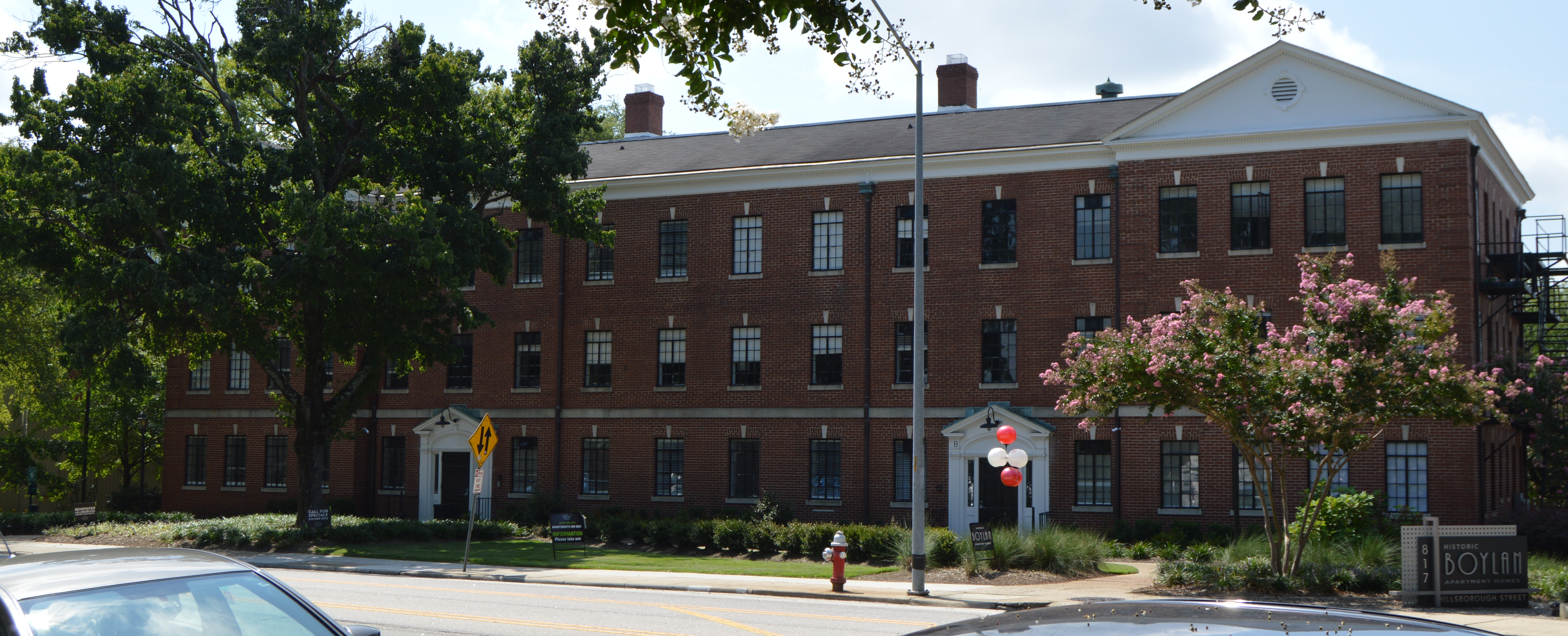
- Northern side

- Location within North Carolina Location within the United States
- Location: 817 Hillsborough St., Raleigh, North Carolina
- Coordinates: 35°46′57″N 78°39′5″W
- Area: 1.1 acres (0.45 ha)
- Built by: T.A. Loving
- Architect: Linthicum & Linthicum
- Architectural style: Colonial Revival
- NRHP reference No.: 07000902
- Added to NRHP: September 5, 2007

Boylan Apartments is a historic apartment complex located in Raleigh, Wake County, North Carolina. The three buildings were built in 1935, and are three-story, Colonial Revival style brick buildings arranged in a "U" shape plan around an open courtyard. Each building consists of 18 one and two-bedroom units. They were designed by the architectural firm Linthicum & Linthicum and built with funds supplied by the Public Works Administration (PWA).

It was listed on the National Register of Historic Places in 2007.
