= Ashburn Hall =

Historic house in North Carolina, United States

- U.S. National Register of Historic Places
- Location within North Carolina Location within the United States
- Location: W of Kittrell on SR 1101, near Kittrell, North Carolina
- Coordinates: 36°12′19″N 78°30′09″W
- Area: 8 acres (3.2 ha)
- Architectural style: Greek Revival
- NRHP reference No.: 77001009
- Added to NRHP: August 16, 1977

Ashburn Hall, also known as the Capehart House, is a historic plantation house located near Kittrell, Vance County, North Carolina. It was built in the 1840s or early 1850s, and is a two‑story, three‑bay, T‑shaped frame dwelling in a restrained Greek Revival style. It features a broad, one‑story pedimented entrance portico, with four spaced, paired fluted Tuscan order columns.

It was listed on the National Register of Historic Places in 1977.
