= Burnside Plantation House =

Historic house in North Carolina, United States

- U.S. National Register of Historic Places
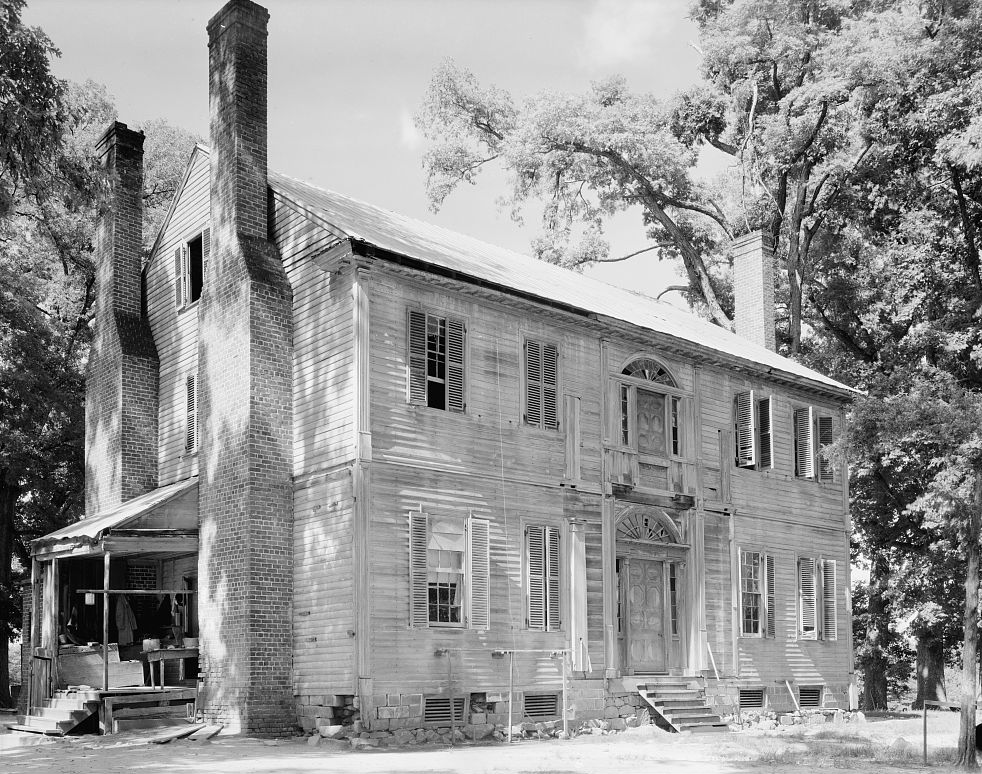
- Burnside Plantation House, 1938, Frances Benjamin Johnston

- Location within North Carolina Location within the United States
- Location: On SR 1335, near Williamsboro, North Carolina
- Coordinates: 36°26′02″N 78°27′45″W
- Area: 8 acres (3.2 ha)
- Built: c. 1800, c. 1824
- Architectural style: Federal
- NRHP reference No.: 71000621
- Added to NRHP: April 16, 1971

Burnside Plantation House is a historic plantation house located near Williamsboro, Vance County, North Carolina. The house in its current form was constructed ca. 1800, remodeled before 1824, includes interior carved woodwork characteristic of the classic revival style and a colonial-era smokehouse dated to about 1760. It is a two-story, five-bay, Federal style frame dwelling with a sheathed weatherboard and gabled roof. Each gable end has a pair of brick chimneys with stepped weatherings.

Originally the home of Memucan Hunt, early American statesman and first Treasurer of North Carolina, during the American Civil War, it was the residence of Thomas Hardy, whose daughter, Pinckney Hardy, became the mother of General Douglas MacArthur.

It was listed on the National Register of Historic Places in 1971.
