= Henderson Fire Station and Municipal Building =

Historic buildings in North Carolina, US

- U.S. National Register of Historic Places
- U.S. Historic district – Contributing property
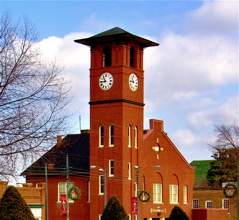
- Henderson Fire Station and Municipal Building, August 2007

- Location within North Carolina Location within the United States
- Location: Garnett and Young Sts., Henderson, North Carolina
- Coordinates: 36°19′40″N 78°24′8″W
- Area: less than one acre
- Built: 1908
- Built by: Bunn, Robert
- NRHP reference No.: 78001973
- Added to NRHP: August 10, 1978

Henderson Fire Station and Municipal Building is a historic fire station and city hall located at Henderson, Vance County, North Carolina. The fire station was built in 1908, and is a two-story, red brick eclectic building with a seven-flight stair clock tower. The city hall section was added in 1928, and is a one-story, L-shaped brick structure.

It was listed on the National Register of Historic Places in 1978. It is located in the Henderson Central Business Historic District.
