= South Henderson, North Carolina =

- CDP
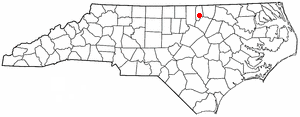
- Location of South Henderson, North Carolina
- Coordinates: 36°18′12″N 78°24′21″W
- Country: United States
- State: North Carolina
- County: Vance

Area
  - Total: 1.80 sq mi (4.67 km^{2})
  - Land: 1.80 sq mi (4.67 km^{2})
  - Water: 0 sq mi (0.00 km^{2})
- Elevation: 512 ft (156 m)

Population (2020)
  - Total: 988
  - Density: 548.3/sq mi (211.69/km^{2})
- Time zone: UTC-5 (Eastern (EST))
  - Summer (DST): UTC-4 (EDT)
- FIPS code: 37-63240
- GNIS feature ID: 2402872

South Henderson is a census-designated place (CDP) in Vance County, North Carolina, United States. As of the 2020 census, South Henderson had a population of 988.

== Geography ==
According to the United States Census Bureau, the CDP has a total area of 1.9 square miles (5.0 km^{2}), all land.

== Demographics ==
Historical population
Census	Pop.	Note	%±
2020	988		—
U.S. Decennial Census

As of the census of 2000, there were 1,220 people, 452 households, and 321 families residing in the CDP. The population density was 629.8 inhabitants per square mile (243.2/km^{2}). There were 505 housing units at an average density of 260.7 per square mile (100.7/km^{2}). The racial makeup of the CDP was 46.89% White, 49.02% African American, 0.08% Native American, 0.49% Asian, 0.41% Pacific Islander, 2.70% from other races, and 0.41% from two or more races. Hispanic or Latino of any race were 8.52% of the population.

There were 452 households, out of which 31.0% had children under the age of 18 living with them, 40.3% were married couples living together, 24.1% had a female householder with no husband present, and 28.8% were non-families. 24.1% of all households were made up of individuals, and 9.1% had someone living alone who was 65 years of age or older. The average household size was 2.70 and the average family size was 3.18.

In the CDP, the population was spread out, with 26.7% under the age of 18, 10.8% from 18 to 24, 27.1% from 25 to 44, 22.5% from 45 to 64, and 12.9% who were 65 years of age or older. The median age was 34 years. For every 100 females, there were 85.1 males. For every 100 females age 18 and over, there were 83.2 males.

The median income for a household in the CDP was $26,008, and the median income for a family was $36,389. Males had a median income of $26,563 versus $20,395 for females. The per capita income for the CDP was $15,221. About 6.3% of families and 8.2% of the population were below the poverty line, including 5.1% of those under age 18 and 4.4% of those age 65 or over.
