= Kittrell, North Carolina =

- Town
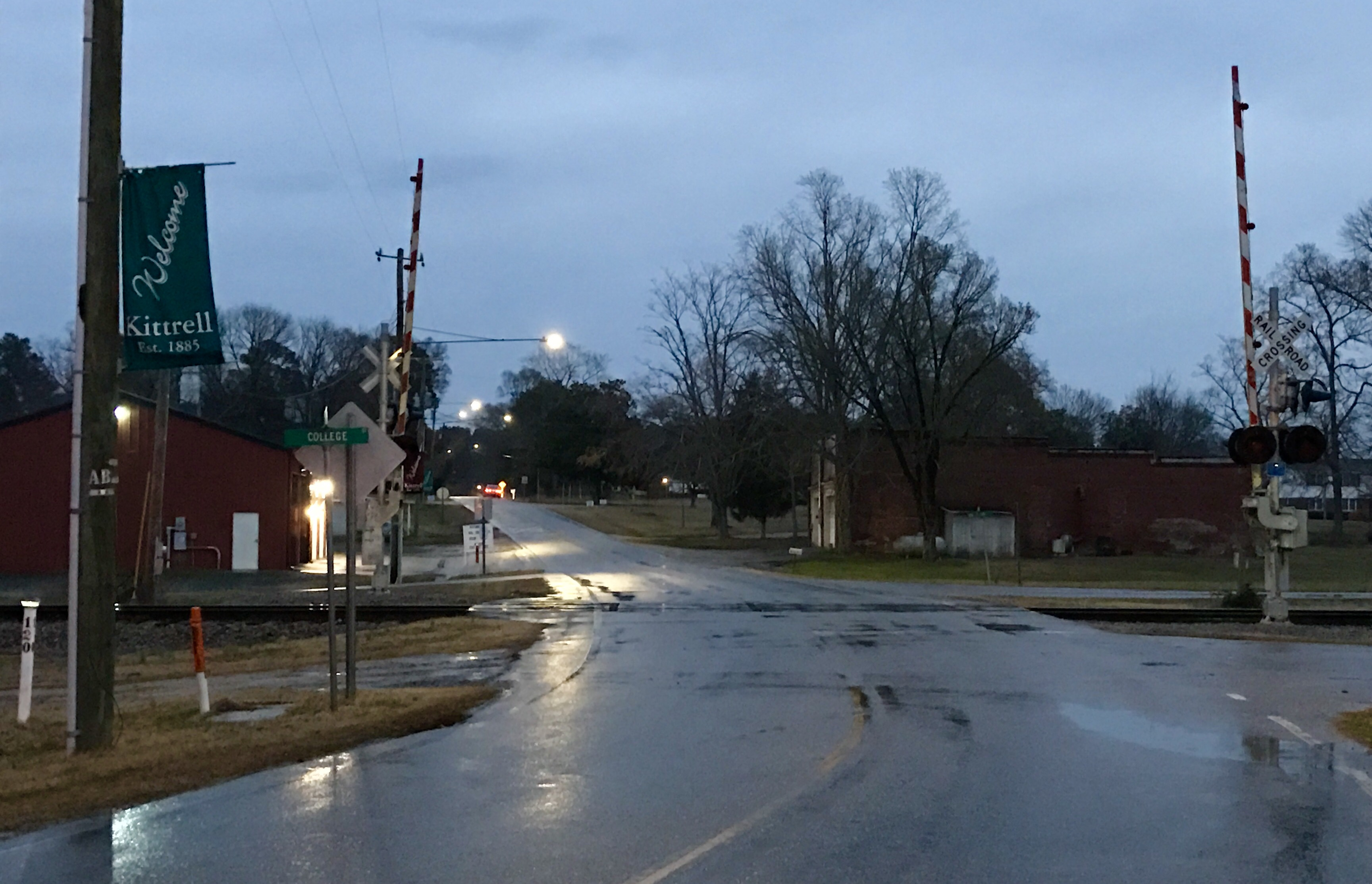
- Main Street as it crosses the CSX Norlina Subdivision in Kittrell.

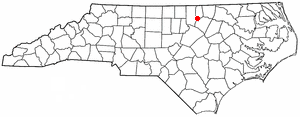
- Location of Kittrell, North Carolina
- Coordinates: 36°13′19″N 78°26′29″W
- Country: United States
- State: North Carolina
- County: Vance

Area
  - Total: 0.21 sq mi (0.54 km^{2})
  - Land: 0.21 sq mi (0.54 km^{2})
  - Water: 0 sq mi (0.00 km^{2})
- Elevation: 427 ft (130 m)

Population (2020)
  - Total: 132
  - Density: 635.1/sq mi (245.23/km^{2})
- Time zone: UTC-5 (Eastern (EST))
  - Summer (DST): UTC-4 (EDT)
- ZIP code: 27544
- Area code: 252
- FIPS code: 37-36020
- GNIS feature ID: 2405955

Kittrell is a town in Vance County, North Carolina, United States. As of the 2020 census, Kittrell had a population of 132.

== History ==
Kittrell was chartered in 1885, with its first mayor David Outlaw, a merchant and bachelor. In 1860, one census district in Granville County the primary of the three parent counties (73% of the land area of Vance County was taken from Granville County) of Vance County, was called Kittrell's Depot. Kittrell's Depot was a railroad depot named for George Kittrell and his wife, Elizabeth Boswell Kittrell, who donated the land for a Raleigh and Gaston Railroad station. The first post office for the Kittrell area, with Elisha Overton as its first postmaster, was established in 1854, replacing one in neighboring Stanton in the Epping Forest area which lacked direct railroad access, this establishment occurring shortly after Kittrell's Depot became operational. An 1868 state law required county governments to divide counties into smaller units of townships. Kittrell Township, including the depot station that is the likely basis for the choice of name, was one of Granville County's creations.

George Kittrell was a grandson of Captain Jonathan Kittrell, commander of a company of Granville County colonial militia during the 1760s and early 1770s, and was a large landholder in Granville County. His holdings included the land upon which the Kittrell Springs Hotel was located. His grandfather Captain Kittrell was also one of the justices (or magistrates) for this county, and was an early Granville pioneer, who immigrated as a young adult to that area, attracted by its cheap, abundant and readily available land, along with two younger brothers Samuel and Isaac, from northeastern North Carolina. Their elder brothers George and John remained in their home area on farms in what is now known as Bertie and Gates County.

Kittrell was the location of Kittrell College, the campus of which later became the Kittrell Job Corps Center.

Ashburn Hall, Thomas Capehart House, Josiah Crudup House, Concord School a Rosenwald School from 1922-1955 (now Kittrell Community Center), and St. James Episcopal Church and Rectory are listed on the National Register of Historic Places.

Kittrell was also home to two famous luxury health hotels during North Carolina's '"Golden Age" of spas, healing springs, and health resorts', the Davis Hotel and Kittrell Springs Hotel.

== Geography ==
According to the United States Census Bureau, the village has a total area of 0.2 square miles (0.52 km^{2}), all of it land.

== Demographics ==
Historical population
Census	Pop.	Note	%±
1890	317		—
1900	168		−47.0%
1910	242		44.0%
1920	223		−7.9%
1930	220		−1.3%
1940	184		−16.4%
1950	189		2.7%
1960	121		−36.0%
1970	427		252.9%
1980	225		−47.3%
1990	228		1.3%
2000	148		−35.1%
2010	467		215.5%
2020	132		−71.7%
U.S. Decennial Census

As of the census of 2000, there were 148 people, 59 households, and 47 families residing in the village. The population density was 711.5 inhabitants per square mile (274.7/km^{2}). There were 68 housing units at an average density of 326.9 per square mile (126.2/km^{2}). The racial makeup of the village was 70.95% White, 27.70% African American, 0.68% Asian, and 0.68% from two or more races. Hispanic or Latino of any race were 2.70% of the population.

There were 59 households, out of which 27.1% had children under the age of 18 living with them, 47.5% were married couples living together, 25.4% had a female householder with no husband present, and 20.3% were non-families. 18.6% of all households were made up of individuals, and 5.1% had someone living alone who was 65 years of age or older. The average household size was 2.51 and the average family size was 2.79.

In the township the population was spread out, with 23.0% under the age of 18, 5.4% from 18 to 24, 29.1% from 25 to 44, 22.3% from 45 to 64, and 20.3% who were 65 years of age or older. The median age was 42 years. For every 100 females, there were 89.7 males. For every 100 females age 18 and over, there were 81.0 males.

The median income for a household in the village was $41,250, and the median income for a family was $48,125. Males had a median income of $35,000 versus $23,750 for females. The per capita income for the village was $17,799. There were 7.3% of families and 8.3% of the population living below the poverty line, including 26.9% of under eighteens and none of those over 64.

The township is currently governed by three council members led by a mayor. The current mayor is Gene Pulley, a lifelong resident of Kittrell, elected in November 2023.

== Notable people ==
- Charity Adams Earley, first African American woman to be an officer in the Women’s Army Auxiliary Corps.
- Mary Hinton, American academic and university president
