= Maria Parham Health =

Historic hospital in North Carolina, US

- Maria Parham Hospital
- U.S. National Register of Historic Places
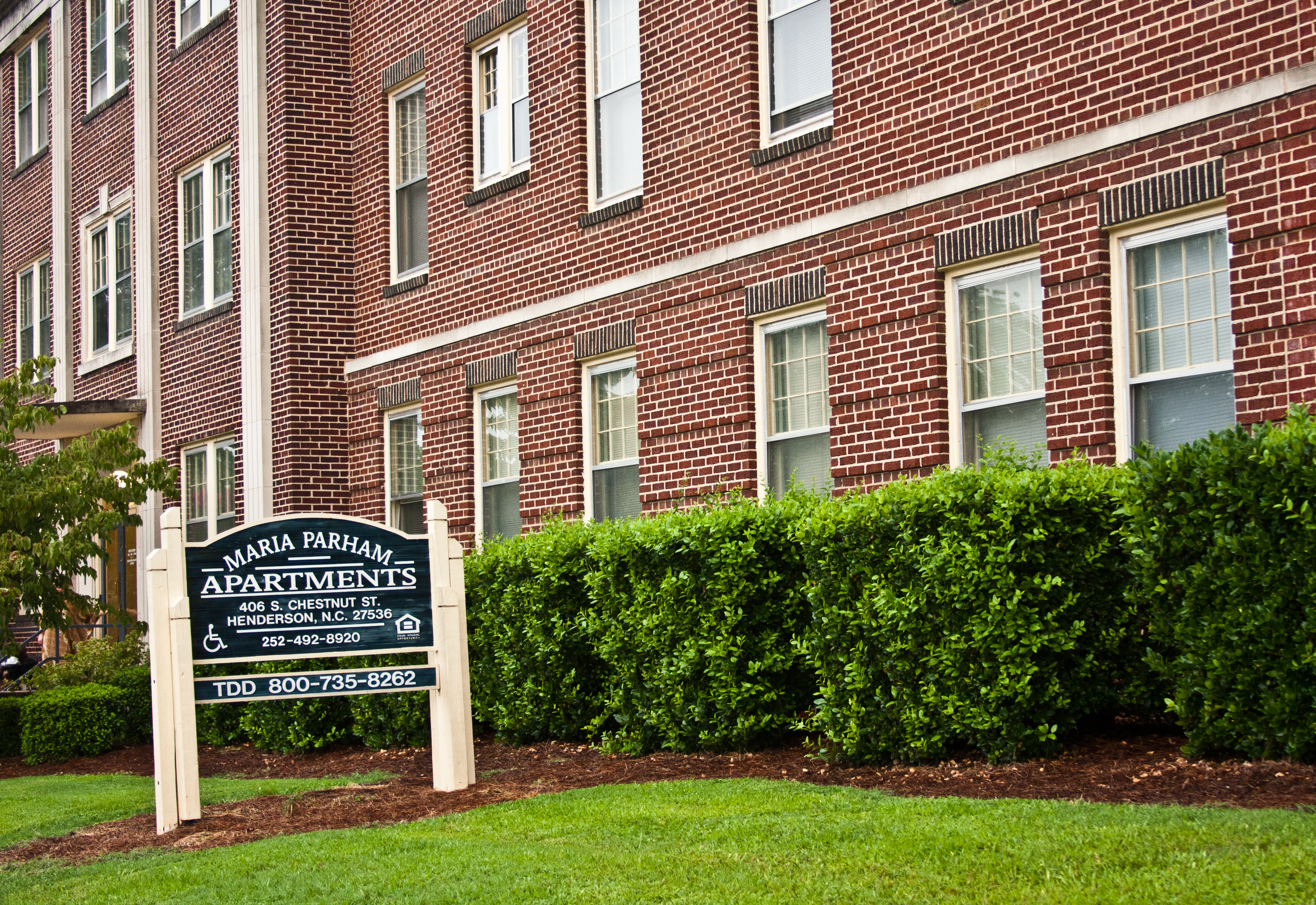
- Maria Parham Hospital, September 2012

- Location within North Carolina Location within the United States
- Location: 406 S. Chestnut St., Henderson, North Carolina
- Coordinates: 36°19′37″N 78°24′30″W
- Area: 1.3 acres (0.53 ha)
- Built: 1925
- Architect: Linthicum and Linthicum
- Architectural style: Colonial Revival
- NRHP reference No.: 94001066
- Added to NRHP: September 2, 1994

Maria Parham Health, formerly known as Maria Parham Hospital and the Maria Parham Medical Center, is a private, full-service regional hospital in Henderson, North Carolina that is part of Duke LifePoint.

The historic 1925 building was listed on the National Register of Historic Places in 1994.

The current hospital is accredited.

== History ==
The hospital was founded in 1925 by five Henderson physicians. It was initially operated as a stock company for profit. The five doctors who founded this early Maria Parham were H.A. Newell, R.T. Upchurch, T.S. Royster, B.G. Allen, and A.P. Newcomb. The 27-bed facility opened its doors on July 1, 1926, with 10 patients, six of whom were transferred from Sarah Elizabeth Hospital.

Maria Parham Hospital was named after Mrs. Maria Southerland Parham, who was married to Samuel Jones Parham, a captain in the U.S. Army. Mr. Parham died at a very young age and left his wife with 7 children. Her sons, especially Sabat Southerland Parham, made significant contributions of money and furnishings to the building's construction in his mother's memory.

In May 1931, the Maria Parham Hospital Association was incorporated by five members of the community and leased from its owners to operate it as a non-profit organization. An addition was built onto the hospital in 1943, which increased its bed capacity to 44. In January 1944, the Association purchased the hospital from its owners for $100,000, and it continues to be operated today as a non-stock, not-for-profit organization, governed by a volunteer Board of Directors.

By 1960, Maria Parham Hospital was finding itself severely pinched for space. It was estimated that more than $1.5 million could be spent to renovate the old hospital and to increase its capacity to 80 beds. However, it would still be an old building in a congested area and would continue to lack the services and convenience needed. A modern, new 100-bed hospital could be built for $1.8 million which would house all the modern facilities and would lend itself to future expansion. A site west of Henderson for the new hospital was given in 1962 by the heirs to the estate of Mr. and Mrs. James H. Brodie. The new 102-bed hospital, as it stood upon opening on November 4, 1965, cost roughly $2.25 million to build and another quarter million to equip. The "new" Maria Parham also represented the beginning of desegregated hospitals in Henderson.

A number of modifications and additions have been made to Maria Parham over the years, including a name change in 2005 to Maria Parham Medical Center.

The J.W. Jenkins Sr. Medical Services Building was constructed in 1974; the John T. Church Building was added in 1990 and the Brodie Waddill Wing was completed in 1997.

In 2005, Maria Parham added a new patient tower and remodeled much of the existing hospital at a cost of over $50 million.

In November 2011, Maria Parham Medical Center sold 80% of the hospital to Duke LifePoint, a joint venture between Duke and LifePoint Health.

== Present status ==
Today, Maria Parham Health, a Duke LifePoint hospital, is a private, full-service regional hospital serving the people of north central North Carolina and Southside Virginia. With a team of more than 150 physicians and 700 clinical and support staff, Maria Parham offers a wide range of services and the latest technology to meet the healthcare needs of the community. Maria Parham, located in Henderson, NC, is fully accredited by both the Joint Commission and CMS.
