= Library and Laboratory Building-Henderson Institute =

Historic school building in North Carolina, United States

- U.S. National Register of Historic Places
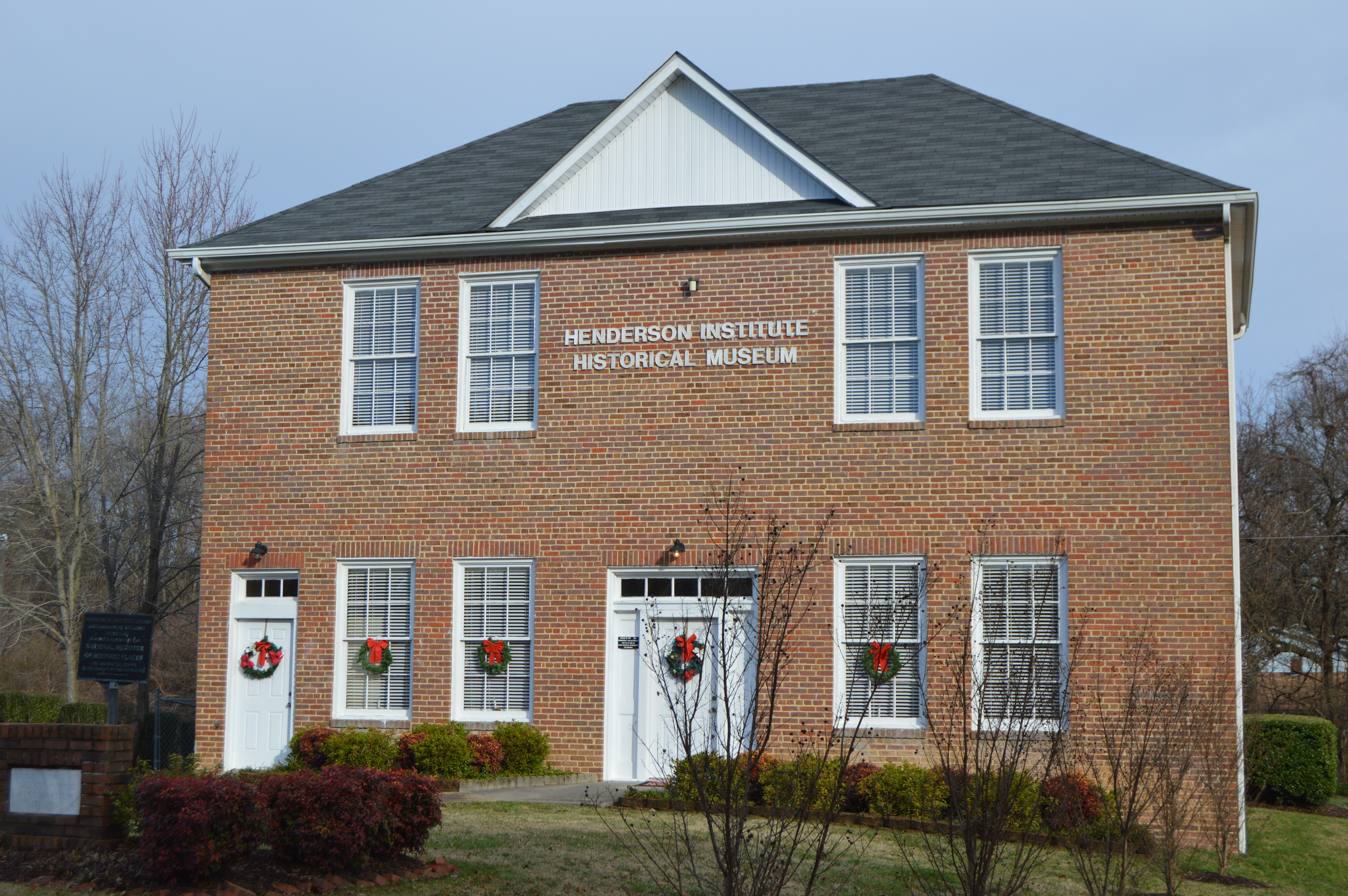
- Front of the building

- Location within North Carolina Location within the United States
- Location: 629 W. Rock Spring St., Henderson, North Carolina
- Coordinates: 36°20′18″N 78°24′0″W
- Area: less than one acre
- Architectural style: Colonial Revival
- NRHP reference No.: 95001399
- Added to NRHP: November 29, 1995

Library and Laboratory Building-Henderson Institute is a historic school building located at Henderson, North Carolina. It was built in 1928, and is a plain, two-story brick building with Colonial Revival-style design elements. It is the only surviving reminder of the Henderson Institute that was established in the town of Henderson in Vance County in 1887. The Henderson Institute was established by the Freedmen's Mission Board of the United Presbyterian Church of North America to provide secondary education for African-Americans. The building houses the Henderson Institute Historical Museum.

It was listed on the National Register of Historic Places in 1995.
