= West End School (Henderson, North Carolina) =

Historic school building in North Carolina, United States

- U.S. National Register of Historic Places
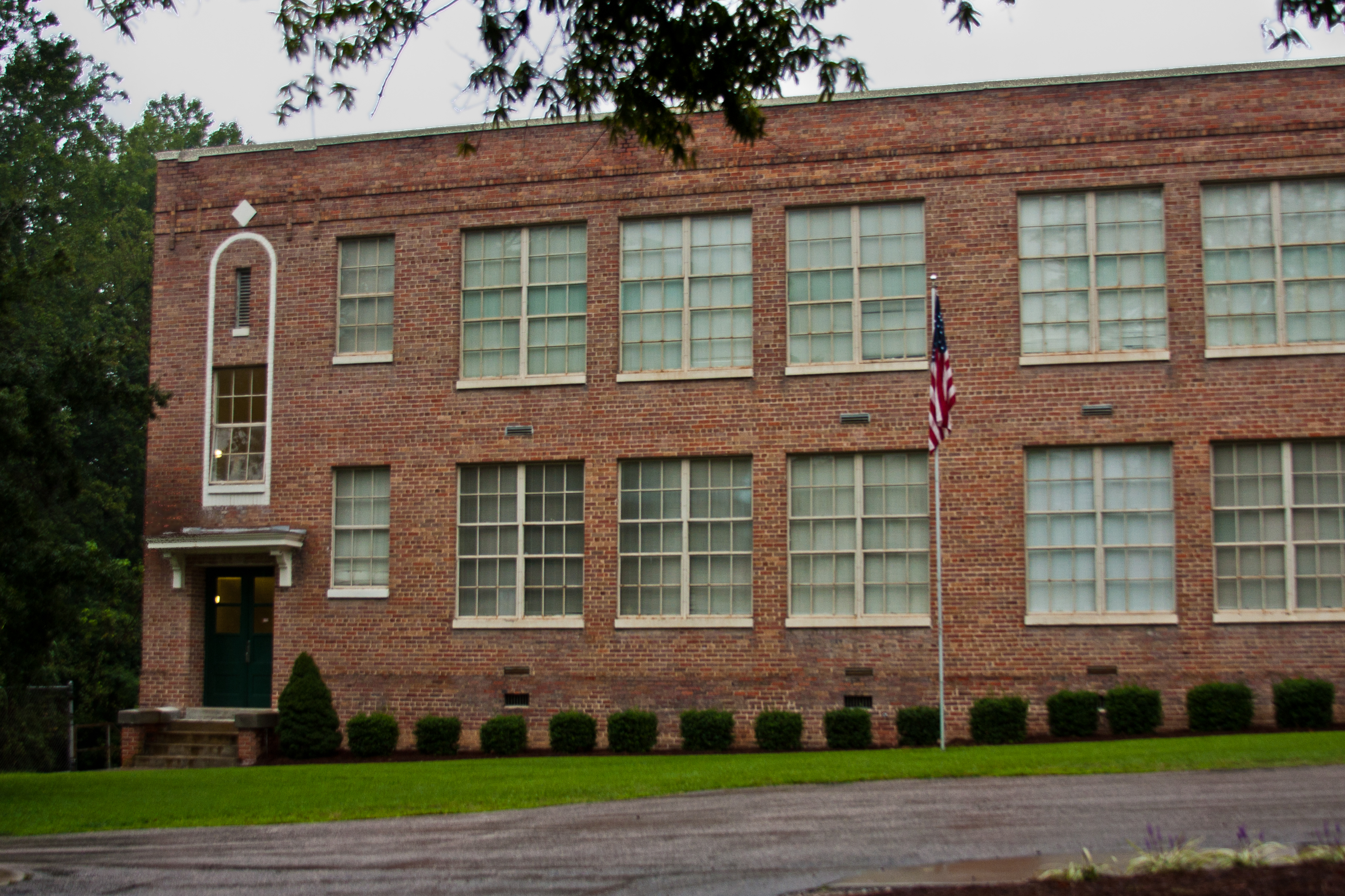
- West End School, September 2012

- Location within North Carolina Location within the United States
- Location: 1000 S. Chestnut St., Henderson, North Carolina
- Coordinates: 36°19′24″N 78°24′48″W
- Area: 2.2 acres (0.89 ha)
- Built: 1922
- Architectural style: Late 19th And 20th Century Revivals
- NRHP reference No.: 04001585
- Added to NRHP: February 2, 2005

West End School is a historic school building located at Henderson, Vance County, North Carolina. It was built in 1922, and is a two-story, 10 bay wide, red brick school. An addition was built about 1960, and is connected to the main school building by a 1 1/2-story hyphen. In 2003 the building was converted into 11 apartment units for the elderly.

It was listed on the National Register of Historic Places in 2005.
