= St. John's Episcopal Church (St. John's, North Carolina) =

Historic church in North Carolina, United States

- U.S. National Register of Historic Places
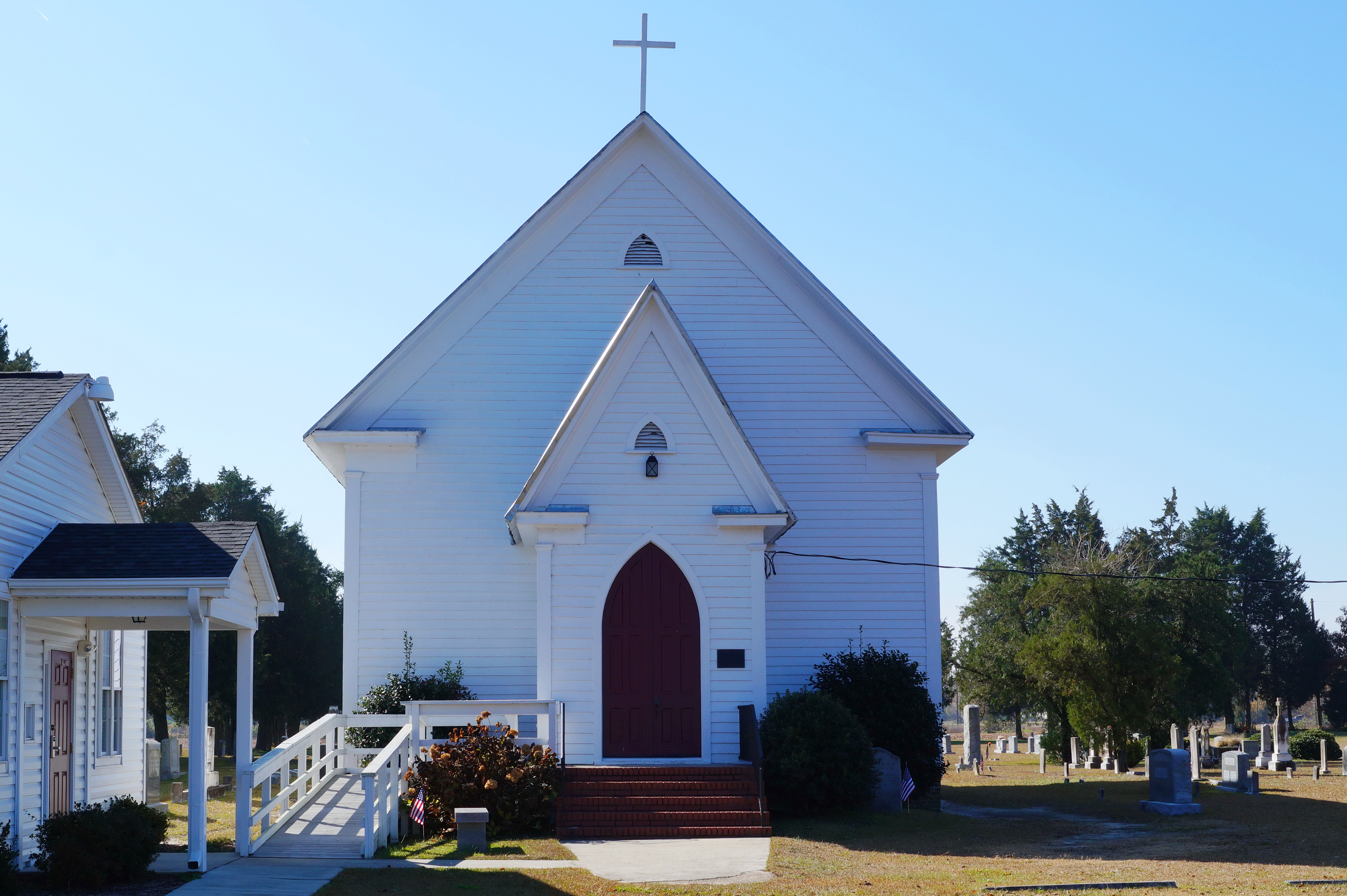

- Location within North Carolina Location within the United States
- Location: SE corner of SR 1917 and SR 1753, St. John's, North Carolina
- Coordinates: 35°22′24″N 77°21′36″W
- Area: 3.2 acres (1.3 ha)
- Built: 1893-1895
- Built by: Barrington, Stephen Gus
- Architectural style: Gable-front form
- NRHP reference No.: 86003268
- Added to NRHP: December 2, 1986

St. John's Episcopal Church is a historic Episcopal church located on the southeast corner of SR 1917 and SR 1753 in St. John's, Pitt County, North Carolina. It was built between 1893 and 1895, and is a one-story, gable front frame building. It has a projecting vestibule, is sheathed in weatherboard, rests on a brick pier foundation, and has a steeply pitched gable roof. The interior features a barrel vault ceiling.

It was added to the National Register of Historic Places in 1986.
