= Mistletoe Villa =

Historic house in North Carolina, United States

- U.S. National Register of Historic Places

- Location within North Carolina Location within the United States
- Location: 144 E. Young Avenue, Henderson, North Carolina
- Coordinates: 36°19′14″N 78°24′33″W
- Area: 2.46 acres (1.00 ha)
- Built: 1855 (foundation); 1883-1885 current structure
- Architect: Samuel Sloan
- Architectural style: Queen Anne
- NRHP reference No.: 78001974
- Added to NRHP: September 10, 1978

The Hughes-Young House, most commonly known as Mistletoe Villa, is a historic house in Henderson, North Carolina, United States. The house is often cited for its ornate Victorian detail and architectural elements. The first house on the site was built for William H. Hughes and completed in 1855. From 1883 to 1885, the house was significantly redesigned and overbuilt on the previous foundation for Ike J. Young, American Civil War Colonel and four-term mayor of Henderson. The design of the current house is attributed to the famed architect Samuel Sloan but that fact has not been officially documented.

== History ==
In 1853, Demetrius Ellis Young sold two acres of land to William H. Hughes, which was claimed to be the highest point between Weldon, North Carolina and Raleigh, North Carolina. This land had previously been set aside for an all-male educational academy that had been operating for the last decade. It would instead be used as the site of the Hughes house, a Greek Revival style dwelling which was completed in 1855. In the years following the American Civil War, Hughes experienced a number of financial problems and became unable to continue repayment of his debt for the land. An extended court battle ensued between the Hughes and Young families and ultimately the land was returned to the Youngs in 1883. The heir to the land, Colonel Ike J. Young, began working on plans for a significant redesign and rebuilding of the Hughes house.

It is widely speculated that well-known Philadelphia-based architect Samuel Sloan was commissioned to dramatically redesign the Hughes house. Sloan was working in North Carolina on another prominent structures in 1883, including the North Carolina Executive Mansion in Raleigh. Distinct similarities between the completed Mistletoe Villa and the Executive mansion, down to the final color scheme, are often cited by historians as evidence of Sloan's involvement in the design. Unfortunately Sloan died in Raleigh in 1884, before either project was completed. As construction was nearing completion in 1885, Colonel Young made a trip to New York City in search of furnishings for the new home where suffered a stroke and died, never having the opportunity to claim the house as a home.

The newly over-built house extends beyond the original stone foundation of the Hughes house, which is still visible. A number of indoor elements, including floor boards, doors, lock hardware, mantels and others items were preserved and repurposed in the house. The completed house is an example of Queen Anne Style Victorian architecture and features multi-faceted detail woodwork. The house was originally lighted by carbide light fixtures which were fueled by gas generated on the property in a small brick building and piped into the house. Although unusual for the era, the house was equipped with indoor plumbing which was supplied and pressurized by a large reservoir in the attic which functioned similarly to a simple water tower. The house also contained other innovative elements for the time including a "speak tube" which would allow people in the dining room to communicate with servants in the kitchen on the floor below. A button was also integrated into the floor of the dining room which, when pressed, would alert servants downstairs that assistance was desired upstairs.

During World War II, a 30-foot square iron widow's walk on the roof was donated to the U.S. Government, which was looking for scrap metal from civilians to aide in the war effort. During that same period, trains transporting U.S. troops would pass the house and deliver German prisoners of war to a factory next door to work. Children growing up in the house described having conversations with German prisoners with the assistance of a translator as well as playing games of catch with them.

It is unknown exactly when the house was given its distinctive name but it has been attributed to "all the mistletoe that just drooled from the trees."

== Restoration efforts ==
Mistletoe Villa was abandoned in 1964 and would remain unoccupied for more than a decade. Near the end of the 1970s, the house was added to the National Register of Historic Places and was sold to the NC Historic Preservation Fund to search for a new owners. In 1979, a couple from Washington, D.C. bought the house after seeing it featured in an advertisement in a history-related publication. The couple would complete a 500-mile round trip every other-weekend to make repairs and would own the house until 1991. In addition to using the house as a weekend retreat and project, they opened the house to the public and allowed for catered events and parties, a trend that would continue through some future owners as well. Future owners, Anthony & Janey Brown of Henderson NC, bought the property in 2004, and renovated it to its original splendor. Adding a water fountain, new roof, multiple foundation upgrades, multiple flower beds and splendid floral gardens, the property was used as an event space, hosting many weddings, receptions. proms, dances, state dinners and parties. The home was recently purchased by another local North Carolina couple who hope to continue the never ending work of bringing it back to its glory days.
