= Vance County Public Schools =

School district in Vance Country, North Carolina, United States

Vance County Public Schools is a school district in Vance County, North Carolina, United States. The superintendent is Dr. Cindy W. Bennett. She began her tenure as Superintendent on July 1, 2021. The school district has 16 schools: 9 traditional elementary schools, 1 year-round elementary, 2 middle schools, 2 high schools (both early start calendars), as well as a K-12 virtual school and a 6-12 flex school.

Vance County Schools is located in Henderson, NC and serves over 5,000 students.

== Schools ==
It operates the following schools:

- Aycock Elementary School
- Carver Elementary School
- Clarke Elementary School
- Dabney Elementary School
- E. M. Rollins STEAM Academy
- E.O. Young Elementary School
- L.B. Yancey Elementary School
- New Hope Elementary School
- Pinkston Street Elementary School
- Zeb Vance Elementary School
- Vance County Early College High School
- Vance County Middle School
- Vance County High School
- AdVance Academy
- Vance Virtual Village Academy
