= Williamsboro, North Carolina =

Williamsboro Township, North Carolina
- Township
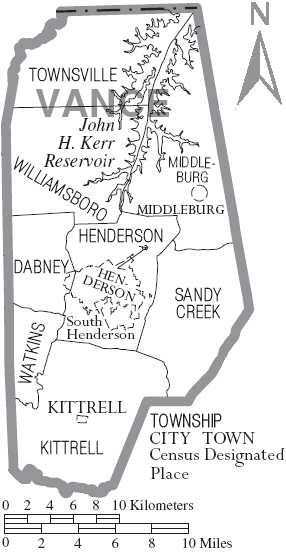
- Map of Vance County, with municipal and township labels
- Coordinates: 36°25′50″N 78°25′54″W
- Country: United States
- State: North Carolina
- County: Vance

Area
  - Total: 38.9 sq mi (101 km^{2})
- Elevation: 427 ft (130 m)

Population (July 1, 2018)
  - Total: 3,475
  - Estimate: 15,166
  - Density: 89.3/sq mi (34.5/km^{2})
- Time zone: UTC−5 (Eastern (EST))
  - Summer (DST): UTC−4 (EDT)
- ZIP codes: 27537
- GNIS feature ID: 997393

Williamsboro or Williamsborough is an unincorporated community in Vance County, North Carolina, United States. It was established in about 1755 as Williamsborough in Granville County in the Province of North Carolina. It became part of Vance County in 1881 when Vance County was founded. Williamsboro is located in Williamsboro Township, an administrative division of Vance County.

== History ==
The town of Williamsborough was established by Nathaniel Williams and his wife Elizabeth Washington. They were the parents of John Williams, who served in the Continental Congress and as a judge on the U.S. Supreme Court. Judge John Williams donated the land where the town was built, and it was named after him in 1779. Williamsborough served as a temporary capital of North Carolina between the summer of 1781 and February 1782, after the capture of Governor Thomas Burke during the American Revolution.

Williamsborough was originally called "Lick" because it was a watering hole for cattle and then "Nutbush" because of the nearby creek with that name. The town grew up along the east-west and north-south stagecoach lines.

The Nutbush Address was given by George Sims on June 6, 1765. Sims was from Nutbush. This address was a protest about provincial and county officials and the fees they charged residents of Granville County. This later led to the Regulator Movement in North Carolina.

When the Raleigh and Gaston Railroad was built in 1840, it bypassed Williamsborough. This, along with the end of slavery after the U.S. Civil War and the demise of plantation life, led to the decline of the town of Williamsborough.

The town has been known as Williamsboro since 1893. There was a post office from May 14, 1879 to February 15, 1909. The first postmaster was John E. Haithcock.

There is also a Williamsborough Township in Vance County, North Carolina. This township is a rural, non-functioning county subdivision of Vance County that was created to conform to the North Carolina Constitution of 1868.

Historic sites in or near Williamsboro include:

- Belvidere historic plantation, built in 1850
- Bingham School, the first armed forces academy, was built in 1826 by Captain D. H. Bingham in Williamsborough. It served for a short time as a training school for military officers.
- Burnside Plantation House, originally built in 1800
- Pool Rock Plantation, built in 1757
- St. John's Episcopal Church, built in 1757 and the oldest frame church in North Carolina

== Geography and demographics ==
Williamsboro Township is bounded by Townsville Township to the north; Dabney and Henderson Township to the south; John Kerr Reservoir, Middleburg Township, and Warren Township to the east, and Granville County to the west.

| Year | Williamsboro Township (including Williamsboro) | Williamsboro |
|---|---|---|
| 1960 | | |
| 1950 | | |
| 1940 | 1740 | |
| 1930 | 2426 | |
| 1920 | 2371 | |
| 1910 | 1,380 | |
| 1900 | 1,462 | |
| 1890 | 1,670 | 134 |
| 1880 | | 176 |
