= Henderson, North Carolina =

- City
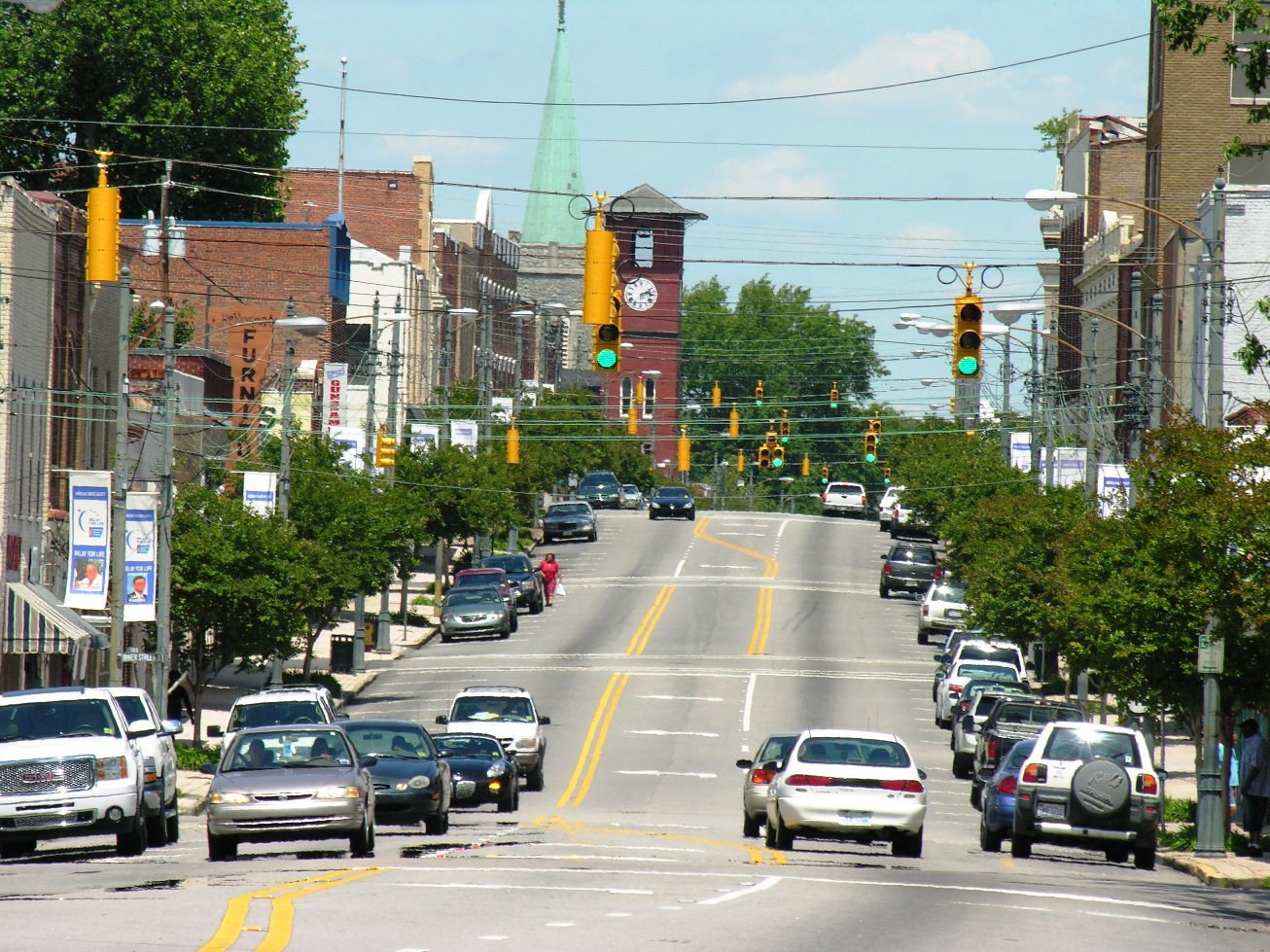
- Downtown Henderson

- Flag Seal
- Nicknames: The Gateway City, Triangle North, Lil’ Durham, The Gate's
- Motto(s): "Progress, Pride, Potential"
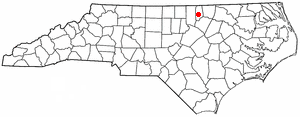
- Location of Henderson, North Carolina

- Location in the United States
- Coordinates: 36°19′33″N 78°24′55″W
- Country: United States
- State: North Carolina
- County: Vance
- Established: December 5th 2005
- Named after: Leonard Henderson

Government
  - Type: Municipality

Area
  - Total: 8.63 sq mi (22.35 km^{2})
  - Land: 8.63 sq mi (22.34 km^{2})
  - Water: 0.0039 sq mi (0.01 km^{2})
- Elevation: 440 ft (130 m)

Population (2020)
  - Total: 15,060
  - Density: 1,746.2/sq mi (674.21/km^{2})
- Demonym: Hendersonian
- Time zone: UTC−5 (Eastern (EST))
  - Summer (DST): UTC−4 (EDT)
- ZIP codes: 27536-27537
- Area code: 252
- FIPS code: 37-30660
- GNIS feature ID: 2404683
- Website: henderson.nc.gov

Henderson is a city in and the county seat of Vance County, North Carolina, United States. The population was 15,060 at the 2020 census.

== History ==
The city was named in honor of former North Carolina Supreme Court Chief Justice Leonard Henderson, who lived nearby and was a friend of early settler Lewis Reavis. Henderson was officially chartered by the North Carolina General Assembly in 1841.

Prior to the creation of Vance County in 1881, Henderson was located in far eastern Granville County.

Ashland, Henderson Central Business Historic District, Henderson Fire Station and Municipal Building, Library and Laboratory Building-Henderson Institute, Mistletoe Villa, Maria Parham Hospital, Daniel Stone Plank House, Vance County Courthouse, West End School, Zollicoffer's Law Office, and Barker House are listed on the National Register of Historic Places.

== Geography ==
According to the United States Census Bureau, the city has a total area of 8.2 square miles (21 km^{2}), of which 8.2 square miles (21 km^{2}) is land and 0.12% is water.

Henderson benefits from its location near Interstate 85 and U.S. 1. Highway 39 also runs through Henderson.

== Demographics ==
Historical population
Census	Pop.	Note	%±
1860	186		—
1870	1,635		779.0%
1880	1,421		−13.1%
1890	4,191		194.9%
1900	3,746		−10.6%
1910	4,503		20.2%
1920	5,222		16.0%
1930	6,345		21.5%
1940	7,647		20.5%
1950	10,996		43.8%
1960	12,740		15.9%
1970	13,896		9.1%
1980	13,522		−2.7%
1990	15,655		15.8%
2000	16,095		2.8%
2010	15,368		−4.5%
2020	15,060		−2.0%
2025 (est.)	15,013	▼	−0.3%
U.S. Decennial Census

=== Racial and ethnic composition ===
Henderson city, North Carolina – Racial and ethnic composition Note: the US Census treats Hispanic/Latino as an ethnic category. This table excludes Latinos from the racial categories and assigns them to a separate category. Hispanics/Latinos may be of any race.
Race / Ethnicity (NH = Non-Hispanic)	Pop 2000	Pop 2010	Pop 2020	% 2000	% 2010	% 2020
White alone (NH)	5,562	4,290	3,453	34.56%	27.92%	22.93%
Black or African American alone (NH)	9,474	9,748	9,720	58.86%	63.43%	64.54%
Native American or Alaska Native alone (NH)	39	37	37	0.24%	0.24%	0.25%
Asian alone (NH)	103	127	171	0.64%	0.83%	1.14%
Native Hawaiian or Pacific Islander alone (NH)	4	0	2	0.02%	0.00%	0.01%
Other race alone (NH)	9	16	45	0.06%	0.10%	0.30%
Mixed race or Multiracial (NH)	78	168	363	0.48%	1.09%	2.41%
Hispanic or Latino (any race)	826	982	1,269	5.13%	6.39%	8.43%
Total	16,095	15,368	15,060	100.00%	100.00%	100.00%

=== 2020 census ===
As of the 2020 census, Henderson had a population of 15,060, with 6,148 households and 3,549 families residing in the city. The median age was 39.9 years. 24.3% of residents were under the age of 18 and 19.3% were 65 years of age or older. For every 100 females, there were 83.4 males, and for every 100 females age 18 and over, there were 79.0 males age 18 and over.

100.0% of residents lived in urban areas, while 0.0% lived in rural areas.

There were 6,876 housing units, of which 10.6% were vacant. The homeowner vacancy rate was 2.5% and the rental vacancy rate was 6.4%. Of all households, 31.4% had children under the age of 18 living in them, 25.9% were married-couple households, 20.2% were households with a male householder and no spouse or partner present, and 47.3% were households with a female householder and no spouse or partner present. About 35.2% of all households were made up of individuals and 16.3% had someone living alone who was 65 years of age or older.

=== 2000 census ===
At the 2000 census there were 16,095 people, 6,332 households, and 4,122 families living in the city. The population density was 1,953.7 inhabitants per square mile (754.3/km^{2}). There were 6,870 housing units at an average density of 833.9 per square mile (322.0/km^{2}). The racial makeup of the city was 59.17% African American, 32.76% White, 0.27% Native American, 0.64% Asian, 0.02% Pacific Islander, 2.36% from other races, and 0.77% from two or more races. Hispanic or Latino people of any race were 5.13%.

Of the 6,332 households 31.3% had children under the age of 18 living with them, 34.1% were married couples living together, 26.7% had a female householder with no husband present, and 34.9% were non-families. 30.7% of households were one person and 14.4% were one person aged 65 or older. The average household size was 2.47 and the average family size was 3.05.

The age distribution was 27.4% under the age of 18, 8.9% from 18 to 24, 26.8% from 25 to 44, 20.6% from 45 to 64, and 16.4% 65 or older. The median age was 36 years. For every 100 females, there were 82.2 males. For every 100 females age 18 and over, there were 75.5 males.

The median household income was $23,745 and the median family income was $30,222. Males had a median income of $26,804 versus $19,910 for females. The per capita income for the city was $15,130. About 23.4% of families and 28.3% of the population were below the poverty line, including 40.5% of those under age 18 and 20.9% of those age 65 or over.

== Transportation ==
=== Rail ===
Henderson is located on the S-Line, the former main line of the Seaboard Air Line Railroad now owned by CSX Transportation. The city was last served by passenger rail in 1986, at which time Amtrak's long-distance Silver Star was re-routed through Rocky Mount and part of the S-Line was abandoned. Restoration of the line is planned as part of the Southeast High Speed Rail Corridor project.

== Education ==
The school district for the whole county is Vance County Schools.

== Historical sites ==
Vance County is known for landmarks such has the Vance County Courthouse (built in 1884), and St. John's Episcopal Church (established in 1773), which is one of the three remaining colonial church buildings in North Carolina. The Kerr Lake State Recreation Area operates Kerr Lake, which dates from the 1950s and is the largest man-made lake on the eastern side of the United States.

Roses Discount Stores was first founded by Paul Howard Rose, and its headquarters are in Henderson.

== Notable people ==
- Gerald Alston (1951 – ), member of R&B vocal group The Manhattans
- George Lincoln Blackwell (1861 – 1926), theologian and author
- Charles Briggs (1932 – 1985), actor
- Charlotte Hawkins Brown (1883 – 1961), educator and founder of the Palmer Institute
- Jason Brown (1983 – ), professional football player with the St. Louis Rams
- Duke Buchan (1963 – ), United States ambassador to Spain and Andorra, raised near Henderson
- Danny Flowers (1948 – ), songwriter of "Tulsa Time"
- Elson Floyd (1956 – 2015), educator and 10th president of Washington State University
- Rachel Henderlite (1905 –1991), Presbyterian minister and educator
- David Henderson (1964 -), basketball player, 1991 Israeli Basketball Premier League MVP
- Isaiah Hicks (1994 – ), basketball player for the New York Knicks
- Sammy Jackson (1937 – 1995), actor
- Ben E. King (1938 – 2015), soul and pop singer, best known as the singer and co-composer of "Stand by Me"
- Shirley Owens (1941 – ), singer, member of the Shirelles
- Charlie Rose (1942 – ), television talk show host and journalist, born and raised in Henderson
- Wilbur Fisk Tillett (1854–1936), theologian and dean of Vanderbilt Divinity School
