= Vance County, North Carolina =

County in North Carolina, United States

- County
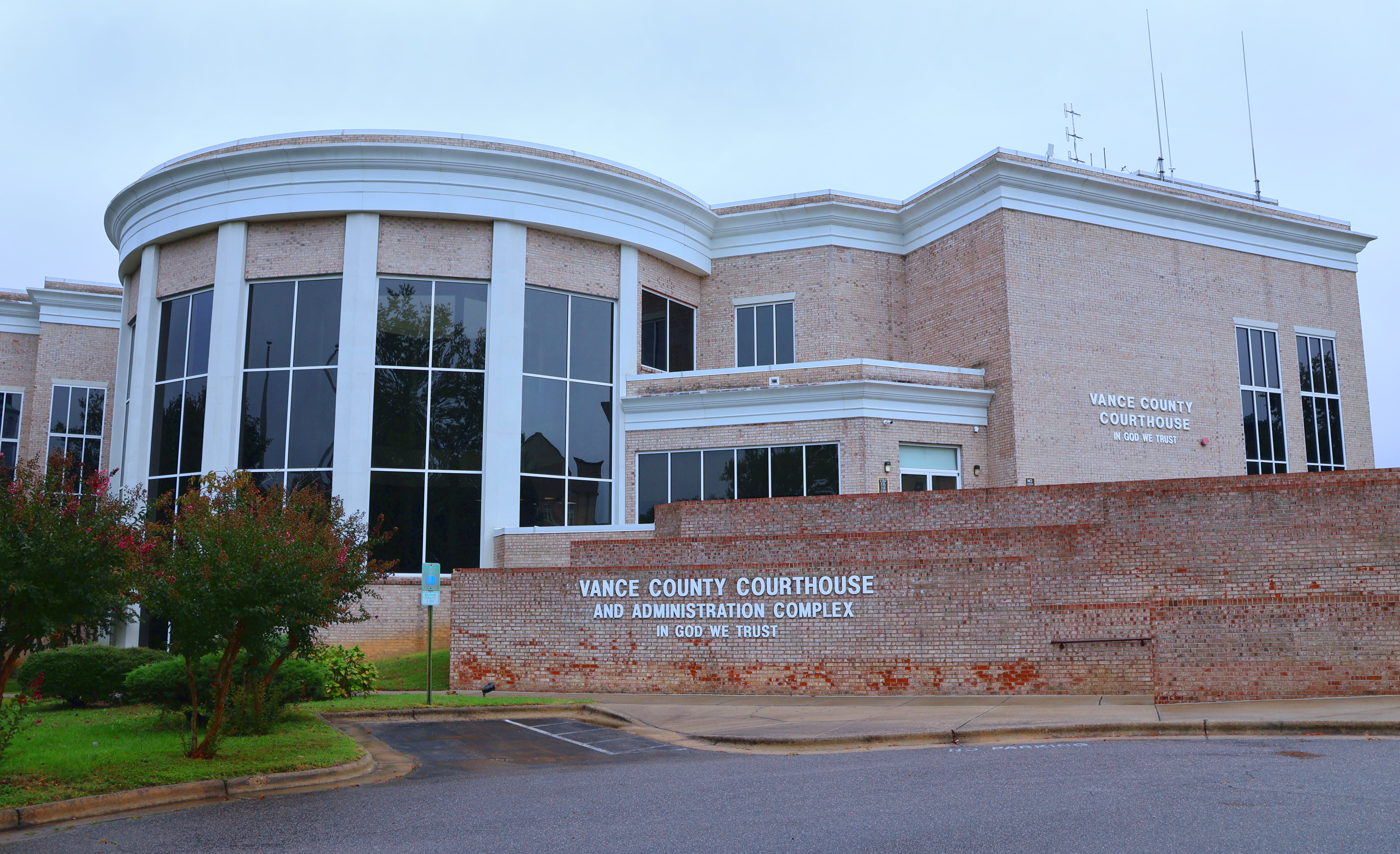
- Vance County Courthouse

- Flag Seal

- Location within the U.S. state of North Carolina
- Coordinates: 36.37°N 78.41°W
- Country: United States
- State: North Carolina
- Founded: 1881
- Named for: Zebulon Baird Vance
- Seat: Henderson
- Largest community: Henderson

Area
  - Total: 268.69 sq mi (695.9 km^{2})
  - Land: 252.40 sq mi (653.7 km^{2})
  - Water: 16.29 sq mi (42.2 km^{2}) 6.06%

Population (2020)
  - Total: 42,578
  - Estimate (2025): 42,638 ▲
  - Density: 168.69/sq mi (65.133/km^{2})
- Time zone: UTC−5 (Eastern)
  - Summer (DST): UTC−4 (EDT)
- Congressional district: 1st
- Website: www.vancecounty.org

Vance County is a county located in the U.S. state of North Carolina. As of the 2020 census, the population was 42,578. Its county seat is Henderson. Vance County comprises the Henderson, NC Micropolitan Statistical Area, which is also included in the Raleigh-Durham-Cary, NC Combined Statistical Area, which had an estimated population of 2,368,947 in 2023.

== History ==
The Occaneechi Native Americans were the first inhabitants of what became Vance County in 1881. The first white explorer of the region was John Lederer and his Native American guide in 1670.

Originally part of colony of Virginia, King Charles of England redrew the colony lines in 1665, so what is now Vance County became part of the Province of Carolina and then the Province of North Carolina in 1725.

In 1826, the first armed forces academy, the Bingham School, was built by Captain D. H. Bingham in Williamsborough, North Carolina. It served for a short time as a training school for military officers.

In 1871, a hotel called the "Glass House" was opened near the community of Kittrell. It was so named because of the glass porches surrounding the hotel. It was a popular resort for hunters and later tuberculosis patients until it burned down in 1895.

As the area that is Vance County prospered in the mid to late 1880s, there were efforts to create a county named "Gilliam" and later as "Dortch". However, Vance County was formed by the legislature in 1881 following the Reconstruction Era from parts of Franklin, Granville, and Warren counties. The county is named after Zebulon Baird Vance, a governor of North Carolina (1862–65 & 1877–79) and United States senator (1879–94).

According to the 1955 book, Zeb's Black Baby, by Samuel Thomas Peace, Sr., this was a political decision to concentrate blacks and Republicans in one county and keep Democratic majorities in the other counties, an example of gerrymandering:

"The formation of Vance County was accomplished largely as a political expediency. It was in 1881 when Blacks in large numbers were voting solidly Republican. Granville and Franklin Counties were nip and tuck, Democratic or Republican. From the Democratic standpoint, Warren County was hopelessly Republican. But by taking from Granville, Franklin and Warren, those sections that were heavily Republican and out of these sections forming the new county of Vance, the Democratic party could lose Vance to the Republicans and save Granville and Franklin for the Democrats. [U.S.] Senator Vance was a Democrat. He took kindly to this move and thanked the [North Carolina] Legislature for honoring him with naming the new county after him. At the same time...Vance showed his humor by always referring to Vance County as 'Zeb's Black Baby.'"

In the 1890 Census, Vance County was more than 63 percent African American. In 1894 a biracial coalition of Populists and Republicans elected African American George Henry White to the US Congress and gained control of the state house. The Democrats were determined to forestall this happening again. White strongly opposed the new constitution, saying "I cannot live in North Carolina and be a man and be treated as a man." He left the state after his second term expired, setting up a business in Washington, DC.

The Democrats in the North Carolina legislature settled the political competition with the Republicans by following other southern states and passing a law in 1896 making voting more difficult, and a new constitution in 1899 that disfranchised most blacks by poll taxes, literacy tests and grandfather clauses. Contemporary accounts estimated that 75,000 black male citizens of the state lost the vote. In 1900 blacks numbered 630,207 citizens, about 33% of the state's total population. This situation held until past the mid-20th century and after passage of the federal Voting Rights Act of 1965.

== Geography ==
Interactive map of Vance County

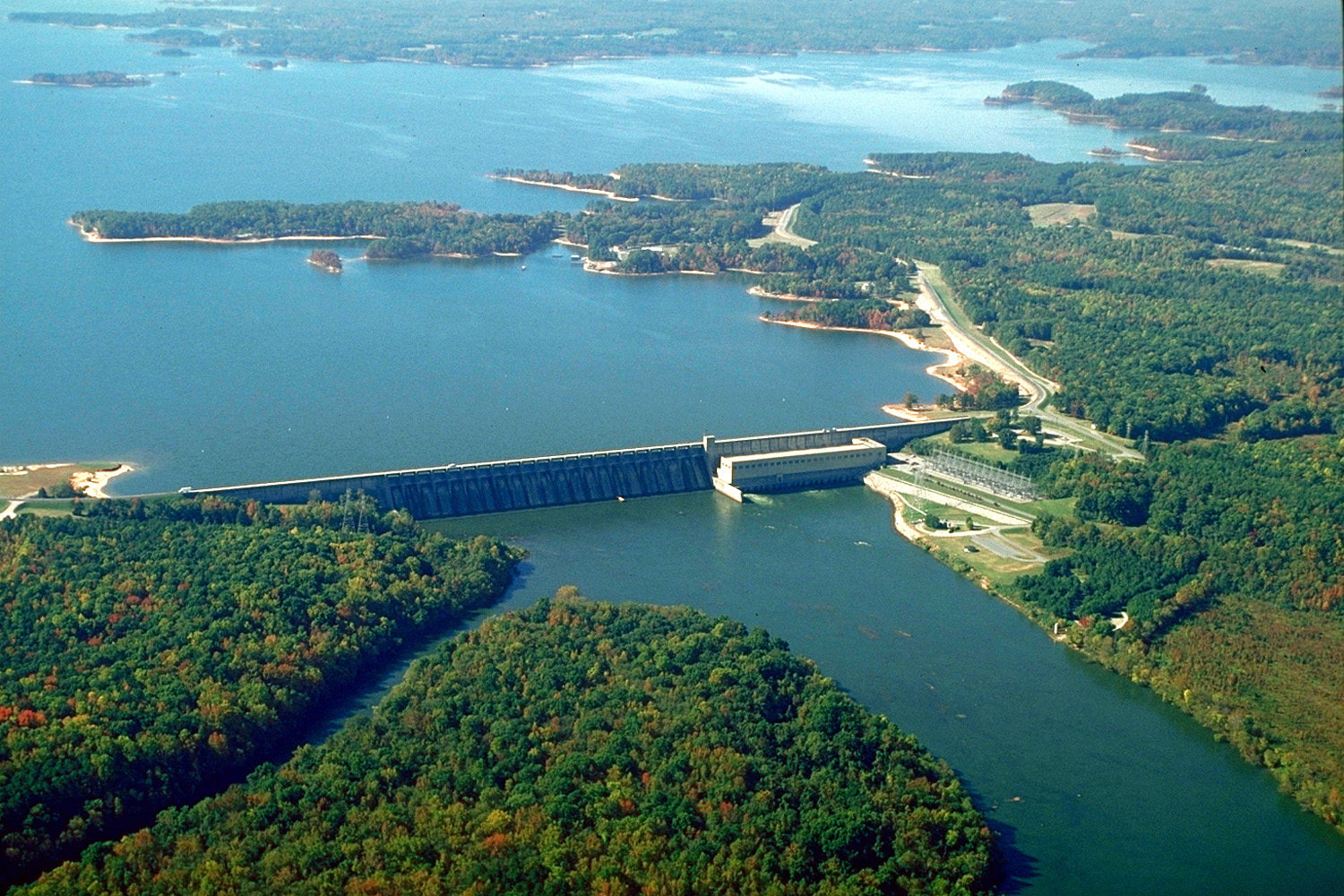
Kerr Lake

According to the U.S. Census Bureau, the county has a total area of 268.69 square miles (695.9 km^{2}), of which 252.40 square miles (653.7 km^{2}) is land and 16.29 square miles (42.2 km^{2}) (6.06%) is water.

=== State and local protected areas ===
- Kerr Lake State Recreation Area (part)
- Vance Game Land

=== Major water bodies ===
- Buffalo Creek
- Fishing Creek
- Flat Creek
- Island Creek Reservoir
- John H. Kerr Reservoir
- Little Nutbush Creek
- Martin Creek
- Nutbush Creek
- Roanoke River
- Ruin Creek
- Sandy Creek
- Tabbs Creek
- Tar River

=== Adjacent counties ===
- Mecklenburg County, Virginia – north
- Warren County – east
- Franklin County – south
- Granville County – west

=== Major highways ===
- I-85
- US 1
- US 1 Bus.
- US 158
- US 158 Bus.
- NC 39

== Demographics ==
Historical population
Census	Pop.	Note	%±
1890	17,581		—
1900	16,684		−5.1%
1910	19,425		16.4%
1920	22,799		17.4%
1930	27,294		19.7%
1940	29,961		9.8%
1950	32,101		7.1%
1960	32,002		−0.3%
1970	32,691		2.2%
1980	36,748		12.4%
1990	38,892		5.8%
2000	42,954		10.4%
2010	45,422		5.7%
2020	42,578		−6.3%
2025 (est.)	42,638	▲	0.1%
U.S. Decennial Census; 1790–1960 1900–1990; 1990–2000 2010 2020

When originally established in 1881, the population of Vance County was approximately 9,000. From 1930 through 1970, the rural county population declined and growth slowed markedly as many blacks migrated to the North for better jobs and other opportunities in the Great Migration. Combined with other economic changes, this resulted in the county losing what had been its large African-American majority by the late 20th century. In the early 21st century, the white and black populations are nearly equal.

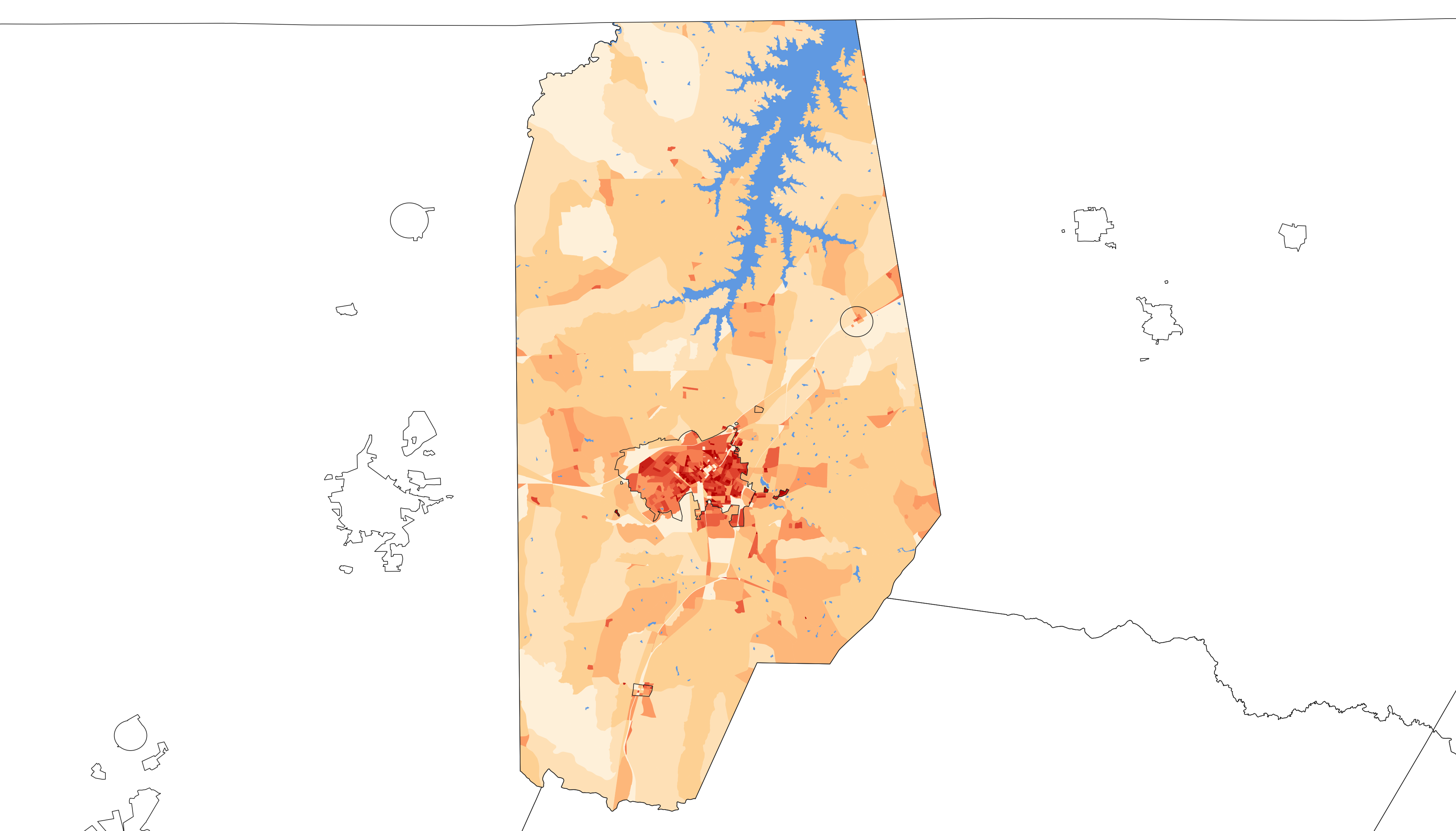
2020 population density of Vance County NC by census block

=== 2020 census ===
As of the 2020 census, the county had a population of 42,578 and a median age of 42.3 years. 22.8% of residents were under the age of 18 and 19.6% of residents were 65 years of age or older. For every 100 females there were 89.2 males, and for every 100 females age 18 and over there were 85.5 males age 18 and over.

The racial makeup of the county was 39.2% White, 49.9% Black or African American, 0.4% American Indian and Alaska Native, 0.7% Asian, <0.1% Native Hawaiian and Pacific Islander, 5.9% from some other race, and 4.0% from two or more races. Hispanic or Latino residents of any race comprised 8.7% of the population.

46.7% of residents lived in urban areas, while 53.3% lived in rural areas.

There were 17,038 households in the county, of which 30.3% had children under the age of 18 living in them. Of all households, 36.6% were married-couple households, 19.3% were households with a male householder and no spouse or partner present, and 37.8% were households with a female householder and no spouse or partner present. About 29.7% of all households were made up of individuals and 14.1% had someone living alone who was 65 years of age or older.

There were 19,276 housing units, of which 11.6% were vacant. Among occupied housing units, 59.0% were owner-occupied and 41.0% were renter-occupied. The homeowner vacancy rate was 1.6% and the rental vacancy rate was 5.8%.

=== Racial and ethnic composition ===
Vance County, North Carolina – Racial and ethnic composition Note: the US Census treats Hispanic/Latino as an ethnic category. This table excludes Latinos from the racial categories and assigns them to a separate category. Hispanics/Latinos may be of any race.
Race / Ethnicity (NH = Non-Hispanic)	Pop 1980	Pop 1990	Pop 2000	Pop 2010	Pop 2020	% 1980	% 1990	% 2000	% 2010	% 2020
White alone (NH)	20,620	21,019	19,894	19,101	16,243	56.11%	54.04%	46.31%	42.05%	38.15%
Black or African American alone (NH)	15,805	17,475	20,604	22,477	21,081	43.01%	44.93%	47.97%	49.48%	49.51%
Native American or Alaska Native alone (NH)	31	67	76	79	91	0.08%	0.17%	0.18%	0.17%	0.21%
Asian alone (NH)	55	58	163	199	284	0.15%	0.15%	0.38%	0.44%	0.67%
Native Hawaiian or Pacific Islander alone (NH)	x	x	9	7	9	x	x	0.02%	0.02%	0.02%
Other race alone (NH)	10	2	19	41	110	0.03%	0.01%	0.04%	0.09%	0.26%
Mixed race or Multiracial (NH)	x	x	232	467	1,043	x	x	0.54%	1.03%	2.45%
Hispanic or Latino (any race)	227	271	1,957	3,051	3,717	0.62%	0.70%	4.56%	6.72%	8.73%
Total	36,748	38,892	42,954	45,422	42,578	100.00%	100.00%	100.00%	100.00%	100.00%

=== 2000 census ===
At the 2000 census, there were 42,954 people, 16,199 households, and 11,647 families residing in the county. The population density was 169 people per square mile (65 people/km^{2}). There were 18,196 housing units at an average density of 72 units per square mile (28 units/km^{2}). The racial makeup of the county was 48.21% White, 48.31% Black or African American, 0.20% Native American, 0.39% Asian, 0.03% Pacific Islander, 2.03% from other races, and 0.84% from two or more races. 4.56% of the population were Hispanic or Latino of any race.

There were 16,199 households, out of which 33.50% had children under the age of 18 living with them, 47.00% were married couples living together, 20.40% had a female householder with no husband present, and 28.10% were non-families. 24.20% of all households were made up of individuals, and 9.90% had someone living alone who was 65 years of age or older. The average household size was 2.60 and the average family size was 3.06.

The county had the highest teen pregnancy rate in the state for the year 2005 as researched by the Adolescent Pregnancy Prevention Coalition of North Carolina. The rate was 110.4 per 1000 teens, significantly above the state average of 61.7 per 1000 teens.

In the county, the population was spread out, with 27.10% under the age of 18, 8.90% from 18 to 24, 28.80% from 25 to 44, 22.60% from 45 to 64, and 12.60% who were 65 years of age or older. The median age was 35 years. For every 100 females there were 89.70 males. For every 100 females age 18 and over, there were 84.30 males.

The median income for a household in the county was $31,301, and the median income for a family was $36,389. Males had a median income of $28,284 versus $21,433 for females. The per capita income for the county was $15,897. About 16.30% of families and 20.50% of the population were below the poverty line, including 27.70% of those under age 18 and 19.30% of those age 65 or over.

== Government and politics ==
Vance County is governed by a seven-member board of Commissioners, who appoint a county manager Vance County is a member of the Kerr-Tar Regional Council of Governments.

United States presidential election results for Vance County, North Carolina
Year	Republican		Democratic		Third party(ies)	
Year	No.	%	No.	%	No.	%
1912	168	10.46%	1,204	74.97%	234	14.57%
1916	558	27.78%	1,451	72.22%	0	0.00%
1920	816	24.90%	2,461	75.10%	0	0.00%
1924	470	18.77%	2,013	80.39%	21	0.84%
1928	1,449	37.70%	2,395	62.30%	0	0.00%
1932	318	7.64%	3,833	92.03%	14	0.34%
1936	315	6.49%	4,536	93.51%	0	0.00%
1940	380	8.20%	4,252	91.80%	0	0.00%
1944	528	11.38%	4,110	88.62%	0	0.00%
1948	549	11.87%	3,679	79.51%	399	8.62%
1952	1,721	23.20%	5,697	76.80%	0	0.00%
1956	1,955	28.43%	4,922	71.57%	0	0.00%
1960	2,012	26.11%	5,694	73.89%	0	0.00%
1964	3,452	39.96%	5,186	60.04%	0	0.00%
1968	2,252	19.84%	3,852	33.94%	5,244	46.21%
1972	6,491	66.85%	3,117	32.10%	102	1.05%
1976	3,813	40.30%	5,620	59.40%	28	0.30%
1980	4,217	43.15%	5,415	55.40%	142	1.45%
1984	6,836	53.68%	5,880	46.18%	18	0.14%
1988	5,625	49.88%	5,631	49.94%	20	0.18%
1992	4,747	37.09%	6,598	51.55%	1,455	11.37%
1996	4,651	39.97%	6,385	54.88%	599	5.15%
2000	5,564	43.81%	7,092	55.84%	45	0.35%
2004	6,884	43.91%	8,762	55.89%	31	0.20%
2008	7,606	36.44%	13,166	63.08%	99	0.47%
2012	7,429	35.62%	13,323	63.89%	102	0.49%
2016	7,332	36.70%	12,229	61.22%	416	2.08%
2020	8,391	39.96%	12,431	59.20%	177	0.84%
2024	8,614	42.87%	11,292	56.20%	186	0.93%

== Education ==
- Vance County Schools
- Henderson Collegiate (public charter school, opened in the Summer of 2010)
- Vance Charter School
- Kerr-Vance Academy (founded in 1968)
- Crossroads Christian School
- Victory Christian Academy
- Vance-Granville Community College

=== Historical schools ===
- Henderson Male Academy (whites only)
- Henderson Female Academy (whites only)
- Kittrell College, It was established as Kittrell Industrial Normal School for black males by the North Carolina General Assembly on March 7, 1787. It was renamed Kittrell Normal and Industrial Institute on January 30, 1889. It was renamed Kittrell College in 1901. It was closed in 1931 and then reopened from 1934 to 1948. It was operated as a high school from 1953 to 1965 and college from 1953 to 1975 when it was permanently closed.
- Middleburg Male Academy (also called Middleburg School, whites only, founded by Albert Anderson in the late 1800s)
- Townesville School (whites only)
- West End School

== Communities ==
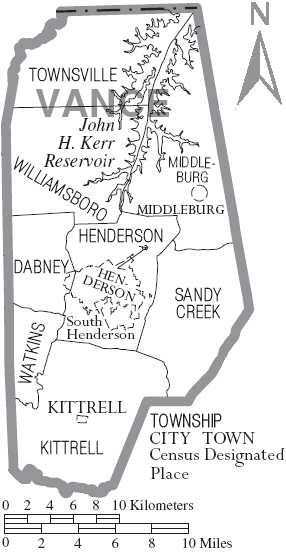
Map of Vance County with municipal and township labels

=== City ===
- Henderson (county seat and largest community. Area was first settled in the early 1700s, founded in 1841 in Granville County, first post office September 28, 1838)

=== Towns ===
- Kittrell (founded in 1885, formerly Kittrell's Depot, Linbank, and Stauton in Granville County)
- Middleburg (formerly Middleburgh, Warren County)

=== Townships ===
By the requirements of the North Carolina Constitution of 1868, counties were to be divided into townships, which were solely administrative divisions of the county. The following township make up Vance County:

- Dabney
- Henderson
- Kittrell
- Middleburg
- Sandy Creek
- Townsville
- Watkins
- Williamsboro

=== Census-designated place ===
- South Henderson

=== Unincorporated communities ===
- Adcock Crossroads
- Dabney
- Epsom (also in Franklin County, post office opened on 27 Sep 1887 and discontinued on 31 Mar 1908)
- Townsville (post office opened on 4 Apr 1855 in Granville County; originally Lynesville; changed to Vance County in 1881)
- Watkins (post office opened on 17 Sep 1889 and discontinued on 31 Aug 1906)
- Weldons Mill
- Westwood Hills
- Williamsboro (post office opened on 14 May 1879 and discontinued on 15 Feb 1909, Williamsboro since 1897, formerly Williamsborough in Granville County from about 1755, formerly Lick, formerly Nutbush)
- Willow Oaks
- Woodworth (established about 1830, post office opened on 29 Mar 1880 and discontinued on 16 Feb 1914)

=== Former communities ===
The unincorporated communities in Vance County have included

- Bearpond (post office discontinued in 1903)
- Bobbitt (post office discontinued in 1907)
- Brookston (post office discontinued in 1906, formerly Warren County)
- Carlton (post office discontinued in 1905)
- Cokesbury (also Cokes, post office discontinued in 1905
- Gillburg (post office discontinued in 1906)
- Greystone (formerly Strickland, post office discontinued in 1932)
- Steedsville (post office discontinued in 1894)
- Tungsten (post office discontinued in 1959)

== Notable people ==
- Henry P. Cheatham (1857–1935), one of only five African Americans elected to Congress from the South in the Jim Crow era
- Ben E. King (1938–2015), singer/musician
- Duke Buchan (born 1963), American Ambassador and businessman

== See also ==
- List of counties in North Carolina
- National Register of Historic Places listings in Vance County, North Carolina
