= Jacob W. Holt =

American architect

Jacob W. Holt (March 30, 1811 – September 21, 1880) was an American carpenter and builder-architect in Warrenton, North Carolina. Some twenty or more buildings are known to have been built by him or are attributed to him and his workshop by local tradition or their distinctive style. Some of his work includes among others Long Grass Plantation, Eureka near Baskerville, Virginia; Shadow Lawn at Chase City, Virginia; buildings at Peace College; Vine Hill near Centerville, North Carolina; Dr. Samuel Perry House near Gupton, North Carolina; the Archibald Taylor House near Wood, North Carolina; Salem Methodist Church near Huntsboro, North Carolina; Hebron Methodist Church in Warren County, North Carolina; and the John Watson House and possibly the house known as Annefield (Saxe, Virginia) in Charlotte County, Virginia, and Belvidere and Pool Rock Plantation near Williamsboro, North Carolina. He may have also built the Forestville Baptist Church at Forestville, North Carolina.

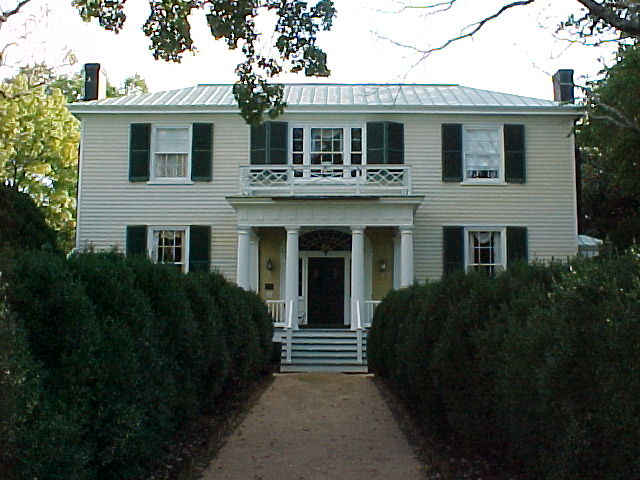
The front view of Long Grass Plantation with the additions by Jacob W. Holt.

Jacob W. Holt was born March 30, 1811, in Prince Edward County, Virginia, to David Holt (a carpenter) and Elizabeth McGehee of Prince Edward County, Virginia. By the time Jacob was in his middle teens, both parents had died, leaving him and his three siblings in the care of their uncle John MeGehee. It is thought that Jacob and his brother Thomas apprenticed with area carpenter William A. Howard during this time. In 1838, Jacob married Aurelia Phillips, and two years later, was documented as controlling the largest non-farming cadre of laborers in the county, with nineteen free men and twenty nine male slaves. Despite his apparently large, if not successful, business, few examples of his Prince Edward County work are documented. Holt and a large group of other Prince Edward County craftsmen emigrated to Warrenton, North Carolina during the early 1840s. Warren was the wealthiest county in North Carolina, and Warrenton, which was home to approximately 1,000 residents, proved fertile ground for these craftsmen to prosper.

By 1845, Holt was in business with two Prince Edward brickmasons and plasterers, Edward T. Rice and Francis Woodson. Four years later, Jacob’s younger brother, Thomas, who had previously lived in Lunenburg County, Virginia, joined him in Warrenton. The 1850 Census lists Holt with forty-two slaves and seventeen free whites in his employ. At first, Holt’s buildings spoke the Greek Revival architectural language that was common to the region, but by the 1850s, he was producing buildings in what Catherine Bishir termed a more “eclectic Italianate style.” Bishir noted that Holt’s “bold, personalized style appealed to the region’s thriving planters and merchants.” By 1860, Holt had completed scores of residential and institutional buildings in Virginia and North Carolina, and a writer for the North Carolina Weekly Standard wrote that Holt was “one of the first architects in the state… …he has put up many fine residences and public buildings in the eastern part of the state.” In 1869, Holt moved to the Mecklenburg County, Virginia town that would later be renamed Chase City, and immediately began constructing a pair of houses for Pennsylvania developers John E. Boyd and George Endley. In 1870, the Mecklenburg Herald reported that Holt, “master carpenter and genius,” was “turning things upside down in Boydton.” It continued, “we are satisfied that he can and does do more work than one can hire the labor by the day, and have it executed….Yes, give us plenty of mechanics, and we will make Boydton and Mecklenburg County look like a new country. See what Mr. Holt and his brawny armed assistants have done for Christiansville [Chase City].” By the mid-1870s, Holt built some of his most elaborate buildings in Murfreesboro, North Carolina. He died on September 21, 1880, in Keysville, Virginia, leaving two sons, three grandsons, and a number of former employees in the building trade.
