= Samuel Foote (disambiguation) =

Samuel Foote (1720–1777) was a British dramatist, actor and theatre manager from Cornwall.

Samuel Foote (or Foot) may refer to:

- Samuel J. Foote (1873–1936), lawyer and political figure in Newfoundland
- Samuel A. Foot (1780–1846), politician from Connecticut
- Samuel A. Foote (Judge) (1790–1878), from New York
- Samuel Foote (writer), founder of the Semi-Colon Club in Cincinnati, Ohio
