= Shadow Lawn =

Shadow Lawn may refer to:

- Shadow Lawn (New Jersey), at Monmouth University
- Shadow Lawn (Lincolnton, North Carolina)
- Shadow Lawn (Chase City, Virginia)

== See also ==
- Shadow Lawn Historic District (Austin, Texas)
- Shadowlawn Historic District (Memphis, Tennessee), listed on the National Register of Historic Places in Shelby County, Tennessee
