= Ourdan =

Ourdan is a surname. Notable people with the surname include:

- Joseph Prosper Ourdan (1828–1881), American engraver
- Rémy Ourdan (fl. 2001–2022), French journalist, war correspondent and documentary filmmaker
