= Pool Rock Plantation =

Historic house in North Carolina, United States

- U.S. National Register of Historic Places
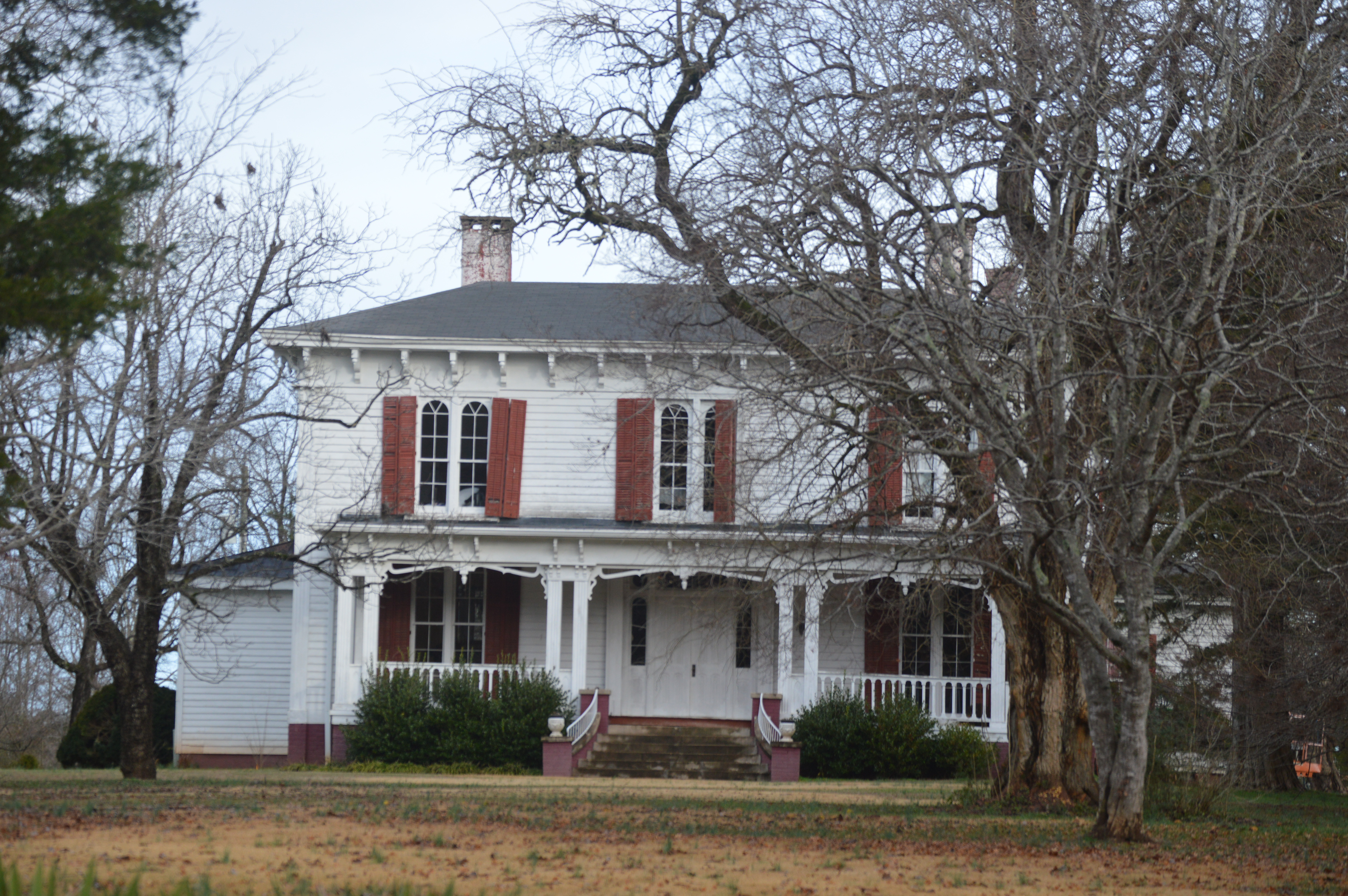
- Front of the house

- Location within North Carolina Location within the United States
- Location: Northeast of Williamsboro, North Carolina on SR 1380
- Coordinates: 36°27′17″N 78°25′4″W
- Area: 4.5 acres (1.8 ha)
- Built: c. 1827, c. 1855
- Built by: Jacob W. Holt
- Architectural style: Italianate, Federal
- NRHP reference No.: 78001977
- Added to NRHP: November 29, 1978

Pool Rock Plantation is a historic plantation house located near Williamsboro, Vance County, North Carolina. It consists of two, two-story sections. The older was built in 1757 by James Mitchell, an immigrant from Lunenburg County, Virginia. His daughter, Amy Mitchell, married Michael Satterwhite in the house in 1759. It is a two-story, three-bay, Federal style frame structure. It forms the rear section. About 1855, a more ornate two-story, three-bay, Italianate style frame structure attributed to Jacob W. Holt (1811–1880). The later section has a shallow hipped roof and overhanging eaves. The two sections are joined by a two-story hallway linker. Also on the property is a contributing one-story, hip roof office building.

It was listed on the National Register of Historic Places in 1971.
