= Jones v. Van Zandt =

- Supreme Court of the United States

Decided March 5, 1847
- Full case name: Wharton Jones v. John Van Zandt
- Citations: 46 U.S. 215 (more) 5 How. 215; 12 L. Ed. 122

Holding
- The Fugitive Slave Act of 1793 was constitutional, and the institution of slavery remained a matter for individual states to decide.

Court membership
- Chief Justice Roger B. Taney Associate Justices John McLean · James M. Wayne; John Catron · John McKinley; Peter V. Daniel · Samuel Nelson; Levi Woodbury · Robert C. Grier

Case opinion
- Majority: Woodbury, joined by unanimous
- Abrogated by
- U.S. Const. amend. XIII, XIV

Jones v. Van Zandt, 46 U.S. (5 How.) 215 (1847), was a landmark United States Supreme Court decision involving the constitutionality of slavery that was a predecessor of Dred Scott v. Sandford. The Supreme Court was then led by Chief Justice Roger Taney, who owned slaves and wrote the Dred Scott decision but not Jones. The Court unanimously reached the decision that the Fugitive Slave Act of 1793 was constitutional and that the institution of slavery remained a matter for individual states to decide.

== Background ==
John Van Zandt was an abolitionist who aided the Underground Railroad resistance movement in Ohio after he had been a slaveholder in Kentucky. At about three on Sunday morning, two white men on horseback stopped a wagon with a closed cover being driven by a black man. The wagon belonged to Van Zandt, who got out and tried to free the reins. Inside were several black people. The driver and a 30-year-old black man, named Andrew, escaped, but the slavecatchers took the wagon with the rest to a jail in Covington, Kentucky, across the Ohio River and about 10 miles from the stop.

Wharton Jones owned Andrew and eight other slaves in Boone County, Kentucky, about 12 or 14 miles from the stop. He sued Zandt in federal court in Ohio for violating the Fugitive Slave Act of 1793 by aiding the escaping slaves. Justice John McLean, riding circuit, conducted the jury trial. Salmon P. Chase and Bell unsuccessfully defended Van Zandt, with the jury deciding in Jones's favor.

Van Zandt appealed through his attorneys, including William H. Seward. Abolitionists used Van Zandt's Supreme Court appeal as a vehicle to reach the underlying constitutional question, since Ohio had been a free state since the Northwest Ordinance, even before its statehood. Van Zandt argued unsuccessfully that he was only giving a ride to black people walking on an Ohio road and that law of Ohio presumed all people were free. During the trial, however, witnesses stated that Van Zandt said that he knew that they were escaped slaves but thought that they ought to be free.

== Decision ==
Justice Levi Woodbury, who did not own slaves, announced the unanimous decision of the court. No formal notice of fugitive status was required before apprehension since the circumstances showed both notice and concealment. The constitutionality of the Fugitive Slave Act had been established by Justice Joseph Story in Prigg v. Pennsylvania.

The historian Paul Finkelman believes that the decision laid the groundwork for Dred Scott v. Sandford by putting whites on notice that any black person might be a slave and finding that no black person had any rights under the U.S. Constitution.
