= List of United States Supreme Court cases, volume 46 =

Supreme Court of the United States
- Interactive map of Supreme Court of the United States
- 38°53′26″N 77°00′16″W
- Established: March 4, 1789; 236 years ago
- Location: Washington, D.C.
- Coordinates: 38°53′26″N 77°00′16″W
- Composition method: Presidential nomination with Senate confirmation
- Authorised by: Constitution of the United States, Art. III, § 1
- Judge term length: life tenure, subject to impeachment and removal
- Number of positions: 9 (by statute)
- Website: supremecourt.gov

This is a list of cases reported in volume 46 (5 How.) of United States Reports, decided by the Supreme Court of the United States in 1846 and 1847.

== Nominative reports ==
In 1874, the U.S. government created the United States Reports, and retroactively numbered older privately-published case reports as part of the new series. As a result, cases appearing in volumes 1–90 of U.S. Reports have dual citation forms; one for the volume number of U.S. Reports, and one for the volume number of the reports named for the relevant reporter of decisions (these are called "nominative reports").

=== Benjamin Chew Howard ===
Starting with the 42nd volume of U.S. Reports, the Reporter of Decisions of the Supreme Court of the United States was Benjamin Chew Howard. Howard was Reporter of Decisions from 1843 to 1860, covering volumes 42 through 65 of United States Reports which correspond to volumes 1 through 24 of his Howard's Reports. As such, the dual form of citation to, for example, Mayberry v. Thompson is 46 U.S. (5 How.) 121 (1847).

== Justices of the Supreme Court at the time of 46 U.S. (5 How.) ==
The Supreme Court is established by Article III, Section 1 of the Constitution of the United States, which says: "The judicial Power of the United States, shall be vested in one supreme Court . . .". The size of the Court is not specified; the Constitution leaves it to Congress to set the number of justices. Under the Judiciary Act of 1789 Congress originally fixed the number of justices at six (one chief justice and five associate justices). Since 1789 Congress has varied the size of the Court from six to seven, nine, ten, and back to nine justices (always including one chief justice).

When the cases in 46 U.S. (5 How.) were decided the Court comprised these nine members:

Portrait	Justice	Office	Home State	Succeeded	Date confirmed by the Senate (Vote)	Tenure on Supreme Court
	Roger B. Taney	Chief Justice	Maryland	John Marshall	March 15, 1836 (29–15)	March 28, 1836 – October 12, 1864 (Died)
	John McLean	Associate Justice	Ohio	Robert Trimble	March 7, 1829 (Acclamation)	January 11, 1830 – April 4, 1861 (Died)
	James Moore Wayne	Associate Justice	Georgia	William Johnson	January 9, 1835 (Acclamation)	January 14, 1835 – July 5, 1867 (Died)
	John Catron	Associate Justice	Tennessee	newly created seat	March 8, 1837 (28–15)	May 1, 1837 – May 30, 1865 (Died)
	John McKinley	Associate Justice	Alabama	newly created seat	September 25, 1837 (Acclamation)	January 9, 1838 – July 19, 1852 (Died)
	Peter Vivian Daniel	Associate Justice	Virginia	Philip P. Barbour	March 2, 1841 (25–5)	January 10, 1842 – May 31, 1860 (Died)
	Samuel Nelson	Associate Justice	New York	Smith Thompson	February 14, 1845 (Acclamation)	February 27, 1845 – November 28, 1872 (Retired)
	Levi Woodbury	Associate Justice	New Hampshire	Joseph Story	January 31, 1846 (Acclamation)	September 23, 1845 – September 4, 1851 (Died)
	Robert Cooper Grier	Associate Justice	Pennsylvania	Henry Baldwin	August 4, 1846 (Acclamation)	August 10, 1846 – January 31, 1870 (Retired)

== Notable Case in 46 U.S. (5 How.) ==
=== Jones v. Van Zandt ===
In Jones v. Van Zandt, 46 U.S. (5 How.) 215 (1847), the Supreme Court held that no written or other formal notice of fugitive slave status was required to support a criminal charge of harbouring or concealing a runaway slave who had escaped to a free state.

== Citation style ==
Under the Judiciary Act of 1789 the federal court structure at the time comprised District Courts, which had general trial jurisdiction; Circuit Courts, which had mixed trial and appellate (from the US District Courts) jurisdiction; and the United States Supreme Court, which had appellate jurisdiction over the federal District and Circuit courts—and for certain issues over state courts. The Supreme Court also had limited original jurisdiction (i.e., in which cases could be filed directly with the Supreme Court without first having been heard by a lower federal or state court). There were one or more federal District Courts and/or Circuit Courts in each state, territory, or other geographical region.

Bluebook citation style is used for case names, citations, and jurisdictions.

- "C.C.D." = United States Circuit Court for the District of . . .
  - e.g.,"C.C.D.N.J." = United States Circuit Court for the District of New Jersey
- "D." = United States District Court for the District of . . .
  - e.g.,"D. Mass." = United States District Court for the District of Massachusetts
- "E." = Eastern; "M." = Middle; "N." = Northern; "S." = Southern; "W." = Western
  - e.g.,"C.C.S.D.N.Y." = United States Circuit Court for the Southern District of New York
  - e.g.,"M.D. Ala." = United States District Court for the Middle District of Alabama
- "Ct. Cl." = United States Court of Claims
- The abbreviation of a state's name alone indicates the highest appellate court in that state's judiciary at the time.
  - e.g.,"Pa." = Supreme Court of Pennsylvania
  - e.g.,"Me." = Supreme Judicial Court of Maine

== List of cases in 46 U.S. (5 How.) ==
Case Name	Page and year	Opinion of the Court	Concurring opinion(s)	Dissenting opinion(s)	Lower court	Disposition of case
Wood v. Underhill	1 (1846)	Taney	none	none	C.C.S.D.N.Y.	reversed
Sewall v. Chamberlain	6 (1847)	Wayne	none	none	C.C.S.D. Ala.	dismissed
Dick and Company v. Runnels	7 (1846)	McLean	none	none	C.C.S.D. Miss.	certification
United States v. Lawton	10 (1847)	Catron	none	none	Fla. Super. Ct.	reversed
United States v. Boyd	29 (1846)	Nelson	none	none	C.C.S.D. Miss.	reversed
Pepper v. Dunlap	51 (1846)	Taney	none	none	La.	dismissed
McAfee v. Doremus	53 (1847)	McLean	none	none	N.D. Miss.	affirmed
Walker v. Taylor	64 (1846)	Grier	none	none	Ky.	dismissed
Hildeburn v. Turner	69 (1847)	Taney	none	none	C.C.S.D. Miss.	certification
Miller v. Herbert	72 (1847)	Daniel	none	none	C.C.D.C.	reversed
Alexandria Canal Company v. Swann	83 (1847)	Taney	none	none	C.C.D.C.	affirmed
Bridges v. Armour	91 (1847)	Nelson	none	none	N.D. Miss.	reversed
Hall v. Smith	96 (1847)	Wayne	none	none	C.C.D. Md.	certification
Barry v. Mercein	103 (1847)	Taney	none	none	C.C.S.D.N.Y.	dismissed
Mayberry v. Thompson	121 (1847)	Taney	none	none	C.C.S.D. Ala.	dismissed
Nelson v. Hill	127 (1847)	Daniel	none	none	C.C.S.D. Ala.	reversed
Rowan v. Runnels	134 (1847)	Taney	none	Daniel	C.C.S.D. Miss.	reversed
Truly v. Wanzer	141 (1847)	Grier	none	none	C.C.S.D. Miss.	affirmed
Ford v. Douglas	143 (1847)	Nelson	none	none	C.C.E.D. La.	reversed
Gear v. Parish	168 (1847)	Nelson	none	none	Sup. Ct. Terr. Wis.	reversed
In re Metzger	176 (1847)	McLean	none	none	original	habeas corpus denied
Creath's Administrator v. Sims	192 (1847)	Daniel	none	none	C.C.S.D. Miss.	affirmed
United States v. Briggs	208 (1847)	Taney	none	none	C.C.D. Mich.	certification
Sheppard v. Wilson	210 (1847)	Taney	none	none	Sup. Ct. Terr. Iowa	dismissal denied
Miners' Bank v. United States ex rel. Grant	213 (1847)	Taney	none	none	Sup. Ct. Terr. Iowa	dismissed
Jones v. Van Zandt	215 (1847)	Woodbury	none	none	C.C.D. Ohio	certification
Taylor v. Benham	233 (1847)	Woodbury	none	none	N.D. Ala.	affirmed
Phillips v. Preston	278 (1846)	Woodbury	none	none	C.C.E.D. La.	continued
Cook v. Moffat	295 (1847)	Grier	Taney, McLean, Daniel, Woodbury	none	C.C.D. Md.	affirmed
Innerarity v. Byrne	295 (1847)	McLean	none	none	not indicated	continued
Commercial Bank v. Buckingham's Executors	317 (1847)	Grier	none	none	Ohio	dismissed
Scott v. Jones	343 (1847)	Woodbury	Wayne	McLean	Mich.	dismissed
United States v. Second Bank of the United States	382 (1847)	Catron	none	McLean	C.C.E.D. Pa.	reversed
Fox v. Ohio	410 (1847)	Daniel	none	McLean	Ohio	affirmed
Waring v. Clarke	441 (1847)	Wayne	none	Catron, Woodbury, Grier	C.C.E.D. La.	reversed
License Cases	504 (1847)	Taney	Catron, Daniel, Grier, McLean, Woodbury	none	multiple	affirmed

== See also ==
- Certificate of division
