= Hebron Methodist Church =

Historic church in North Carolina, United States

- U.S. National Register of Historic Places
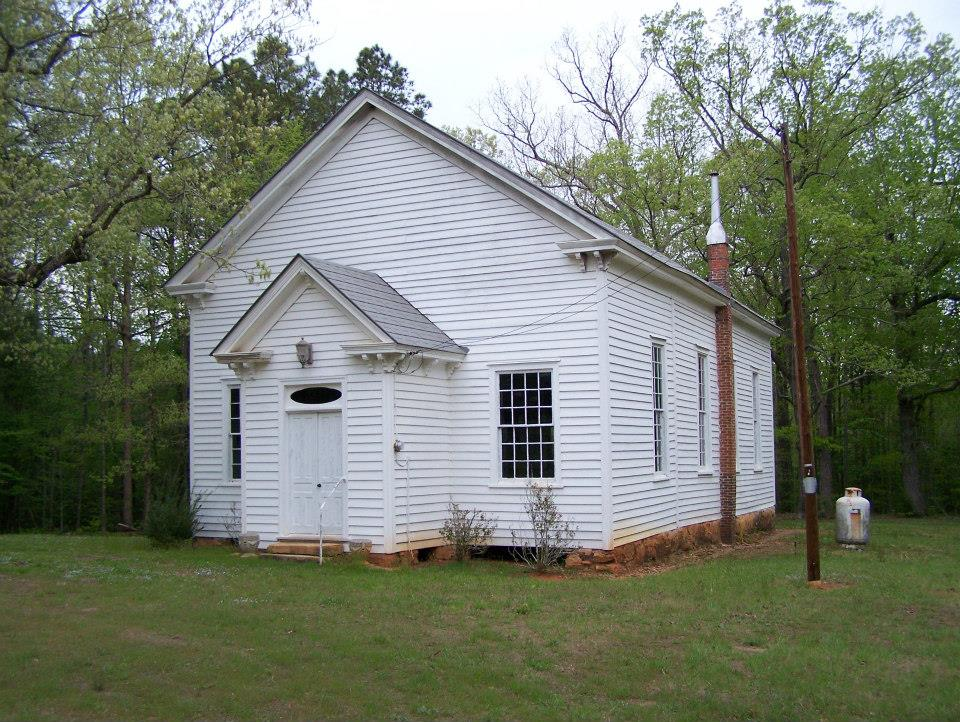

- Location within North Carolina Location within the United States
- Location: SR 1306, near Oakville, North Carolina
- Coordinates: 36°30′31″N 78°5′2″W
- Area: 4.3 acres (1.7 ha)
- Built: 1848
- Built by: Holt, Jacob
- Architectural style: Greek Revival
- NRHP reference No.: 84002547
- Added to NRHP: April 19, 1984

Hebron Methodist Church is a historic Methodist church located near Oakville, Warren County, North Carolina. It was built about 1848–1849, and is a one-story, three bay by three bay, Greek Revival style frame church. It has a gable roof and rests on a stone foundation. It was enlarged in 1886. The building is attributed to local builder Jacob W. Holt (1811-1880).

It was added to the National Register of Historic Places in 1984.
