= Salmon P. Chase =

Chief Justice of the United States from 1864 to 1873

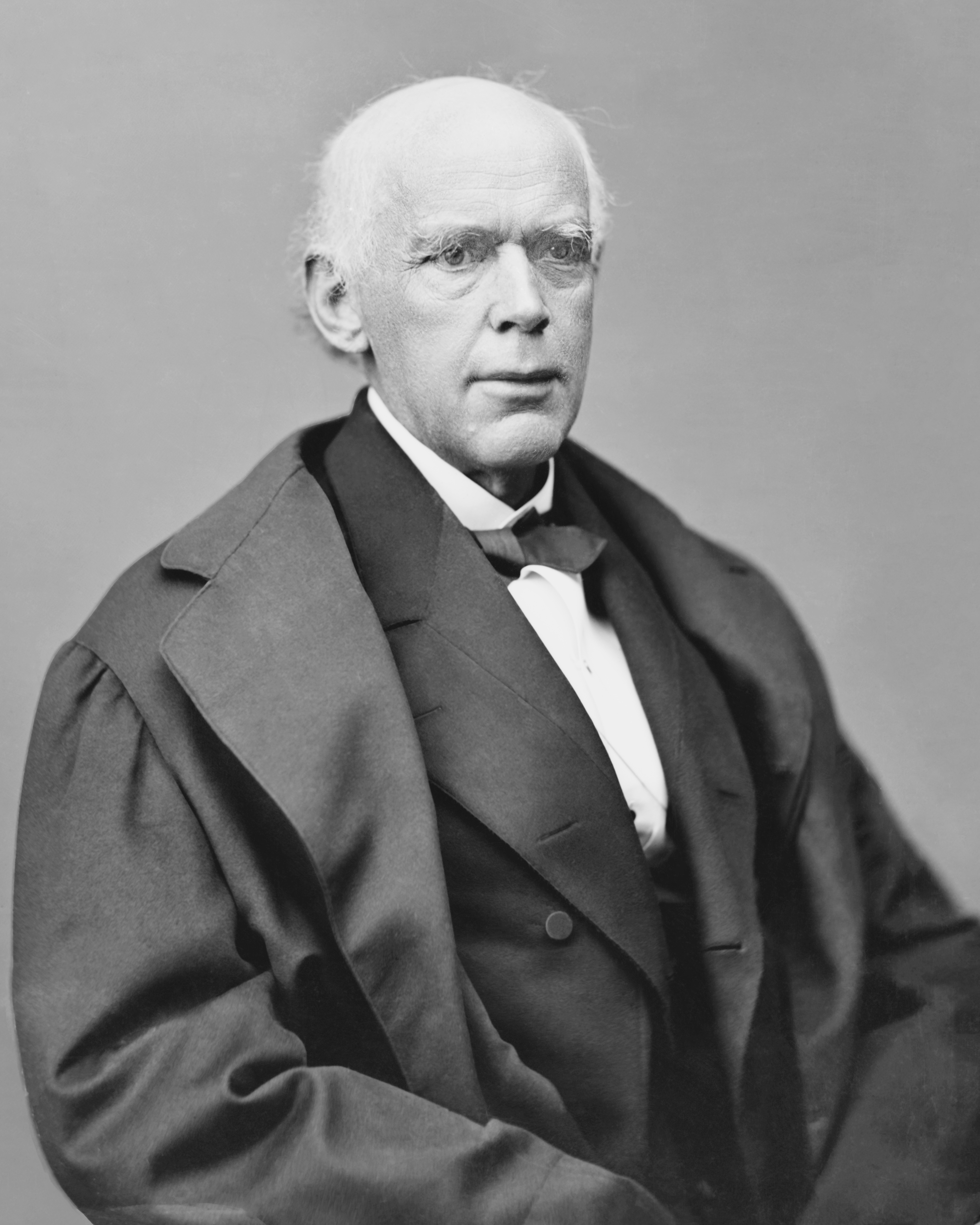
- Portrait by Mathew Brady c. 1870

6th Chief Justice of the United States
- In office December 15, 1864 – May 7, 1873
- Nominated by: Abraham Lincoln
- Preceded by: Roger B. Taney
- Succeeded by: Morrison Waite

25th United States Secretary of the Treasury
- In office March 7, 1861 – June 30, 1864
- President: Abraham Lincoln
- Preceded by: John Adams Dix
- Succeeded by: William P. Fessenden

United States Senator from Ohio
- In office March 4, 1861 – March 6, 1861
- Preceded by: George Pugh
- Succeeded by: John Sherman
- In office March 4, 1849 – March 3, 1855
- Preceded by: William Allen
- Succeeded by: George Pugh

23rd Governor of Ohio
- In office January 14, 1856 – January 9, 1860
- Lieutenant: Thomas Ford; Martin Welker
- Preceded by: William Medill
- Succeeded by: William Dennison

Personal details
- Born: Salmon Portland Chase; January 13, 1808 Cornish, New Hampshire, U.S.
- Died: May 7, 1873 (aged 65) New York City, U.S.
- Resting place: Spring Grove Cemetery
- Party: Whig (before 1841); Liberty (1841–1848); Free Soil (1848–1854); Republican (1854–1868); Democratic (1868–1872); Liberal Republican (1872–1873)
- Spouses: Katherine Jane Garniss (m. 1834; died 1835); Eliza Ann Smith (m. 1839, died); Sarah Bella Dunlop Ludlow (died)
- Children: Kate and Janette ("Nettie")
- Relatives: Chase family
- Education: Dartmouth College (BA)

Salmon Portland Chase (January 13, 1808 – May 7, 1873) was an American politician and jurist who served as the sixth chief justice of the United States from 1864 to his death in 1873. Earlier, he had served as the 25th United States Secretary of the Treasury in the Abraham Lincoln administration from 1861 to 1864, during the American Civil War. Chase also served as the 23rd Governor of Ohio from 1856 to 1860, and represented Ohio in the United States Senate from 1849 to 1855 and again in 1861. Chase is therefore one of the few American politicians who have held constitutional office in all three branches of the federal government, in addition to serving in the highest state-level office. From the 1850s onward, even as Chief Justice, Chase unsuccessfully sought a presidential nomination.

Born in Cornish, New Hampshire, Chase studied law under Attorney General William Wirt before establishing a legal practice in Cincinnati. He became an anti-slavery activist and frequently defended fugitive slaves in court. Chase left the Whig Party in 1841 to become the leader of Ohio's Liberty Party. In 1848, he helped establish the Free Soil Party and recruited former President Martin Van Buren to serve as the party's presidential nominee. Chase won election to the Senate the following year, and he opposed the Compromise of 1850 and the Kansas–Nebraska Act. In the aftermath of the Kansas–Nebraska Act, Chase helped establish the Republican Party, which opposed the extension of slavery into the territories. After leaving the Senate, Chase served as the first Republican governor of Ohio from 1856 to 1860.

Chase sought the Republican nomination for president in the 1860 presidential election, but the party chose Abraham Lincoln at its National Convention. After Lincoln won the election, he asked Chase to serve as Secretary of the Treasury. Chase served in that position from 1861 to 1864, working hard to ensure the Union was well-financed during the Civil War.

Chase resigned from the Cabinet in June 1864, but retained support among the Radical Republicans and unsuccessfully sought the presidential nomination again for the 1864 election. Partly to appease the Radical Republicans, Lincoln nominated Chase to fill the Supreme Court vacancy that arose following Roger Taney's death.

Chase served as Chief Justice from 1864 to his death in 1873. He presided over the Senate trial of President Andrew Johnson during the impeachment proceedings of 1868. Despite his nomination to the court, Chase continued to pursue the presidency. He unsuccessfully sought the Democratic presidential nomination in 1868 and the Liberal Republican nomination in 1872.

== Early life and family ==
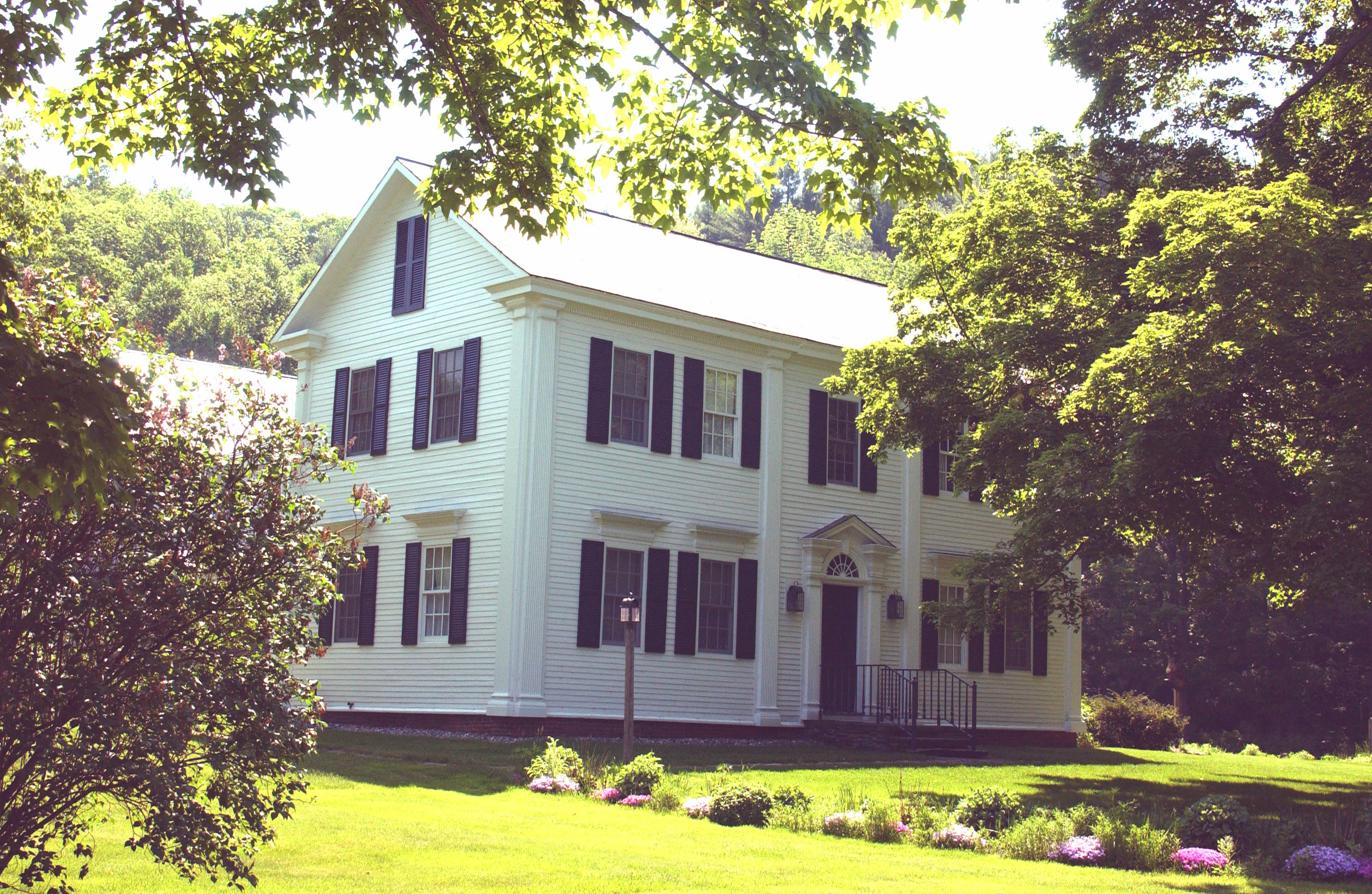
The Salmon P. Chase Birthplace in Cornish, New Hampshire

Salmon Portland Chase was born in Cornish, New Hampshire, on January 13, 1808, to Janette Ralston and Ithamar Chase, who died in 1817 when Salmon was nine years old. His paternal immigrant ancestor was Aquila Chase from Cornwall, England, a ship-master who settled in Newbury, Massachusetts, about 1640, while his maternal grandparents Alexander Ralston and Janette Balloch were Scottish, originally from Falkirk. His mother was left with ten children and few resources, and so Salmon lived from 1820 to 1824 in Ohio with his uncle, Bishop Philander Chase, a leading figure in the Protestant Episcopal Church in the West and the founder of Kenyon College. U.S. Senator Dudley Chase of Vermont was another uncle.

He studied in the common schools of Windsor, Vermont, and Worthington, Ohio, and at Cincinnati College before entering the junior class at Dartmouth College. He was a member of Phi Beta Kappa and graduated from Dartmouth with distinction in 1826. Later in life, he became a member of the Alpha Delta Phi fraternity, through his law partner Samuel Eells. While at Dartmouth, he taught at the Royalton Academy in Royalton, Vermont. Chase then moved to the District of Columbia, where he opened a classical school while reading law under U.S. Attorney General William Wirt. He was admitted to the bar in 1829.

Chase married his first wife, Katherine Jane Garniss, on March 4, 1834. She died the following year after giving birth to their daughter, who died a few years later. He married his second wife, Eliza Ann Smith, on September 26, 1839. Their daughter, Kate Chase, was born in 1840. Eliza died from consumption when Kate was five years old. Chase's third wife, Sarah Bella Dunlop Ludlow, also died from consumption. After her death, he did not remarry.

The Salmon P. Chase Birthplace and childhood home still stands in Cornish, New Hampshire, and is currently a bed and breakfast, the Chase House Inn.

== Legal and political career ==
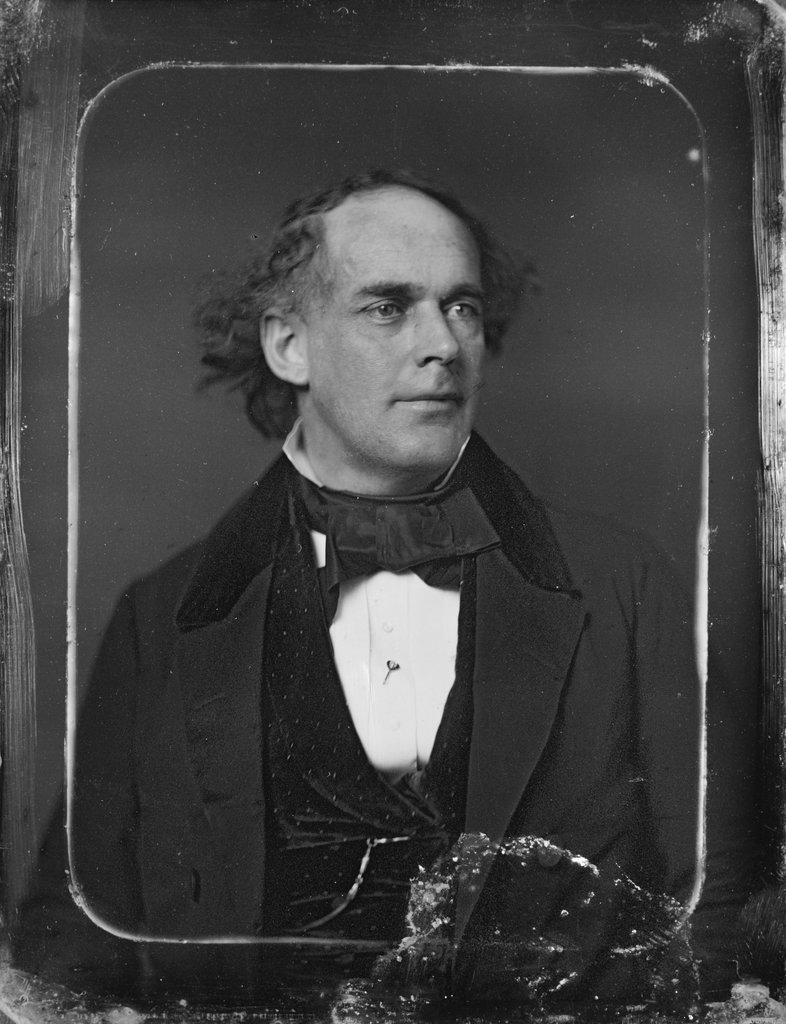
Salmon Portland Chase c. 1850–1855

Chase moved to a country home near Loveland, Ohio, and practiced law in Cincinnati from 1830. He rose to prominence for his authoritative compilation of the state's statutes, which long remained the standard work on the topic.

From the beginning, despite the risk to his livelihood, he defended people who had escaped slavery and those who were tried for assisting them, notably in the Matilda Case in 1837. He became particularly devoted to the abolition of slavery after the death of his first wife, Katherine Jane Garniss, in 1835, shortly after their March 1834 wedding. This event was a spiritual reawakening for him. He worked initially with the American Sunday School Union. At a time when public opinion in Cincinnati was dominated by Southern business connections, Chase, influenced by local events, including the attack on the press of James G. Birney during the Cincinnati riots of 1836, associated himself with the anti-slavery movement. Chase was also a member of the literary Semi-Colon Club; its members included Harriet Beecher Stowe and Calvin Ellis Stowe. Chase became the leader of the political reformers, as opposed to the Garrisonian abolitionist movement.

For his defense of people arrested in Ohio under the Fugitive Slave Act of 1793, Chase was dubbed the "Attorney General for Fugitive Slaves." His argument in the case of Jones v. Van Zandt on the constitutionality of fugitive slave laws before the U.S. Supreme Court attracted particular attention. Chase contended that slavery was local, not national, and that it could exist only by virtue of positive state law. He argued that the federal government was not empowered by the Constitution to create slavery anywhere and that when an enslaved person leaves the jurisdiction of a state where slavery is legal, he ceases to be a slave; he continues to be a man and leaves behind the law that made him a slave. In this and similar cases, the court ruled against him, and the judgment against John Van Zandt was upheld.

Though elected as a Whig to a one-year term on the Cincinnati City Council in 1840, Chase left that party the next year. In the 1840s, he helped to form the Liberty Party. For seven years, Chase was the leader of the Liberty Party in Ohio. He helped balance its idealism with his pragmatic approach and political thought. Chase was skillful in drafting platforms and addresses, and he prepared the national Liberty platform of 1843 and the Liberty address of 1845. Building the Liberty Party was slow going. By 1848, Chase was the leader in the effort to combine the Liberty Party with the Barnburners or Van Buren Democrats of New York to form the Free Soil Party.

Chase drafted the Free-Soil platform, and it was chiefly through his influence that Van Buren was their nominee for president in 1848. In 1849, Chase was elected to the U.S. Senate by the Ohio legislature as a Free Soiler. Chase's goal, however, was not to establish a permanent new party organization, but to bring pressure to bear upon Northern Democrats to force them to oppose the extension of slavery. During his associations with the Liberty and Free Soil parties, Chase considered himself an "Independent Democrat" or a "Free Democrat".

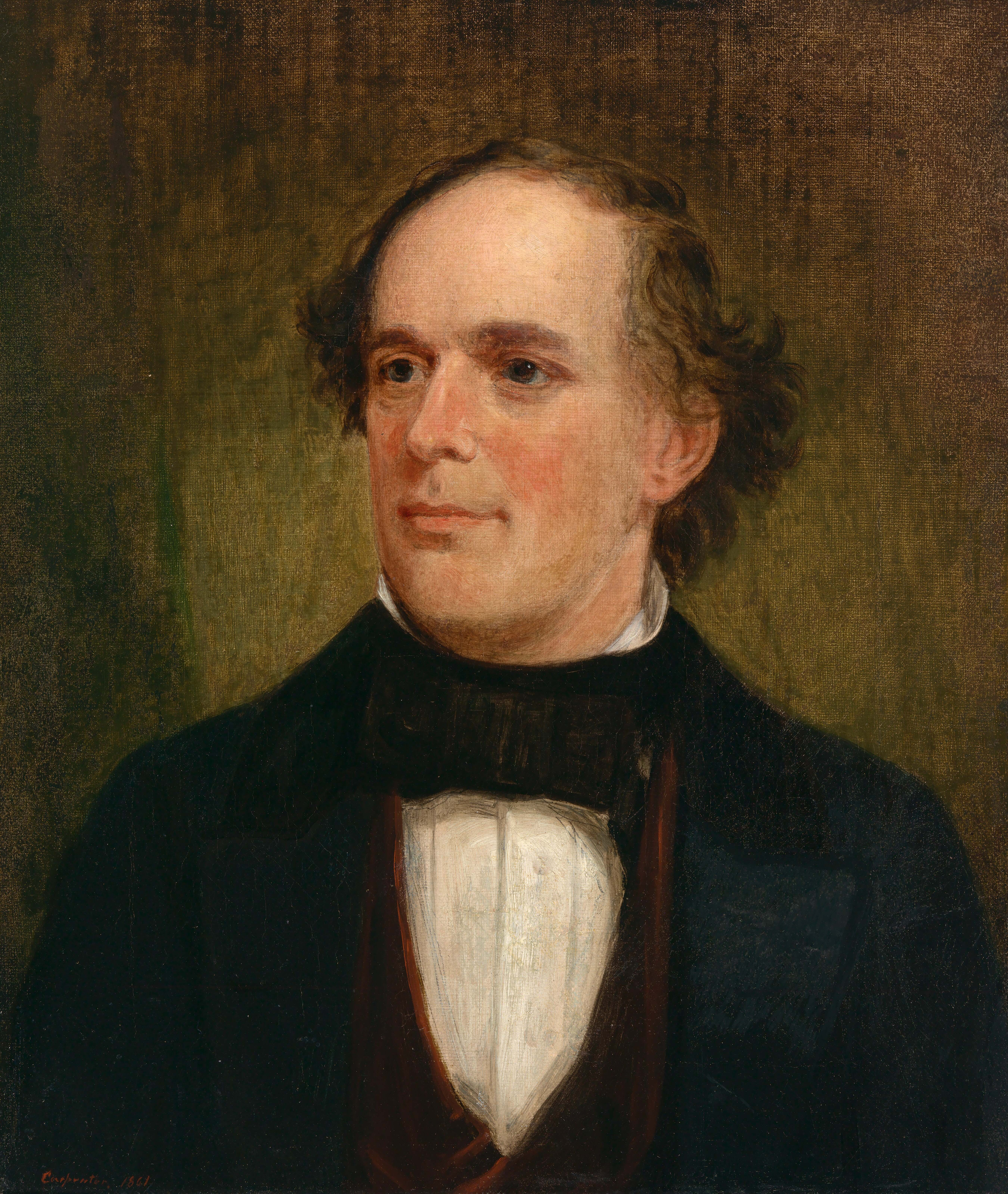
Portrait by Francis Bicknell Carpenter c. 1855

While serving in the Senate (1849–1855), Chase was an anti-slavery champion. He argued against the Compromise of 1850 and the Kansas–Nebraska Act of 1854. After the passage of the Kansas-Nebraska legislation and the subsequent violence in Kansas, Chase helped form the Republican Party with former Whigs and anti-slavery members of the American Party. The "Appeal of the Independent Democrats in Congress to the People of the United States", written by Chase and Giddings, and published in The New York Times on January 24, 1854, was the earliest draft of the Republican party creed. In 1855, Chase was elected the first Republican governor of Ohio. During his time in office, from 1856 to 1860, he supported improved property rights for women, changes to public education, and prison reform, and signed the state's personal liberty laws.

In 1860, Chase sought the Republican nomination for president, with Massachusetts Governor Nathaniel Banks as his running mate. With the exception of William H. Seward, Chase was the most prominent Republican in the country and had done more to end slavery than any other Republican. However, he opposed a "protective tariff," favored by most other Republicans, and his record of collaboration with Democrats annoyed the many Republicans who were former Whigs. At the 1860 Republican National Convention, he got 49 votes on the first ballot, but he had little support outside of Ohio. Abraham Lincoln won the nomination, and Chase supported him.

Chase was elected by the legislature as a Republican to the U.S. Senate from Ohio in 1860. However, he resigned shortly after taking his seat in order to become Secretary of the Treasury under Lincoln. This was despite no prior financial experience. He was a participant in the February 1861 Peace Conference in Washington, a meeting of leading American politicians held in an effort to resolve the burgeoning secession crisis and to preserve the Union on the eve of the Civil War.

== Secretary of the Treasury ==
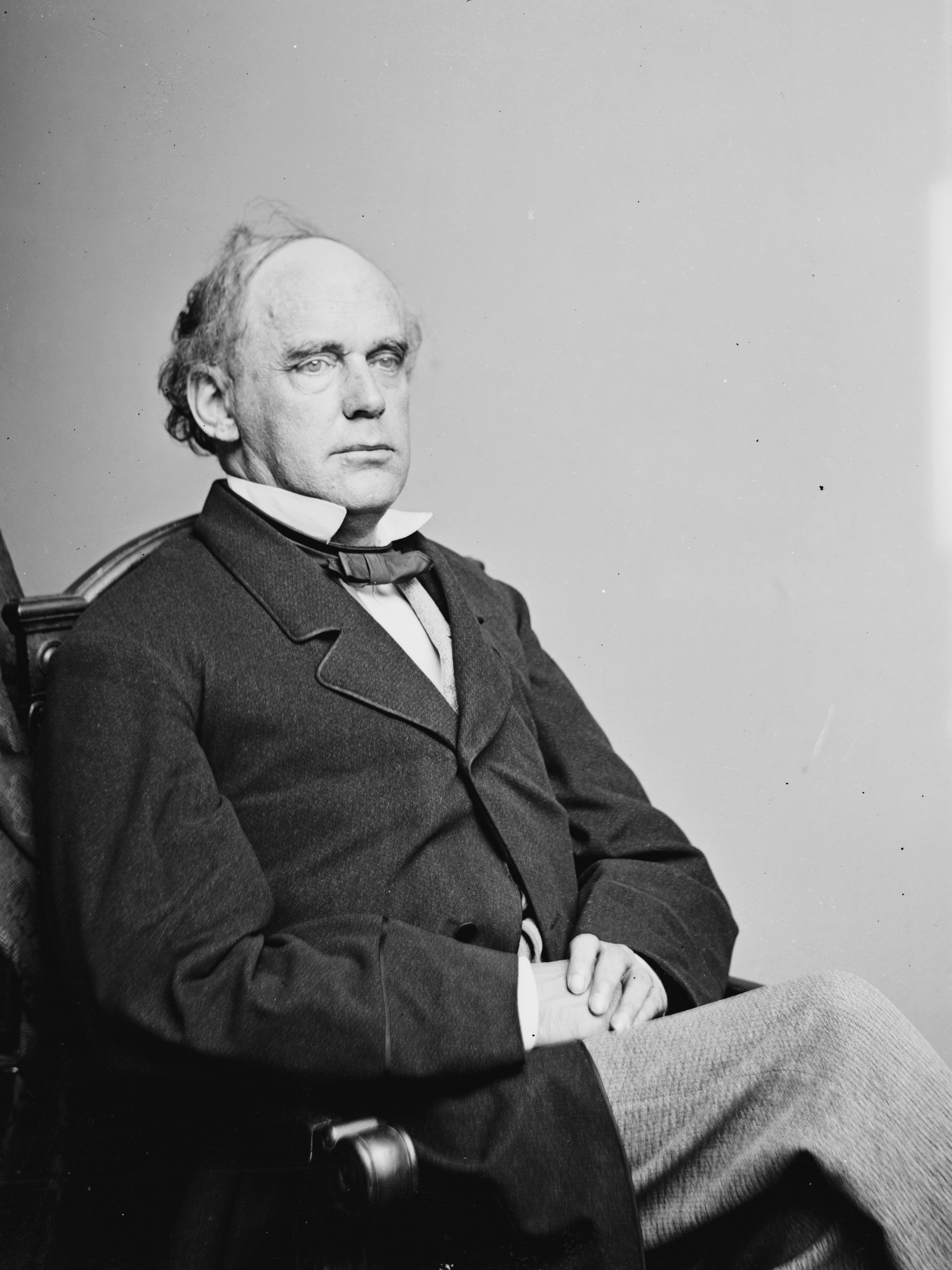
Chase as Secretary of the Treasury

During the Civil War, Chase served as Secretary of the Treasury in President Lincoln's cabinet from 1861 to 1864. In that period of crisis, there were two great changes in American financial policy: the establishment of a national banking system and the issue of paper currency. He suggested the idea, worked out the important principles and many of the details, and induced the Congress to approve them. It secured an immediate market for government bonds and provided a permanent, uniform, and stable national currency. Chase ensured that the Union could sell debt to pay for the war effort. He worked with Jay Cooke & Company to successfully manage the sale of $500 million (~$12.5 billion in 2025) in government war bonds (known as 5/20s) in 1862.

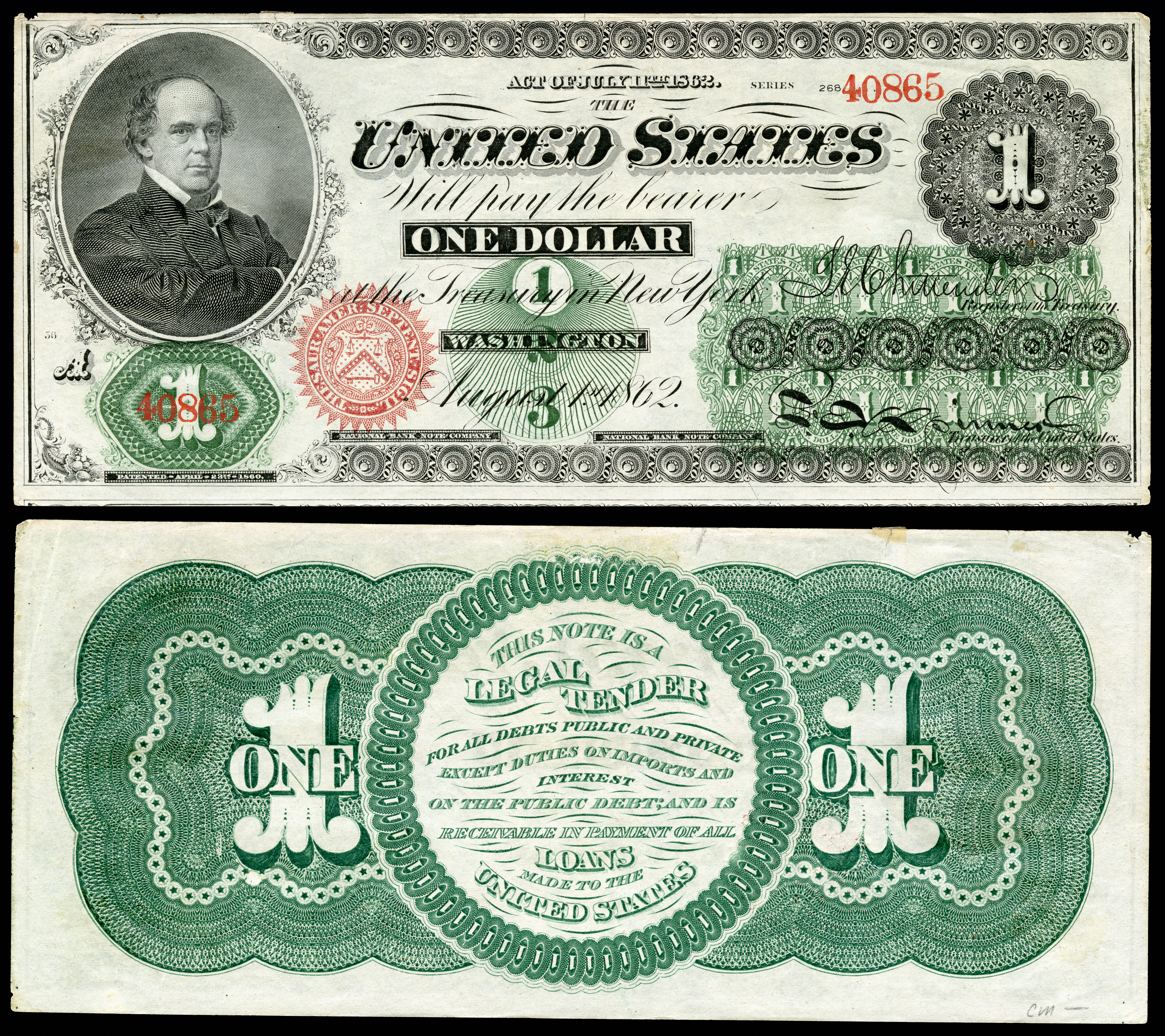
The first issue of $1 notes in 1862 as legal tender, featuring Chase

The first U.S. federal currency, the greenback demand note, was printed in 1861–1862 during Chase's tenure as Secretary of the Treasury, and it was his responsibility to design the notes. In an effort to increase the public's recognition of him, Chase put his own face on a variety of U.S. paper currency, starting with the $1 bill, possibly to further his political career. It was engraved by Joseph Prosper Ourdan.

On May 5, 1862, Chase accompanied President Lincoln, Secretary of War Edwin M. Stanton, and Brigadier General Egbert Ludovicus Viele in what would become a pivotal week for Union forces. The presidential party left the Washington Navy Yard aboard a five-gun Treasury cutter, Miami, bound for Fort Monroe "to ascertain by personal observation whether some further vigilance and vigor might not be infused into the operations of the army and navy at that point" to determine whether Norfolk could be captured. After a 27-hour trip, the Miami reached Fort Monroe on the night of May 6. Chase went with Major General John E. Wool, in command of the Federals at Fort Monroe, to inspect beach locations for a potential troop landing and relayed to Lincoln that he and General Wool had found "a good and convenient landing place" on the south shore, safely away from the Confederates' ironclad, the CSS Virginia. Chase's participation in the reconnaissance ended with the surrender of Norfolk and the destruction of the Virginia.

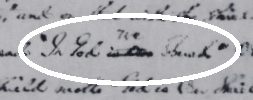
Salmon P. Chase, Treasury Secretary, scribes "In God is our Trust," scratches out "is our" and overwrites "We" to arrive at "In God We Trust" in a December 9, 1863, letter to James Pollock, Director of the Philadelphia Mint.

On October 10, 1862, Secretary of the Navy Gideon Welles wrote that "a scheme for permits, special favors, Treasury agents, and improper management" existed and was arranged by Treasury Secretary Chase for General John A. Dix. The motive of Chase appeared to be for political influence and not for financial gain.

Perhaps Chase's chief defect was an insatiable desire for high office. Throughout his term as Treasury Secretary, Chase exploited his position to build up political support for another run at the presidency in 1864. Benjamin Wade, a Republican commented: "Chase is a good man but his theology is unsound. He thinks there is a fourth person in the Trinity."

He also tried to pressure Lincoln by repeatedly threatening resignation, which he knew would cause Lincoln difficulties with the Radical Republicans.

To honor Chase for introducing the modern system of banknotes, he was depicted on the $10,000 bill printed from 1928 to 1946. Chase was instrumental in placing the phrase "In God We Trust" on United States coins in 1864.

== Chief Justice ==
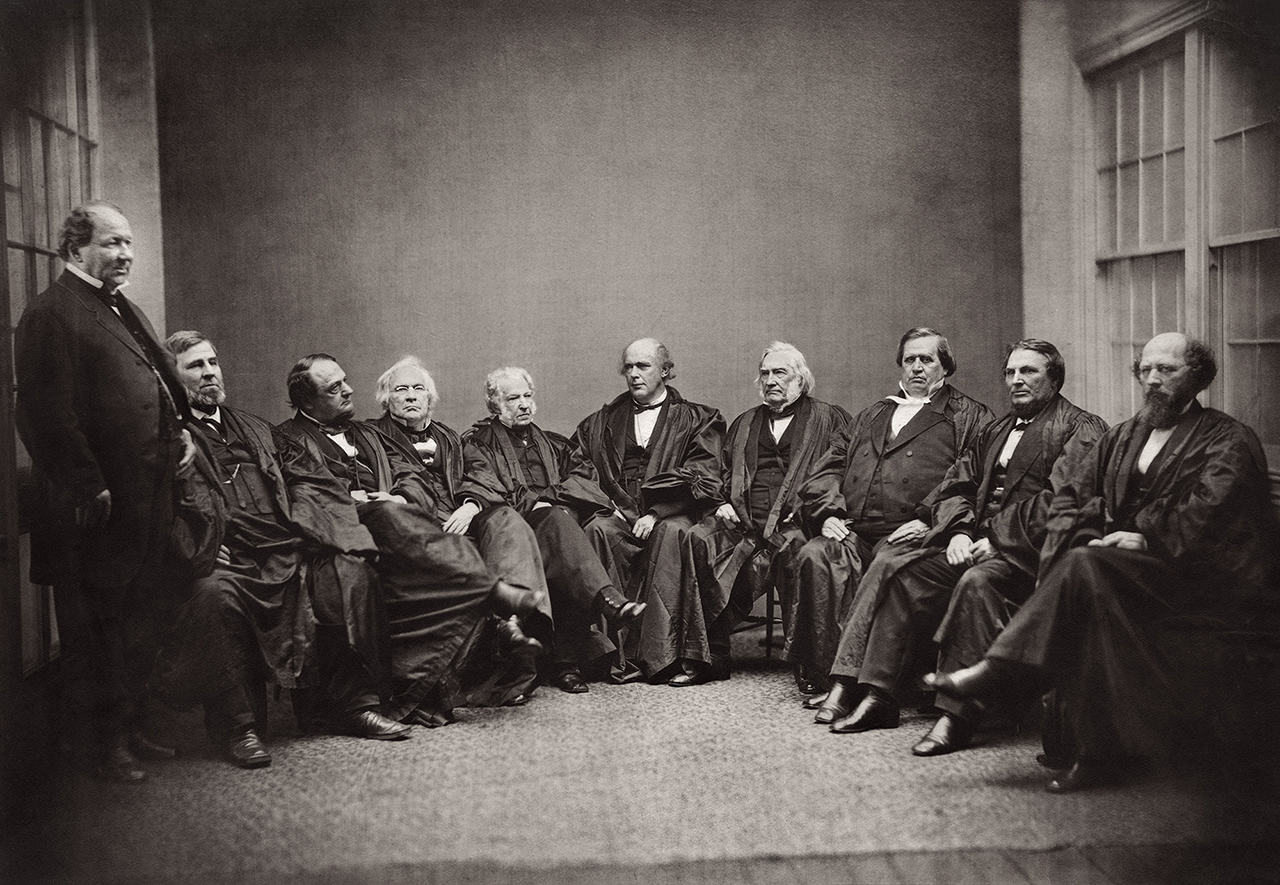
The Chase Court c. 1867

In June 1864, Lincoln surprised Chase by accepting his fourth offer of resignation as Treasury Secretary. The Republican Party had at that point already nominated Lincoln as its presidential candidate and the Treasury was in solid shape, so Lincoln no longer needed to keep Chase in the cabinet to forestall a challenge for the presidential nomination. But to placate the party's Radical wing, Lincoln mentioned Chase as a potential Supreme Court nominee.

When Chief Justice Roger B. Taney died in October 1864, Lincoln named Chase to succeed him. Nominated on December 6, 1864, and confirmed by the U.S. Senate on the same day, he was sworn into office on December 15, 1864, and served until his death on May 7, 1873. One of Chase's first acts as Chief Justice was to admit John Rock to the Supreme Court Bar, making him the first African-American attorney eligible to argue cases before the Supreme Court.

Among his more significant decisions while on the Court were:

- Texas v. White, 74 U.S. 700 (1869), in which he asserted that the Constitution provided for a permanent union, composed of indestructible states, while allowing some possibility of divisibility "through revolution, or through consent of the States";
- Veazie Bank v. Fenno, 75 U.S. 533 (1869), upholding banking legislation of the Civil War that imposed a 10% tax on state banknotes; and
- Hepburn v. Griswold, 75 U.S. 603 (1870), which declared certain parts of the legal tender acts to be unconstitutional. When the legal tender decision was reversed after the appointment of new justices, in 1871 and 1872 (Legal Tender Cases, 79 U.S. 457), Chase dissented.

As Chief Justice, Chase also presided at the impeachment trial of U.S. President Andrew Johnson in 1868. As the justice responsible for the 4th Circuit, Chase also would have been one of two judges at the trial of Jefferson Davis (who was imprisoned at Fort Monroe in Virginia), because trial for major crimes such as treason required two judges. However, Davis's best defense would be that he forfeited U.S. citizenship upon secession, and therefore could not have committed treason. Convicting Davis could also interfere with Chase's presidential ambitions, described below. After the passage of the Fourteenth Amendment in 1868, Chase invited Davis's lawyer to meet with him privately, and explained his theory that Section 3 of the new Amendment prohibited imposing further punishment on former Confederates. When Davis's lawyer repeated this argument in open court, Chase dismissed the case, over the objection of his colleague, U.S. District Judge John Curtiss Underwood, and the government chose not to appeal the dismissal to the U.S. Supreme Court.

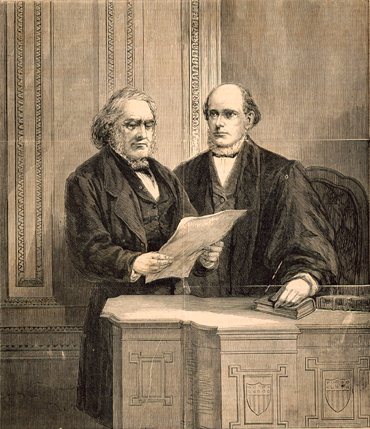
Associate Justice of the Supreme Court Samuel Nelson (left) administers oath to Chief Justice Chase for the impeachment trial of Andrew Johnson.

In 1868, Ohio's leading Copperhead Clement L. Vallandigham worked to secure Chase the Democratic nomination for president. In 1872 Chase helped found the Liberal Republican Party, unsuccessfully seeking its presidential nomination. Chase was also an active Freemason.

Time after time Chase sought a presidential nomination that never came, even when he was Chief Justice in 1868 and 1872. Perceptive critics said his "inordinate ambition" made him "irresolute and wavering." Biographer Frederick J. Blue concludes he was an "inept politician." As early as 1868, Chase concluded that:

Congress was right in not limiting, by its reconstruction acts, the right of suffrage to whites; but wrong in the exclusion from suffrage of certain classes of citizens and all unable to take its prescribed retrospective oath, and wrong also in the establishment of despotic military governments for the States and in authorizing military commissions for the trial of civilians in time of peace. There should have been as little military government as possible; no military commissions; no classes excluded from suffrage; and no oath except one of faithful obedience and support to the Constitution and laws, and of sincere attachment to the constitutional Government of the United States.

A few months before his death, Chase found himself in the minority of a 5–4 ruling in the Slaughter-House Cases, which greatly limited the scope of the powers given the federal government under the Fourteenth Amendment to protect Americans from state violations of their civil rights. With the other dissenters, Chase joined the dissent of Justice Stephen J. Field that the majority opinion effectively rendered the Fourteenth Amendment a "vain and idle enactment."

On October 23, 1873, in formally announcing the death of Chief Justice Chase in the Supreme Court and conveying the resolutions submitted by the bar, Attorney General George Henry Williams highlighted Chase's "early, continued and effectual labours for the universal freedom of man."

== Death ==
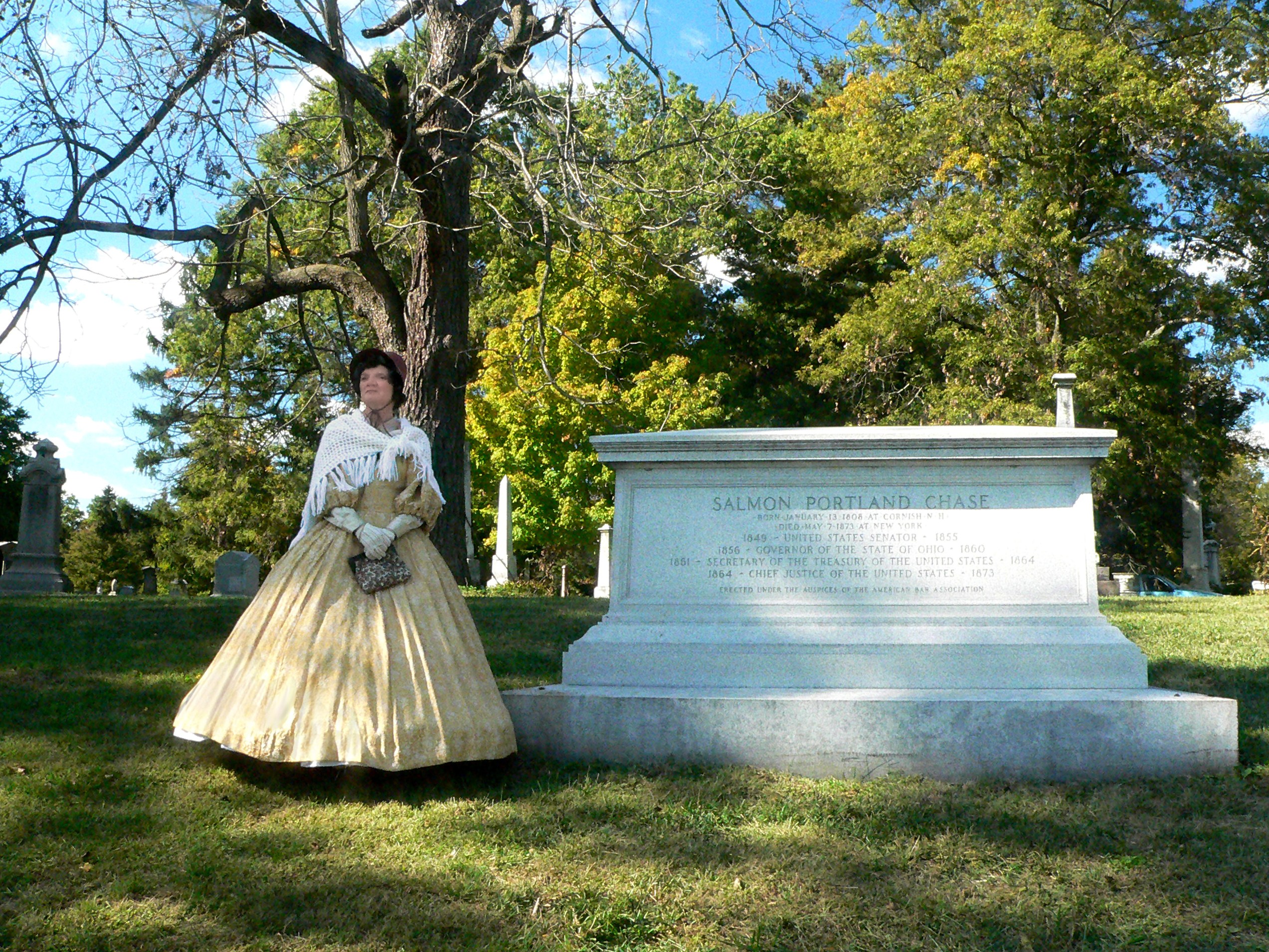
Grave of Salmon Chase in Spring Grove Cemetery; a docent is dressed in period clothing.

Chase died of a stroke in New York City on May 7, 1873. On May 11, The New-York Times published a report on his funeral. His remains were first interred in Oak Hill Cemetery in Washington, D.C., then re-interred in October 1886 in Spring Grove Cemetery, Cincinnati, Ohio. Chase had been an active member of St. Paul Episcopal Cathedral, Cincinnati. Chase's birthplace in New Hampshire was declared a National Historic Landmark in 1975.

== Legacy ==
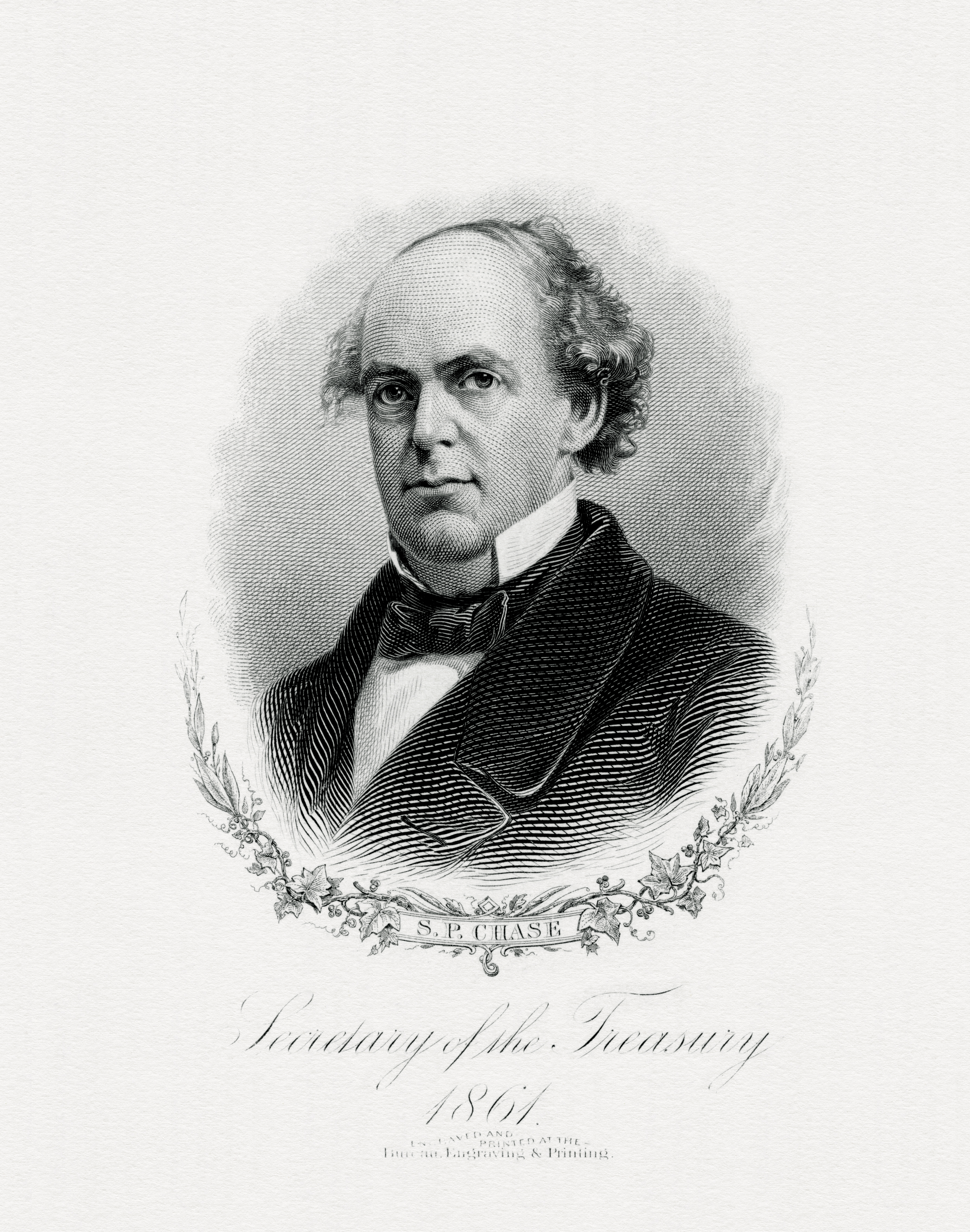
Bureau of Engraving and Printing portrait of Chase as Secretary of the Treasury

After Chase's death in 1873, the Supreme Court established a tradition that a newly deceased Justice's chair and the front of the bench where the Justice sat will be draped with black wool crêpe, with black crêpe hung over the Court's entrance.

The Chase National Bank, a predecessor of Chase Manhattan Bank which is now JPMorgan Chase, was named in his honor, though he had no affiliation with it, financial or otherwise.

In 1845, Chase was presented with a silver pitcher by black leaders in the city of Cincinnati. Engraved on the pitcher were the words “A testimonial of gratitude to Salmon P. Chase from the Colored People of Cincinnati for his various public services in behalf of the oppressed."

In May 1865, Chase was elected a 3rd class companion of the Military Order of the Loyal Legion of the United States (MOLLUS). MOLLUS was an organization of Union officers who had served in the Civil War which allowed distinguished civilians who had supported the Union cause to join as 3rd class companions. Chase was one of the first to receive this honor and was assigned MOLLUS insignia number 46.

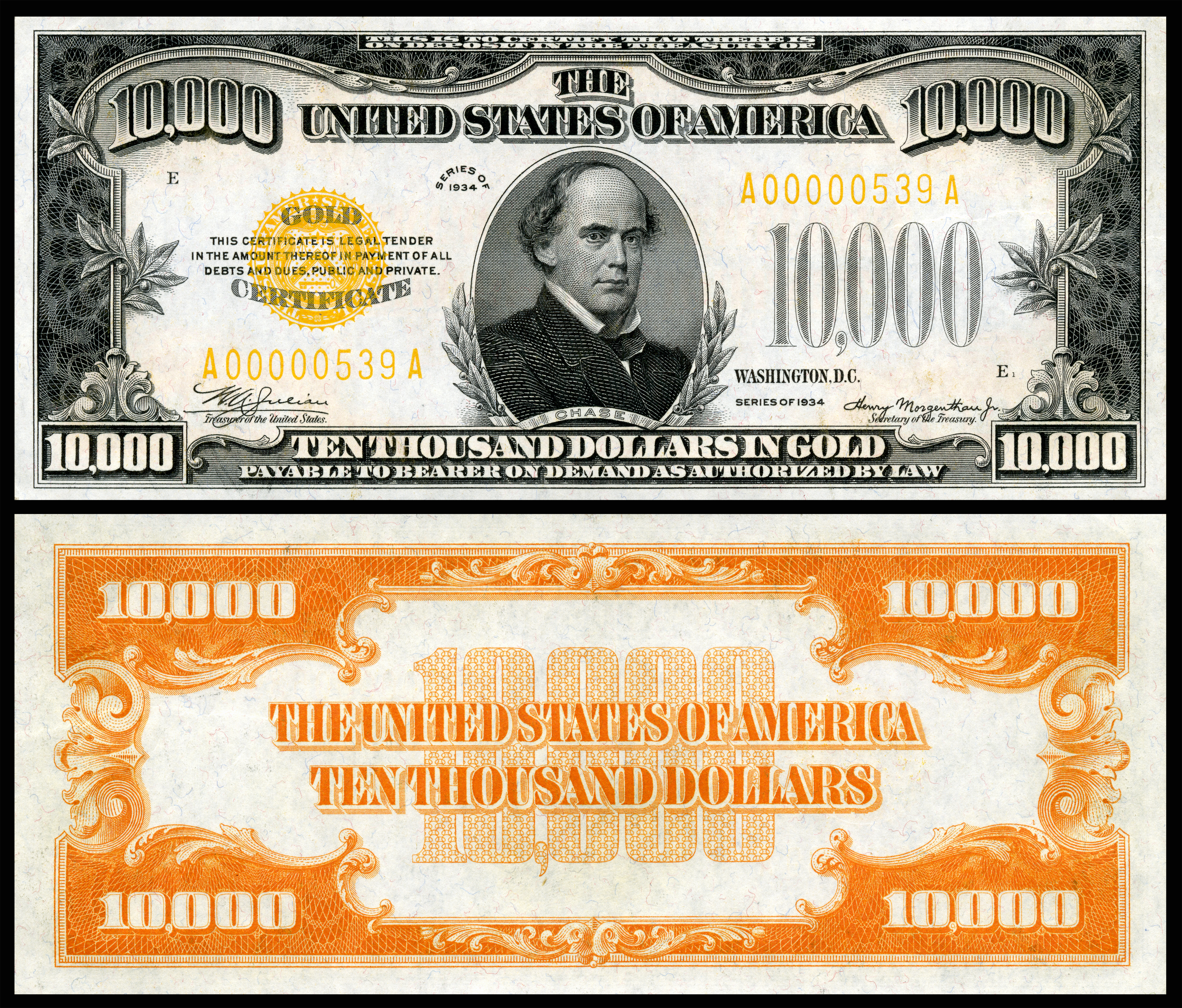
Chase depicted on the 1934 $10,000 gold certificate

Chase's portrait appears on the United States $10,000 bill, the largest denomination of U.S. currency to publicly circulate. The bill was last printed in 1945. In 1969, the Federal Reserve began withdrawing high-denomination bills from circulation, and as of 2009, only 336 $10,000 bills had not been returned for destruction.

Chase County, Kansas, Chase City, Virginia, and towns named "Chaseville" in Florida, Massachusetts, North Carolina (from 1868 to 1871), New York, Ohio, and Tennessee were named in his honor. Camp Chase in Columbus, Ohio, and Chase Hall, the main barracks and dormitory at the United States Coast Guard Academy, are named for Chase in honor of his service as Secretary of the Treasury, and the United States Coast Guard cutter Chase (WHEC 718) is named for him, as are Chase Hall at the Harvard Business School, Chase House at the Tuck School of Business at Dartmouth College, and the Salmon P. Chase College of Law at Northern Kentucky University. He is featured on a New Hampshire historical marker (number 76) along New Hampshire Route 12A in Cornish.

In 2024, the Salmon P. Chase Center for Civics, Culture, and Society was created at The Ohio State University in Columbus, Ohio. The Chase Center is an independent academic center.

== In popular culture ==
Although not referred to by name, Chase was portrayed by Montagu Love in the 1942 film Tennessee Johnson and appears during Andrew Johnson's impeachment scenes. Chase was portrayed by Josh Stamberg in the 2013 movie Saving Lincoln.

Chase was portrayed by Mark Rand in the 2024 Apple TV+ miniseries series Manhunt.

Chase is referenced in the TV animated adult show Archer as the man on the $10,000 bill.

== See also ==
- Anti-Nebraska movement
- Appeal of the Independent Democrats
- Economic history of the American Civil War#Union policy
- List of chief justices of the United States
- List of United States Supreme Court cases by the Chase Court
- Semi-Colon Club

U.S. Senate
Preceded by William Allen	U.S. senator (Class 3) from Ohio; 1849–1855; Served alongside: Thomas Corwin, Thomas Ewing, Benjamin Wade	Succeeded by George Pugh
Preceded by George Pugh	U.S. senator (Class 3) from Ohio; 1861; Served alongside: Benjamin Wade	Succeeded by John Sherman
Party political offices
New political party	Republican nominee for Governor of Ohio; 1855, 1857	Succeeded by William Dennison
Political offices
Preceded by William Medill	Governor of Ohio; 1856–1860	Succeeded by William Dennison
Preceded by John Dix	United States Secretary of the Treasury; 1861–1864	Succeeded by William Fessenden
Legal offices
Preceded by Roger Taney	Chief Justice of the United States; 1864–1873	Succeeded by Morrison Waite
