= Salmon P. Chase Birthplace =

Historic house in New Hampshire, United States

- Salmon P. Chase Birthplace and Childhood Home
- U.S. National Register of Historic Places
- U.S. National Historic Landmark
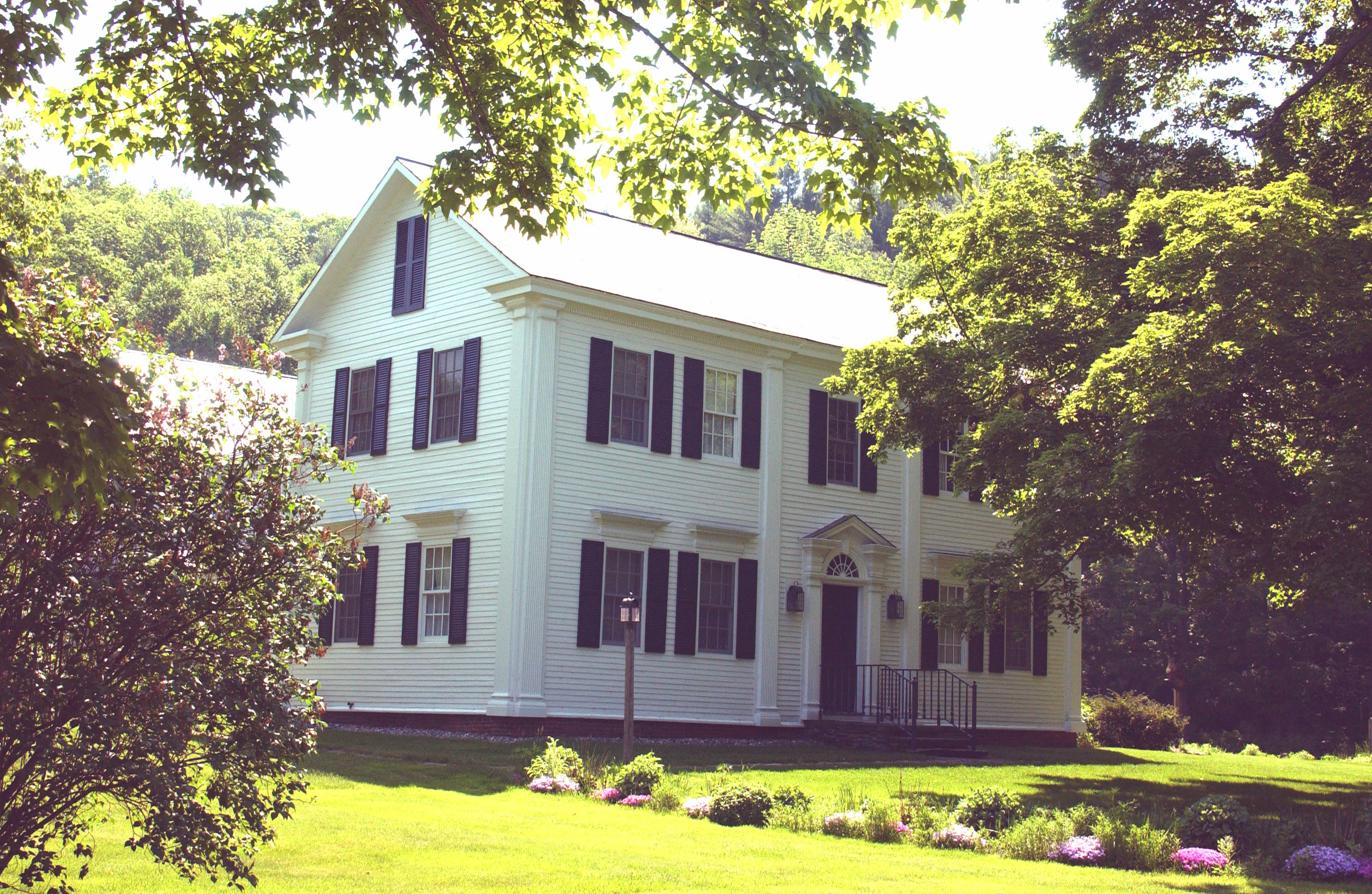

- Location within New Hampshire Location within the United States
- Location: Cornish, New Hampshire
- Coordinates: 43°27′18.02″N 72°23′13.78″W
- Area: 4 acres (1.6 ha)
- Built: 1808
- Architectural style: Colonial
- NRHP reference No.: 75000133

Significant dates
- Added to NRHP: May 15, 1975
- Designated NHL: May 15, 1975

Salmon P. Chase Birthplace was the birthplace and childhood home of Salmon P. Chase in New Hampshire, United States. It is located about 8 miles (13 km) north of Claremont on New Hampshire Route 12A. The 2 1/2-story wood-frame house was built c. 1790, and is a multi-section structure in an L shape. The main block is five bays wide and two deep, with a centered entry that has Greek Revival pilasters on the central entry and on the corners. This block faces west, and two narrower sections extend east from the rear. The first of these sections is also 2 1/2 stories, with two chimneys. The easternmost section is 1 1/2 stories, and was originally connected to a barn. The house is believed to be well-preserved, but there is no documentary evidence of its appearance in the early 19th century, and it is known to have been moved across the street from its original site in about 1848.

The house's significance arises because it is the only known building associated directly with the life of Salmon P. Chase (1808–1873). Chase was born in this house, and lived here until he was eight, when he was sent to live with relatives in Ohio after his father died. Chase had a long and distinguished legal and political career, serving as Governor of Ohio and contending with Abraham Lincoln for the 1860 nomination as the Republican Party candidate for president. Lincoln appointed Chase to be Treasury Secretary, a post he held during the American Civil War, and from which he strongly advocated abolitionist positions as a Radical Republican. Lincoln appointed Chase Chief Justice of the United States Supreme Court in 1864, a post he held until his death.

The house was declared a National Historic Landmark, and listed on the National Register of Historic Places, in 1975. The home is currently operated as a bed and breakfast, the Chase House Inn.

== See also ==
- List of National Historic Landmarks in New Hampshire
- National Register of Historic Places listings in Sullivan County, New Hampshire
