= Fox v. Ohio =

- Supreme Court of the United States

Decided February 22, 1847
- Full case name: Fox v. Ohio
- Citations: 46 U.S. 410 (more)

Holding
- States may criminalize the spending of counterfeit money.

Court membership
- Chief Justice Roger B. Taney Associate Justices John McLean · James M. Wayne; John Catron · John McKinley; Peter V. Daniel · Samuel Nelson; Levi Woodbury · Robert C. Grier

Case opinions
- Majority: Daniel
- Dissent: McLean

Fox v. Ohio, 46 U.S. 410 (1847), was a United States Supreme Court case in which the court held that states may criminalize the spending of counterfeit money. By implication, this case was an early expression of the doctrine that the state and federal governments may punish the same acts as separate sovereigns without violating the Double Jeopardy Clause, but the specific crimes each sovereign charged in this case were slightly different.

== Background ==
Ohio indicted Malinda Fox for the crime of "passing and uttering a certain piece of false, base, and counterfeit coin, forged and counterfeited to the likeness and similitude of the good and legal silver coin currently passing in the State of Ohio, called a dollar." Fox was convicted. In 1842, the Ohio Supreme Court affirmed the conviction on appeal.

Fox appealed the case to the Supreme Court, claiming that the judgment needed to be reversed because states had no jurisdiction over the offense of counterfeiting. Article 1, Section 8 of the federal Constitution gives to Congress the power "To coin money, regulate the value thereof, and of foreign coin, and fix the standard of weights and measures " and "To provide for the punishment of counterfeiting the securities and current coin of the United States." Fox claimed that this reserved the regulation of counterfeiting to the exclusive jurisdiction of the federal government.

== Opinion of the court ==
The Supreme Court issued an opinion on February 22, 1847. In an opinion written by Justice Peter V. Daniel, the court held that the stipulations in Article I, Section 8 did not prevent a state from passing a law to punish the offense of circulating counterfeit coin of the United States.

Because the case predated the Fourteenth Amendment, the Fifth Amendment's Double Jeopardy Clause was not incorporated against the states. Therefore, double jeopardy was considered an inherent concern of the federal government, but not an inherent concern of the states.

Justice John McLean dissented, saying it was well-established by previous cases that the states could not charge people with violations of federal law. He said:

The point is not whether a state may not punish an offense under an act of Congress, but whether the state may inflict, by virtue of its own sovereignty, punishment for the same act as an offense against the state which the federal government may constitutionally punish.
If this be so, it is a great defect in our system. For the punishment under the state law would be no bar to a prosecution under the law of Congress. And to punish the same act by the two governments would violate not only the common principles of humanity, but would be repugnant to the nature of both governments. If there were a concurrent power in both governments to punish the same act, a conviction under the laws of either could be pleaded in bar to a prosecution by the other.

McLean also noted that, although he was a lone dissenter now, Justice Joseph Story had agreed with him after the initial arguing of the case before the court. Seeking a majority, the court ordered the case to be reargued. In the intervening years, Story had died.

== Subsequent developments ==
The Supreme Court squarely upheld the separate sovereigns doctrine as an exception to the Double Jeopardy Clause for the first time in United States v. Lanza (1922).
