= Appeal of the Independent Democrats =

The Appeal of the Independent Democrats (the full title was "Appeal of the Independent Democrats in Congress to the People of the United States") was a manifesto issued in January 1854, in response to the introduction into the United States Senate of the Kansas-Nebraska Act. The Appeal was signed by then-prominent American politicians Salmon Chase, Charles Sumner, Joshua Giddings, Edward Wade, Gerrit Smith and Alexander De Witt. Chase and Giddings were concerned that the bill repealed the Missouri Compromise, opening the proposed new territories of Kansas and Nebraska to slavery.

The Appeal stated:

We arraign this bill as a gross violation of a sacred pledge; as a criminal betrayal of precious rights; as part and parcel of an atrocious plot to exclude from a vast unoccupied region immigrants from the Old World and free laborers from our own States, and convert it into a dreary region of despotism, inhabited by masters and slaves.

Chase reviewed the history of the Missouri Compromise and argued that it had been accepted by the North only with the expectation that most of the remaining territory from the Louisiana Purchase would remain as free territory. Realizing that the Missouri Compromise was "canonized in the hearts of the American people", he called for both religious and political action in order to defeat the bill.

The Appeal was originally published in the Cincinnati Gazette and widely reprinted by other newspapers throughout the country. Historian Eric Foner wrote, "Historians have tended to agree that the 'Appeal' was one of the most effective pieces of political propaganda in our history." Chase's description of an aggressive Slave Power came to be accepted in much of the North.

Historian Allan Nevins wrote that Chase's language was often "grossly exaggerated" and used as an example the claim that the bill would "permanently subjugate the whole country to the yoke of a slaveholding despotism." Nevins argued that the Appeal did much to arouse Southern resentment against the anti-slavery opponents of the bill.

By portraying the bill as pro-slavery aggression by Southerners against the North, it preempted Senator Stephen Douglas's planned justification of the measure as an embodiment of popular sovereignty and forced most Southern Whigs in Congress to support the measure.

The Appeal launched the "anti-Nebraska" movement, later organized into the Republican Party.

== Background ==
The "Appeal of the Independent Democrats" was written on January 19, 1854. The entire document was written by: S. P. Chase, Charles Sumner, J. R. Giddings, Edward Wade, Gerritt Smith, and Alexander De Witt. All of the signatories were strongly opposed to the expansion of slavery and had been elected on third-party tickets such as Free Soil.The document was a response to the debate over the second version of the Kansas-Nebraska bill, which, unlike the first version, explicitly repealed the Missouri Compromise of 1820, and thus threatened to open up the entire territory to slaveholding. The men all banded together to write it, because they were strong believers that this bill should not be passed, as they saw it as opening the West to the expansion of slavery.
