= Salem Methodist Church (Huntsboro, North Carolina) =

Historic church in North Carolina, United States

- U.S. National Register of Historic Places
- U.S. Historic district
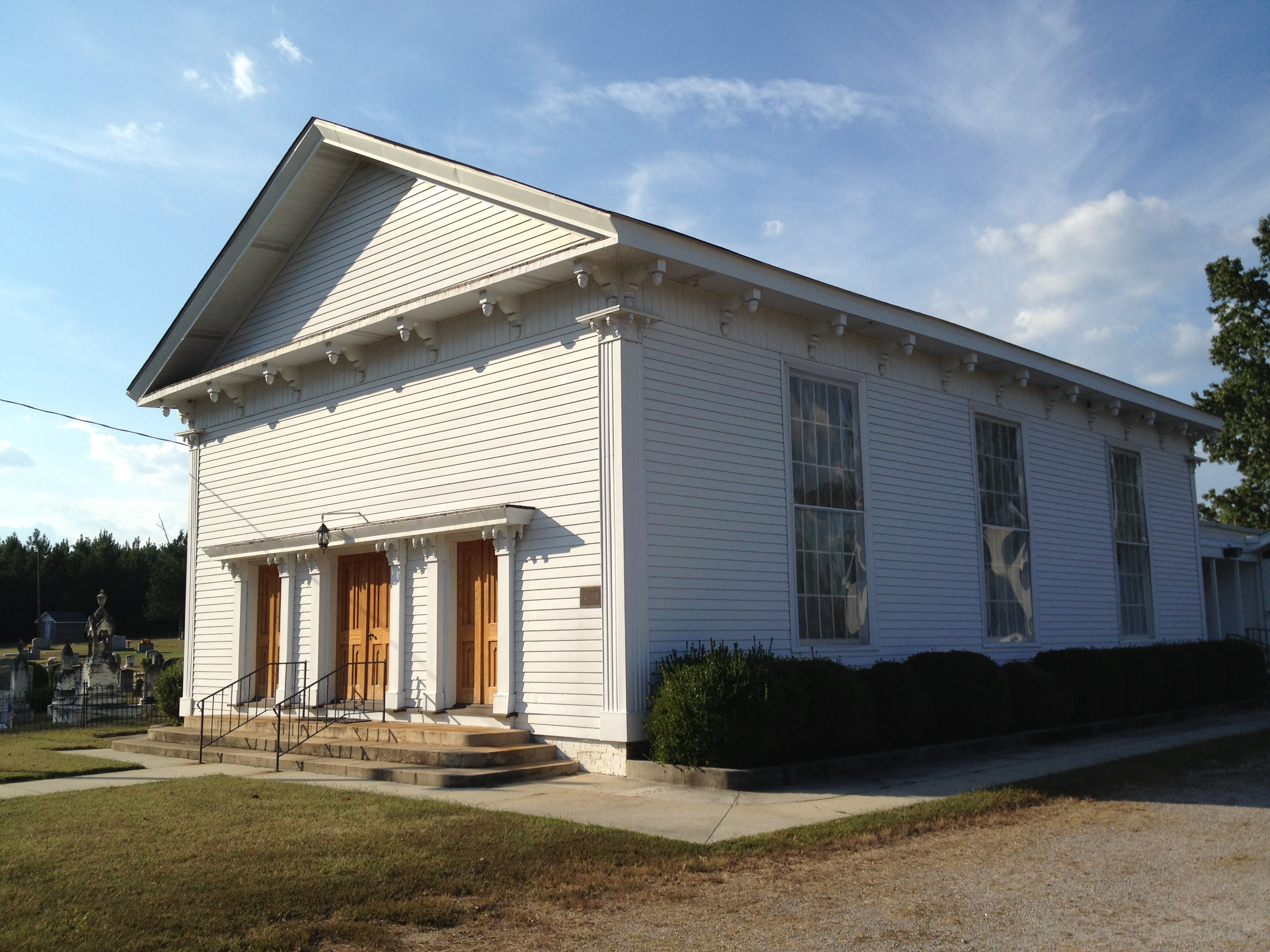

- Location within North Carolina Location within the United States
- Location: NC 1522, near Huntsboro, North Carolina
- Coordinates: 36°21′1″N 78°32′22″W
- Area: 8 acres (3.2 ha)
- Built: 1860-1861
- Built by: Short, John
- Architect: Holt, Jacob
- Architectural style: Greek Revival, Italianate, Gothic Revival
- MPS: Granville County MPS
- NRHP reference No.: 88001259
- Added to NRHP: August 31, 1988

Salem Methodist Church is a historic Methodist church located near Huntsboro, Granville County, North Carolina. It was likely designed by noted regional architect Jacob W. Holt and constructed by slaves in 1860–1861. It is a one-story, three-bay, heavy timber frame, church building with Greek Revival, Italianate, and Gothic Revival style design elements. Also on the property is the contributing church cemetery.

It was listed on the National Register of Historic Places in 1988.
