= Long Grass Plantation =

Historic house in Virginia, United States

- Long Grass
- U.S. National Register of Historic Places
- U.S. Historic district
- Virginia Landmarks Register
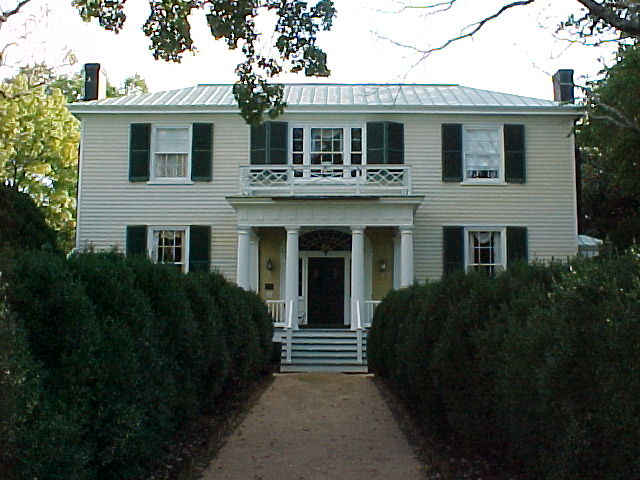
- Front view of Long Grass Plantation

- Location within Virginia Location within the United States
- Location: VA 826, Eppes Fork, Virginia
- Coordinates: 36°33′16″N 78°20′42″W
- Area: 40 acres (16 ha)
- Built: 1800
- Built by: Jacob W. Holt
- Architectural style: Greek Revival
- NRHP reference No.: 95000894
- VLR No.: 058-0185

Significant dates
- Added to NRHP: July 21, 1995
- Designated VLR: April 28, 1995

Long Grass Plantation is a historic house and national historic district located along what was the Roanoke River basin. In the 1950s most of it was flooded and became the Buggs Island Lake/John H. Kerr Reservoir in Mecklenburg County, Virginia. The house was built circa 1800 by George Tarry on land belonging to his father, Samuel Tarry, and Long Grass Plantation encompassed approximately 2000 acres (8 km^{2}).

Today, most of the land once belonging to the plantation is submerged and is owned by the US Army Corps of Engineers. Only 27 +/- acres of privately owned land make up the grounds of Long Grass plantation. The property was listed on the Virginia Landmarks Registry and the National Register of Historic Places on July 21, 1995.

== Evolution of the main structure ==
The original c. 1797 hall and parlor structure still exists. This small dwelling probably already existed when George Tarry moved to Long Grass Plantation. It was added to during renovations and expansions in four major phases, two in the nineteenth century and two in the twentieth century, from the 1830s to the mid-1990s.

The current structure is dominated by the additions made in 1832 by the builder-architect Jacob W. Holt of Warrenton, North Carolina. In 1831–1832, Holt was commissioned to add a 2-story, single-pile, 3-bay structure to the front of the original 1797 1 1/2-story house. The two sections were connected via a 1-story hyphen with large windows on its side walls. The 1832 Greek Revival home in the front is much larger in scale and mass than the original 1797 hall and parlor house. The new front has a neoclassical entrance and porch (probably salvaged from an earlier home in Warren County or along the Roanoke River), This porch features many "Jeffersonian" details, and the double front door surrounded by glass transom and sidelights which were mentioned in the book, Life on the Roaring Roanoke. This spacious new addition was an indication of the family's improving economic fortune generated from tobacco cultivation by slave labor. It was built as a wedding present in 1832, when George Tarry married Mary Euphemia Hamilton.

Around 1857, Holt was commissioned to make improvements to the original 1797 structure. By this time, Holt had adopted elements of the popular mid-Victorian Italianate style of architecture in his designs. He raised the roof of the original hall and parlor to make a full second story and designed a relatively ornate single-story Victorian Italianate porch across the rear of the house.

A rear view of the main structure showing the original hall and parlor house enlarged with a second story and an ornate rear porch

During the Depression years, the house was leased to a tenant farmer. The Tarry family returned to live at Long Grass in the late 1950s.

In the 1950s, the house was renovated and retrofitted with modern mechanical systems. The one-story hyphen connecting the two structures was raised to two stories. Two new bathrooms were created – one upstairs in the new hyphen space and one downstairs in the 1832 dining room just off of the hyphen hall. The Tarrys changed the dining room into a bedroom, and used the original 1797 parlor as their family dining room. They also added a kitchen adjoining and attached the original 1797 structure at that time. This kitchen was adjacent to the 1797 dining room.

The most recent renovation occurred in 1992–1994 after Bruce and Sudie Park of Raleigh, North Carolina purchased the property. Michael Denton of Clarksville, Virginia and Trent Park, son of the owners managed the renovation project, including manufacture of custom moldings at the farm workshop. The property was completely renovated. Spaces between the original hall and parlor and the Holt addition, on either side of the hyphen, were enclosed and a breakfast room and library were added on the first floor, and two new bathrooms upstairs. New closets were added in such a way as to maintain the symmetry of the existing rooms throughout the home. The 1950s bathroom was removed from the 1832 Holt dining room. New, updated mechanical systems were installed. Exterior and interior repairs were made to the entire structure. New foundations were built for the exterior porches when new floors were laid. A new terne metal roof was installed.

The 1831 entry hall walls are covered in an 18th-century Chinese hand-painted wall covering which was donated to Long Grass by the Marshall Cooper Family of Henderson, North Carolina. The Cooper Family owned Harriet Henderson Mills. The home that this wall covering came from was owned by Marshall Cooper, Sr. and upon his widow's death the home was demolished by the family. It was located on Charles Street in Henderson, North Carolina.

== Outbuildings ==
Several outbuildings or dependencies have been preserved: the ice house, smokehouse, kitchen/laundry, schoolhouse, tobacco pack house, two tobacco barns, and a Fox Trott-style tenant dwelling. The tenant house is probably C. 1850–1880. It is a hand-hewn log structure, now in an advanced state of decay. The pack house is also nearing disrepair. All of the other buildings are structurally sound. An 1857 wooden carriage house/livestock barn which, after the flooding of the reservoir sat on Army Corps of Engineer land was struck by lightning in the early 1980s. It eventually was sold to the Parks by the Corps. However, by then, it was beyond repair and was demolished. The purchase agreement between the Parks and the Army states that a new carriage house or similar building may be constructed within the foundation footprint of this destroyed building. The building may not be used as a residence, however. The Parks have maintained this foundation for future building on this site.

Items of note:

The frame ice house (c. 1832, probably built by Jacob Holt) is a two-story wood-frame building, unusually large for an ice house or dairy. The structure contains a deep ice pit underneath, with two exterior doors on the building's sides to allow access to the cold storage area at ground level. In winter months, ice was harvested from shallow ponds located in fields around the plantation. After a thick layer of ice was added to the pit, a thick layer of sawdust was added. These alternating layers filled the 14-foot hole to the level of the access doors. The volume of frozen ice/sawdust kept the ice from melting during hot Virginia summers. A series of vents just above the ground level of this building, and vents above the two access doors, aided in keeping a consistent cold temperature below the building. In time the first story was used to store corn, and the second story was used as a pigeon coop. The interior of the second story still has a lead lining to protect the building from pecking pigeons. The squab or "baby" pigeons provided the family with Sunday morning breakfasts. In the 1960s the family got rid of their pigeons.

The one-room schoolhouse (c. 1800) was renovated and expanded in the 1950s for use as a lake cottage with kitchen, bathroom and sleeping loft. This building is a square-hewn wood log cabin. The Tarry family sheathed this building in barn siding and added a tin roof when the cottage was built. It was a girls' school for families in Mecklenburg County, Virginia, until the early 1900s. The teacher slept in an upstairs loft. After the school closed, the structure was used as a blacksmith shop.

The smoke house (c. 1832) was noted in 19th-century letters as being one of the largest and most secure in the region. Remnants of a large, "strong arm" lock were discovered behind it. The door on this building was two layers thick, with wood on the outside running vertically, and the interior wood running horizontally with a strong reinforcement of iron "peg" nails every inch through it. Since the 1960s this building has been used mostly to house poultry.

The kitchen and laundry outbuilding (c. 1832 (Holt) and c. 1857 (Holt)) is a one-story frame building with two doors and two louver windows on its front side. The rear side of this building originally had two louvered windows. In modern times, one of these windows was replaced with a door. In 1832, the building was only half as large as it is today, and contained a kitchen with a wooden floor and a massive stone "cooking" fireplace with a brick chimney. Viewed from the front, the kitchen door is on the right side. Later (probably during Holt's 1857 renovation), the structure was doubled in size by adding a laundry to the original kitchen building. One can still see exterior boards from the kitchen building inside of the laundry side next to the fireplace. The original stone fireplace for the kitchen was accessed as a shared fireplace for both sides. During a storm in 2016 that blew down a giant nearby oak tree, the fireplaces collapsed. The wooden mantles survive as does the brick chimney top.

The tobacco pack house has suffered serious structural damage but is relatively well-protected. This is the building where Burley tobacco was sorted, hung on tobacco sticks, cured in a damp cellar, then dried in the second floor, before being packed into wooden casks. The barrels were then rolled to the Roanoke River and shipped to market. The structure is two stories high with an open cellar area which can be accessed from interior or exterior which is fully open at the foundation. In its current configuration, it is roughly rectangular with four irregularly shaped rooms on the first story and a large loft area above. There are few window openings. A large, stone-lined humidor pit underneath a portion of the structure was used for storage of cured tobacco.

A "two-seat" outhouse was still in existence when the Plantation was purchased by the Parks, but has since been demolished. This building was very much in the style of the Holt C.1857 addition to the main house. The brackets on the eaves were a close match to the brackets on the Italianate back porch, and the building had plaster walls. Also extant at that time was a small, portable corncrib built out of small diameter tree trunks with spaces between, and a tin roof.

Many additional foundations for tobacco curing barns can be found throughout the fields. There are two tobacco curing barns standing today which are of the turn of the century log construction.

When Buggs Island Reservoir is drained periodically for maintenance by the Corps of Engineers, many more foundations are visible along the old flooded road bed which once led to Palmer Springs. These buildings yield many fragments of metal parts, and other clues as to the uses that they served on the Plantation. There was a mill, a ferry, a mill works, a tannery, a brick making area, and a blacksmith shop. In the garden there are still two millstones from Tarry's mill. There was a ferry and a landing owned by the Tarry family.

It is rumored that George Tarry bought Bugg's Island, which the Virginia side of the Reservoir is named for. The North Carolina side of the lake is named The James H. Kerr Lake Reservoir for a North Carolina congressman responsible for getting the funding to build the lake.

According to a Civil War period map, Tarry's slave quarters were not close to the big house. The house servants stayed in the house; field hands lived approximately where the small homes are located, around and across from Center Hill Farm, from the junction of Eppes Fork Rd. and Mill Creek Rd. to the North Carolina border. After the Civil War, the Tarry family gave acreage to their former slaves, much of which is still owned by their descendants. There seemed to be a continued freed man work force at Long Grass for many years.

== Other history ==
The land on which Ivy Hill and later Wildwood were built resulted from land grants from the Commonwealth of Virginia to Edward Tarry, Sr. These land grants were signed by Governors Patrick Henry, John Page, and "Light Horse" Harry Lee. The original grant documents remain in the possession of the Tarry family today. Framed copies of them hang at Long Grass. Samuel Tarry built Ivy Hill Plantation House (the Tarry family seat) in the early 1730s. He had three sons, Edward, Jr., a lifelong bachelor—who never married but raped a Slave named Ellen who gave birth to one of his children, who inherited Ivy Hill (flooded by the construction of Buggs Island Reservoir, and now an archaeological park), George Tarry, who moved Long Grass with an extant small home on the land when he took over the property, and William, who inherited land that joined Ivy Hill Plantation to Long Grass Plantation, which would later be called Wildwood.

== Historic trees ==
Planted in the front yard of Long Grass is the "Constitution Oak" given as a remembrance gift to George Patrick Tarry when he served as a delegate from Mecklenburg County to the constitutional convention of 1901–1902. The tree is a Burr Oak and is an unusual, slow-growing species in Virginia. Each of the delegates to this constitutional convention was given a sapling to plant in their county to commemorate the event.

In 1951 there was a fiftieth anniversary celebration of the 1901 convention. A man came to Long Grass to ask Evelyn Tarry, the widow of William Tarry, if he could collect enough burr acorns to raise saplings to give out at the ceremony. He told her that he had visited all of the counties where delegates planted the original saplings, and very few had survived. The next spring he brought Mrs. Tarry a sapling, and she proudly planted her "Baby" in the back yard, where it grows today. So, Long Grass has "Big Daddy" tree in the front, and the "Son" in the back.

The huge Osage orange tree, 'Maclura pomifera', or hedge apple grows in the side yard of Long Grass House. Family legend says this tree came from Tarry cousin Meriweather Lewis of the Lewis and Clark Expedition of 1804–1806.

Each time a child was born to George Patrick Tarry, a walnut tree was planted; two of the three remain. One is next to a mature boxwood hedge at the front porch, and one is covered with ivy and Virginia creeper next to the kitchen door on the back porch.
