= Forestville Baptist Church =

Historic church in North Carolina, United States

- U.S. National Register of Historic Places
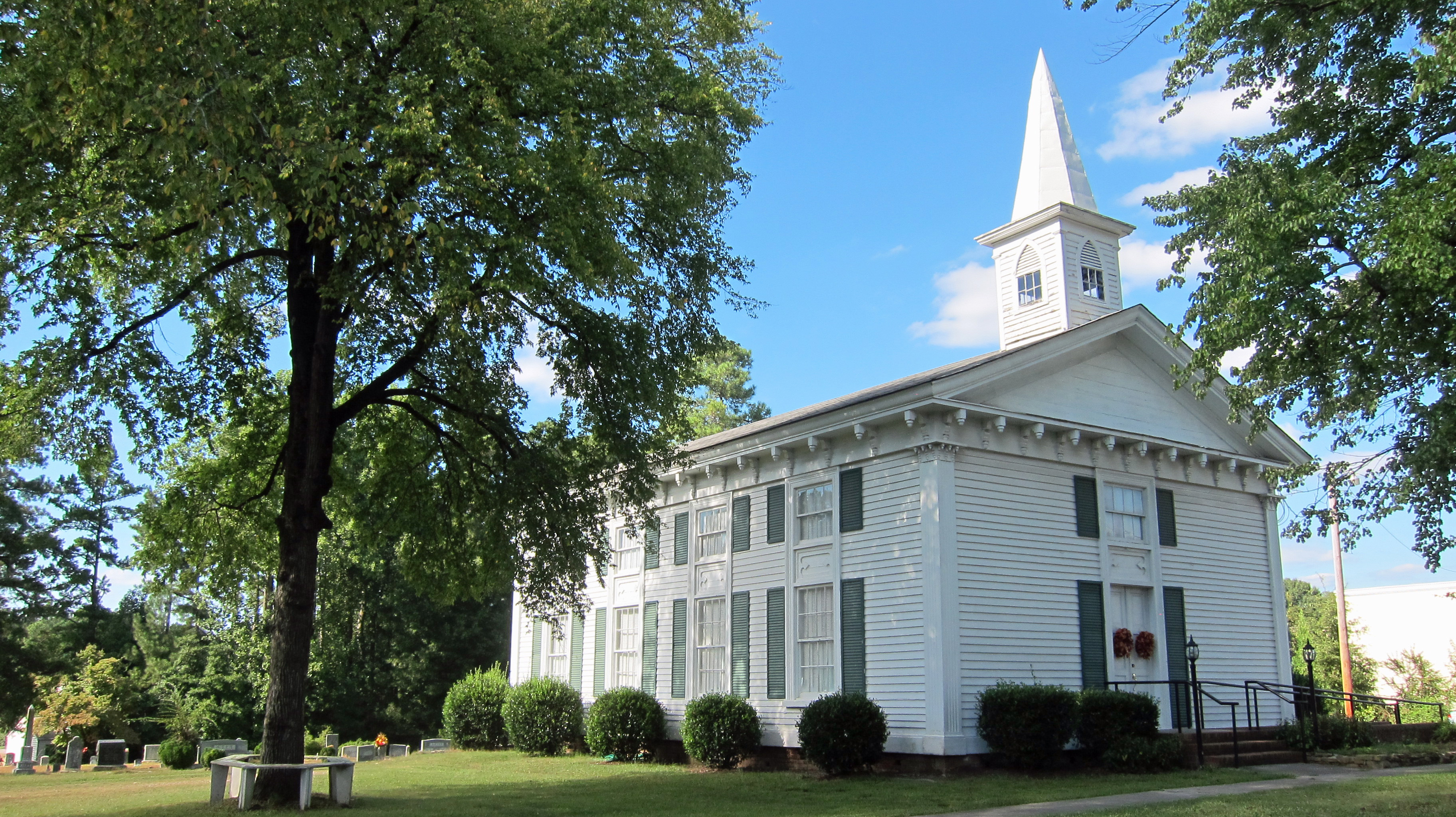

- Location within North Carolina Location within the United States
- Location: 1350 S. Main St., Forestville, North Carolina
- Coordinates: 35°57′38″N 78°31′12″W
- Area: 2.3 acres (0.93 ha)
- Built: 1860
- Architect: Holt, Jacob W.
- Architectural style: Greek Revival, Italianate
- NRHP reference No.: 84000118
- Added to NRHP: 25 October 1984

Forestville Baptist Church is a historic Baptist church located at Wake Forest in Wake County, North Carolina, a satellite town of the state capital Raleigh. Constructed in 1860, the church building is a combination of Greek Revival and Italianate style architecture. The building may be attributed to Jacob W. Holt, or his brother, Thomas J. Holt, architect with the Raleigh and Gaston Railroad.

In October 1984, Forestville Baptist Church was listed on the National Register of Historic Places.

== See also ==
- List of Registered Historic Places in North Carolina
