= John Van Zandt =

American activist (died 1847)

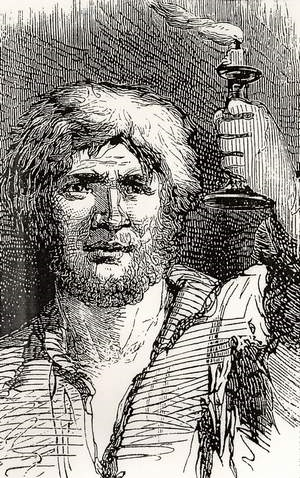
The only known possible image of John Van Zandt is a drawing of John Van Trompe from Uncle Tom's Cabin, believed based on Van Zandt.

John Van Zandt (died 1847) was an American abolitionist who aided the Underground Railroad resistance movement in Ohio after he had been a slaveholder in Kentucky. Sued for monetary damages by a slaveholder whose escaped slaves he had aided, he was a party to Jones v. Van Zandt (1847), a case by which abolitionists intended to challenge the constitutionality of slavery. The US Supreme Court decided the case against Van Zandt and upheld the right of the US Congress and the obligation of the US government to protect slavery, as it was established under the US Constitution. Van Zandt was ruined financially by the decision and died later that year.

== Background ==
While living in Evendale, Ohio, Van Zandt often illegally harbored slaves in the basement of his house and helped them escape to the North. In the 1840s, he was caught and was excommunicated from the Sharonville Methodist Episcopal Church, which had joined the Southern portion of the national congregations, although he had been a trustee and helped found it. His anti-slavery activities was judged by the church to be "immoral and un-Christian conduct." However, he continued to harbor slaves although he was caught again.

Van Zandt was charged for monetary damages by Wharton Jones, a slaveholder who had lost his property. The case that became known as Jones v. Van Zandt (1847) was settled by the US Supreme Court. Abolitionists pressed the case to challenge the constitutionality of slavery. Van Zandt was defended by Salmon P. Chase, a future US Treasury Secretary for President Abraham Lincoln and the US Chief Justice from 1864 to 1873.

However, the Court ruled against Van Zandt. In a decision by Chase's predecessor, Chief Justice Roger B. Taney, the Court determined that slavery was protected by the US Constitution, which gave the US government the right and the obligation to support it, and so the Fugitive Slave Act of 1793 was constitutional. States could determine whether slavery would be legal within their borders.

In the years of challenging his legal case, Van Zandt lost all his land and property. He had to place his 11 children with relatives across the country and died later that year.

== Aftermath ==
Hoping to settle the issue of slavery, Taney increased sectional tensions in the nation. The South pushed through the new Fugitive Slave Act of 1850, which required states to support enforcement and increased the penalties for aiding escaped slaves. That further raised sectional tensions in the country.

== Legacy and honors ==
On June 19, 2005, the Sharonville United Methodist Church (the pro-slavery Southern faction rejoined the mainline Methodist Church in the 20th century) attracted national press attention by posthumously restoring Van Zandt's membership. About a dozen Van Zandt descendants traveled to the city to accept a formal letter of apology by the church for expelling their ancestor for his anti-slavery activities.

== In popular culture ==
Van Zandt was believed to have been the basis for the character of Van Trompe in Harriet Beecher Stowe's bestselling Uncle Tom's Cabin (1852), which helped rouse anti-slavery activists.

"A Key To Uncle Tom's Cabin" by Harriet Beecher Stowe, 1853, page 36 of Chapter V., titled "Eliza", affirming John Van Zandt was her prototype for the character, John Van Trompe, in "Uncle Tom's Cabin".

Quote by Harriet Beecher Stowe: "They drove about 10 miles on a solitary road, crossed the creek at a very dangerous fording, and presented themselves, at midnight, at the house of John Van Zandt, a noble-minded Kentuckian, who had performed the good deed which the author, in her story, ascribes to Van Tromp(e)." [Van Trompe in "Uncle Tom's Cabin"]
