= Chase City High School =

Historic buildings in Virginia, US

- U.S. National Register of Historic Places
- Virginia Landmarks Register
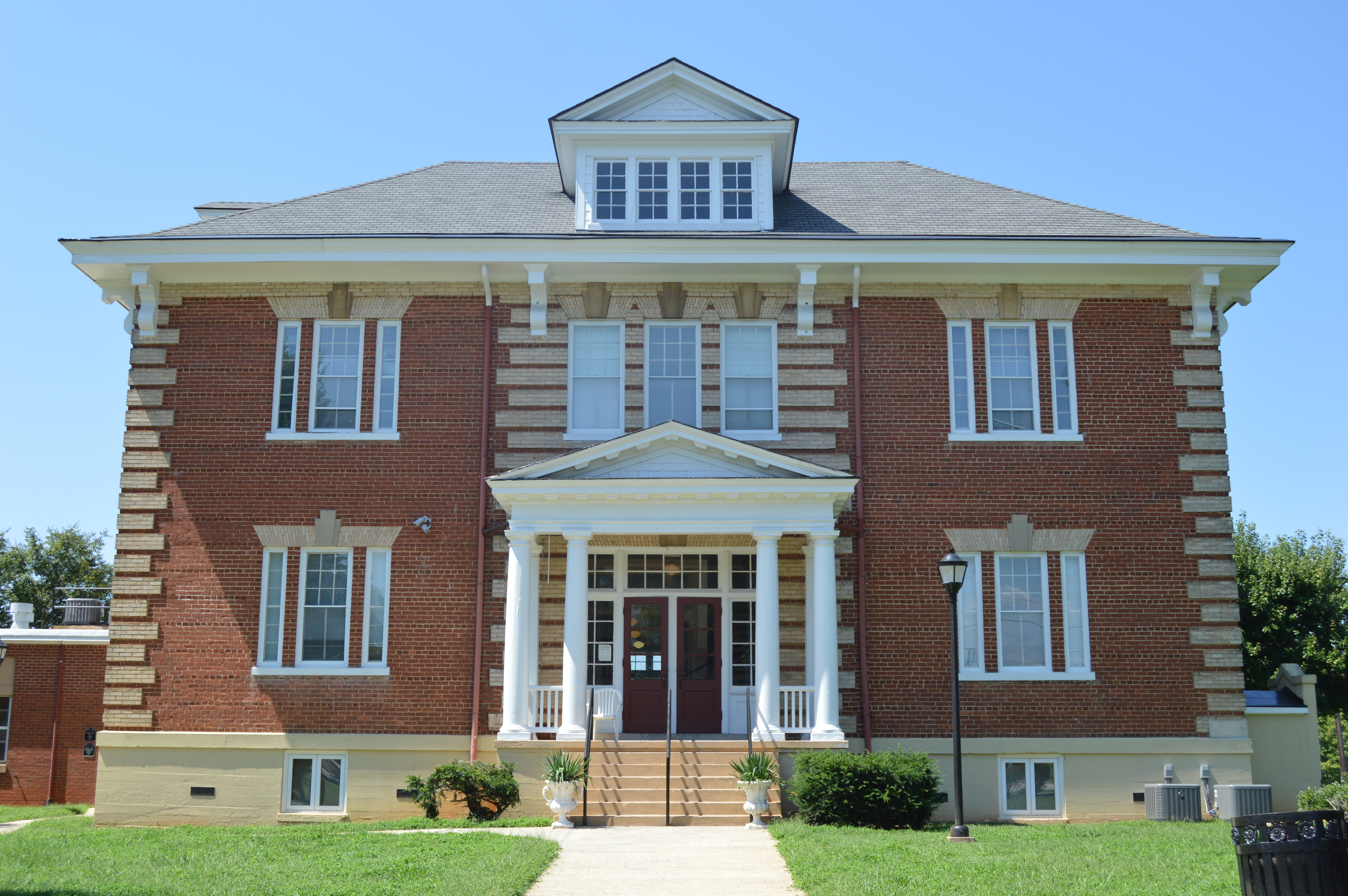
- Front of the 1908 section

- Location within Virginia Location within the United States
- Location: 132 Endly St., Chase City, Virginia
- Coordinates: 36°47′52″N 78°27′43″W
- Area: 1.1 acres (0.45 ha)
- Built: 1908, 1917, 1939
- Architect: H.H. Huggins
- Architectural style: Colonial Revival
- NRHP reference No.: 00000482
- VLR No.: 186-0002

Significant dates
- Added to NRHP: May 11, 2000
- Designated VLR: September 17, 1997

Chase City High School, now known as Maple Manor Apartments, is a historic high school complex located at Chase City, Mecklenburg County, Virginia. The school building was built in 1908 and expanded in 1917. It consists of two two-story, brick Colonial Revival-style buildings connected by a one-story connector building built in 1960. Also on the property is a contributing two-story, rectangular, brick building constructed in 1917 for vocational agriculture classes. A one-story, concrete block addition to the building was constructed about 1939. The school closed in 1980, and in 1991 the complex was sensitively rehabilitated for use as apartments for the elderly.

It was listed on the National Register of Historic Places in 1997.
