= MacCallum More and Hudgins House Historic District =

Historic district in Virginia, United States

- U.S. National Register of Historic Places
- U.S. Historic district
- Virginia Landmarks Register
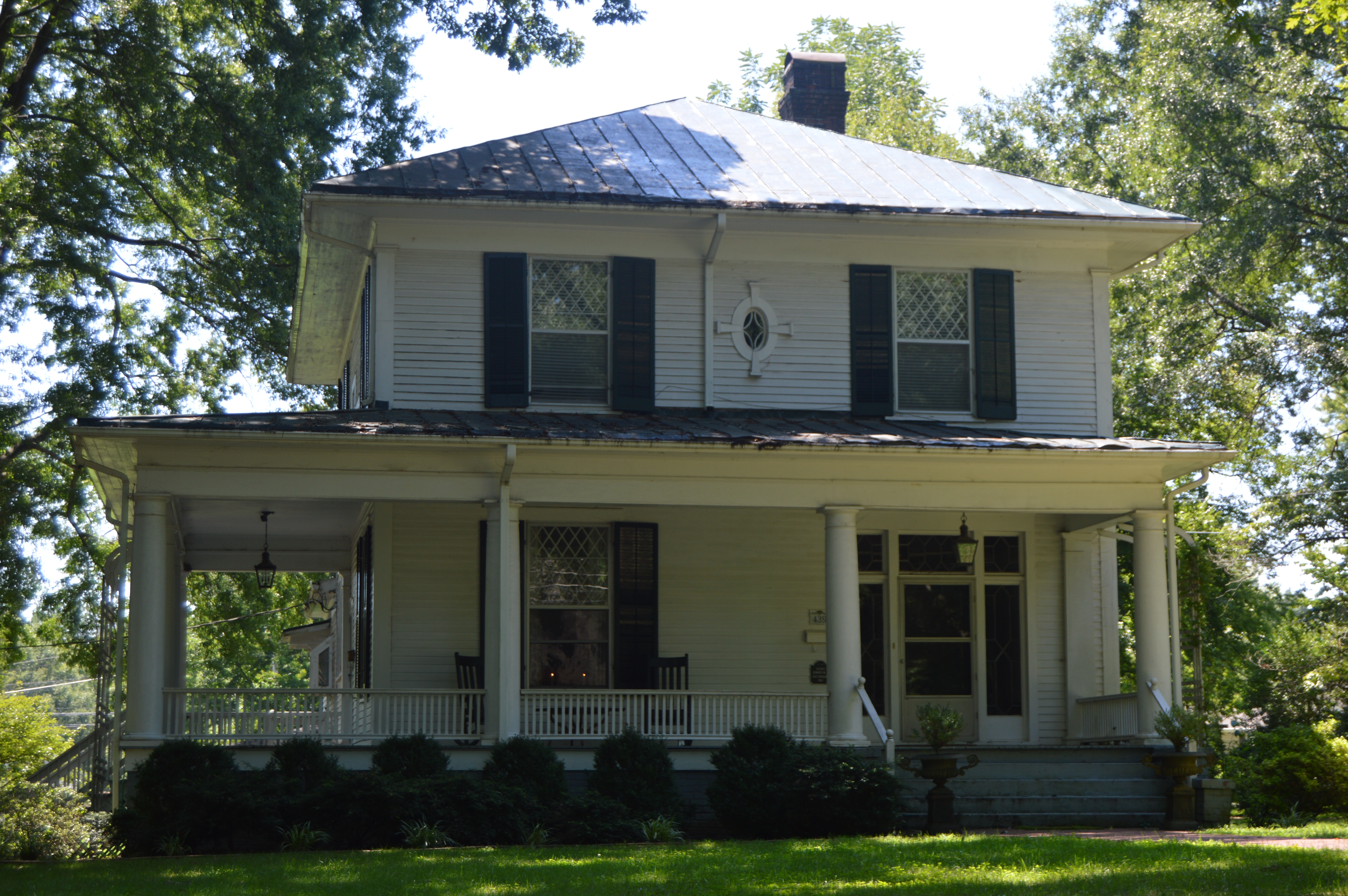
- Front of the Hudgins House

- Location within Virginia Location within the United States
- Location: 603 Hudgins St. and 439 Walker St., Chase City, Virginia
- Coordinates: 36°48′06″N 78°27′26″W
- Area: 6 acres (2.4 ha)
- Built: 1910, 1929, c. 1941
- Architect: Carl Max Lindner, Sr., Charles F. Gillette
- Architectural style: Colonial Revival
- NRHP reference No.: 09001051
- VLR No.: 186-5020, 186-5001

Significant dates
- Added to NRHP: September 10, 2010
- Designated VLR: September 17, 2009

MacCallum More and Hudgins House Historic District is a pair of historic homes and national historic district located at Chase City, Mecklenburg County, Virginia. The district encompasses three contributing buildings and one contributing site They include the Hudqins-Rutledqe House built in 1910. The house is a two-story, frame dwelling with a symmetrical two-bay façade that combines Colonial Revival and Neoclassical elements. MacCallum More was designed by noted Richmond architect Carl M. Lindner and built in 1929. It is Colonial Revival in style with a three-bay, symmetrical façade and a side gable roof. It has a two-story central block flanked by one-story wings. Associated with it is a 1 1/2-story, Guest Cottage built about 1941. The houses are located in landscaped gardens designed by Charles Gillette in 1927.

The property includes the MacCallum More Museum and Gardens.

It was listed on the National Register of Historic Places in 2010.
