= Chase City, Virginia =

- Town
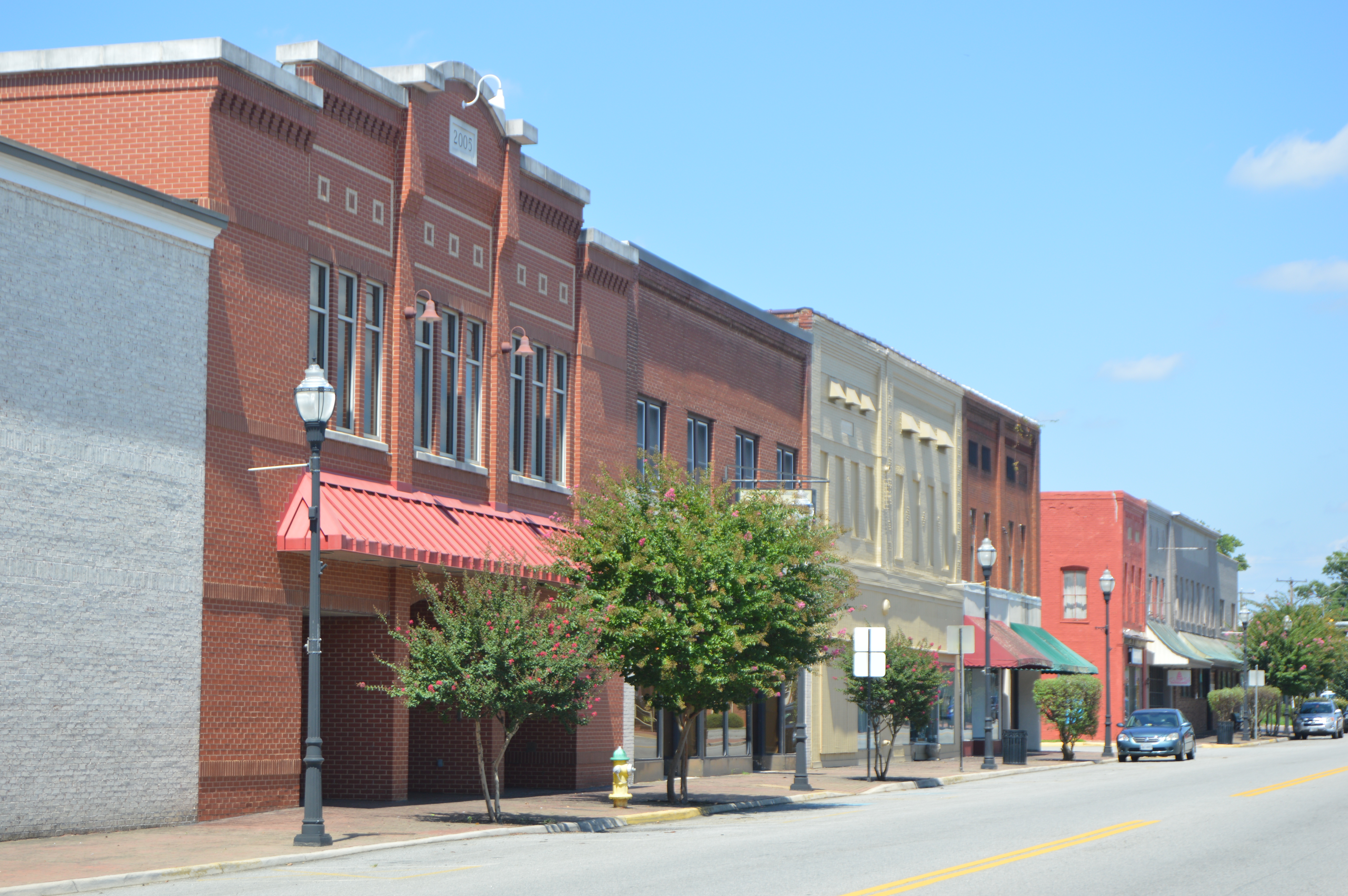
- Main Street downtown

- Seal

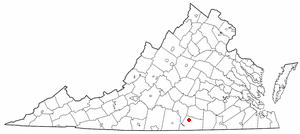
- Location of Chase City, Virginia
- Coordinates: 36°47′58″N 78°27′40″W
- Country: United States
- State: Virginia
- County: Mecklenburg

Government
  - Mayor: Alden Fahringer
  - Vice Mayor: James Bohannon
  - Town Council: Brenda Hatcher; B.J. Mull; Marshall E. Whitaker; Michelle Wilson; Pauline Keeton
  - Town Manager: C.F. “Dusty” Forbes
  - Police Chief: J. A. Jordon

Area
  - Total: 2.19 sq mi (5.66 km^{2})
  - Land: 2.19 sq mi (5.66 km^{2})
  - Water: 0 sq mi (0.00 km^{2})
- Elevation: 571 ft (174 m)

Population (2010)
  - Total: 2,053
  - Estimate (2019): 2,215
  - Density: 1,012.9/sq mi (391.09/km^{2})
- Time zone: UTC-5 (Eastern (EST))
  - Summer (DST): UTC-4 (EDT)
- ZIP code: 23924
- Area code: 434
- FIPS code: 51-14984
- GNIS feature ID: 1464752
- Website: Official website

Chase City is a town in Mecklenburg County, Virginia, United States. Chase City was incorporated in 1873 and named for Salmon P. Chase, United States Chief Justice and Lincoln's Secretary of the Treasury. The population was 2,053 at the 2020 census. Tobacco and other crops are grown nearby.

== History ==
The Chase City High School, MacCallum More and Hudgins House Historic District, and Shadow Lawn are listed on the National Register of Historic Places.

== Geography ==
Chase City is located at 36°47′58″N 78°27′40″W (36.799312, -78.461019).

According to the United States Census Bureau, the town has a total area of 2.2 square miles (5.7 km^{2}), all of it land.

=== Climate ===
Climate data for Chase City, Virginia (1991–2020 normals, extremes 1947–present)
| Month | Jan | Feb | Mar | Apr | May | Jun | Jul | Aug | Sep | Oct | Nov | Dec | Year |
|---|---|---|---|---|---|---|---|---|---|---|---|---|---|
| Record high °F (°C) | 81 (27) | 80 (27) | 88 (31) | 95 (35) | 105 (41) | 103 (39) | 107 (42) | 105 (41) | 106 (41) | 98 (37) | 89 (32) | 81 (27) | 107 (42) |
| Mean daily maximum °F (°C) | 49.4 (9.7) | 52.7 (11.5) | 60.3 (15.7) | 70.6 (21.4) | 77.6 (25.3) | 85.2 (29.6) | 88.9 (31.6) | 87.1 (30.6) | 81.0 (27.2) | 71.0 (21.7) | 61.0 (16.1) | 52.3 (11.3) | 69.8 (21.0) |
| Daily mean °F (°C) | 39.3 (4.1) | 41.7 (5.4) | 48.3 (9.1) | 57.8 (14.3) | 66.1 (18.9) | 74.3 (23.5) | 78.4 (25.8) | 76.6 (24.8) | 70.2 (21.2) | 59.0 (15.0) | 49.2 (9.6) | 41.8 (5.4) | 58.6 (14.8) |
| Mean daily minimum °F (°C) | 29.1 (−1.6) | 30.8 (−0.7) | 36.2 (2.3) | 44.9 (7.2) | 54.7 (12.6) | 63.5 (17.5) | 67.8 (19.9) | 66.2 (19.0) | 59.5 (15.3) | 46.9 (8.3) | 37.3 (2.9) | 31.3 (−0.4) | 47.3 (8.5) |
| Record low °F (°C) | −3 (−19) | −1 (−18) | 10 (−12) | 15 (−9) | 31 (−1) | 40 (4) | 49 (9) | 46 (8) | 35 (2) | 22 (−6) | 12 (−11) | 0 (−18) | −3 (−19) |
| Average precipitation inches (mm) | 3.76 (96) | 3.27 (83) | 4.07 (103) | 3.66 (93) | 4.01 (102) | 4.26 (108) | 4.23 (107) | 4.09 (104) | 4.65 (118) | 3.45 (88) | 3.18 (81) | 3.77 (96) | 46.40 (1,179) |
| Average snowfall inches (cm) | 3.0 (7.6) | 0.8 (2.0) | 0.4 (1.0) | 0.0 (0.0) | 0.0 (0.0) | 0.0 (0.0) | 0.0 (0.0) | 0.0 (0.0) | 0.0 (0.0) | 0.0 (0.0) | 0.0 (0.0) | 0.8 (2.0) | 5.0 (13) |
| Average precipitation days (≥ 0.01 in) | 7.7 | 7.0 | 8.6 | 8.3 | 8.9 | 8.5 | 8.7 | 7.9 | 6.8 | 6.8 | 6.8 | 7.8 | 93.8 |
| Average snowy days (≥ 0.1 in) | 1.1 | 0.8 | 0.1 | 0.0 | 0.0 | 0.0 | 0.0 | 0.0 | 0.0 | 0.0 | 0.0 | 0.6 | 2.6 |
Source: NOAA

== Demographics ==
Historical population
| Census | Pop. | Note | %± |
|---|---|---|---|
| 1880 | 251 | | — |
| 1890 | 618 | | 146.2% |
| 1900 | 542 | | −12.3% |
| 1910 | 1,662 | | 206.6% |
| 1920 | 1,646 | | −1.0% |
| 1930 | 1,590 | | −3.4% |
| 1940 | 1,896 | | 19.2% |
| 1950 | 2,519 | | 32.9% |
| 1960 | 3,207 | | 27.3% |
| 1970 | 2,909 | | −9.3% |
| 1980 | 2,749 | | −5.5% |
| 1990 | 2,442 | | −11.2% |
| 2000 | 2,457 | | 0.6% |
| 2010 | 2,351 | | −4.3% |
| 2020 | 2,053 | | −12.7% |
U.S. Decennial Census

As of the census of 2000, there were 2,457 people, 1,099 households, and 658 families living in the town. The population density was 1,121.2 people per square mile (433.2/km^{2}). There were 1,249 housing units at an average density of 570.0 per square mile (220.2/km^{2}). The racial makeup of the town was 53.52% White, 44.65% African American, 0.20% Native American, 0.12% Asian,0.04% Pacific Islander, 0.49% from other races, and 0.98% from two or more races. Hispanic or Latino of any race were 1.34% of the population.

There were 1,099 households, out of which 26.1% had children under the age of 18 living with them, 36.6% were married couples living together, 18.7% had a female householder with no husband present, and 40.1% were non-families. 36.7% of all households were made up of individuals, and 21.7% had someone living alone who was 65 years of age or older. The average household size was 2.24 and the average family size was 2.93.

In the town, the population was spread out, with 25.4% under the age of 18, 6.8% from 18 to 24, 23.5% from 25 to 44, 22.5% from 45 to 64, and 21.8% who were 65 years of age or older. The median age was 40 years. For every 100 females there were 80.1 males. For every 100 females age 18 and over, there were 74.5 males.

The median income for a household in the town was $22,193, and the median income for a family was $32,700. Males had a median income of $26,712 versus $18,750 for females. The per capita income for the town was $13,559. About 15.9% of families and 22.7% of the population were below the poverty line, including 27.4% of those under age 18 and 20.3% of those age 65 or over.

== Notable people ==
- Rufus Meadows, pitcher for the MLB's Cincinnati Reds
- Michael Tucker, MLB Player (born in South Boston, Va, Raised in Chase City, Va)
