= Joseph Prosper Ourdan =

American engraver 1828 – 1881

Joseph Prosper Ourdan (February 16, 1828 – May 10, 1881) was an American engraver.

Ourdan was born in New York City and died in Washington, D.C. He served his apprenticeship as an engraver with Waterman Ormsby, of New York. Over his own name he engraved in line some good portraits and illustrative works for the book publishers; and the firm of Packard & Ourdan produced portraits in mezzotint. But he early became interested in bank-note work and was in the employ of the Continental and the National bank note companies, of New York, and the American Bank Note Company, of Philadelphia. Ourdan then entered the service of the Treasury Department in Washington and in time became the chief of the Bureau of Engraving and Printing. While in this bureau he engraved the portraits of a number of persons notable during the Civil War; including among these the head of Salmon P. Chase on the one-dollar bill, and the head of Francis E. Spinner on the fractional currency. He engraved other admirable portraits for the bank-note companies.
