= Semi-Colon Club =

Cincinnati literary organization (1832–1850)

The Semi-Colon Club was an informal organization of talented writers in Cincinnati, Ohio during the mid-19th century. Harriet Beecher Stowe was a member of the club while living in the city from 1832 until 1850. Stowe's experiences in Cincinnati and her time in the club were major factors in her work Uncle Tom's Cabin.

Stowe's uncles lived in Cincinnati and called on the family at their home often. One day, Harriet Beecher's uncle Samuel Foote, who was a brother of Harriet's late mother, Roxanna Foote, invited her and her older sister, Catherine, to join his favorite club, the Semi-Colon Club. It was a literary club, made up of some of the best minds in Cincinnati, including future Chief Justice of the United States Salmon P. Chase; Judge James Hall, who was editor of Western Monthly Magazine, novelist Caroline Lee Hentz, and the couple Calvin Ellis Stowe and Eliza Tyler Stowe. Other members included pioneering physicians Daniel Drake of Cincinnati, who founded the first medical school in the city, and Elizabeth Blackwell, who later became the first American female physician and, owing to her English origins, the first practicing female physician in England. Catherine Beecher was an early advocate of education for girls, helping to found several schools and colleges for women.

Notable about the Semi-Colon Club was the mixing of the sexes in literary activity and recitation. Stowe presented her early works to the entire group, even though the Victorian social standards of the day would have excluded her from speaking in public to a group that included men. Not until after the Civil War did Stowe embark on a speaking tour where she publicly spoke to audiences of men and women.
