= Shadow Lawn (Chase City, Virginia) =

Historic house in Virginia, United States

- U.S. National Register of Historic Places
- Virginia Landmarks Register
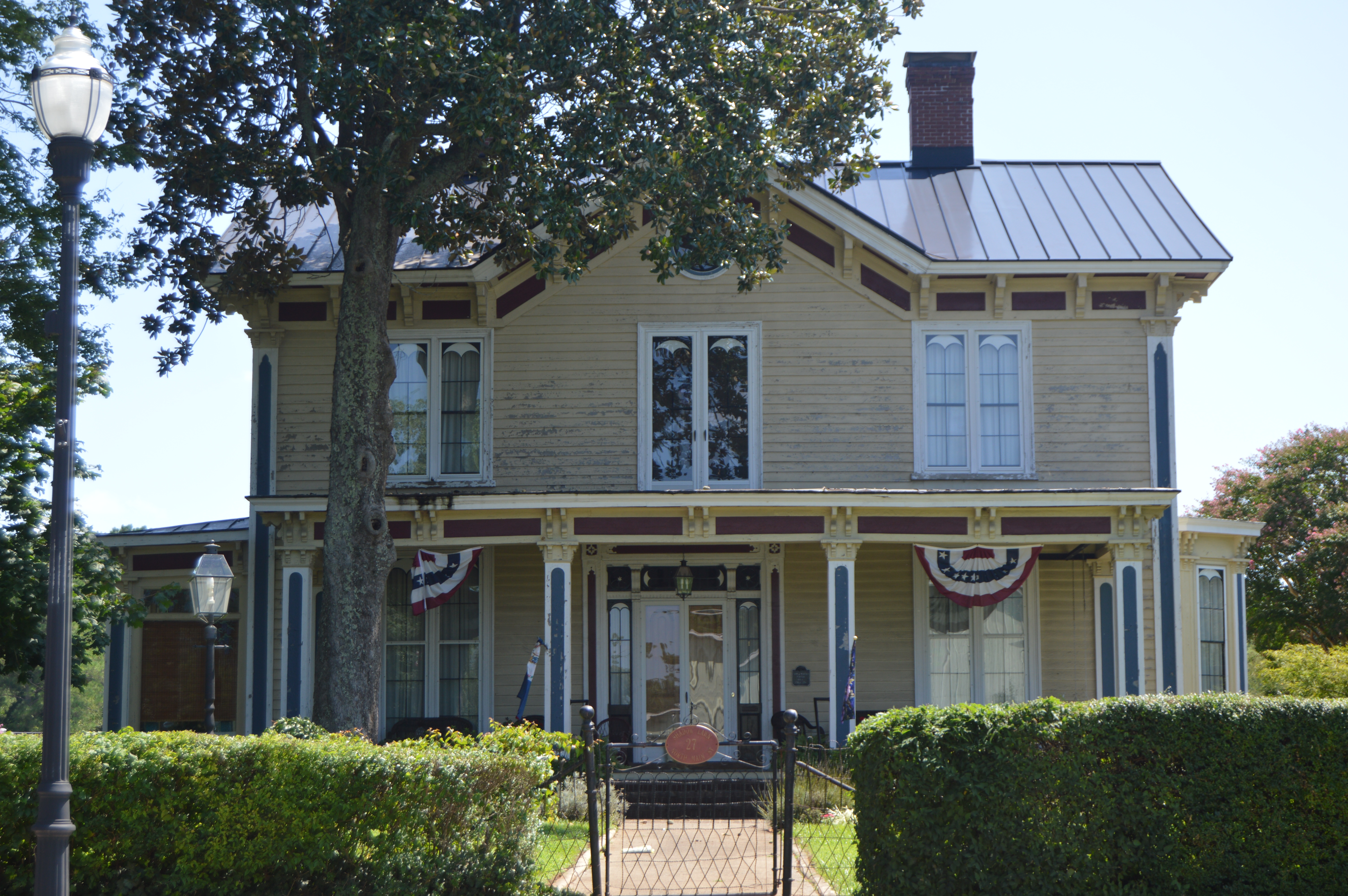
- Front of the house

- Location within Virginia Location within the United States
- Location: 27 N. Main St., Chase City, Virginia
- Coordinates: 36°47′50″N 78°27′30″W
- Area: Less than 1 acre (0.40 ha)
- Built: c. 1834, 1869-1870
- Architect: Jacob W. Holt
- Architectural style: Italianate
- NRHP reference No.: 82001824
- VLR No.: 186-5004

Significant dates
- Added to NRHP: October 19, 1982
- Designated VLR: December 15, 1981

Shadow Lawn is a historic home located at Chase City, Mecklenburg County, Virginia. The original section dates to about 1834, with the main Italianate style front section designed by Jacob W. Holt and built in 1869–1870. The house is two stories tall and three bays wide with a cross gable roof. It has a traditional central-passage, double-pile plan.

It was listed on the National Register of Historic Places in 1982.
