= National Register of Historic Places listings in Mecklenburg County, Virginia =

Location of Mecklenburg County in Virginia

This is a list of the National Register of Historic Places listings in Mecklenburg County, Virginia.

This is intended to be a complete list of the properties and districts on the National Register of Historic Places in Mecklenburg County, Virginia, United States. The locations of National Register properties and districts for which the latitude and longitude coordinates are included below, may be seen in an online map.

There are 29 properties and districts listed on the National Register in the county, including 1 National Historic Landmark. Another property was once listed but has been removed.

This National Park Service list is complete through NPS recent listings posted March 6, 2026.

== Current listings ==
	Name on the Register	Image	Date listed	Location	City or town	Description
1	Averett School and Wharton Memorial Baptist Church and Cemetery		April 13, 2021 (#100006387)	57 White House Rd. 36°34′39″N 78°39′21″W	Nelson	
2	Boyd's Tavern	Boyd's Tavern	September 29, 1976 (#76002113)	Washington St. 36°40′04″N 78°23′18″W	Boydton	
3	Boydton Historic District	Boydton Historic District	May 16, 2002 (#02000511)	Roughly the Boydton corporate limits except for the section including and northwest of U.S. Route 58; 36°40′00″N 78°23′20″W	Boydton	
4	Buffalo Springs Historical Archeological District	Buffalo Springs Historical Archeological District	June 12, 1998 (#98000603)	Buffalo Springs Rd., north of U.S. Route 58; 36°38′54″N 78°39′45″W	Buffalo Junction	
5	Cedar Grove	Cedar Grove	August 16, 2010 (#10000560)	138 Lewis Mill Rd. 36°33′46″N 78°34′53″W	Clarksville	
6	Chase City High School	Chase City High School	May 11, 2000 (#00000482)	132 Endly St. 36°47′53″N 78°27′43″W	Chase City	
7	Chase City Warehouse and Commercial Historic District		December 11, 2020 (#100005923)	North Main, East 5th, West 4th, East 2nd, and East Sycamore Sts. 36°48′04″N 78°27′34″W	Chase City	
8	Clarksville Historic District	Clarksville Historic District	June 6, 2002 (#02000625)	Roughly along Virginia Ave., from Rose Hill Ave., Ferry St., East St., and 2nd St. 36°37′26″N 78°33′29″W	Clarksville	
9	Colonial Theatre	Colonial Theatre	May 19, 2003 (#03000448)	220 S. Mecklenburg Ave. 36°43′29″N 78°07′49″W	South Hill	
10	Elm Hill	Elm Hill	July 27, 1979 (#79003053)	Southeast of Baskerville off State Route 4; 36°36′40″N 78°17′36″W	Baskerville	
11	Elm Hill Archaeological Site	Elm Hill Archaeological Site	March 14, 1985 (#85000569)	Northern side of the Roanoke River, 1 mile (1.6 km) below the Robert H. Kerr Dam; 36°36′41″N 78°16′09″W	Castle Heights	
12	Eureka	Eureka	September 17, 1980 (#80004200)	Southeast of Baskerville; 36°37′59″N 78°14′07″W	Baskerville	
13	John Groom Elementary School	John Groom Elementary School	February 13, 2018 (#100002138)	1050 Plank Rd. 36°43′35″N 78°08′44″W	South Hill	
14	La Crosse Hotel	La Crosse Hotel	September 12, 2008 (#08000876)	201 Central Ave. 36°41′44″N 78°05′36″W	La Crosse	
15	Long Grass	Long Grass	July 21, 1995 (#95000894)	Epps Fork Rd. 36°33′10″N 78°20′39″W	Eppes Fork	
16	Mecklenburg County Courthouse	Mecklenburg County Courthouse	July 17, 1975 (#75002025)	Southwestern corner of the junction of U.S. Route 58 and State Route 92; 36°40′01″N 78°23′19″W	Boydton	
17	MacCallum More and Hudgins House Historic District	MacCallum More and Hudgins House Historic District	September 10, 2010 (#09001051)	603 Hudgins St. and 439 Walker St. 36°48′08″N 78°27′22″W	Chase City	
18	On the Hill	On the Hill	February 5, 2014 (#13001164)	982 Jefferson St. 36°39′56″N 78°23′37″W	Boydton	
19	Park View High School		August 15, 2025 (#100012137)	205 Park View Circle; 36°42′10″N 78°10′57″W	South Hill	
20	Prestwould	Prestwould	October 1, 1969 (#69000260)	North of Clarksville; 36°38′59″N 78°33′51″W	Clarksville	Designated a National Historic Landmark July 31, 2003
21	Red Fox Farm	Red Fox Farm	June 10, 1993 (#93000508)	Eastern side of Skipwith Rd., 0.7 miles (1.1 km) south of its junction with Hanford Rd. 36°42′51″N 78°29′45″W	Skipwith	
22	Clark Royster House	Clark Royster House	December 16, 1996 (#96001455)	300 Rose Hill Ave. 36°37′39″N 78°33′28″W	Clarksville	
23	Rudd Branch Ridge-Complexes Nos. 1 and 2		May 8, 2003 (#03000396)	Address Restricted	Boydton	
24	Shadow Lawn	Shadow Lawn	October 19, 1982 (#82001824)	27 N. Main St. 36°47′50″N 78°27′29″W	Chase City	
25	South Hill Commercial Historic District	South Hill Commercial Historic District	November 24, 2017 (#100001853)	Mecklenburg Ave. and Franklin and W. Danville Sts. 36°43′32″N 78°07′46″W	South Hill	
26	Sunnyside	Sunnyside	December 6, 1996 (#96001452)	104 Shiney Rock Rd. 36°36′49″N 78°34′09″W	Clarksville	
27	Patrick Robert Sydnor Log Cabin	Patrick Robert Sydnor Log Cabin	August 30, 2007 (#07000896)	Junction of Wilbourne and Morgan Farm Rds. 36°39′40″N 78°32′55″W	Clarksville	
28	O.H.P. Tanner House	O.H.P. Tanner House	August 26, 2011 (#11000606)	3199 Old St. Tammany Rd. 36°36′58″N 78°08′08″W	La Crosse	
29	Judge Henry Wood Jr. House	Judge Henry Wood Jr. House	September 24, 1999 (#99001201)	105 6th St. 36°37′30″N 78°33′34″W	Clarksville	

== Former listing ==
	Name on the Register	Image	Date listed	Date removed	Location	City or town	Description
1	Moss Tobacco Factory		May 21, 1979 (#79003054)	March 19, 2001	Main and 7th Streets	Clarksville	Demolished February 1980

== See also ==
- List of National Historic Landmarks in Virginia
- National Register of Historic Places listings in Virginia
