= Elm Hill =

Elm Hill may refer to:

- Elm Hill, New Brunswick, the last surviving black community in New Brunswick
- Elm Hill, Norwich, United Kingdom, an historic cobbled lane with buildings dating back to the Tudor ages
- Elm Hill (Newport, Tennessee), listed on the National Register of Historic Places in Cocke County, Tennessee
- Elm Hill (Baskerville, Virginia), listed on the National Register of Historic Places in Mecklenburg County, Virginia
- Elm Hill (Wheeling, West Virginia), listed on the National Register of Historic Places in Ohio County, West Virginia
