= Atlantic and Danville Railway =

Railroad in Virginia and North Carolina (1882–1962)

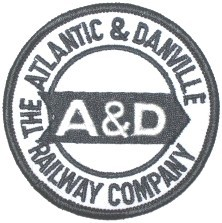

Overview
- Headquarters: Norfolk, Virginia
- Reporting mark: AD
- Locale: Virginia
- Dates of operation: 1882–1962
- Successor: Norfolk, Franklin and Danville Railway

Technical
- Track gauge: 4 ft 8 1/2 in (1,435 mm)
- Previous gauge: 3 ft (914 mm)
- Length: 203 miles (327 km)

The Atlantic and Danville Railway (reporting mark AD) was a Class I railroad which operated in Virginia and North Carolina. The company was founded in 1882 and opened its mainline between Portsmouth, Virginia and Danville, Virginia in 1890. The Southern Railway leased the company from 1899 to 1949. The Norfolk and Western Railway purchased the company in 1962 and reorganized it as the Norfolk, Franklin and Danville Railway.

== History ==
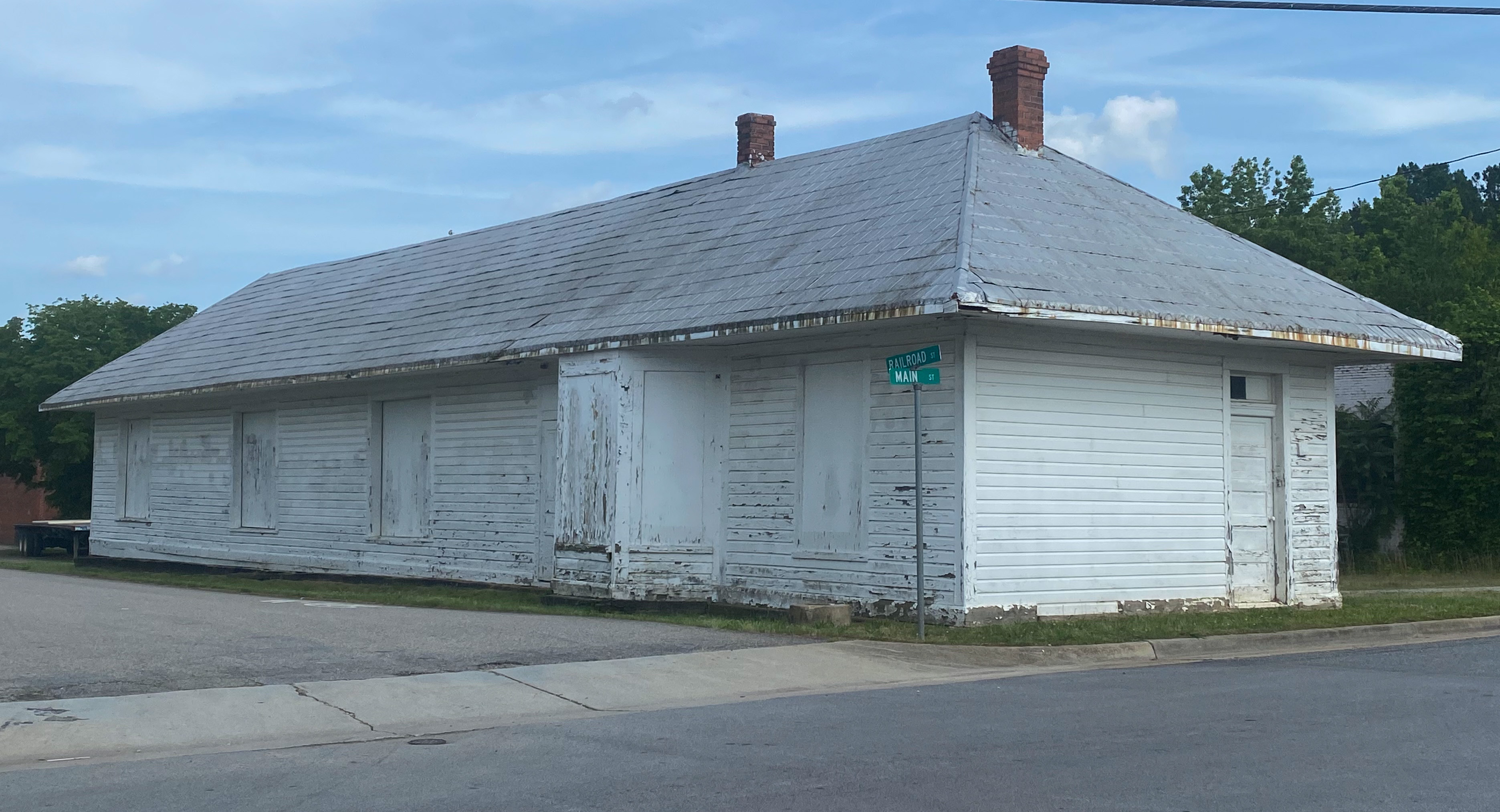
Brodnax Train Station on the Atlantic and Danville Railway

The Atlantic and Danville Railway was incorporated in 1882 and opened its mainline between Portsmouth and Danville in 1890. The Southern Railway leased the company from 1899 to 1949. A 3 ft (914 mm) branch line ran from Emporia, Virginia to Claremont, Virginia and interchanged with the Atlantic Coast Line Railroad. The Southern Railway discontinued service on this branch in 1932; the Gray Lumber Company continued to use it for logging operations until 1938.

After the Southern terminated the lease the Atlantic and Danville continued as an independent company for another dozen years. The company went bankrupt in 1960 and was purchased by the Norfolk and Western Railway in 1962. The N&W created a new subsidiary, the Norfolk, Franklin and Danville Railway, to operate the A&D line.

The former A&D line from West Norfolk to Suffolk is currently in operation as the Commonwealth Railway. The Tobacco Heritage Trail is built on the old Atlantic and Danville Railway right of way in Brodnax, Virginia and La Crosse to South Hill, Virginia.

== Stations ==
The Atlantic and Danville Railway had a 205-mile main line, Norfolk and Danville, in 1951. West Norfolk and Boon was a six-mile spur. The train main line had trains that left Norfolk at 10:01 PM and arrived in Danville at 5:45 AM the next day. Then left at Danville at 8:45 PM and arrived in Norfolk at 5:40 AM the next day.

- Norfolk and Danville
  - Norfolk
  - Portsmouth
  - Pinners Point, which now has Pinners Point Interchange.
  - Boone, a populated place in Chesapeake, Virginia
  - Suffolk
  - Holland
  - Franklin
  - Courtland
  - Drewryville
  - Emporia
  - Pleasant Shade, between where Virginia State Route 607 crosses the A&D and U.S. Route 58.
  - Lawrenceville
  - Brodnax
  - La Crosse
  - South Hill
  - Union Level
  - Baskerville
  - Boydton
  - Jeffress, where Virginia State Route 702 crosses the A&D.
  - Antlers, where Virginia State Route 678 crosses the A&D.
  - South Clarksville
  - Buffalo Junction
  - Virgilina
  - Denniston, where Virginia State Route 711 crosses the A&D.
  - Milton, stop for Milton, North Carolina
  - Danville
- West Norfolk and Boone
  - West Norfolk
  - Churchland
  - Boone

== Railroad Company in 1896 ==
The railroad company was organized as the Richmond and Mecklenburg which was operated by the Southern Railway in 1896. All but one of the board of Directors and the two officers lived in New York City, New York. The railroad employed 315 people in 1896, including the company officers, clerks, firemen, engine men, conductors, ticket agents, carpenters, foremen, laborers and telegraph operators and dispatchers. The trains carried passengers and mail and freight. Outbound freight consisted coal, lumber, and farm products such as flour, wheat, hay, tobacco and fruits and vegetables as well as livestock, meats, wool and leather. Inbound freight included petroleum, oil, naval stores, cast iron products, machinery, cement, brick, lime, agricultural tools, wagons, alcoholic beverages, furniture and housewares. Cars were equipped with Janney couplers and Westinghouse Air Brake Company brakes.

There was one injury to an employee in 1896. Western Union operated the telegraph on the track.
