= Skipwith baronets =

Title in the Baronetage of England

There have been three baronetcies created in the Baronetage of England for members of the Skipwith family of Skipwith, Yorkshire, which relocated to Lincolnshire in the 14th century. They were a successful court family, with one member, Margaret Skipwith, seen as a possible queen of England after the death of Henry VIII's third wife, Jane Seymour. One creation of the baronetcy is extant as of 2008.

The surname Skipwith is derived from Old English "sceap" (sheep) and Old Norse "vath" (ford or wading place). One ancient Skipwith coat of arms is blazoned "Argent, three bars Gules, in chief a greyhound courant Sable."

== Skipwith baronets, of Prestwould (1622) ==
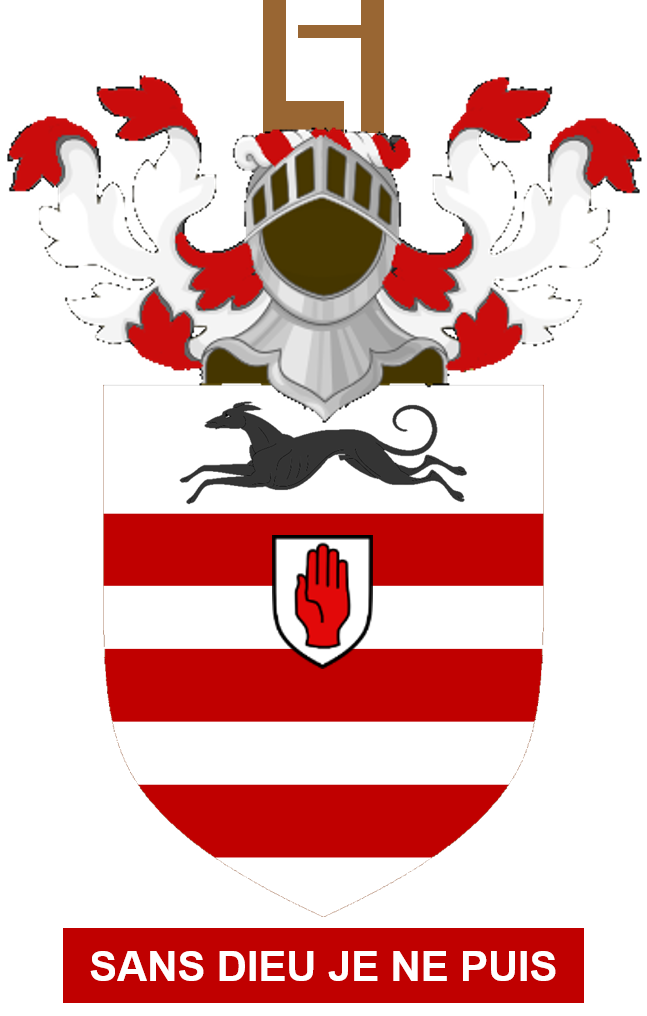
Arms: Argent three Bars Gules in chief a Greyhound courant Sable; Crest: A Turnstile proper; Motto: Sans Dieu Je Ne Puis (Without God I am not able)

The Skipwith Baronetcy, of Prestwould in the County of Leicester, was created in the Baronetage of England on 20 December 1622 for the son of Sir William Henry Skipwith, the poet Henry Skipwith (b. 21 Mar 1589, Prestwould Manor, Coates, Leicestershire). The third Baronet, Sir Grey, emigrated to Virginia in the middle of the 17th century. The next five Baronets were all born in Virginia. During the American Revolution, the seventh Baronet, Sir Peyton, continued to use his title throughout the war. His son, Grey, who was left an estate by Sir Thomas George Skipwith, 4th Baronet, moved to England by 1801. In 1805 after his father died, Grey became the eighth Baronet and sat as Member of Parliament for Warwickshire and Warwickshire South.

- Sir Henry Skipwith, 1st Baronet (died 1655) * his brothers-in-law were Sir Dudley Digges and Sir John Chicheley, making him an uncle by marriage to Commonwealth era Governor of Virginia, Edward Digges 1655–56, and Acting/Lt Gov. Sir Henry Chicheley. Sir Henry Chicheley was granted pass to leave for Virginia in April 1650, and must have been on one of the last ships to depart England that year. In fall 1650, the Commonwealth of England banned all trade and travel with the colonies, until an armed force was dispatched in fall 1651, that did not arrive until January 1652.
- Sir Henry Skipwith, 2nd Baronet (c. 1616–c. 1657 Wynter Plantation in Masulipatim, India) *various records show during the early 1640s he was under arrest by Parliament, including under charges for "being taken actually levying war against the Parliament." (interregnum records 1642/3)
- Sir Gray Skipwith, 3rd Baronet (1622–died c. 1671) emigrated and died in Virginia. He settled in Lancaster County across the river from his brother-in-law (via sister Diana Skipwith - 1621–1696) Major Edward Dale (burgess), which later became part of Middlesex County, Virginia.
- Sir William Skipwith, 4th Baronet (c. 1670–1736)
- Sir Grey Skipwith, 5th Baronet (1705–c. 1750)
- Sir William Skipwith, 6th Baronet (1707–1764)
- Sir Peyton Skipwith, 7th Baronet (1740–1805), upon his remarriage in 1788 moved to Mecklenburg County, Virginia and constructed Prestwould (which became home to four generations of the Virginia branch of the Skipwith family and now is the most intact and best documented plantation house surviving in Southside Virginia), with Elm Hill (in which this man lived before that construction and which his son Peyton Skipwith rebuilt) and a former slave cabin also now surviving as historic properties
- Sir Grey Skipwith, 8th Baronet (1771–1852)
- Sir Thomas George Skipwith, 9th Baronet (1803–1863)
- Sir Peyton Estoteville Skipwith, 10th Baronet (1857–1891)
- Sir Grey Humberston d'Estoteville Skipwith, 11th Baronet (1884–1950)
- Sir Patrick Alexander d'Estoteville Skipwith, 12th Baronet (1938–2016)
- Sir Alexander Sebastian Grey d'Estoteville Skipwith, 13th Baronet (born 1969).

== Skipwith baronets, of Newbold Hall (1670) ==
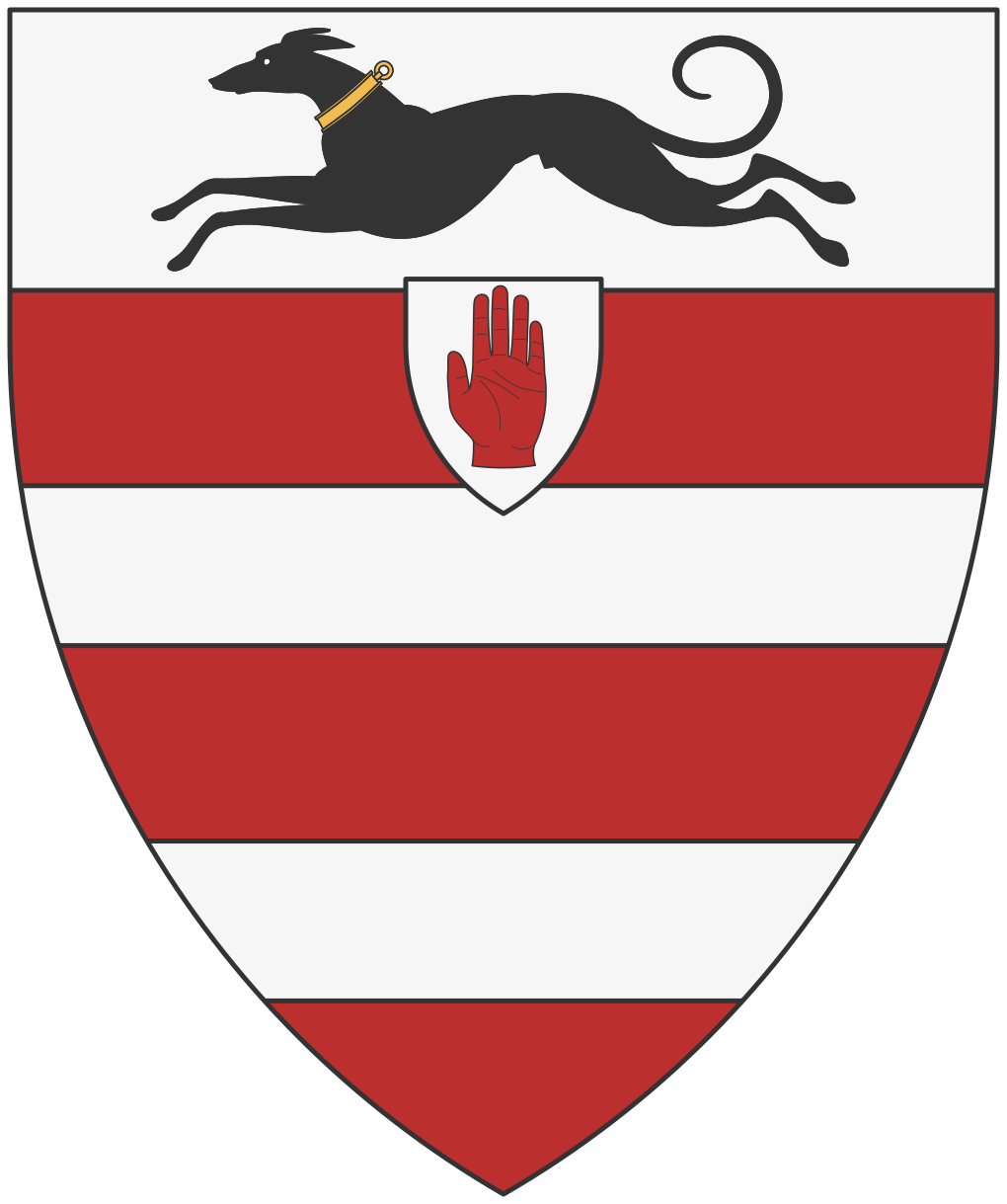
The coat of arms of the Skipwiths of Newbold Hall

The Skipwith Baronetcy, of Newbold Hall in the County of Warwick, was created in the Baronetage of England on 25 October 1670 for Fulwar Skipwith. The second Baronet represented Coventry in the House of Commons in 1713. The fourth Baronet was Member of Parliament for Warwickshire and Steyning. The title became extinct on the latter's death in 1790.

- Sir Fulwar Skipwith, 1st Baronet (died 1677)
- Sir Fulwar Skipwith, 2nd Baronet (1676–1728)
- Sir Francis Skipwith, 3rd Baronet (c. 1705–1778)
- Sir Thomas George Skipwith, 4th Baronet (c. 1735–1790)

The 4th Baronet left an estate to Grey Skipwith, the 8th Baronet of Prestwould.

== Skipwith baronets, of Metheringham (1678) ==
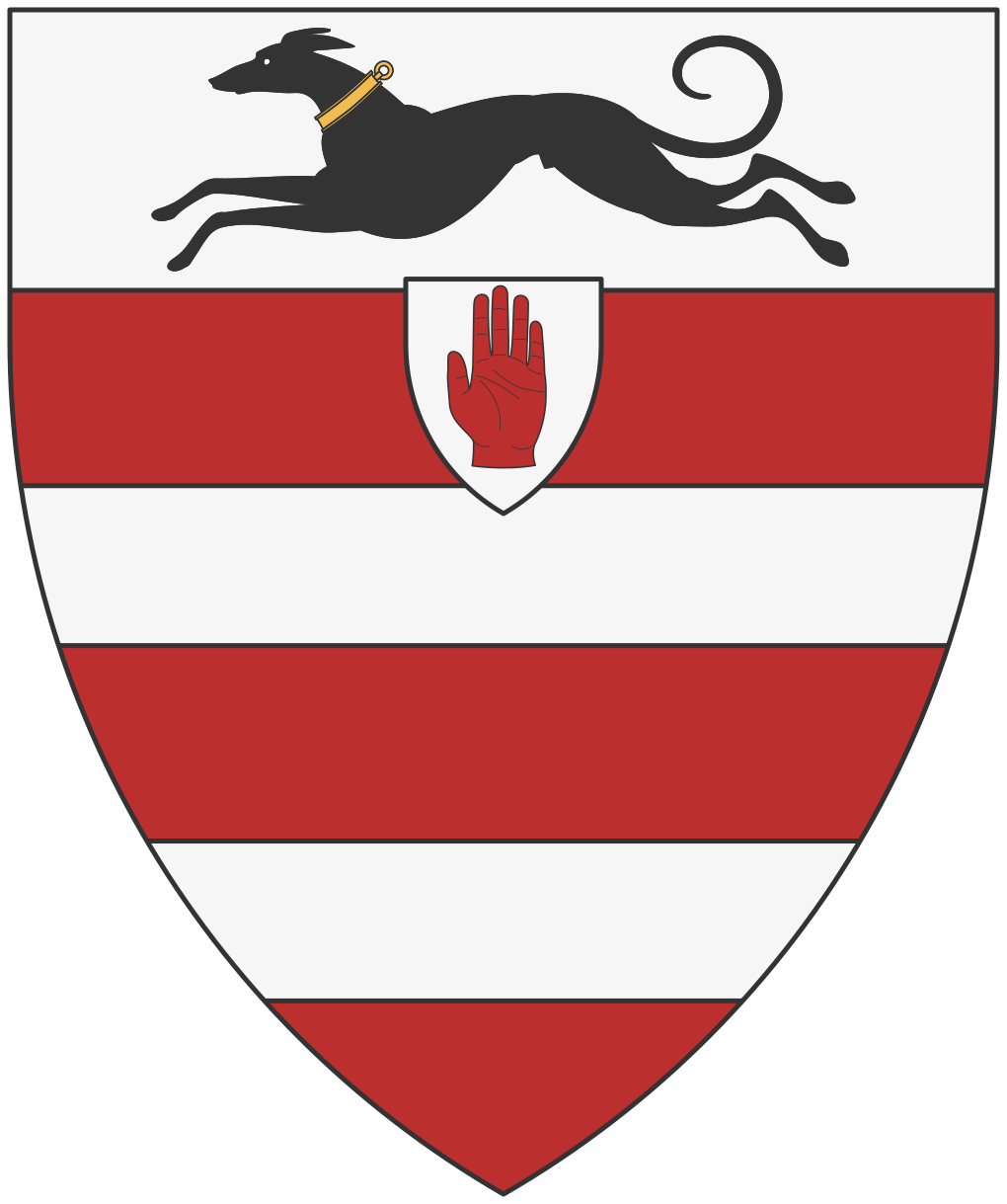
The coat of arms of the Skipwiths of Metheringham

The Skipwith Baronetcy, of Metheringham in the County of Lincoln, was created in the Baronetage of England on 27 July 1678 for Thomas Skipwith, previously Member of Parliament for Grantham. The second Baronet sat as Member of Parliament for Malmesbury. The title became extinct on the death of the third Baronet in 1756.

- Sir Thomas Skipwith, 1st Baronet (c. 1620–1694)
- Sir Thomas Skipwith, 2nd Baronet (c. 1652–1710)
- Sir George Brydges Skipwith, 3rd Baronet (1686–1756)

== Sources ==
- Kidd, Charles, Williamson, David (editors). Debrett's Peerage and Baronetage (1990 edition). New York: St Martin's Press, 1990.
- Leigh Rayment's list of baronets
