= Clarksville Historic District (Clarksville, Virginia) =

Historic district in Virginia, United States

- U.S. National Register of Historic Places
- U.S. Historic district
- Virginia Landmarks Register
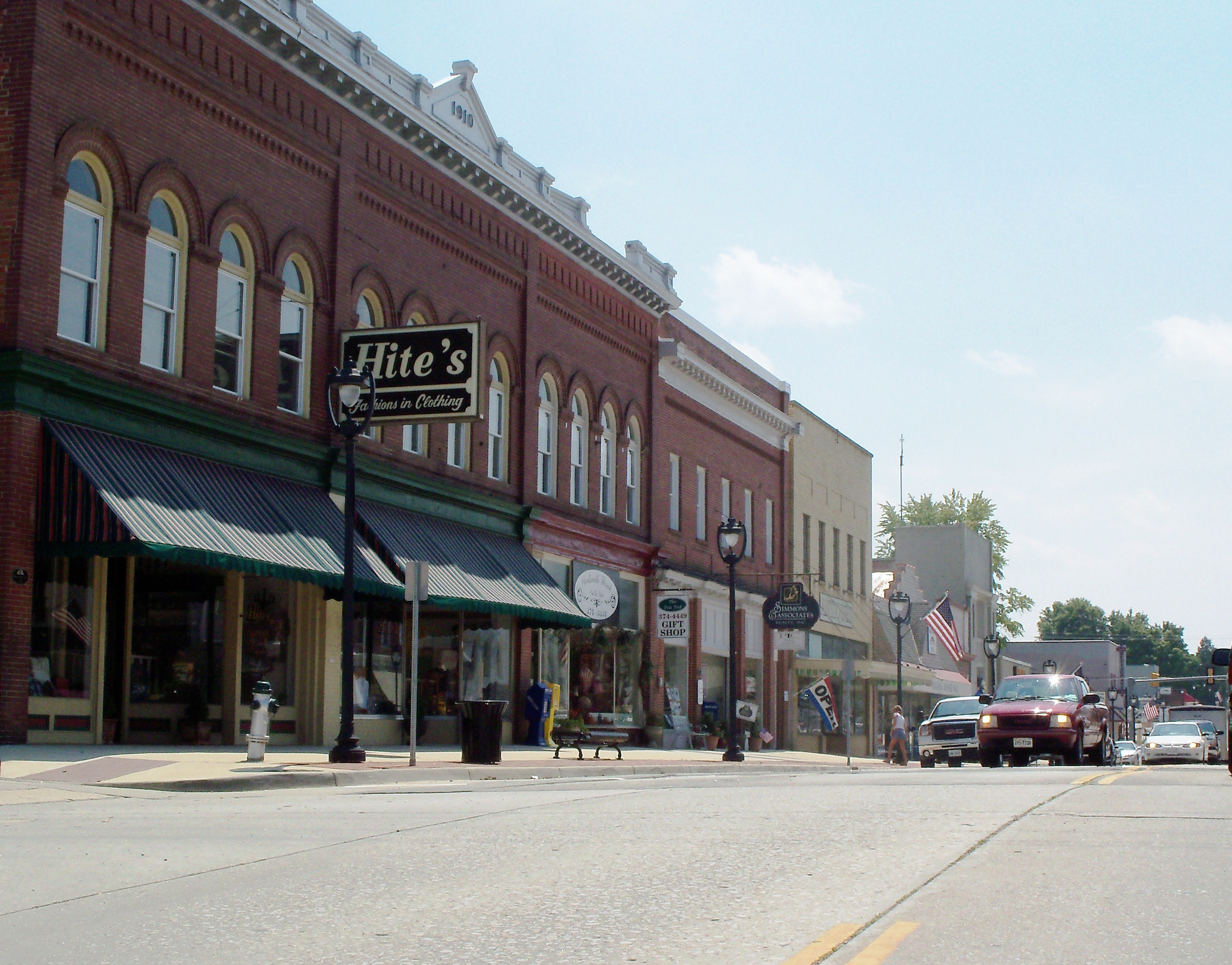
- Downtown Clarksville in 2010

- Location within Virginia Location within the United States
- Location: Roughly along Virginia Ave, from Rose Hill Ave., Ferry St., East St. and Second St., Clarksville, Virginia
- Coordinates: 36°37′21″N 78°33′29″W
- Area: 109 acres (44 ha)
- Built: 1818
- Architect: Multiple
- Architectural style: Federal, Greek Revival, et al.
- NRHP reference No.: 02000625
- VLR No.: 192-0121

Significant dates
- Added to NRHP: June 6, 2002
- Designated VLR: March 3, 2002

The Clarksville Historic District is a national historic district located at Clarksville, Mecklenburg County, Virginia. It encompasses 171 contributing buildings, 2 contributing sites, and 1 contributing structure in the central business district and surrounding residential areas of the town of Clarksille. Notable buildings include the Planters Bank (1909), Planters Brick Tobacco Sales Warehouse (c. 1840), Gilliland Hotel (c. 1900), the Russell's Furniture, former Clarksville High School (1934), Clarksville Presbyterian Church (c. 1832), Mount Zion Baptist Church (c. 1875), Jamieson Memorial Methodist Episcopal Church (1901), St. Timothy's Episcopal Church (1917), and St. Catherine of Siena Roman Catholic Church (1947). Located in the district are the separately listed Clark Royster House and the Judge Henry Wood Jr. House.

It was listed on the National Register of Historic Places in 2002.
