= Occoneechee State Park =

State park in Virginia, United States

Occoneechee State Park, Virginia, USA
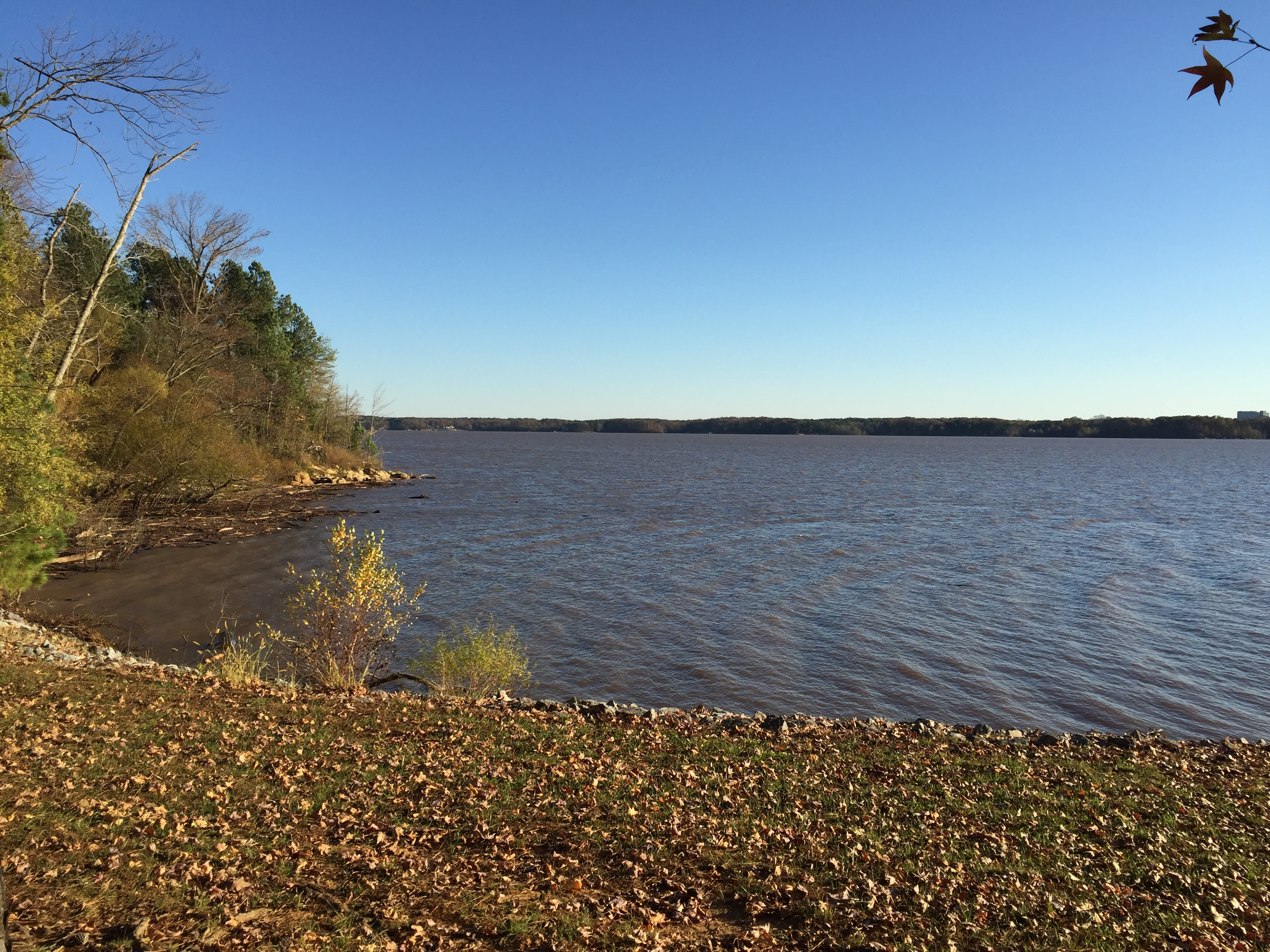
- The John H. Kerr Reservoir, better known as Buggs Island Lake, at Occoneechee State Park in Virginia

- Location within Virginia Location within the United States
- Location: Mecklenberg County, Virginia
- Nearest city: Clarksville, Virginia
- Coordinates: 36°37′33.963″N 78°31′26.7636″W
- Area: 2,698 acres (1,092 ha)
- Established: 1968
- Governing body: Virginia Department of Conservation and Recreation

Occoneechee State Park is a 2,698-acre (10.92 km^{2}) state park in Mecklenburg County near Clarksville, Virginia, located along Buggs Island Lake. Its name reflects the Occaneechi Indians, who lived on (and traded from) an island in the Roanoke River near its confluence with the Dan River, which was flooded by the creation of the Kerr Lake reservoir in 1952.

== History ==
Bacon's Rebellion abruptly ended their prominence in 1676. This armed rebellion is considered to be the first to occur in the New World. It began when Nathaniel Bacon’s plantation was raided by Susquehannock Indians, who had been displaced from their home to the north. Bacon asked Virginia Governor William Berkeley to raise a militia and retaliate. Berkley denied the request so Bacon raised a militia, in violation of the governor’s wishes.

== Facilities ==
Cabins, yurts, equestrian and primitive campsites

Hiking trails

Splash park

Marina with fueling facility

== See also ==
- List of Virginia state parks
