= Rudd Branch Ridge–Complexes Nos. 1 and 2 =

Archaeological site in Virginia, United States

- Rudd Branch Ridge–Complexes #1 and #2
- U.S. National Register of Historic Places
- Nearest city: Boydton, Virginia
- Area: 0 acres (0 ha)
- MPS: Archeological Sites within the John H. Kerr Reservoir Area
- NRHP reference No.: 03000396
- Added to NRHP: May 8, 2003

The Rudd Branch Ridge–Complexes Nos. 1 and 2 are a pair of former tobacco plantations near the John H. Kerr Reservoir in Mecklenburg County, Virginia. These plantations were operated from the 1800s into the 1940s, when they were purchased by the federal government as part of the reservoir construction. The remnants of the two complexes, which include tobacco barns and other outbuildings, may yield archaeologically significant information on the organization and operation of 19th century tobacco plantations.

The site was listed on the National Register of Historic Places in 2003.

== See also ==
- National Register of Historic Places listings in Mecklenburg County, Virginia
