= Prestwould =

Historic house in Virginia, United States

- U.S. National Register of Historic Places
- U.S. National Historic Landmark
- Virginia Landmarks Register
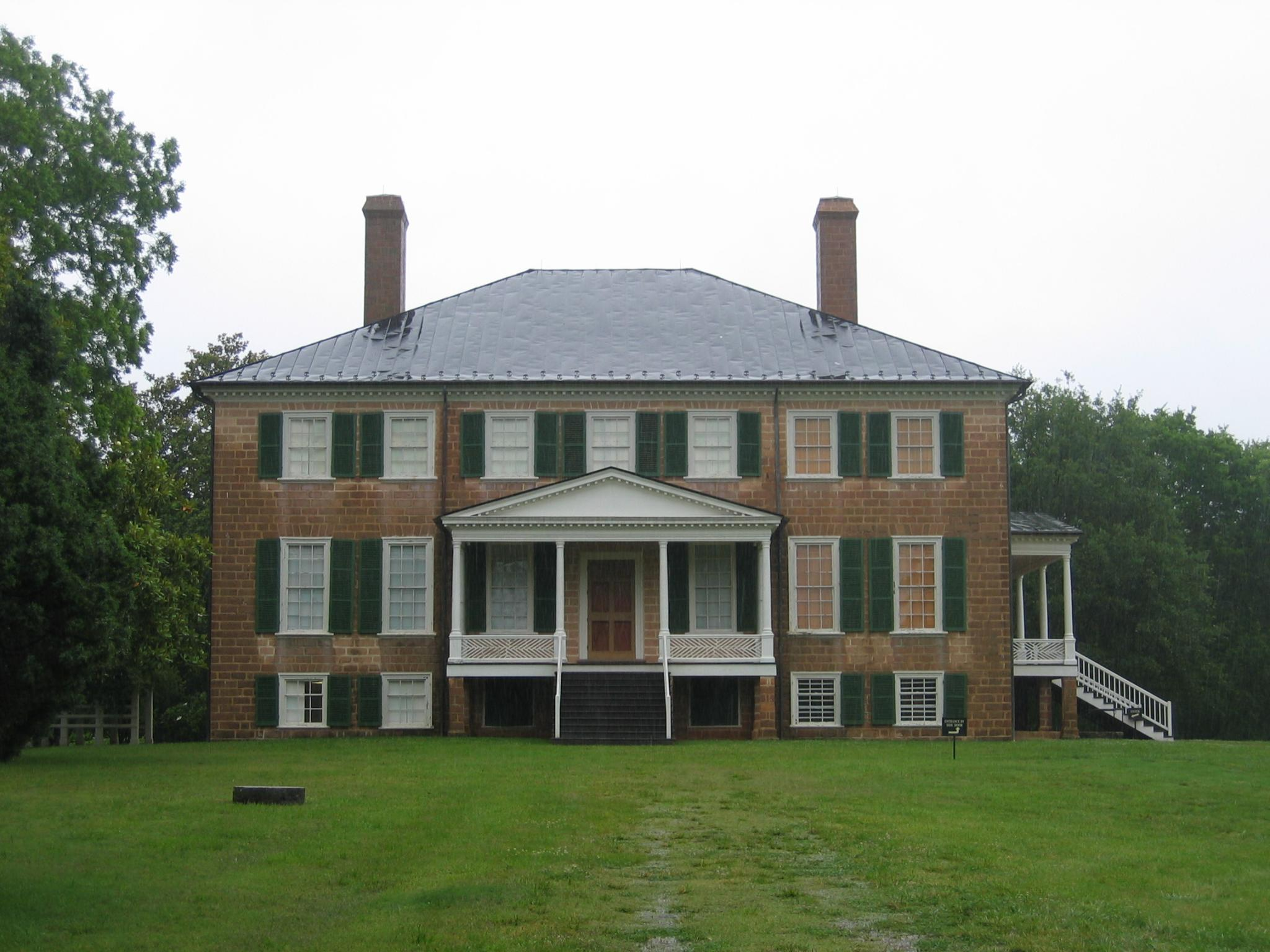
- Prestwould, June 2009

- Location within Virginia Location within the United States
- Interactive map showing the location of Prestwould
- Location: N of Clarksville, Virginia
- Coordinates: 36°38′59″N 78°33′51″W
- Area: 46 acres (19 ha)
- Built: 1795
- NRHP reference No.: 69000260
- VLR No.: 058-0045

Significant dates
- Added to NRHP: October 1, 1969
- Designated NHL: July 31, 2003
- Designated VLR: November 5, 1968

Prestwould is a historic house near Clarksville in Mecklenburg County, Virginia. The most intact and best documented plantation surviving in Southside Virginia was built for Sir Peyton Skipwith, 7th Baronet Skipwith, who moved his family from his Elm Hill Plantation to Prestwould in 1797. It has been operated by the Prestwould Foundation as a historic site since 1963, nominated to the National Register of Historic Places in 1969, and declared a National Historic Landmark in 2003. It is located on the north side of the Roanoke River, 1-mile (1.6 km) inland, approximately 6 miles (9.7 km) southwest of the intersection of Route 15 and Route 701, and approximately one mile north of Clarksville's town limits. Now a museum property, it is open for tours from April to October, or by appointment.

== Description and history ==
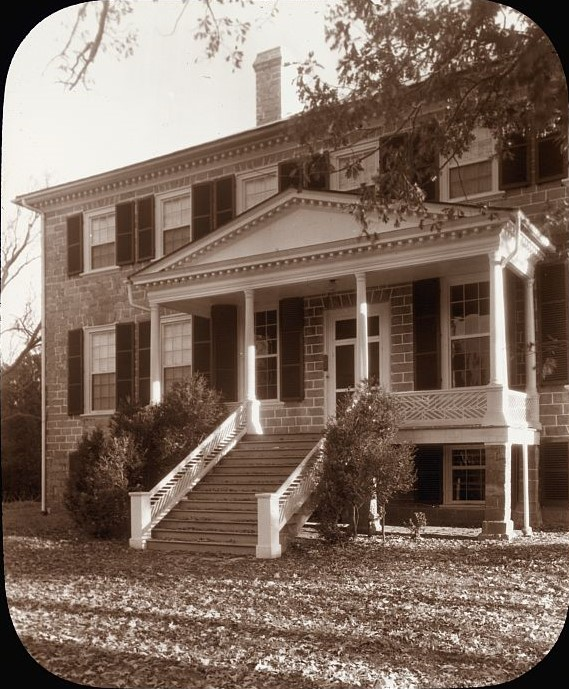
Prestwould, by Frances Benjamin Johnston, 1935. Built in 1797 for Sir Peyton Skipwith

Prestwould Plantation today consists of almost 46 acres (19 ha) on the north side of the Roanoke River. Its main house is situated on a hill overlooking the upper reaches of John H. Kerr Reservoir, created after the U.S. Army Corps of Engineers built a dam in the 1950s. The plantation complex includes eight buildings, all built before 1830 and most dating to the 1780s. The stone house features a hip roof and a pair of interior chimneys. The main symmetrical facade has seven bays: Doric columns support a gabled porch which shelters the center three bays of the first floor. Two other sides of the building have similar porches. The secondary buildings of the complex are all wood-frame structures, and include an office, plantation store, slave quarters, and a pair of smokehouses.

== See also ==
- List of National Historic Landmarks in Virginia
- National Register of Historic Places listings in Mecklenburg County, Virginia
