= Moss Tobacco Factory =

History factory in Virginia, US

- Formerly listed on the U.S. National Register of Historic Places
- Virginia Landmarks Register
- Location: Main and 7th Sts., Clarksville, Virginia
- Area: 0.5 acres (0.20 ha)
- Built: 1855
- NRHP reference No.: 79003054
- VLR No.: 192-0013

Significant dates
- Added to NRHP: May 21, 1979
- Designated VLR
- Removed from NRHP: March 19, 2001

Moss Tobacco Factory was a historic tobacco factory located at Clarksville, Mecklenburg County, Virginia. It was built about 1855, and was a 3 1/2-story, brick building with a gable roof erected in two sections. The Moss Tobacco Factory operated until 1862. It later housed an exchange or auction house for the sale of tobacco and as a tobacco warehouse. It was demolished in February 1980.

It was listed on the National Register of Historic Places in 1979, and delisted in 2001.
