= Cedar Grove (Clarksville, Virginia) =

Historic house in Virginia, United States

- U.S. National Register of Historic Places
- Virginia Landmarks Register
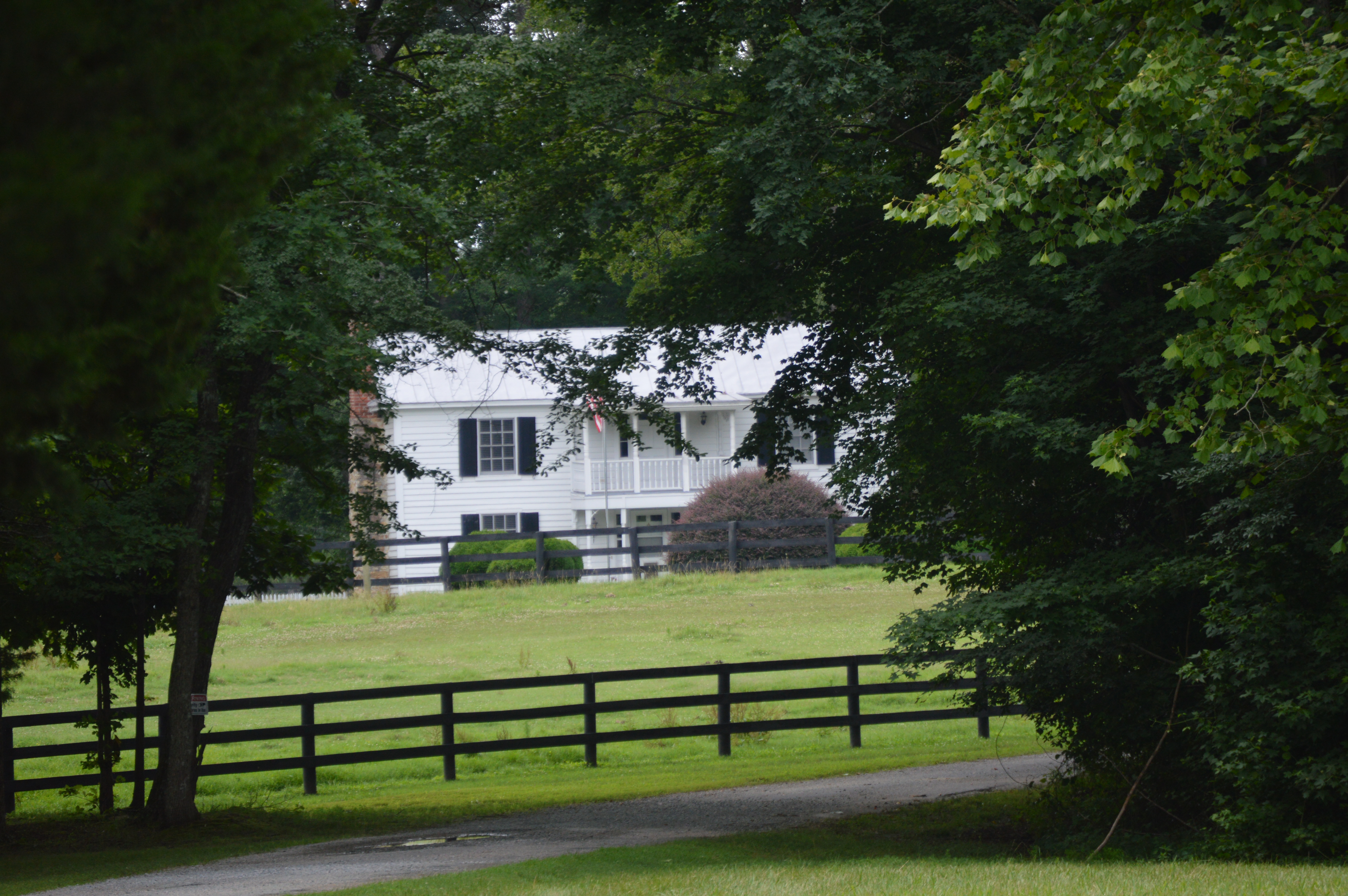
- Plantation entrance

- Location within Virginia Location within the United States
- Location: 138 Lewis Mill Rd., near Clarksville, Virginia
- Coordinates: 36°34′37″N 78°35′15″W
- Area: 100 acres (40 ha)
- Built: 1838
- NRHP reference No.: 10000560
- VLR No.: 058-0006

Significant dates
- Added to NRHP: August 16, 2010
- Designated VLR: June 17, 2010

Cedar Grove is a historic plantation house and farm located near Clarksville, Mecklenburg County, Virginia. The house was built in 1838, and is a Greek Revival style brick dwelling. It consists of a large one-story block on a raised basement with a hipped roof capped with a smaller clerestory with a hipped roof and modern flanking one-story brick wings the historic central block. The front and rear facades feature entry porches with six Doric order columns. Also on the property are the contributing ice house and smokehouse dating from 1838, and a number of other secondary structures and agricultural buildings.

It was listed on the National Register of Historic Places in 2010.
