= Willie Royster =

American baseball player

- Catcher
- Born: April 11, 1954; Clarksville, Virginia, U.S.
- Died: November 23, 2015 (aged 61); Ocean View, New Jersey, U.S.
- Batted: Right Threw: Right

MLB debut
- September 3, 1981, for the Baltimore Orioles

Last MLB appearance
- October 2, 1981, for the Baltimore Orioles

MLB statistics
- Games played: 4
- At bats: 4
- Hits: 0
- Stats at Baseball Reference

Teams
- Baltimore Orioles (1981)

Willie Arthur Royster (April 11, 1954 – November 23, 2015) was an American professional baseball player. The catcher spent eleven seasons in minor league baseball, with a brief, four-game Major League trial for the 1981 Baltimore Orioles. He threw and batted right-handed, stood 5 feet 11 inches (1.80 m) tall and weighed 180 pounds (82 kg).

Royster was chosen by the Orioles in the 22nd round of the 1972 Major League Baseball draft. He played in the minors from 1972 to 1976 and 1978–1981 — missing the entire 1977 season — until a breakout season with the 1981 Charlotte O's of the Double-A Southern League saw him hit 31 home runs and drive in 88 runs batted in, both career highs. Baltimore recalled him after the September 1 roster expansion.

In Royster's four MLB games played, he appeared as a late-inning defensive replacement and pinch hitter. In his four big-league at bats, he struck out twice and grounded out twice.

He returned to the minors in 1982, and his pro career ended after the 1983 season. He played all but 66 of his 961 minor-league games in the Orioles' organization. Willie died at his home in the Ocean View section of Dennis Township, New Jersey, on November 23, 2015, at the age of 61.
