= Patrick Robert Sydnor Log Cabin =

Historic house in Virginia, United States

- U.S. National Register of Historic Places
- Virginia Landmarks Register
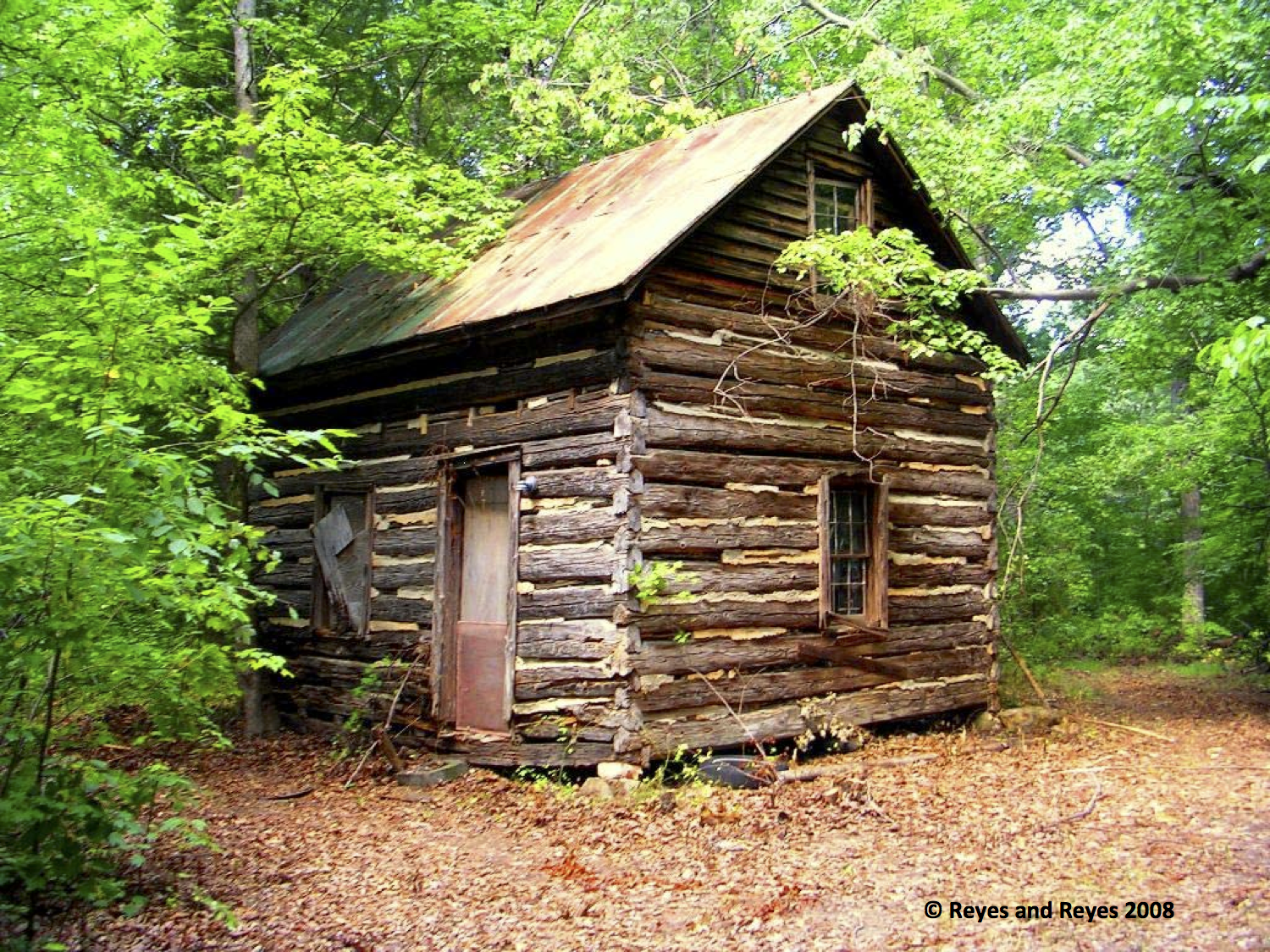
- The Patrick Robert Sydnor Log Cabin

- Location within Virginia Location within the United States
- Location: near Clarksville, Virginia
- Area: 0 acres (0 ha)
- Built: c. 1865
- NRHP reference No.: 07000896
- VLR No.: 058-5076

Significant dates
- Added to NRHP: August 30, 2007
- Designated VLR: June 6, 2007

Patrick Robert "Parker" Sydnor Log Cabin sits on a historic site located in Clarksville, Virginia. The construction of the cabin suggests that it was built during the antebellum period. A 1 1/2-story log building with a gable roof, the cabin consists of one room with a loft above, and a brick and stone chimney. Also found on the northwest side of the property is a wood storage shed, a chicken house, and an outhouse, dating from around 1930.

== Cabin description ==
The cabin sits on a low, random-rubble fieldstone foundation, although portions of the foundation have subsided. The first floor walls are constructed of V-notched logs with the chinking between the logs still mostly intact and in fair to good condition, with evidence of repair. There is a plank door entrance to the right and a 6x6 window to the left on the south side of the cabin. To the north or rear side of the cabin, there is also an entrance with a six-panel door. The east end of the cabin contains a 6x6, double-hung sash wood window centrally placed on the first floor, and a 4x4 wood sash window directly overhead in the gable. All the window and door openings are surrounded with simple wooden frames of flat boards without molded profiles that appear to be mid-twentieth-century.

The exterior west wall stone chimney is composed of cut blocks and fieldstone (mid-twentieth-century mortar repair) with a brick chimney-stack in American bond. The stack rises from stone shoulders that begin where the log portion of the wall meets the clapboard section at the base of the gable.

Within the first-floor room of the cabin, there is a fireplace at the west end. The fireplace has a solid brick mantel and a small brick firebox. At the opposite end of the room, immediately adjacent to the primary, south entrance, there is a dog-leg stair with two steps rising to shallow landing toward the loft. The stair indicates mild repairs but is primarily in its original condition.

The first floor interior walls of the cabin show signs of modernization, possibly in the 1960s, but the loft walls are still unfinished. The cabin flooring has also been replaced, dating early to mid-twentieth center. The roof rafters are exposed with broad planks and a metal roof sitting atop. In the gable ends the studs and interior sides of the weatherboard cladding are exposed.

=== Historical significance ===
Associated with slavery, the American Civil War, and Reconstruction in Mecklenburg County, Virginia, the Sydnor log cabin was a significant "home place" for several generations of African Americans from Reconstruction to the mid-twentieth century.

The property was first sold to Lovice "Vicey" Skipwith (1856–1936), a former slave of Prestwould Plantation, from the holdings of the Skipwith family and Prestwould Plantation, in 1888. A purchase of this sort is representative of the histories of African-American families in Mecklenburg County and other parts of Virginia, who established themselves as farmers, after the Civil War, often on the very plantations or land adjacent to the plantations where they were once enslaved. The log cabin that Vicey Skipwith purchased would eventually become a home place to several African-American families in Mecklenburg County's Bluestone District. One such African-American family was that of Patrick Robert "Parker" Sydnor.

==== Patrick Robert "Parker" Sydnor ====
Parker Sydnor was a stone carver who lived in the area of Cabin Point, Virginia, residing in the log cabin during the 1930s and 1940s.

He worked for more than 40 years at his craft, and many African Americans came to him to have gravestones made for their deceased loved ones. Significantly, Sydnor was both literate and an expert stone carver. He was also associated with many African-American families living in the vicinity of Cabin Point during the twentieth and twenty-first century, as well as the African-American churches and funeral parlors in the surrounding area.

Although Parker Sydnor and Vicey Skipwith were acquaintances from Bluestone District, they were not biologically related. These two were known to each other as "fictive kin," a term which refers to individuals who are unrelated by either birth or marriage, but who have an extended significant relationship to one another, which takes on the characteristics of a family-oriented relationship.

==== Background ====
The restored antebellum plantation of Sir Peyton Skipwith (1740–1805) and Lady Jean Skipwith (1748–1826) in Mecklenburg County, Virginia is well known for both its historical and architectural significance established by its listing as a National Historic Landmark in 2007. A National Historic Landmark (NHL) is a building, site, structure, or object that is officially recognized by the United States government for its national-level historical significance. A historic map of Prestwould plantation documents that the Sydnor log cabin property, about a mile from the manor house of Prestwould, was once a part of the original Prestwould estate. Prestwould's legacy began in 1708 with the completion of the Prestwould manor and the expansion of Sir Peyton Skipwith's land holdings that demonstrated his power and wealth in Mecklenburg County. Upon Sir Peyton Skipwith's death, the Prestwould estate was transferred to his oldest son, Humberston Skipwith (1791-1863). After the death of Humbertson, Fulwar Skipwith (1836-1900), inherited much of the Prestwould holdings, including Prestwould plantation in 1863. During Reconstruction, however, Fulwar Skipwith sold most of the land associated with the original estate due to financial ruin.

It was during this time of liquidation of Fulwar Skipwith's property that many African-American families in Mecklenburg County became landowners as tracts and small parcels of plantation farmland were sold to both male and female, black and white individuals with the financial means to purchase property.

According to the 1870 U.S. Census, Vicey Skipwith along with six members of her family were tenants at the property site. The log cabin has sheltered many African-American families since that early beginning of African-American property ownership.

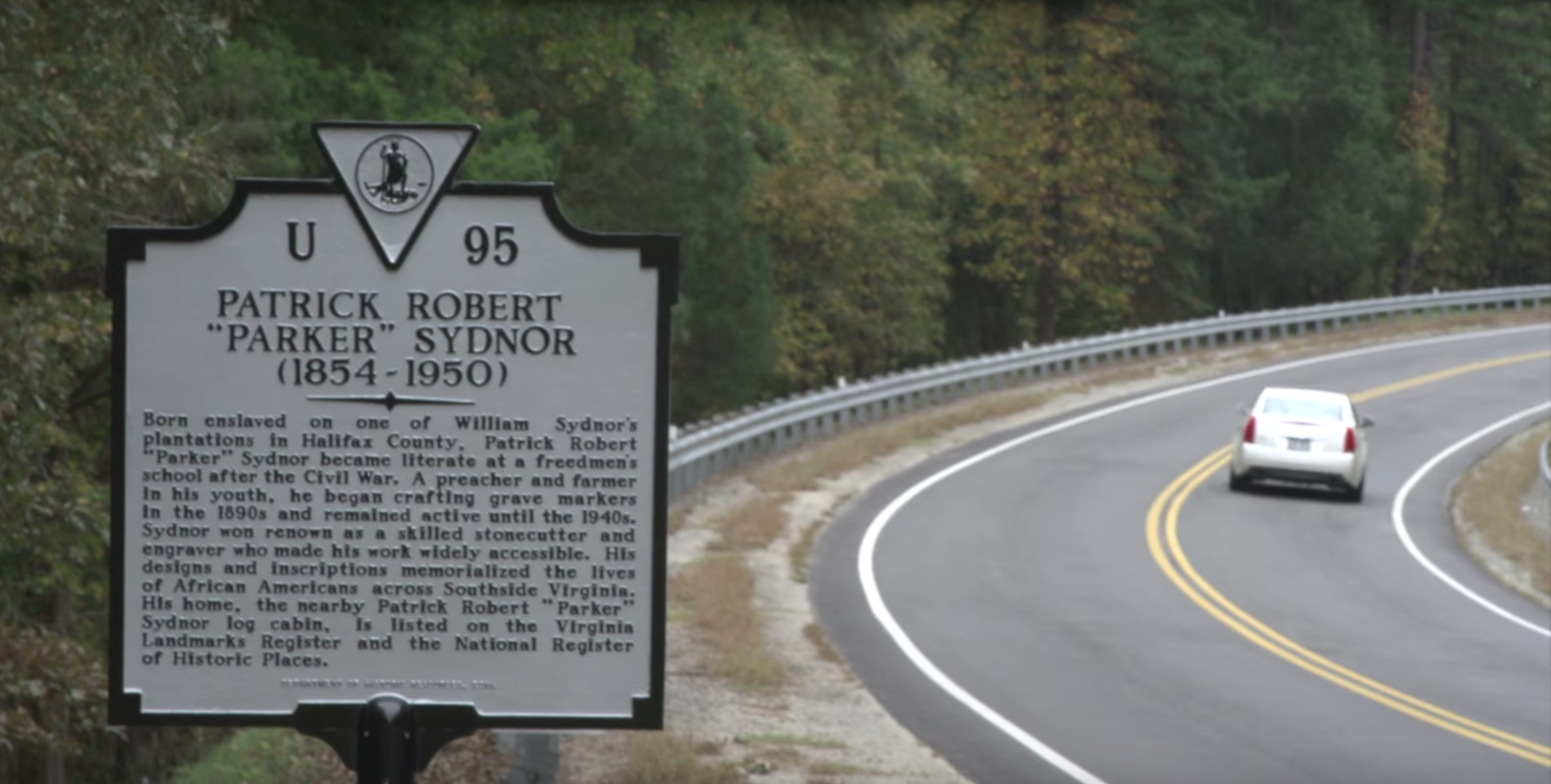
Parker Sydnor Highway Maker
