= Buffalo Junction, Virginia =

Unincorporated community in Virginia, United States

- Unincorporated community
- Location within Virginia Location within the United States
- Coordinates: 36°36′16″N 78°37′54″W
- Country: United States
- State: Virginia
- County: Mecklenburg
- Elevation: 423 ft (129 m)
- Time zone: UTC-5 (Eastern (EST))
  - Summer (DST): UTC-4 (EDT)
- ZIP code: 24529
- Area code: 434
- GNIS feature ID: 1496822

Buffalo Junction is an unincorporated community in Mecklenburg County, Virginia, United States. Buffalo Junction is located on Virginia State Route 49, 4.4 miles (7.1 km) west-southwest of Clarksville. Buffalo Junction has a post office with ZIP code 24529.

The name of the location is derived from its history as a railroad junction. The Atlantic and Danville Railway used to pass through the community and a wye was located there that connected the mainline to Buffalo Springs, 3.89 miles away, via the Buffalo Springs Branch. The branch opened prior to 1890 and was closed by 1940.
