= Fairview, Mecklenburg County, Virginia =

Fairview
- CDP
- Location within the Commonwealth of Virginia
- Coordinates: 36°49′45″N 78°27′55″W
- Country: United States
- State: Virginia
- County: Mecklenburg
- Time zone: UTC−5 (Eastern (EST))
  - Summer (DST): UTC−4 (EDT)
- ZIP codes: 23924
- FIPS code: 51-26944
- GNIS feature ID: 2584846

Fairview is a census-designated place in Mecklenburg County, Virginia, United States, just north of Chase City. Some of the community is considered North Chase City. The population as of the 2010 census was 240.

== Demographics ==
Historical population
Census	Pop.	Note	%±
U.S. Decennial Census; 2010 2020

Fairview was first listed as a census designated place in the 2010 U.S. census.
