= Elm Hill Archaeological Site =

Archaeological site in Virginia, United States

- U.S. National Register of Historic Places
- Virginia Landmarks Register
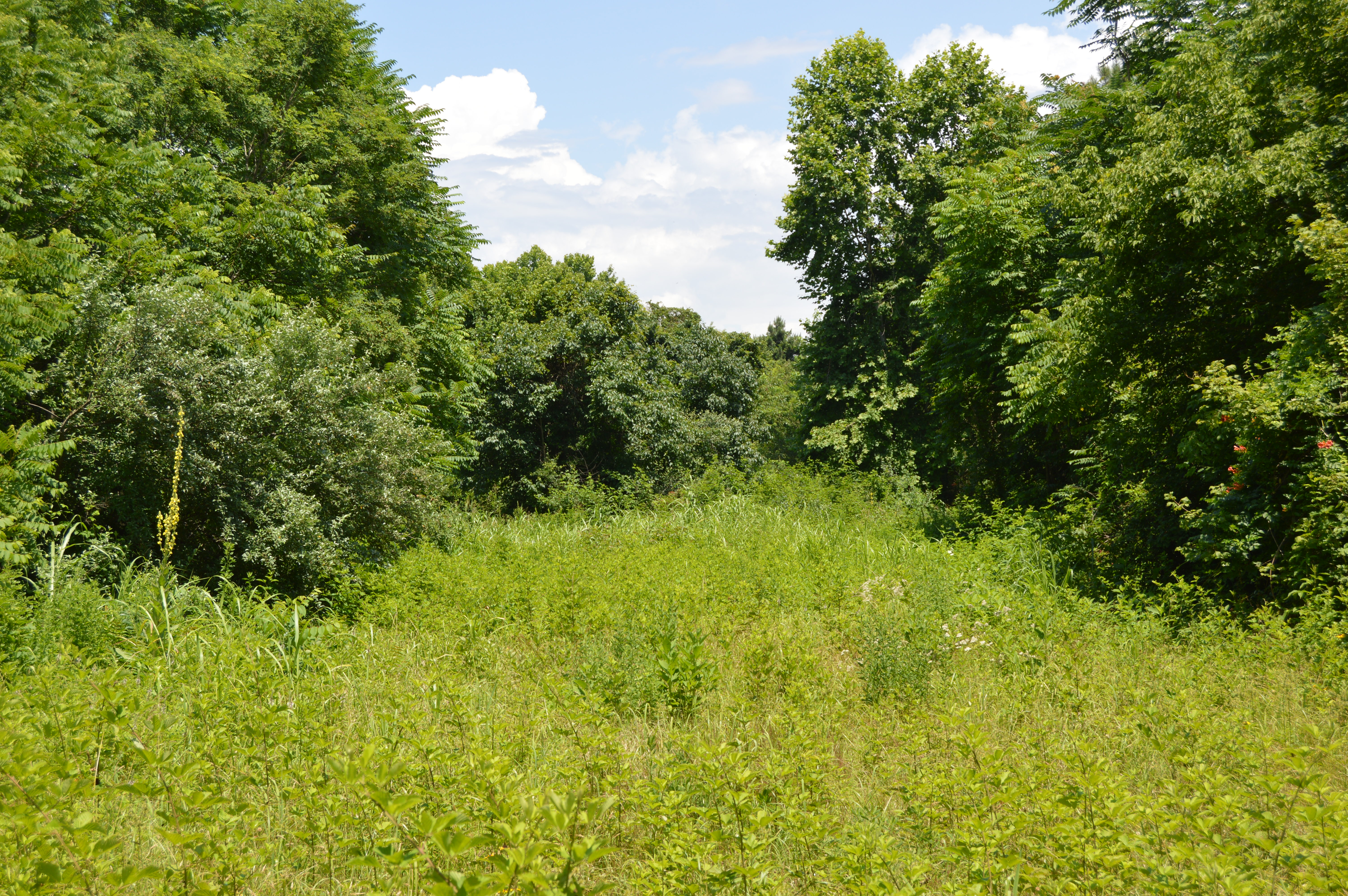
- Meadow at the site

- Location within Virginia Location within the United States
- Location: near Castle Heights, Virginia
- Coordinates: 36°36′41″N 78°16′9″W
- Area: 12 acres (4.9 ha)
- NRHP reference No.: 85000569
- VLR No.: 058-0084

Significant dates
- Added to NRHP: March 14, 1985
- Designated VLR: December 3, 1997

Elm Hill Archaeological Site is a historic archaeological site located on the north bank of the Roanoke River near Castle Heights, Mecklenburg County, Virginia. It is a large, Late Woodland period palisaded village site with evidence of occupation reaching back to the Late Archaic Period. The district is included within the Tobacco Heritage Trail.

It was listed on the National Register of Historic Places in 1985.
