= Eureka (Baskerville, Virginia) =

Historic house in Virginia, United States

- U.S. National Register of Historic Places
- Virginia Landmarks Register
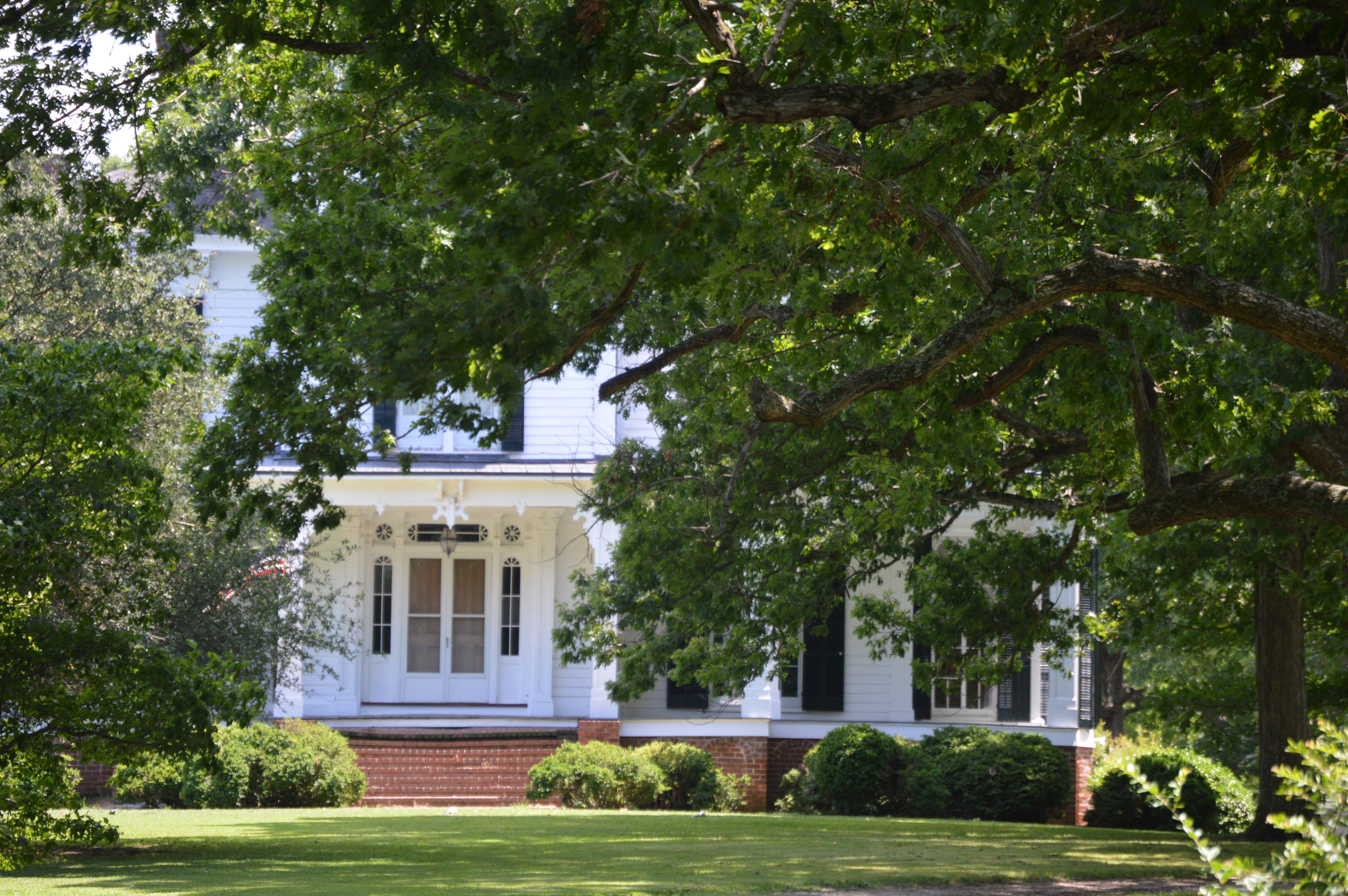
- Facade

- Location within Virginia Location within the United States
- Location: SE of Baskerville, near Baskerville, Virginia
- Coordinates: 36°37′58″N 78°14′8″W
- Area: 9 acres (3.6 ha)
- Built: 1854-1859
- Architect: Jacob W. Holt
- Architectural style: Italian Villa
- NRHP reference No.: 80004200
- VLR No.: 058-0010

Significant dates
- Added to NRHP: September 17, 1980
- Designated VLR: July 19, 1977

Eureka is a historic home located near Baskerville, Mecklenburg County, Virginia. It was designed by Jacob W. Holt and built between 1854 and 1859. The house is two stories tall and three bays wide with a central, three-story tower, embellished with a third story balcony, on the facade. The house is representative of the Italian Villa style. It features a one-story, porch and the interior features interior graining and marbleizing and custom-made furniture. Also on the property is a contributing log corn crib.

It was listed on the National Register of Historic Places in 1980.
