= Sunnyside (Clarksville, Virginia) =

Historic house in Virginia, United States

- Sunnyside (2018)
- U.S. National Register of Historic Places
- Virginia Landmarks Register
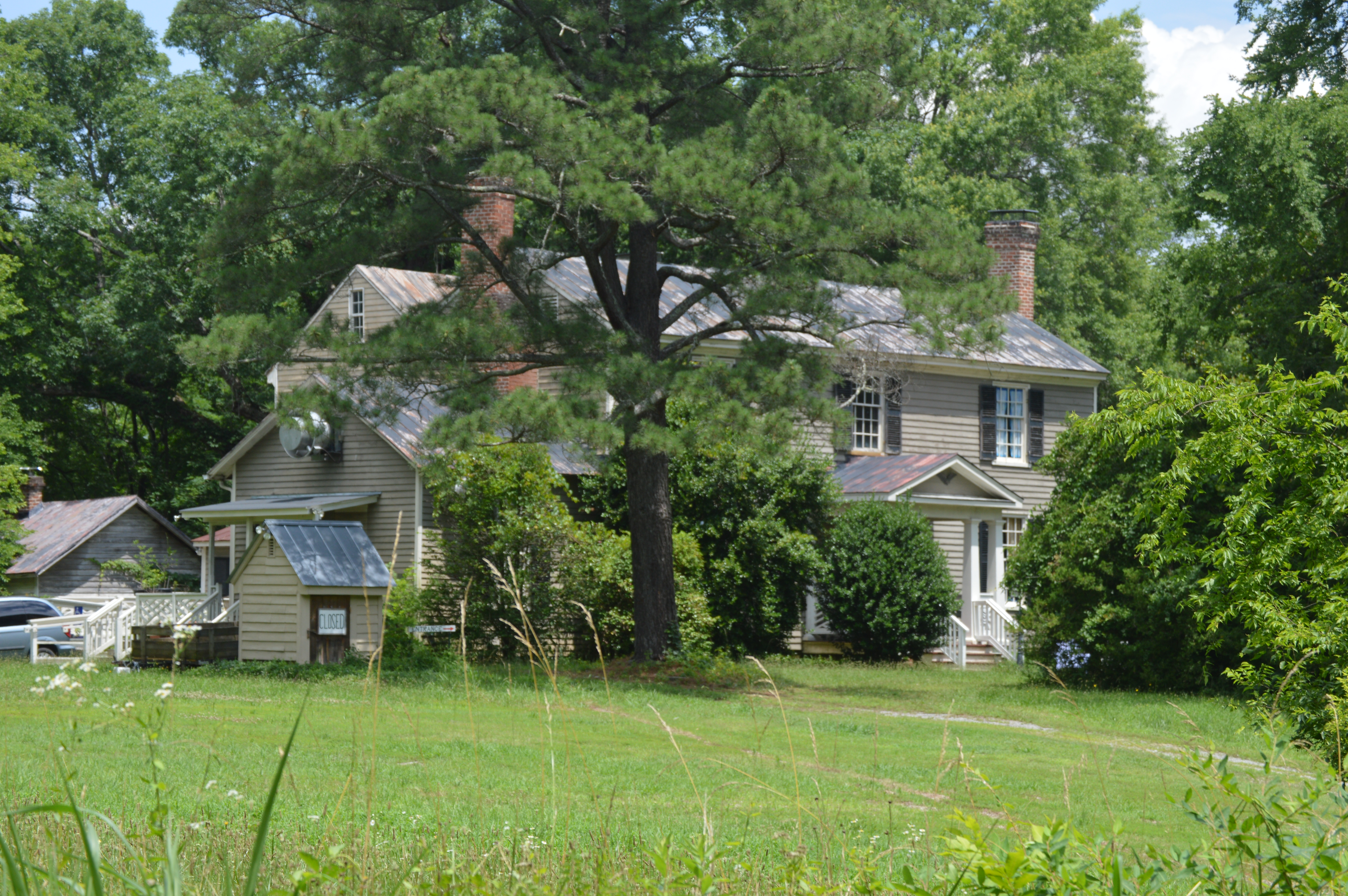
- Facade and western end

- Location within Virginia Location within the United States
- Location: 104 Shiney Rock Rd., Clarksville, Virginia
- Coordinates: 36°36′47″N 78°34′16″W
- Area: 25 acres (10 ha)
- Built: 1833-1837
- Architectural style: I-house
- NRHP reference No.: 96001452
- VLR No.: 192-0002

Significant dates
- Added to NRHP: December 6, 1996
- Designated VLR: June 19, 1996

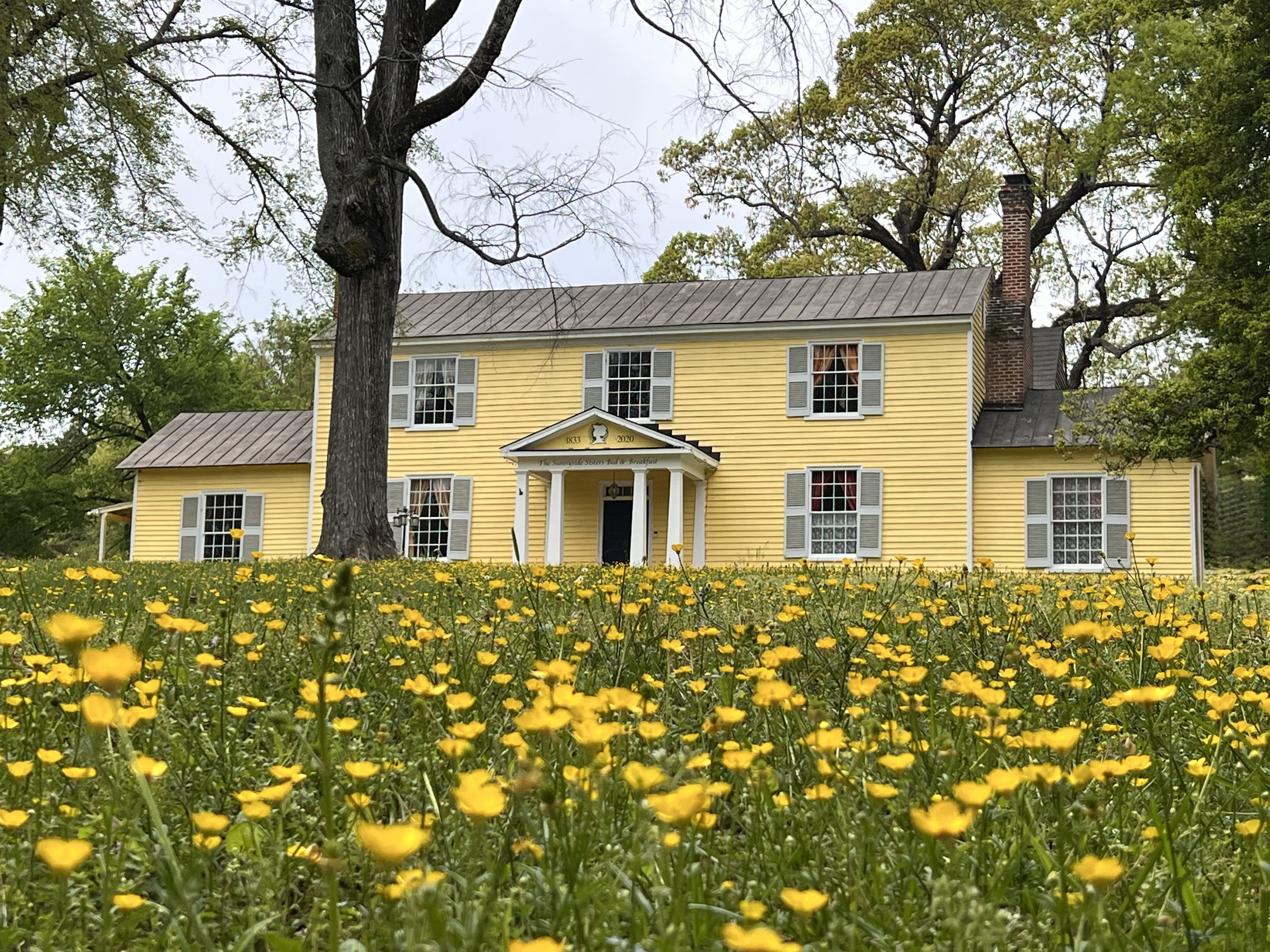
Sunnyside Sisters B&B (fully renovated 2026)

Sunnyside is a historic plantation house located at Clarksville, Mecklenburg County, Virginia. The house was built in three sections: a one-room, two-story, three-bay frame dwelling with a side passage, built in 1833; a two-story, three bay I-house, begun in 1836 in front of the first dwelling and connected to it by a one-story hyphen; and a two-story, one room, one-bay addition built in 1837. Also on the property are the contributing late-19th century kitchen, an early-to-mid-19th century servant's quarter, an early-to-mid-19th century smokehouse, a mid-19th century shed, an early-20th century chicken house, the site of a 19th-century ice pit, a 19th and early 20th century tenant house / tobacco processing barn, three late 19th or early-20th century log tobacco barns, a 19th-century log tenant house, and the Carrington / Johnson family cemetery.

It was listed on the National Register of Historic Places in 1996.

In 2020 Sunnyside was bought by Martijn and Eveline Broeders, a couple from the Netherlands. They completely restored the home and turned into a 5 bed- and 5 bathroom Bed and Breakfast: The Sunnyside Sisters.
