= Elm Hill (Wheeling, West Virginia) =

Historic house in West Virginia, United States

- U.S. National Register of Historic Places
- U.S. Historic district
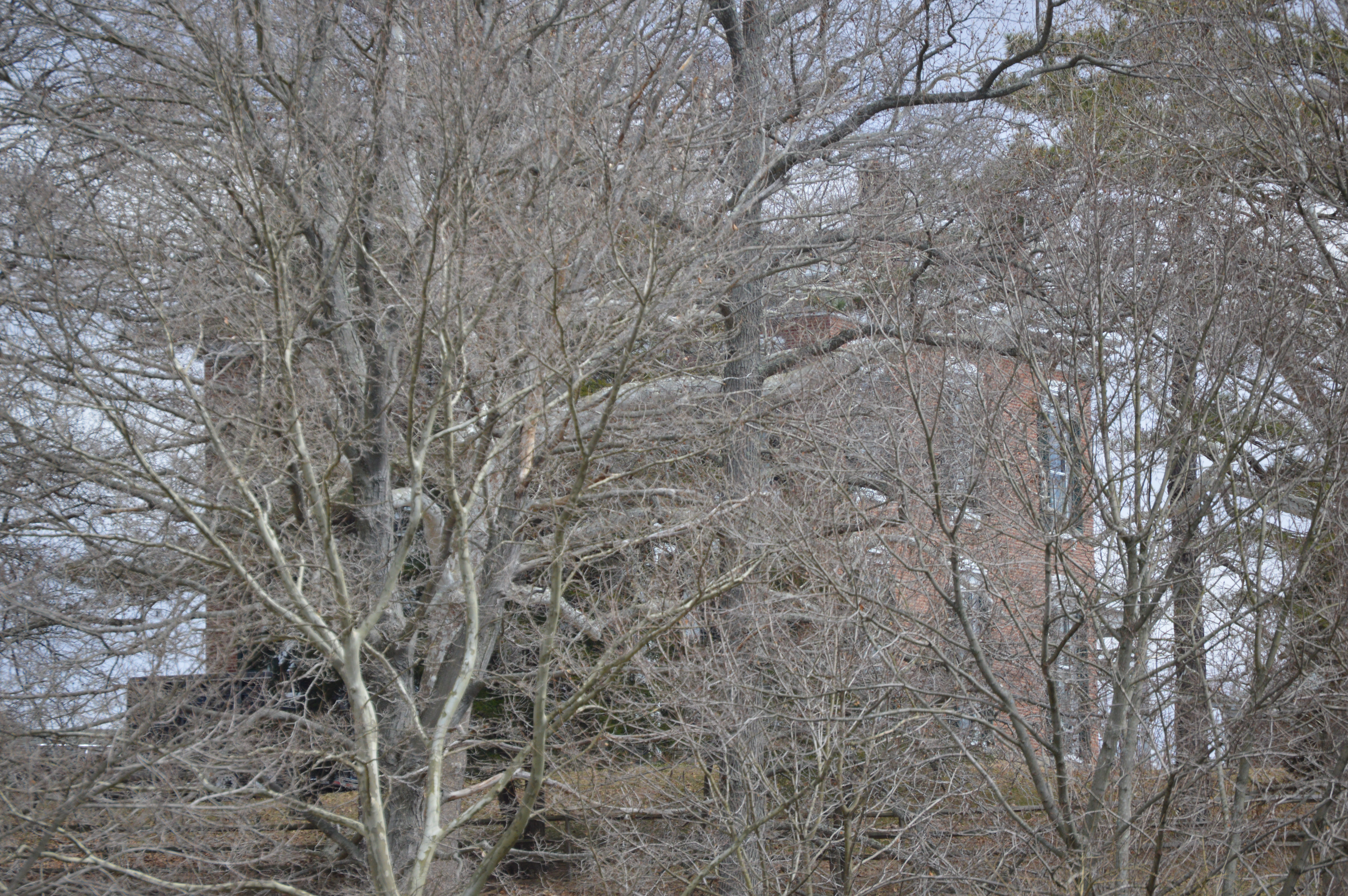
- Dimly visible through a copse of trees

- Location within West Virginia Location within the United States
- Location: WV 88 NE of Wheeling Country Club, near Wheeling, West Virginia
- Coordinates: 40°5′41″N 80°40′41″W
- Area: 19.3 acres (7.8 ha)
- Built: 1850
- Architectural style: Greek Revival
- NRHP reference No.: 91001732
- Added to NRHP: December 4, 1991

Elm Hill, also known as the Campbell-Bloch House, is a historic house and national historic district located near Wheeling, Ohio County, West Virginia. The district includes two contributing buildings and one contributing site. The main house was built about 1850, and is a 2 1/2-story, brick house with a low 2-story wing in the Greek Revival style. It has an L-shaped plan, a 3-bay entrance portico, and hipped roof with an octagonal bell-cast central cupola. The interior has a central formal hall plan. Also on the property are a contributing brick, spring house / smoke house and a small cemetery dating to about 1835.

It was listed on the National Register of Historic Places in 1991.
