= Clark Royster House =

Historic house in Virginia, United States

- U.S. National Register of Historic Places
- Virginia Landmarks Register
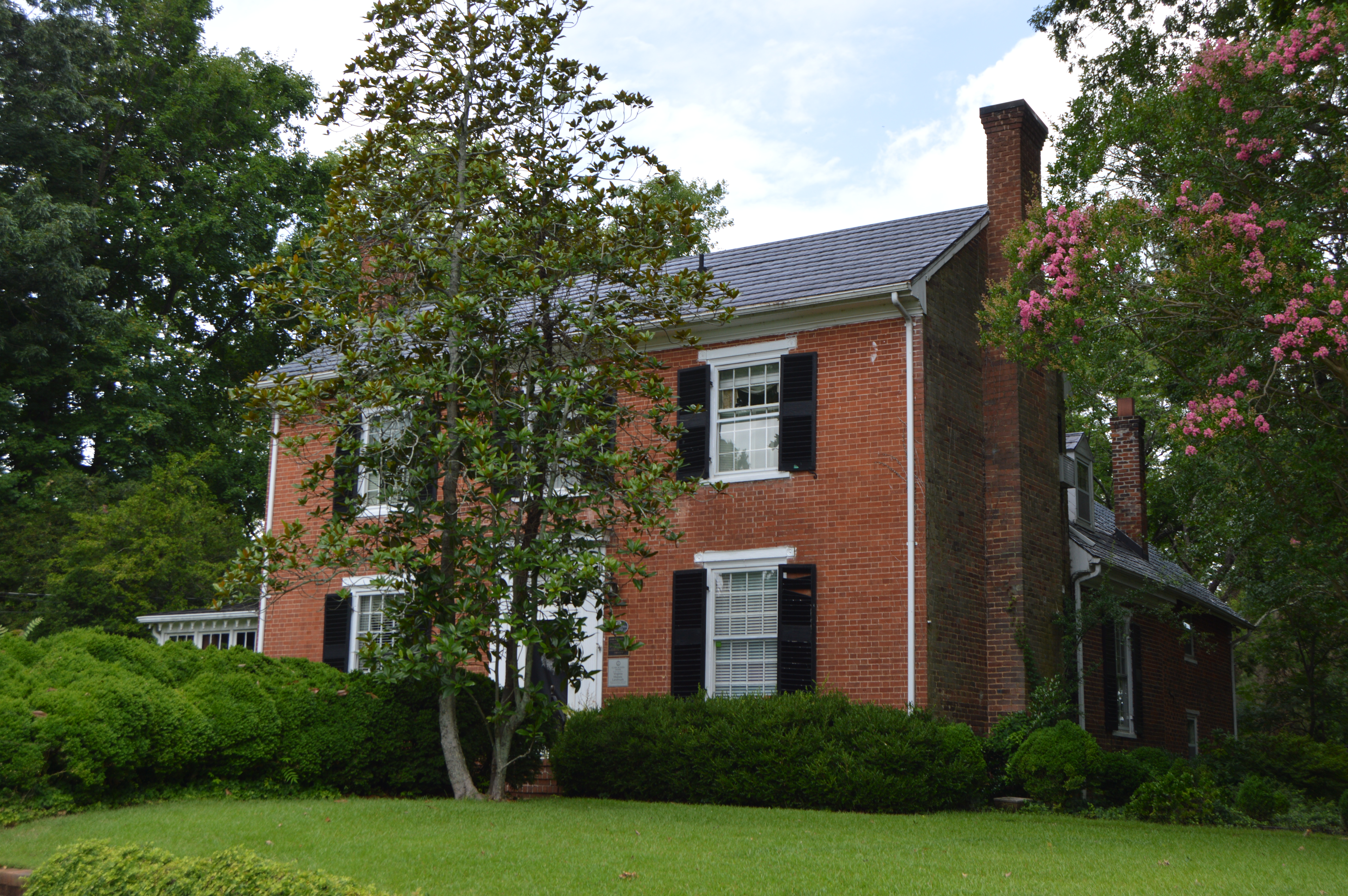
- Front and eastern side

- Location within Virginia Location within the United States
- Location: 300 Rose Hill Ave., Clarksville, Virginia
- Coordinates: 36°37′38″N 78°33′29″W
- Area: 1 acre (0.40 ha)
- Architectural style: Federal
- NRHP reference No.: 96001455
- VLR No.: 192-0071

Significant dates
- Added to NRHP: December 16, 1996
- Designated VLR: June 19, 1996

The Clark Royster House is a historic home located at Clarksville, Mecklenburg County, Virginia. It was built about 1840, and is a two-story, single-pile Federal-style brick dwelling. Also on the property are the contributing site of a combined kitchen and slave quarters and an original 65-foot-deep rock well. It was the former home of Clark Royster, founder of the town of Clarksville.

It was listed on the National Register of Historic Places in 1996.
