= Union Level, Virginia =

Union Level
- CDP
- Location within the Commonwealth of Virginia
- Coordinates: 36°42′26″N 78°13′55″W
- Country: United States
- State: Virginia
- County: Mecklenburg

Population (2010)
  - Total: 188
- Time zone: UTC−5 (Eastern (EST))
  - Summer (DST): UTC−4 (EDT)
- ZIP codes: 23970
- FIPS code: 51-80016
- GNIS feature ID: 2584931

Union Level is a census-designated place in Mecklenburg County, Virginia, United States. As of the 2020 census, Union Level had a population of 161.

== Demographics ==
Historical population
| Census | Pop. | Note | %± |
|---|---|---|---|
| 2010 | 188 | | — |
| 2020 | 161 | | −14.4% |
U.S. Decennial Census; 2010 2020

Union Level was first listed as a census designated place in the 2010 U.S. census.
