= Judge Henry Wood Jr. House =

Historic house in Virginia, United States

- Judge Henry Wood, Jr., House
- U.S. National Register of Historic Places
- Virginia Landmarks Register
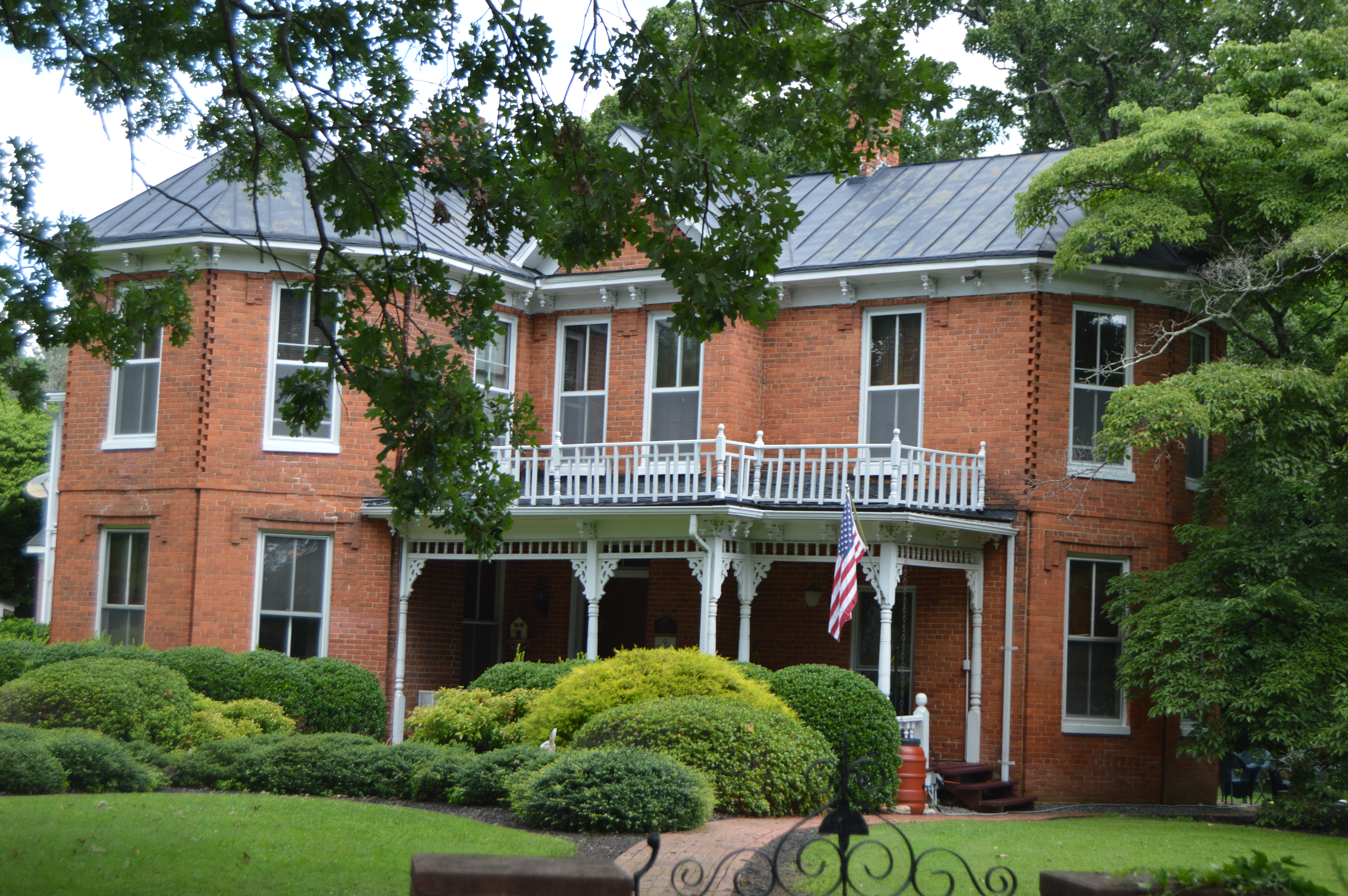
- Facade

- Location within Virginia Location within the United States
- Location: 105 Sixth St., Clarksville, Virginia
- Coordinates: 36°37′29″N 78°33′35″W
- Area: less than one acre
- Built: c. 1830
- Architectural style: Queen Anne
- NRHP reference No.: 99001201
- VLR No.: 192-0060

Significant dates
- Added to NRHP: September 24, 1999
- Designated VLR: June 19, 1999

The Judge Henry Wood Jr. House is a historic home located at Clarksville, Mecklenburg County, Virginia. It is a two-story, Queen Anne-style brick dwelling built in three sections. The original section was built between about 1820 and 1840, and forms the center section. The north wing was added after 1872, and the south wing, with an octagonal end, in the 1880s. Confederate General William Mahone (1826-1895), owned the property from 1862 to 1868.

It was listed on the National Register of Historic Places in 1999.
