= Baskerville, Virginia =

Baskerville
- CDP
- Location within the Commonwealth of Virginia
- Coordinates: 36°41′6″N 78°16′22″W
- Country: United States
- State: Virginia
- County: Mecklenburg
- Time zone: UTC−5 (Eastern (EST))
  - Summer (DST): UTC−4 (EDT)
- ZIP codes: 23915
- FIPS code: 51-04856
- GNIS feature ID: 2584802

Baskerville is a census-designated place in Mecklenburg County, Virginia, United States. The population as of the 2010 Census was 128. The state's Baskerville Correctional Center is nearby, but not within the CDP. In 2024, Baskerville was recorded to having a population of 223, an increase from the previous census in 2010. The median age was 20.6 years.

Elm Hill and Eureka are listed on the National Register of Historic Places.

== Demographics ==
Historical population
Census	Pop.	Note	%±
2020	120		—
U.S. Decennial Census; 2010 2020

Baskerville was first listed as a census designated place in the 2010 U.S. census.
