= Clarksville, Virginia =

- Town
- Town of Clarksville
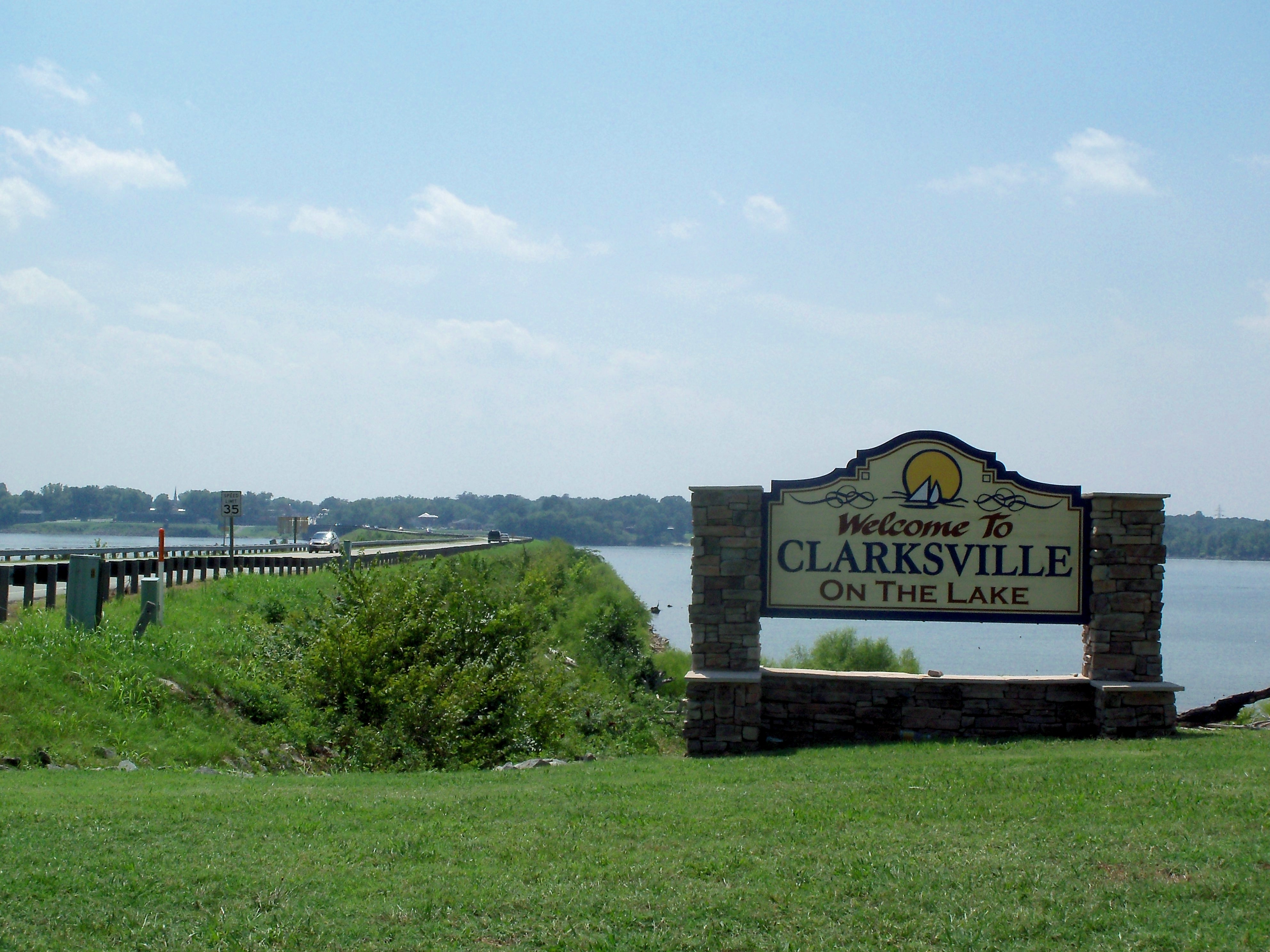
- Clarksville welcome sign

- Flag Town logo
- Motto: Virginia's Only Lakeside Town
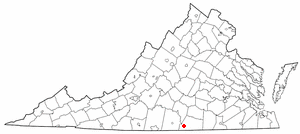
- Location of Clarksville in Mecklenburg County, Virginia

- Location in the United States
- Coordinates: 36°37′20″N 78°33′44″W
- Country: United States
- State: Virginia
- Counties: Mecklenburg
- Incorporated: February 20, 1821 (205 years ago)
- Named after: Clark Royster

Area
  - Total: 2.95 sq mi (7.64 km^{2})
  - Land: 2.91 sq mi (7.54 km^{2})
  - Water: 0.039 sq mi (0.10 km^{2})
- Elevation: 361 ft (110 m)

Population (2020)
  - Total: 1,300
  - Estimate (2022): 1,629
  - Density: 400.6/sq mi (154.67/km^{2})
- Time zone: UTC-5 (Eastern (EST))
  - Summer (DST): UTC-4 (EDT)
- ZIP code: 23927
- Area code: 434
- FIPS code: 51-16992
- GNIS feature ID: 1492773
- Website: Official website

Clarksville is a town in Mecklenburg county in the U.S. state of Virginia, near the southern border of the commonwealth. As of the 2020 census, Clarksville had a population of 1,300. Since the town has numerous buildings of the 18th-, 19th-, and early 20th-century architecture, the downtown area of Clarksville has been designated a Historic District on the National Register of Historic Places and Virginia's Historic Register. Clarksville claims the title of Virginia's only lakeside town. Nearby the town of Clarksville is Occoneechee State Park.

The town is located on Kerr Lake, which is also known as Buggs Island Lake. The 50,000-acre (202 km^{2}) lake is popular for boating and fishing; especially for catfish and many varieties of freshwater bass including largemouth bass, striped bass and crappie.

The Virginia Lake Festival is held annually at Clarksville during the third weekend of July. The town often attracts approximately 80,000 visitors during this three-day event, formerly and colloquially known as "Lakefest". It culminates with a fireworks show on the lake.

The festival has been named among the "Top Twenty Festivals In The Southeast" by the Southeast Tourism Society for many years.

== Geography ==
Clarksville is located at 36°37′20″N 78°33′44″W (36.622171, -78.562230).

According to the United States Census Bureau, the town has a total area of 2.0 square miles (5.2 km^{2}), of which 2.0 square miles (5.2 km^{2}) is land and 0.04 square miles (0.10 km^{2}) (1.49%) is water.

Clarksville is located roughly 60 miles north of Raleigh, North Carolina and roughly 90 miles southwest of Richmond.

== History ==
Located along the Roanoke River, these lands were for centuries the home to the Occaneechi Native Americans. They controlled the junction of several trading paths in the area. The Eno-Occoneechee tribe are directly descendants of the original Occoneechees and currently reside in nearby Vance County, North Carolina.

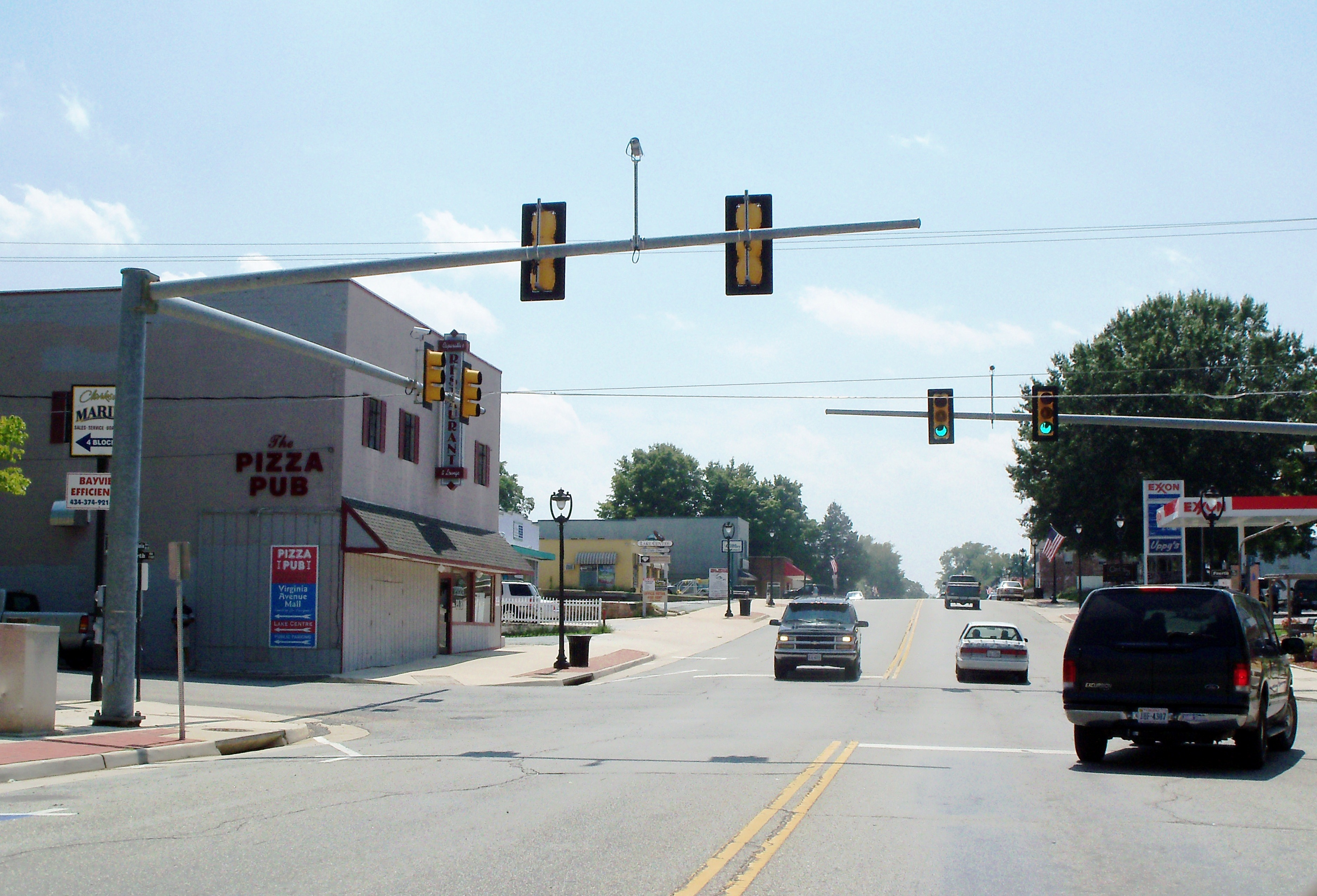
Street scene in Clarksville

Clarksville was the first incorporated town in the county of Mecklenburg. In 1818, the town was named after its founder, Clark Royster. Settlers populated the area quickly because of the temperate climate and the fine tobacco soil.

By 1832, Clarksville was recognized as one of the fastest-growing towns in Virginia. The Clarksville Tobacco Market was so large and important that the Roanoke Navigation Company was formed to transport the crop by way of the Roanoke River to Petersburg, a major export town, and other areas. A plank road was built from Clarksville to Petersburg (distance of 80 miles (130 km) for overland transport. In years to follow, the Roanoke Valley Railroad was built from Clarksville to Manson, North Carolina.

By 1848, Clarksville was known as a major market for leaf tobacco and a tobacco-manufacturing center. Large shipments of tobacco were exported to Europe. In 1860, R. H. Moss and Brothers Factory in Clarksville was producing more manufactured tobacco than any other establishment in Virginia or the Carolinas. To date, Clarksville proudly claims the title of the oldest continuous tobacco market in the world.

The Clarksville Historic District, Cedar Grove, Prestwould, Clark Royster House, Sunnyside, Patrick Robert Sydnor Log Cabin, and Judge Henry Wood, Jr. House are listed on the National Register of Historic Places.

== Demographics ==
Historical population
Census	Pop.	Note	%±
1880	582		—
1890	656		12.7%
1900	723		10.2%
1910	794		9.8%
1920	726		−8.6%
1930	781		7.6%
1940	826		5.8%
1950	1,035		25.3%
1960	1,530		47.8%
1970	1,641		7.3%
1980	1,468		−10.5%
1990	1,243		−15.3%
2000	1,329		6.9%
2010	1,139		−14.3%
2020	1,300		14.1%
2022 (est.)	1,629	▲	25.3%
U.S. Decennial Census

As of the census of 2010, there were 1,139 people, 641 households, and 380 families residing in the town. The population density was 671.5 inhabitants per square mile (259.3/km^{2}). There were 753 housing units at an average density of 380.5 units per square mile (146.9 units/km^{2}). The racial makeup of the town was 71.18% White, 26.79% African American, 0.38% Native American, 0.38% Asian, 0.08% from other races, and 1.20% from two or more races. Hispanic or Latino of any race were 0.53% of the population.

There were 641 households, out of which 21.8% had children under the age of 18 living with them, 45.1% were married couples living together, 11.2% had a female householder with no husband present, and 40.7% were non-families. 37.6% of all households were made up of individuals, and 20.4% had someone living alone who was 65 years of age or older. The average household size was 2.07 and the average family size was 2.71.

In the town, the population was spread out, with 20.2% under the age of 18, 5.6% from 18 to 24, 23.9% from 25 to 44, 25.1% from 45 to 64, and 25.3% who were 65 years of age or older. The median age was 45 years. For every 100 females there were 77.4 males. For every 100 females age 18 and over, there were 75.2 males.

The median income for a household in the town was $33,063, and the median income for a family was $39,625. Males had a median income of $30,556 versus $17,375 for females. The per capita income for the town was $20,546. About 6.4% of families and 9.8% of the population were below the poverty line, including 13.8% of those under age 18 and 10.0% of those age 65 or over.

== Notable people ==
- J. Hartwell Harrison, M.D.; was instrumental in the world's first kidney transplant
- Jerome Kersey, professional basketball player
- Willie Arthur Royster, professional baseball catcher who played four games for the 1981 Baltimore Orioles while spending eleven seasons in the minor leagues

== Climate ==
The climate in this area is characterized by hot, humid summers and generally mild to cool winters. According to the Köppen Climate Classification system, Clarksville has a humid subtropical climate, abbreviated "Cfa" on climate maps.

Climate data for Clarksville, Virginia (1991–2020 normals, extremes 1948–present)
Month	Jan	Feb	Mar	Apr	May	Jun	Jul	Aug	Sep	Oct	Nov	Dec	Year
Record high °F (°C)	84 (29)	81 (27)	89 (32)	92 (33)	98 (37)	106 (41)	107 (42)	106 (41)	100 (38)	100 (38)	86 (30)	80 (27)	107 (42)
Mean daily maximum °F (°C)	50.2 (10.1)	54.3 (12.4)	62.1 (16.7)	71.9 (22.2)	78.3 (25.7)	86.0 (30.0)	89.9 (32.2)	88.1 (31.2)	82.3 (27.9)	72.5 (22.5)	62.6 (17.0)	53.4 (11.9)	71.0 (21.7)
Daily mean °F (°C)	39.3 (4.1)	42.2 (5.7)	49.5 (9.7)	59.0 (15.0)	67.3 (19.6)	75.2 (24.0)	79.6 (26.4)	77.7 (25.4)	71.9 (22.2)	60.4 (15.8)	50.3 (10.2)	42.5 (5.8)	59.6 (15.3)
Mean daily minimum °F (°C)	28.4 (−2.0)	30.2 (−1.0)	36.9 (2.7)	46.2 (7.9)	56.2 (13.4)	64.4 (18.0)	69.3 (20.7)	67.4 (19.7)	61.5 (16.4)	48.2 (9.0)	38.0 (3.3)	31.6 (−0.2)	48.2 (9.0)
Record low °F (°C)	2 (−17)	3 (−16)	14 (−10)	20 (−7)	36 (2)	43 (6)	55 (13)	49 (9)	38 (3)	24 (−4)	14 (−10)	10 (−12)	2 (−17)
Average precipitation inches (mm)	3.30 (84)	2.87 (73)	3.85 (98)	3.47 (88)	4.61 (117)	5.19 (132)	4.37 (111)	3.29 (84)	4.76 (121)	3.76 (96)	3.24 (82)	3.59 (91)	46.30 (1,176)
Average snowfall inches (cm)	1.9 (4.8)	1.1 (2.8)	0.3 (0.76)	0.0 (0.0)	0.0 (0.0)	0.0 (0.0)	0.0 (0.0)	0.0 (0.0)	0.0 (0.0)	0.0 (0.0)	0.0 (0.0)	0.4 (1.0)	3.7 (9.4)
Average precipitation days (≥ 0.01 in)	7.9	7.5	8.0	7.5	8.4	7.5	8.3	6.7	6.2	6.1	6.2	7.5	87.8
Average snowy days (≥ 0.1 in)	0.8	0.6	0.4	0.0	0.0	0.0	0.0	0.0	0.0	0.0	0.0	0.3	2.1
Source: NOAA

== Twin town ==
- Zugló, Hungary (2023)
