= Elm Hill (Baskerville, Virginia) =

Historic house in Virginia, United States

- U.S. National Register of Historic Places
- Virginia Landmarks Register
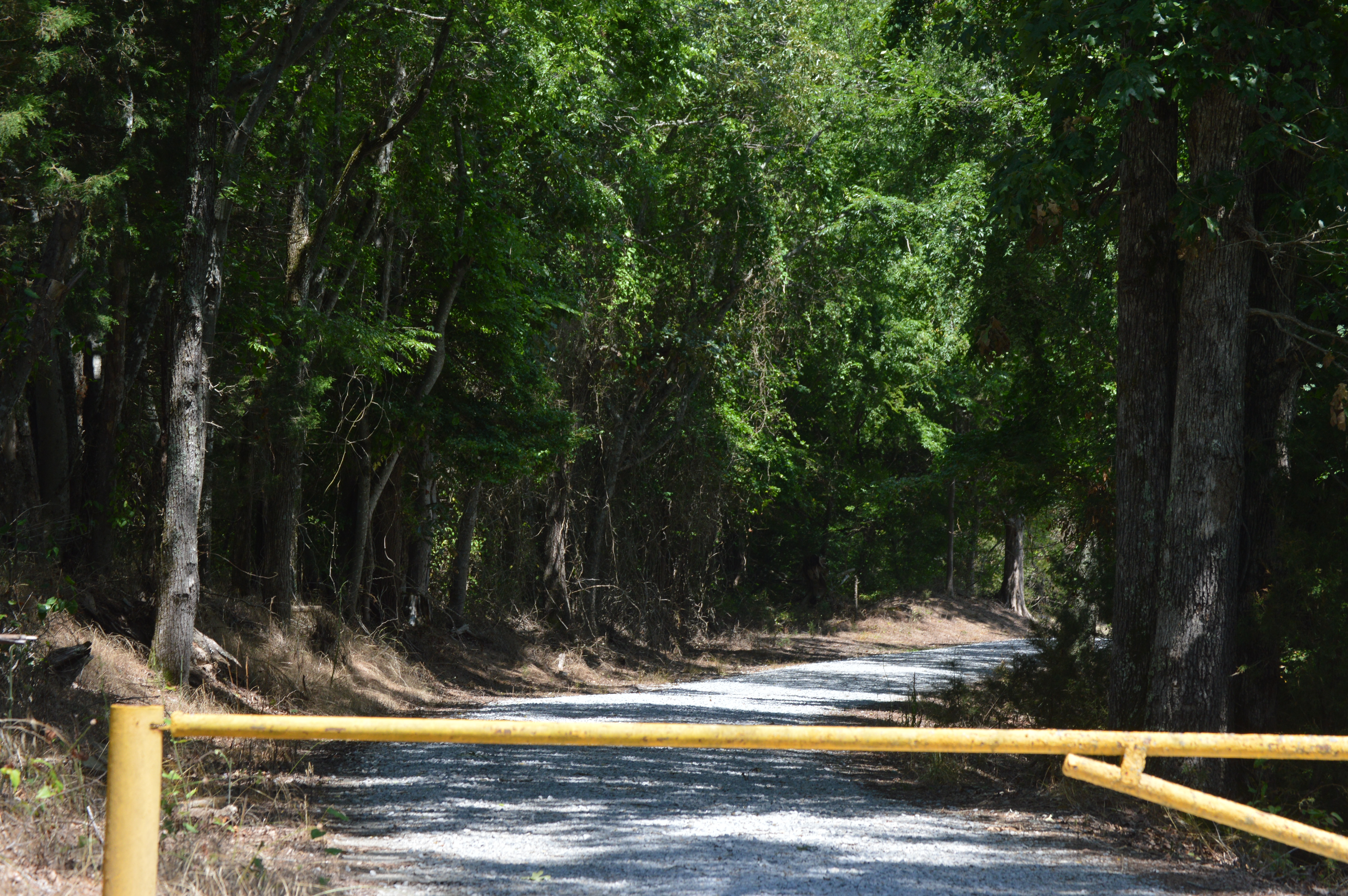
- Property entrance

- Location within Virginia Location within the United States
- Location: SE of Baskerville off VA 4, near Baskerville, Virginia
- Coordinates: 36°36′38″N 78°17′37″W
- Area: 4 acres (1.6 ha)
- Built: 1800
- NRHP reference No.: 79003053
- VLR No.: 058-0066

Significant dates
- Added to NRHP: July 27, 1979
- Designated VLR: May 15, 1979

Elm Hill is a historic home located near Baskerville, Mecklenburg County, Virginia. It was built about 1800, and is a frame dwelling and consists of a central two-story, three-bay block flanked by one-story, one-bay wings, and backed by a two-story, two-bay ell. It is set on rubble stone underpinnings, and features massive sandstone chimneys at either end of the main block. Also on the property are a contributing pair of smokehouses.

It was listed on the National Register of Historic Places in 1979.

The house was destroyed by fire on June 25, 2014.
