= Mecklenburg County, Virginia =

County in the United States

- County
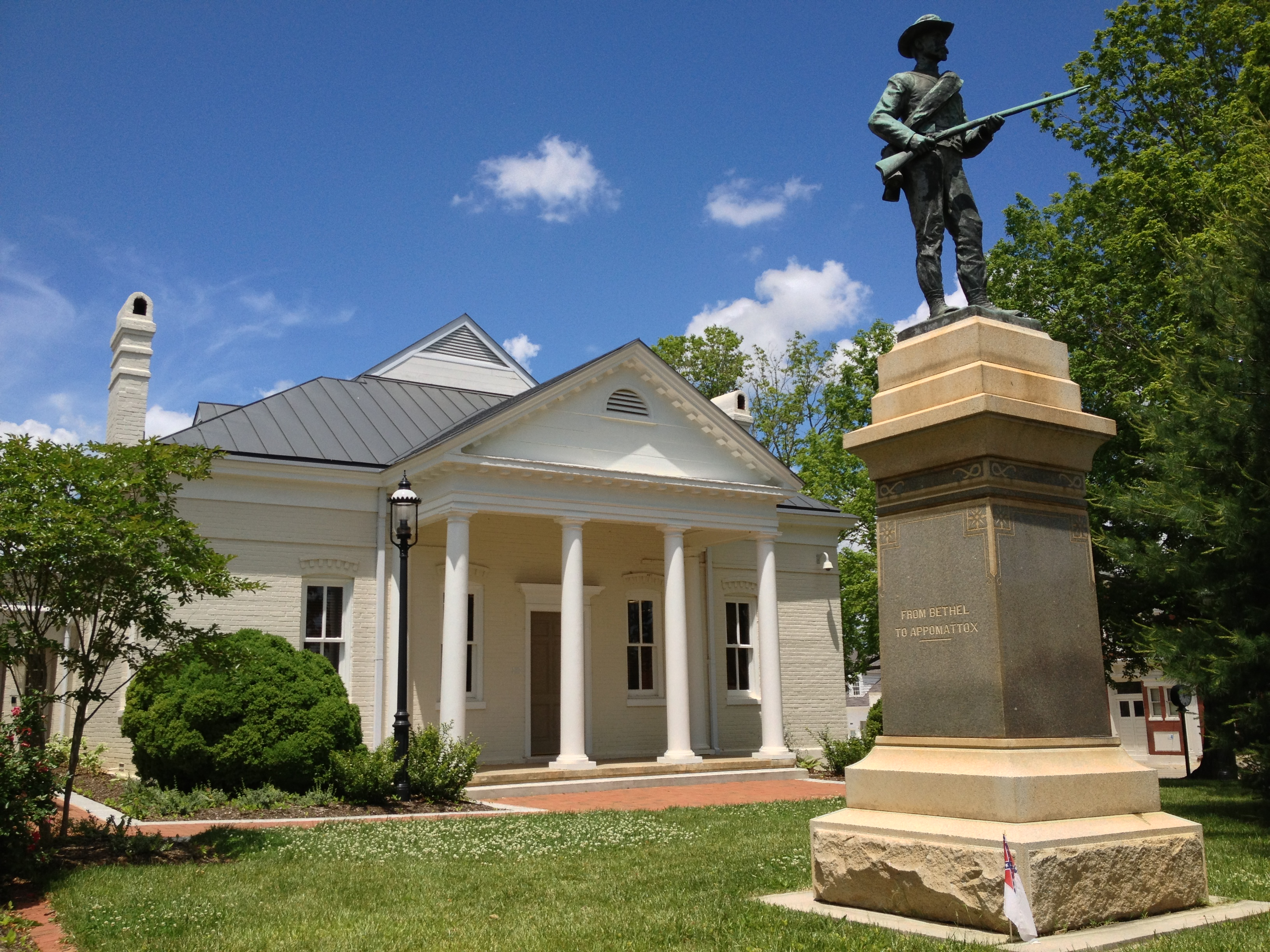
- Mecklenburg County Courthouse and Confederate Monument

- Seal

- Location within the U.S. state of Virginia
- Coordinates: 36°41′N 78°22′W
- Country: United States
- State: Virginia
- Founded: 1765
- Named for: Charlotte of Mecklenburg-Strelitz
- Seat: Boydton
- Largest town: South Hill

Area
  - Total: 679 sq mi (1,760 km^{2})
  - Land: 625 sq mi (1,620 km^{2})
  - Water: 54 sq mi (140 km^{2}) 7.9%

Population (2020)
  - Total: 30,319
  - Estimate (2025): 30,747 ▲
  - Density: 45/sq mi (17/km^{2})
- Time zone: UTC−5 (Eastern)
  - Summer (DST): UTC−4 (EDT)
- Congressional district: 5th
- Website: www.mecklenburgva.com

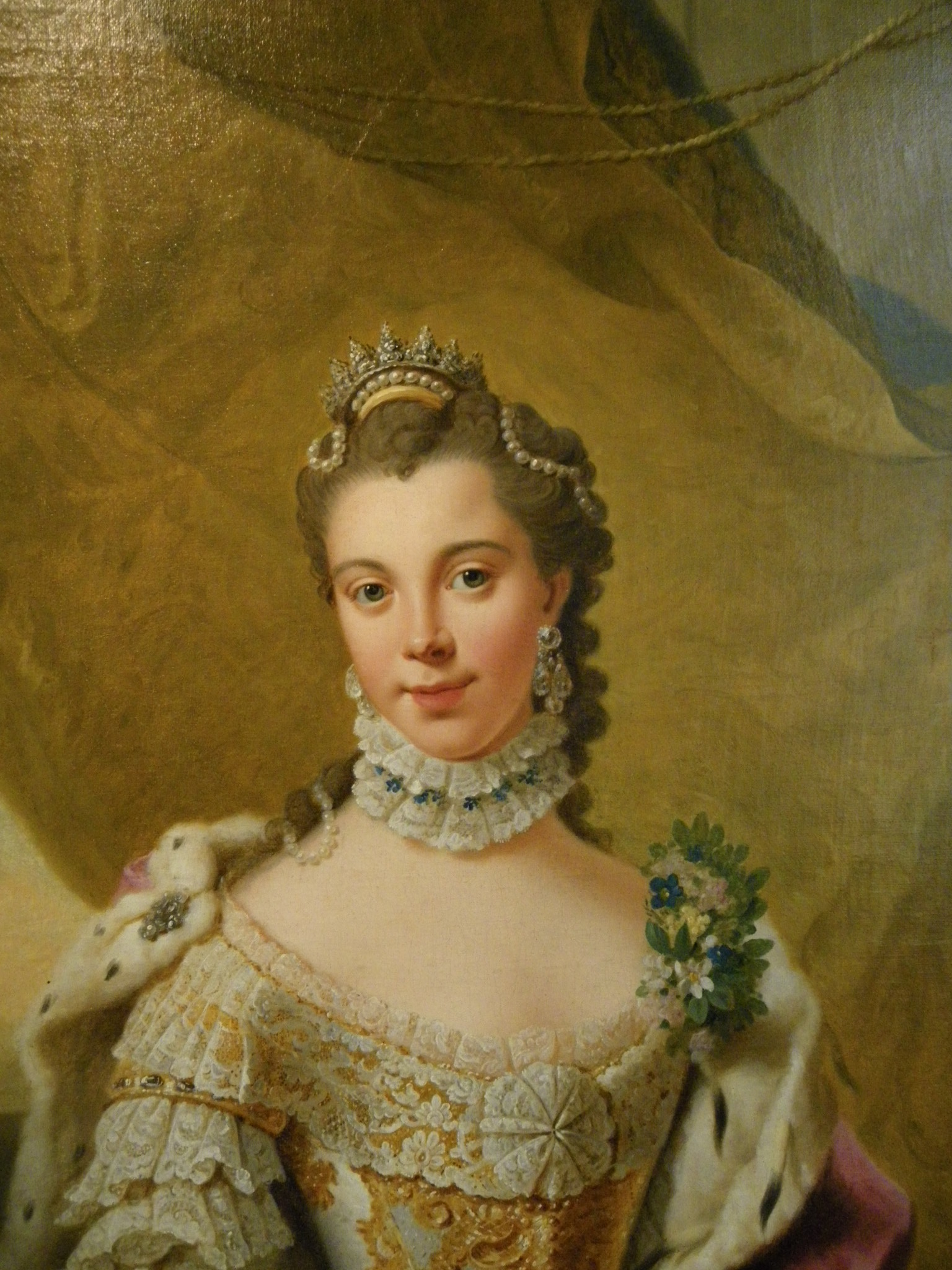
Queen Charlotte of Mecklenburg, the county's namesake

Mecklenburg County is a county in the Commonwealth of Virginia. As of the 2020 census, the population was 30,319. Its county seat is Boydton.

== History ==
Mecklenburg County was organized on March 1, 1765, having split from Lunenburg County in 1764 as the result of the passage of an act by the Virginia General Assembly. Due to new settlement and population increases in the area, the legislature divided Lunenburg into three counties: Lunenburg, Charlotte, and Mecklenburg. It was named after Charlotte of Mecklenburg-Strelitz, a British queen of German origin.

The first county government consisted of 13 members: Robert Munford, Richard Witton, John Speed, Henry Delony, Edmund Taylor, Benjamin Baird, John Camp, Thomas Erskine, John Potter, John Cox, Thomas Anderson, John Speed, Jr., and Samuel Hopkins, with Benjamin Baird acting as the first mayor.

== Government ==
Mecklenburg County is governed by a nine-member Board of Supervisors, each elected from a single-member district. They serve as the county's legislative and policy body, enacting laws, ordinances, and taxes. They appoint a county administrator to conduct day-to-day operations. Alex Gottschalk is the current county administrator and Judy P. Sheffield is the current assistant county administrator.

The board members are:

- District 1 - Andy R. Hargrove
- District 2 - Glanzy M. Spain, Jr.―Vice Chairman
- District 3 - Tom Tanner
- District 4 - Claudia H. Lundy
- District 5 - Glenn E. Barbour—Chairman
- District 6 - Sterling Wilkinson
- District 7 - James D. Jennings
- District 8 - David A. Brankley
- District 9 - Charles Jones

=== Constitutional officers ===
Mecklenburg County operates under what is commonly referred as the "traditional form" of county government under the Virginia Constitution, under which voters elect five countywide "constitutional officers":

- Clerk of Circuit Court - Michelle Gordon
- Commonwealth's Attorney - Allen Nash
- Commissioner of Revenue - Lisa Carlton Wagstaff
- Treasurer - Marsha Coleman Seamans
- Sheriff - Robert (Bobby) Hawkins

=== County departments and department heads ===
Listed below are the County facilities, the department housed in that facility and its head.

- Goode Bank Building
  - Board of Supervisors (See Supervisor's List Above)
  - County Administrator's Office- Alex Gottschalk (Administrator)
  - Economic Development Director's Office- Angela D. Kellett (Director)
  - Tourism Office- Tina Morgan (Coordinator)
  - Building Inspector's Office- Eddie Harris (Chief Inspector)
  - Zoning Administrator's Office- Josh Tanner (Zoning Administrator)
  - Animal Warden's Office- Doug Blanton (Animal Warden)
  - Information Technology Department (IT) - Alex Wells (IT Specialist)
- Courthouse
  - Circuit Court-Leslie M. Osborn (Judge)
  - Circuit Court Clerk's Office- Michelle Gordon (Clerk)
  - Commonwealth Attorney's Office- J. Miller (Commonwealth's Attorney)
- Mark I. Burnett Building
  - Commissioner of Revenue's Office- Lisa Carlton Wagstaff (Commissioner)
    - Real Estate Department- Jo Harrell McLellan (Chief Deputy Commissioner/Real Estate Assessor)
    - Personal Property Department- Violet Puryear(Chief Deputy Commissioner)
  - Treasurer's Office- Marsha Coleman Seamans(Treasurer)
  - VPI Extension Office- C. Taylor Clarke (Unit Coordinator/ANR Extension Agent)
- Hudgins Court Facility
  - Social Services- Sandra S. Gregory (Director)
  - General District Court- Charles Warren (Judge)
    - General District Clerk's Office- Tammy T. Taylor (Clerk)
  - Juvenile & Domestic Court- M. Rand (Judge), S. Anderson Nelson (Judge)
    - J&D Court Clerk's Office- Rebecca D. Inge (Clerk)
    - J&D Court Service Unit
  - Sheriff's Office- R.W. (Bobby) Hawkins (Sheriff)
- 911 Center
  - 911 Emergency Communications Office and Dispatch- Ben Duncan (Director)
- Jail
  - Jail Division of the Sheriff's Office- Roosevelt Terry (Jail Captain)
- Post Office Building
  - Piedmont Court Services- Jackie T. Boxley (Director)
- White Building
  - Voter Registrar- Jason Corwin (General Registrar)

== Politics ==
United States presidential election results for Mecklenburg County, Virginia
Year	Republican		Democratic		Third party(ies)	
Year	No.	%	No.	%	No.	%
1912	191	14.39%	1,039	78.30%	97	7.31%
1916	222	14.38%	1,317	85.30%	5	0.32%
1920	264	13.97%	1,619	85.66%	7	0.37%
1924	286	14.62%	1,649	84.30%	21	1.07%
1928	784	30.91%	1,752	69.09%	0	0.00%
1932	275	11.10%	2,188	88.30%	15	0.61%
1936	202	6.88%	2,730	93.05%	2	0.07%
1940	308	11.35%	2,402	88.54%	3	0.11%
1944	430	14.38%	2,561	85.62%	0	0.00%
1948	513	16.80%	2,117	69.34%	423	13.86%
1952	1,891	42.46%	2,525	56.69%	38	0.85%
1956	1,498	33.78%	2,004	45.20%	932	21.02%
1960	1,936	42.70%	2,533	55.87%	65	1.43%
1964	4,976	60.48%	3,238	39.36%	13	0.16%
1968	2,750	29.01%	2,667	28.14%	4,061	42.85%
1972	6,381	68.55%	2,804	30.12%	124	1.33%
1976	4,423	50.44%	4,076	46.48%	270	3.08%
1980	4,853	54.45%	3,790	42.52%	270	3.03%
1984	6,777	65.69%	3,438	33.33%	101	0.98%
1988	5,887	63.45%	3,275	35.30%	116	1.25%
1992	5,401	49.23%	4,273	38.95%	1,296	11.81%
1996	4,933	48.00%	4,408	42.89%	937	9.12%
2000	6,600	56.63%	4,797	41.16%	257	2.21%
2004	7,319	57.27%	5,293	41.42%	168	1.31%
2008	7,817	51.83%	7,127	47.26%	138	0.91%
2012	7,973	52.88%	6,921	45.90%	183	1.21%
2016	8,288	55.46%	6,285	42.05%	372	2.49%
2020	9,266	57.18%	6,803	41.98%	135	0.83%
2024	9,791	60.05%	6,404	39.28%	109	0.67%

== Education ==
The county's education department is the Mecklenburg County Public Schools. It is managed by the Board of Education. Scott Worner is the County Schools Superintendent.

== Geography ==
According to the U.S. Census Bureau, the county has an area of 679 square miles (1,760 km^{2}), of which 625 square miles (1,620 km^{2}) is land and 54 square miles (140 km^{2}) (7.9%) is water.

=== Adjacent counties ===
- Lunenburg County - north
- Brunswick County - east
- Warren County, North Carolina - southeast
- Vance County, North Carolina - south
- Granville County, North Carolina - southwest
- Halifax County - west
- Charlotte County - northwest

=== Major highways ===
- I-85
- US 1
- US 15
- US 58
- SR 4 (U.S. Bicycle Route 1)
- SR 47
- SR 49
- SR 92
- SR 138

== Demographics ==
Historical population
Census	Pop.	Note	%±
1790	14,733		—
1800	17,008		15.4%
1810	18,453		8.5%
1820	19,786		7.2%
1830	20,477		3.5%
1840	20,724		1.2%
1850	20,630		−0.5%
1860	20,096		−2.6%
1870	21,318		6.1%
1880	24,610		15.4%
1890	25,359		3.0%
1900	26,551		4.7%
1910	28,956		9.1%
1920	31,208		7.8%
1930	32,622		4.5%
1940	31,933		−2.1%
1950	33,497		4.9%
1960	31,428		−6.2%
1970	29,426		−6.4%
1980	29,444		0.1%
1990	29,241		−0.7%
2000	32,280		10.4%
2010	32,727		1.4%
2020	30,319		−7.4%
2025 (est.)	30,747	▲	1.4%
U.S. Decennial Census; 1790-1960 1900-1990; 1990-2000 2010 2020

=== Racial and ethnic composition ===
Mecklenburg County, Virginia – Racial and ethnic composition Note: the US Census treats Hispanic/Latino as an ethnic category. This table excludes Latinos from the racial categories and assigns them to a separate category. Hispanics/Latinos may be of any race.
Race / Ethnicity (NH = Non-Hispanic)	Pop 1980	Pop 1990	Pop 2000	Pop 2010	Pop 2020	% 1980	% 1990	% 2000	% 2010	% 2020
White alone (NH)	17,449	17,873	19,017	19,215	17,864	59.26%	61.12%	58.73%	58.71%	58.92%
Black or African American alone (NH)	11,640	11,192	12,589	11,958	10,364	39.53%	38.28%	38.88%	36.54%	34.18%
Native American or Alaska Native alone (NH)	6	20	61	73	73	0.02%	0.07%	0.19%	0.22%	0.24%
Asian alone (NH)	28	47	95	213	205	0.10%	0.16%	0.29%	0.65%	0.68%
Native Hawaiian or Pacific Islander alone (NH)	x	x	4	10	0	x	x	0.01%	0.03%	0.00%
Other race alone (NH)	9	1	31	22	110	0.03%	0.00%	0.10%	0.07%	0.36%
Mixed race or Multiracial (NH)	x	x	190	430	882	x	x	0.59%	1.31%	2.91%
Hispanic or Latino (any race)	312	108	393	806	821	1.06%	0.37%	1.21%	2.46%	2.71%
Total	29,444	29,241	32,380	32,727	30,319	100.00%	100.00%	100.00%	100.00%	100.00%

=== 2020 census ===
As of the 2020 census, the county had a population of 30,319. The median age was 49.8 years. 18.4% of residents were under the age of 18 and 26.9% of residents were 65 years of age or older. For every 100 females there were 93.2 males, and for every 100 females age 18 and over there were 91.2 males age 18 and over.

The racial makeup of the county was 59.5% White, 34.4% Black or African American, 0.2% American Indian and Alaska Native, 0.7% Asian, 0.0% Native Hawaiian and Pacific Islander, 1.6% from some other race, and 3.6% from two or more races. Hispanic or Latino residents of any race comprised 2.7% of the population.

16.7% of residents lived in urban areas, while 83.3% lived in rural areas.

There were 13,236 households in the county, of which 23.2% had children under the age of 18 living with them and 32.3% had a female householder with no spouse or partner present. About 32.6% of all households were made up of individuals and 17.2% had someone living alone who was 65 years of age or older.

There were 19,004 housing units, of which 30.4% were vacant. Among occupied housing units, 70.3% were owner-occupied and 29.7% were renter-occupied. The homeowner vacancy rate was 2.0% and the rental vacancy rate was 8.3%.

=== 2010 census ===
As of the census of 2010, there were 32,727 people, 12,951 households, and 8,962 families residing in the county. The population density was 52 people per square mile (20 people/km^{2}). There were 17,403 housing units at an average density of 28 units per square mile (11 units/km^{2}). The racial makeup of the county was 59.24% White, 39.08% Black or African American, 0.21% Native American, 0.30% Asian, 0.01% Pacific Islander, 0.48% from other races, and 0.68% from two or more races. 1.21% of the population were Hispanic or Latino of any race.

There were 12,951 households, out of which 26.50% had children under the age of 18 living with them, 51.00% were married couples living together, 14.10% had a female householder with no husband present, and 30.80% were non-families. 27.20% of all households were made up of individuals, and 13.20% had someone living alone who was 65 years of age or older. The average household size was 2.38 and the average family size was 2.87.

In the county, the population was spread out, with 21.60% under the age of 18, 7.20% from 18 to 24, 27.40% from 25 to 44, 26.00% from 45 to 64, and 17.80% who were 65 years of age or older. The median age was 41 years. For every 100 females there were 97.30 males. For every 100 females age 18 and over, there were 96.50 males.

The median income for a household in the county was $31,380, and the median income for a family was $37,752. Males had a median income of $26,852 versus $19,609 for females. The per capita income for the county was $17,171. About 11.60% of families and 15.50% of the population were below the poverty line, including 20.60% of those under age 18 and 17.30% of those age 65 or over.

== Communities ==
=== Towns ===
- Boydton (county seat)
- Brodnax (partial)
- Chase City
- Clarksville
- La Crosse
- South Hill

=== Census-designated places ===
- Baskerville
- Bracey
- Fairview
- Thynedale
- Union Level

=== Other unincorporated communities ===
- Buffalo Junction
- Nelson
- Palmer Springs
- Shiny Rock
- Skipwith

== See also ==
- Mecklenburg County Sheriff's Office
- National Register of Historic Places listings in Mecklenburg County, Virginia
