= List of school divisions in Virginia =

This is a complete list of school divisions in the U.S. state of Virginia, organized by the regions into which the Virginia Department of Education groups them.

== About school divisions ==
Virginia's public K-12 schools are neither operated directly by the state government nor by special districts. Instead, most are organized as political subdivisions known as "school divisions" which are similar to school districts in some other states.

The only independent government school district under Virginia law is the Eastern Virginia Medical College. All of the K-12 school districts are classified as dependent public school systems by the U.S. Census Bureau. Each public school division is associated with one or more of the counties, independent cities and incorporated towns in Virginia, with major portions of their funding (and in many instances other services) provided through those local entities.

Each school division is overseen by a school board, whose members are either appointed by the elected officials of the participating local entities or by public elections. A Superintendent of Schools (Division Superintendent) is customarily the highest-ranking employee of a school division.

All listings are for city or county school divisions, except:

- The Williamsburg-James City County Public Schools, jointly administered by the City of Williamsburg and James City County, and
- The Colonial Beach and West Point school divisions, which are respectively associated with the incorporated towns of Colonial Beach and West Point.

The Fairfax County Public Schools, part of the government of Fairfax County, also serve the City of Fairfax under a contract between the city and county.

The Greensville County Public Schools also serve the City of Emporia.

== Region 1 - Central Virginia ==
- Charles City County Public Schools
- Chesterfield County Public Schools
- Colonial Heights Public Schools
- Dinwiddie County Public Schools
- Goochland County Public Schools
- Hanover County Public Schools
- Henrico County Public Schools
- Hopewell Public Schools
- New Kent County Public Schools
- Petersburg City Public Schools
- Powhatan County Public Schools
- Prince George County Public Schools
- Richmond Public Schools
- Surry County Public Schools
- Sussex County Public Schools

== Region 2 - Tidewater ==
- Accomack County Public Schools
- Chesapeake Public Schools
- Franklin City Public Schools
- Hampton City Schools
- Isle of Wight County Public Schools
- Newport News Public Schools
- Norfolk Public Schools
- Northampton County Public Schools
- Poquoson City Public Schools
- Portsmouth Public Schools
- Southampton County Public Schools
- Suffolk City Public Schools
- Virginia Beach City Public Schools
- Williamsburg-James City County Public Schools
- York County School Division

== Region 3 - Northern Neck ==
- Caroline County Public Schools
- Colonial Beach Public Schools
- Essex County Public Schools
- Fredericksburg City Public Schools
- Gloucester County Public Schools
- King and Queen County Public Schools
- King George County Schools
- King William County Public Schools
- Lancaster County Public Schools
- Mathews County Public Schools
- Middlesex County Public Schools
- Northumberland County Public Schools
- Richmond County Public Schools
- Spotsylvania County Public Schools
- Stafford County Public Schools
- West Point Public Schools
- Westmoreland County Public Schools

== Region 4 - Northern Virginia ==
- Alexandria City Public Schools
- Arlington County Public Schools
- Clarke County Public Schools
- Culpeper County Public Schools
- Fairfax County Public Schools
- Falls Church City Public Schools
- Fauquier County Public Schools
- Frederick County Public Schools
- Loudoun County Public Schools
- Madison County Public Schools
- Manassas City Public Schools
- Manassas Park City Schools
- Orange County Public Schools
- Page County Public Schools
- Prince William County Public Schools
- Rappahannock County Public Schools
- Shenandoah County Public Schools
- Warren County Public Schools
- Winchester Public Schools

== Region 5 - Valley ==
- Albemarle County Public Schools
- Amherst County Public Schools
- Augusta County Public Schools
- Bath County Public Schools
- Bedford County Public Schools
- Buena Vista City Public Schools
- Campbell County Public Schools
- Charlottesville City Schools
- Fluvanna County Public Schools
- Greene County Public Schools
- Harrisonburg City Public Schools
- Highland County Public Schools
- Lexington City Schools
- Louisa County Public Schools
- Lynchburg City Schools
- Nelson County Public Schools
- Rockbridge County Public Schools
- Rockingham County Public Schools
- Staunton City Schools
- Waynesboro Public Schools

== Region 6 - Western Virginia ==
- Alleghany County Public Schools
- Botetourt County Public Schools
- Covington City Public Schools
- Craig County Public Schools
- Danville Public Schools
- Floyd County Public Schools
- Franklin County Public Schools
- Henry County Public Schools
- Martinsville City Public Schools
- Montgomery County Public Schools
- Patrick County Public Schools
- Pittsylvania County Schools
- Roanoke City Public Schools
- Roanoke County Public Schools
- Salem City Schools

== Region 7 - Southwest ==
- Bland County Public Schools
- Bristol Virginia Public Schools
- Buchanan County Public Schools
- Carroll County Public Schools
- Dickenson County Public Schools
- Galax City Public Schools
- Giles County Public Schools
- Grayson County Public Schools
- Lee County Public Schools
- Norton City Schools
- Pulaski County Public Schools
- Radford City Public Schools
- Russell County Public Schools
- Scott County Public Schools
- Smyth County Schools
- Tazewell County Public Schools
- Washington County Public Schools
- Wise County Public Schools
- Wythe County Public Schools

== Region 8 - Southside ==
- Amelia County Public Schools
- Appomattox County Public Schools
- Brunswick County Public Schools
- Buckingham County Public Schools
- Charlotte County Public Schools
- Cumberland County Public Schools
- Greensville County Public Schools
- Halifax County Public Schools
- Lunenburg County Public Schools
- Mecklenburg County Public Schools
- Nottoway County Public Schools
- Prince Edward County Public Schools

== See also ==
- Governor's Schools (Virginia)
