= Tri-Rivers District =

High school sports conference in Virginia, US

The Tri-Rivers District is a high school conference in the state of Virginia that comprises high schools in Southeastern Virginia west of the Hampton Roads metropolitan area. The Tri-Rivers District schools compete in Region 1B with the schools from the Bull Run District, the Dogwood District, the James River District, the Shenandoah District, and the Tidewater District of the Virginia High School League.

== Member schools ==
| School | Location | Mascot | Colors |
|---|---|---|---|
| Appomattox Regional Governor's School | Petersburg | Dragons | |
| Brunswick High School | Lawrenceville | Bulldog | |
| Franklin High School | Franklin | Broncos | |
| Greensville High School | Emporia | Eagles | |
| Southampton High School | Courtland | Indians | |
| Surry County High School | Dendron | Cougars | |
| Sussex Central High School | Sussex | Tigers | |
| Windsor High School | Windsor | Dukes | |

== Former Members ==
| School | Location | Mascot | Colors |
|---|---|---|---|
| Park View High School | South Hill | Dragons | |
| Charles City High School | Charles City | Panthers | |
| Chesterfield Community High School | Chester | Eagles | |

== Champions ==
| Season | Baseball | Boys Basketball | Girls Basketball | Football | Soccer | Softball |
|---|---|---|---|---|---|---|
| 2025 | Undecided | Greensville (13–1) | Greensville (13–1) | Southampton (6–0) | Undecided | Undecided |
| 2024 | Southampton (13–0) | Brunswick (15–2) | Brunswick (14–0) | Sussex Central (5–0) | Southampton (12–0) | Southampton (11–0) |
| 2023 | Southampton (14–0) | Franklin (14–0) | Brunswick (15–0) | Southampton (6–0) | Southampton (9–3) | Windsor (14–0) |
| 2022 | Southampton (12–2) | Greensville (11–0) | Greensville (10–2) | Sussex Central (4–0) | ARGS (12–0) | Windsor (10–0) |
| 2021 | Southampton (5–1) | None | None | None | ARGS (5–0) | None |
| 2020 | None | Greensville (16–1) | Surry (16–0) | Greensville (6–1) | None | None |
| 2019 | None | Surry (17–0) | Surry (18–0) | Park View (8–0) | None | Park View (18–2) |
| 2018 | Southampton (12–2) | Park View (17–0) | Surry (16–1) | Southampton (6–1) | None | Southampton (11–0) |

Note: These champions and records may not be correct as the record are from Maxpreps which is open for anyone to edit
