= Southside District =

AA athletics district in Virginia

The AA Southside District is one of the four districts of AA Region I of the Virginia High School League. While most of the other teams in Region I are located in Hampton Roads, these high schools are found in the Southside region of Virginia southwest of Richmond. The schools in the Southside District compete with the schools in the AA Battlefield District, AA Bay Rivers District, and the A/AA Eastern Shore District.

== Member schools ==
School	Location	Founded	Enrollment	Nickname	Colors
Bluestone High School	Skipwith, Mecklenburg County, VA	1955	749	Barons	Blue & Gold
Brunswick High School	Lawrenceville, Brunswick County, VA	–	619	Bulldogs	Light Blue & White
Greensville County High School	Emporia, VA	–	750	Eagles	Green & Gold
Nottoway County High School	Crewe, Nottoway County, VA	–	724	Cougars	Maroon & Gold
Park View High School–South Hill	South Hill, Mecklenburg County, VA	1957	1,240	Dragons	Green & White
Powhatan High School	Powhatan, Powhatan County, VA	–	1,450	Indians	Black & Orange
Prince Edward County High School	Farmville, Prince Edward County, VA	–	752	Eagles	Purple & Gold
Southampton High School	Courtland, Southampton County, VA	1955	886	Indians	Red & White
