= James River District =

The James River District (JRD) is a high school athletic conference of the Virginia High School League with most schools based in the Southside Virginia region. All of the James River District schools are relatively small with enrollments under 1,000. The schools in the James River District compete in Region 1B with the schools of the Bull Run District, the Dogwood District, the Shenandoah District, the Tidewater District, and the Tri-Rivers District.

== History ==
The original James River District was created in 1970 when the Virginia High School league reorganized into AAA, AA, and A classifications. Original schools included Fluvanna, Goochland, Amelia, Powhatan, Cumberland, Buckingham, and Prince Edward. Clover Hill and Lunenburg-Central became district members a few years later. The James River District was reorganized in 1999 with seven charter members, Central High School (also known as Lunenburg or Lunenburg Central), Prince Edward County High School, Buckingham High School, Amelia County High School, Randolph-Henry High School, and Cumberland High School. After the 1999 season, Prince Edward moved to a different district. Membership remained the same until the 2009 season when Goochland High School moved to a different conference, which left Amelia, Buckingham, Randolph-Henry, Cumberland, and Lunenburg. In 2011, Goochland rejoined the James River District along with Nottoway & Bluestone High School(s). Before the 2015 season, Prince Edward re-joined the James River District after spending 14 years in a different conference. After the 2020-21 schoolyear, Goochland left the conference and joined the Jefferson District. Bluestone High School left the James River District after the 2021-2022 schoolyear due to the school consolidating with nearby Park View High School to form Mecklenburg High School. Cumberland High School did not field a team during the 2024 season due to low participation rates.

== Member schools ==
| School | Location | Founded | Nickname | Colors | Classification |
|---|---|---|---|---|---|
| Amelia County High School | Amelia Court House, Virginia | 1969 | Raiders | Yellow & Green | 2A |
| Buckingham County High School | Buckingham, Virginia | | Knights | Green & Yellow | 2B |
| Central High School (Lunenburg) | Victoria, Virginia | | Chargers | Purple & Gold | 2B |
| Cumberland High School | Cumberland, Virginia | | Dukes | Blue & White | 1B |
| Nottoway County High School | Crewe, Virginia | | Cougars | Maroon & Yellow | 2A |
| Prince Edward County High School | Farmville, Virginia | | Eagles | Purple & Gold | 2A |
| Randolph-Henry High School | Charlotte Court House, Virginia | 1938 | Statesmen | Navy Blue & White | 2A |

School classification abides by the schools enrollment, which is the number in case. The letters such as A & B represent each region a school is located in.

== Former members ==
| School | Location | Founded | Nickname | Colors | Classification | Tenure |
|---|---|---|---|---|---|---|
| Bluestone High School | Skipwith, Virginia | 1955 | Barons | Navy Blue & Yellow | 2A | 2011-2021 |
| Goochland High School | Goochland, Virginia | | Bulldogs | Red & White | 3A | |

== Conference champions ==
| Season | Football |
|---|---|
| 1999 | Lunenburg (8–1) |
| 2000 | Lunenburg (8–3) |
| 2001 | Buckingham (8–3) |
| 2002 | Buckingham (12–2) |
| 2003 | Lunenburg (9–3) |
| 2004 | Goochland (8–4) |
| 2005 | Goochland (10–1) |
| 2006 | Goochland (14–0) |
| 2007 | Goochland (10–0) |
| 2008 | Cumberland (8–2) |
| 2009 | Buckingham (10–1) |
| 2010 | Amelia (7–4) |
| 2011 | Goochland (13–1) |
| 2012 | Goochland (13–1) |
| 2013 | Goochland (9–3) |
| 2014 | Nottoway (11–3) |
| 2015 | Buckingham (10–2) |
| 2016 | Goochland (12–1) |
| 2017 | Goochland (11–1) |
| 2018 | Goochland (13–1) |
| 2019 | Goochland (6–1) |
| 2021 | Nottoway (7–1) |
| 2022 | Lunenburg (6–0) |
| 2023 | Buckingham (6–0) |
| 2024 | Buckingham (7–0) |

== See also ==
- Virginia High School League
