= Russell Grove High School =

Address
- 8740 Otterburn Road; Amelia Court House, Virginia 23002

Information
- Established: 1865
- Enrollment: 227 (1969)

Russell Grove High School was an all African American high school located in Amelia Court House, Virginia.

== History ==
Prior to the integration of public schools in 1969, education for black students was sparse in rural Virginia. In 1865, widowed by her fallen husband, who had been a Union army officer, Samantha Jane Neil began educating freed slaves in Amelia County. The school was very primitive in its earlier days; chalkboards were nothing but walls that were painted black, and students had to sit on hardwood flooring. Despite being a school for black students, most of the faculty were white until 1934.

In 1892, Ingleside Seminary opened in Burkeville, Virginia, for young black women of Amelia and Nottoway counties to receive a secondary education; a historical marker sits near the former site. The original Russell Grove School, also known as Russell Grove Presbyterian Church, was restored in 2017.

In 1933, Russell Grove High School was built on land purchased by the parents of Russell Grove students. By 1950, the school's curriculum expanded to include vocational school, college preparatory classes, and after-school athletics.

In 1969, Russell Grove students were integrated into the all-white Amelia High School, marking the end of segregated public schools in Amelia County. The Russell Grove building still stands today and serves as office space for the Amelia County Public School District.
