= Greene County Schools =

Greene County Schools or Greene County School District may refer to:

- Greene County School District (Alabama)
- Greene County School District (Georgia)
- Greene County Community School District in Iowa
- Greene County School District (Mississippi)
- Greene County Schools (North Carolina)
- Greene County Schools (Tennessee)
- Greene County Public Schools in Virginia
- Greene County Tech School District in Arkansas
