= Greensville County High School =

High school in Emporia, Virginia

Coordinates: 36°40′46.5″N 77°33′9.8″W

Location
- 403 Harding Street; Emporia, Virginia 23847

Information
- School type: Public high school
- School district: Greensville County School Division
- Principal: Dana Hawes
- Grades: 9–12
- Enrollment: 718 (2016-17)
- Language: English
- Colors: Green and yellow
- Mascot: Eagle
- Rival: Brunswick High School, Park View High School
- Athletic Conference: Southside District; Region I
- Website: Official Site

Greensville County High School is a public high school located in Emporia, Virginia, serving that city and Greensville County. It is part of the Greensville County School Division and opened in 1976. Athletic teams compete in the Virginia High School League's AA Southside District in Region I.
