= Joe Reed (wide receiver) =

American football player (born 1998)

No. 12
- Position: Wide receiver

Personal information
- Born: January 4, 1998 (age 28); Charlotte Court House, Virginia, U.S.
- Listed height: 6 ft 0 in (1.83 m)
- Listed weight: 224 lb (102 kg)

Career information
- High school: Randolph-Henry (Charlotte Court House)
- College: Virginia (2016–2019)
- NFL draft: 2020: 5th round, 151st overall pick

Career history
- Los Angeles Chargers (2020–2022); Chicago Bears (2023)*
- * Offseason or practice squad member only

Awards and highlights
- Jet Award (2019); First-team All-American (2019); First-team All-ACC (2019); Third-team All-ACC (2018)

Career NFL statistics
- Rushing yards: 29
- Return yards: 435
- Total touchdowns: 1
- Stats at Pro Football Reference

Joseph William Reed (born January 4, 1998) is an American former professional football wide receiver and return specialist. He played college football for the Virginia Cavaliers, earning first-team All-American honors in 2019.

== Early life ==
Reed grew up in Charlotte Court House, Virginia and attended Randolph-Henry High School. He played high school football. He played running back as a freshman and moved to wide receiver before his sophomore year. He finished his sophomore season with 33 receptions for 900 yards and 21 total touchdowns and had 15 touchdown receptions as a junior. Reed moved from wide receiver to quarterback for his senior season and rushed for 2,100 yards and 38 touchdowns.

== College career ==
As a freshman, Reed served as the Cavaliers' primary kick returner and returned 28 kicks for 678 yards total (25.1 average). As a sophomore, he returned 29 kicks for 861 yards with two touchdowns and caught 23 passes for 244 yards and two touchdowns while also rushing for one touchdown and was named honorable mention All-Atlantic Coast Conference (ACC) as a return specialist. Reed was named third-team All-ACC after finishing his junior season with 25 receptions for 465 yards and seven touchdowns and 707 yards and a touchdown on 26 kickoff returns. As a senior, Reed returned 24 kickoffs for 796 yards (33.2 yards per return) and two touchdowns and was named first-team All-ACC as an all-purpose performer and as a return specialist, as well as a first-team All-American by the Walter Camp Foundation and the Football Writers Association of America and won the Jet Award as the nation's top return specialist. Reed also led Virginia with 77 receptions for 679 yards and seven touchdowns.

== Professional career ==
Pre-draft measurables
Height	Weight	Arm length	Hand span	Wingspan	40-yard dash	10-yard split	20-yard split	Vertical jump	Broad jump	Bench press
6 ft 0 1/2 in (1.84 m)	224 lb (102 kg)	31 1/8 in (0.79 m)	9 3/4 in (0.25 m)	6 ft 3 3/8 in (1.91 m)	4.47 s	1.55 s	2.65 s	38.0 in (0.97 m)	10 ft 3 in (3.12 m)	21 reps
All values from NFL Combine

=== Los Angeles Chargers ===
Reed was selected by the Los Angeles Chargers with the 151st overall pick in the fifth round of the 2020 NFL draft. He scored his first professional touchdown on a seven-yard rush against the Jacksonville Jaguars in Week 7.

On August 31, 2021, Reed was waived by the Chargers and re-signed to the practice squad the next day. He signed a reserve/future contract with the Chargers on January 18, 2022.

On August 30, 2022, Reed was waived by the Chargers and signed to the practice squad the next day.

=== Chicago Bears ===
On January 19, 2023, Reed signed a reserve/future contract with the Chicago Bears. He was waived/injured on August 26, 2023.
