= On the Hill =

On the Hill may refer to:

- On the Hill (TV program), a Canadian TV program
- On the Hill (Boydton, Virginia), a historic house in Boydton, Virginia
