= Mecklenburg County Courthouse =

Mecklenburg County Courthouse may refer to:

- Mecklenburg County Courthouse (North Carolina), listed on the National Register of Historic Places (NRHP)
- Mecklenburg County Courthouse (Virginia), listed on the NRHP in Mecklenburg County, Virginia
