= Wyche, Virginia =

Unincorporated community in Virginia, United States

- Unincorporated community
- Location within Virginia Location within the United States
- Coordinates: 36°37′34″N 77°47′43″W
- Country: United States
- State: Virginia
- County: Brunswick
- Elevation: 302 ft (92 m)
- Time zone: UTC-5 (Eastern (EST))
  - Summer (DST): UTC-4 (EDT)
- Area code: 276
- GNIS feature ID: 1500076

Wyche is an unincorporated community located in Brunswick County, in the U.S. state of Virginia.

== The Wyche family of Virginia ==
=== Whych family: earliest reference ===
In October 1689, Henry Wyche (the elder) apparently having been born in England, was in a court session in Surry County where the "importation" of 95 acres from "Henry Wyche" to a Robert Owens was recorded.
"The elder Henry also left a will in Surry Co., Virginia, dated 1 August 1712 and proved 18 March 1714. In it he mentions his children Aillinor (Eleanor), William, George, Sarah, Henry and James.". The junior Henry proceeded to acquire land and on June 22, 1722 he received a patent for 370 acres on the north side of the Meherrin River.
By approximately 1735, the Wyche family of Virginia owned approximately 590 acres of land, held as of 1735 by Henry Wyche, stating among other things: "Will of Henry Wyche of Brunswick County.. The land I now live on being in two surveys containing 590 acres to my son Henry Wyche, excepting that my loving wife Frances is to have the use of the plantation during her widowhood.."

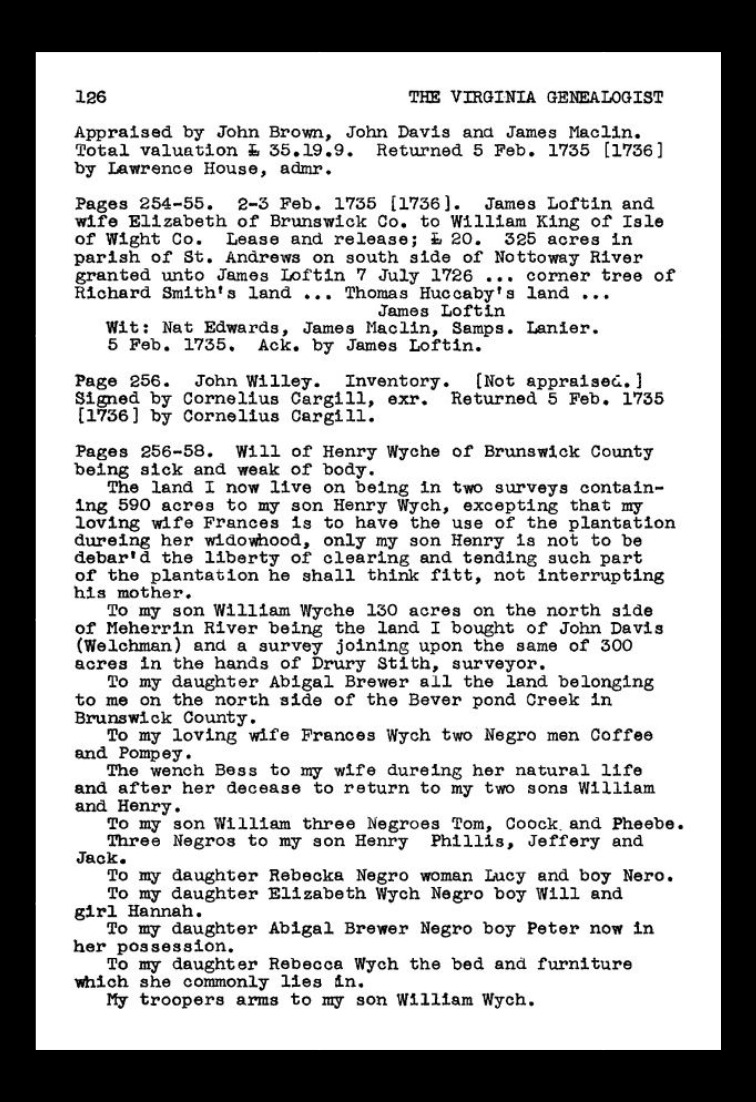
Will of Henry Wyche 1735 page 126

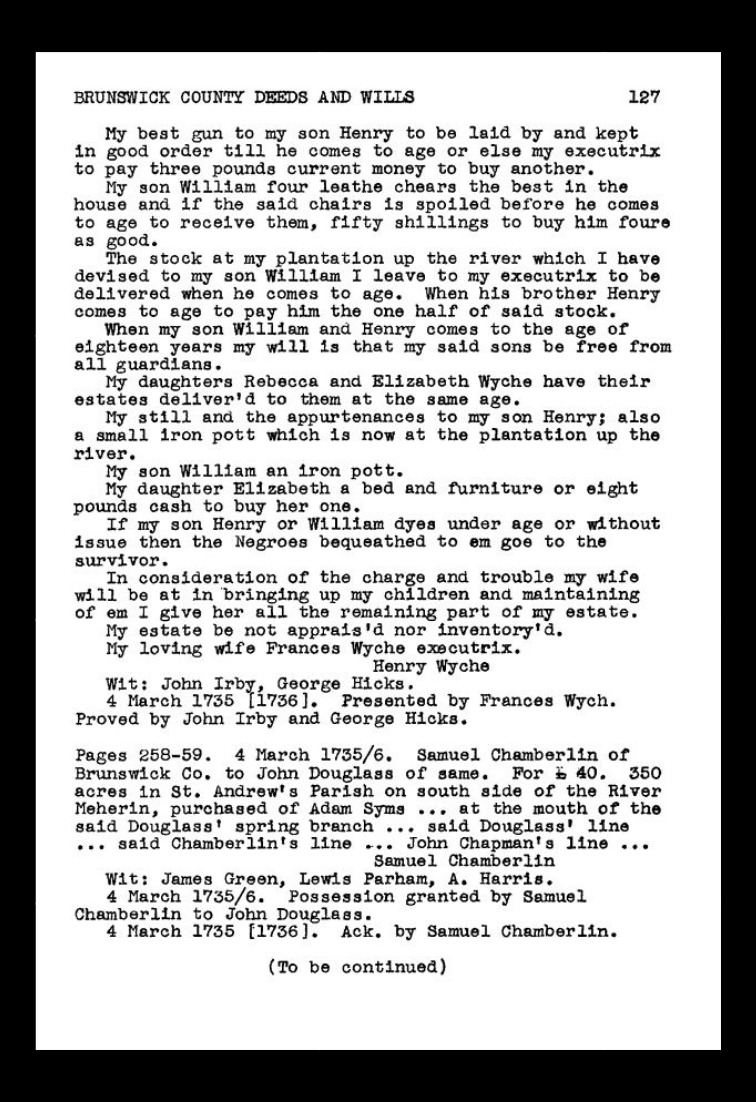
Will of Henry Wyche (continued) page 127

The will by Henry Wyche (d. 1737) continues in describing his estate, including "two Negro men Coffee and Pompey", "the wench Bess", "three Negros Tom, Coock and Pheebe", "Three Negros .. Phillis, Jeffery and Jack", "Negro boy Will and girl Hannah", "Negro boy Peter", followed by division of land to minor children, "iron Pott", a "house", and other items and stock. No inventory is presented in the will.
The will by Henry Wyche, dated 4 March 1735 [1736] was presented by "Frances Wych". Henry Wyche died on April 7, 1737.

=== Wyche name - etymology ===
"From Middle English wich, a variant of wik, the commonest sense of which was ‘dairy farm’, probably an occupational name for someone who worked at a wich, or a habitational name from any of the places so called."
Similar names include Wyche, Wick, Weech, Wice.
Domain: English, specifically Lancashire and Cheshire.
