= On the Hill (Boydton, Virginia) =

Historic house in Virginia, United States

- U.S. National Register of Historic Places
- U.S. Historic district – Contributing property
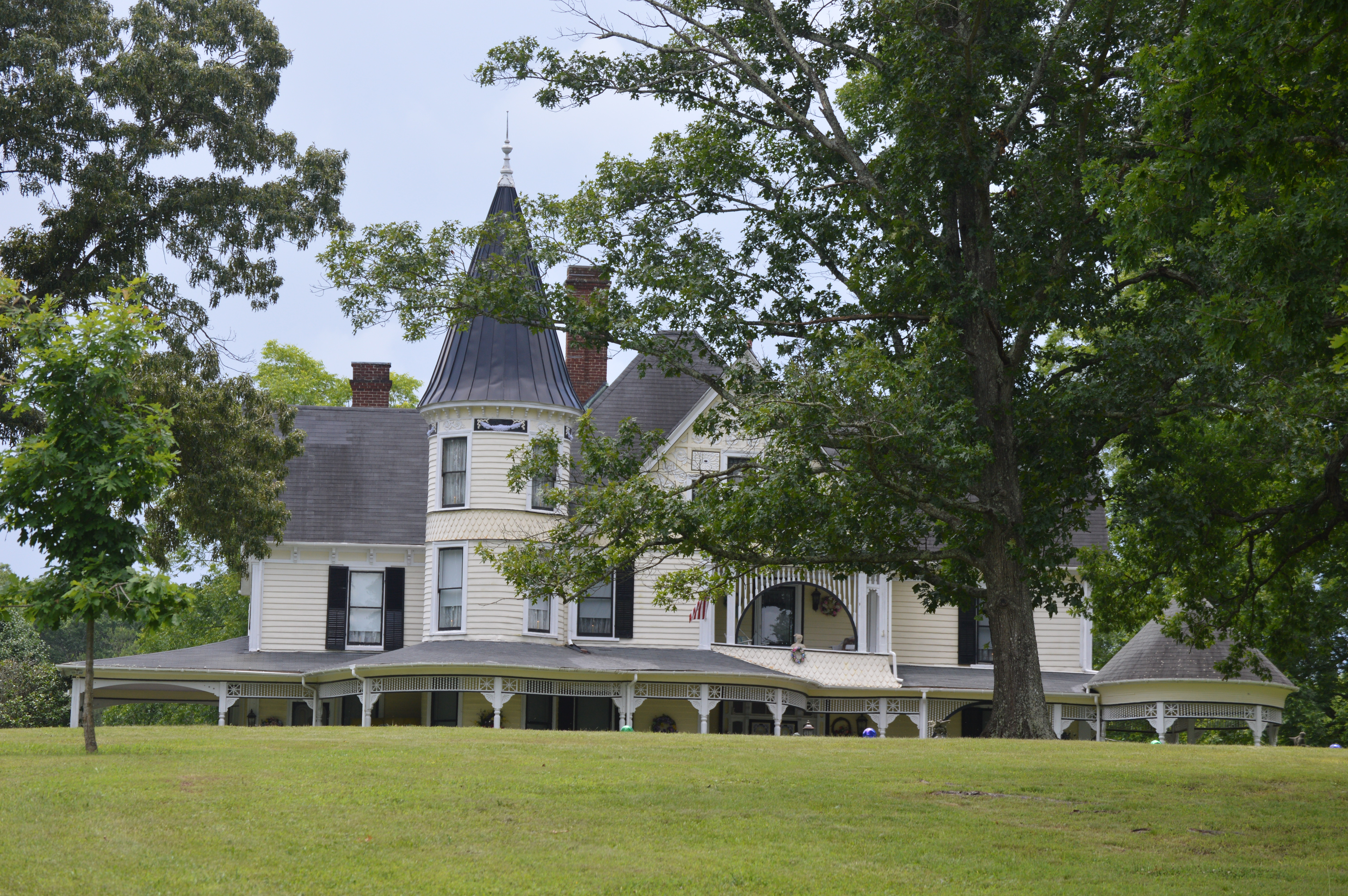
- Street view

- Location within Virginia Location within the United States
- Location: 982 Jefferson St., Boydton, Virginia
- Coordinates: 36°39′56″N 78°23′37″W
- Architect: Jacob W. Holt
- Architectural style: Federal; Queen Anne
- Part of: Boydton Historic District (ID02000511)
- NRHP reference No.: 13001164

Significant dates
- Added to NRHP: February 5, 2014
- Designated CP: May 16, 2002

On the Hill is an historic house at 982 Jefferson Street in Boydton, Virginia. The oldest portions of the house were built as a farmhouse in the early 19th century. In the late 19th century the Finch family hired a prominent local contractor, Jacob Holt, to transform the house into an elaborate Queen Anne residence. It has a three-story turret, and a porch that extends across the whole width of the house. The porch is decorated with bracketed eaves, and the house's main gable is decorated with carved woodwork.

The house was listed on the National Register of Historic Places in 2014; it is also a contributing element of the Boydton Historic District.

== See also ==
- National Register of Historic Places listings in Mecklenburg County, Virginia
