= Michael Hawkes =

American football player (born 1977)

No. 59
- Position: Linebacker

Personal information
- Born: April 11, 1977 (age 49); Richmond, Virginia, U.S.
- Listed height: 6 ft 0 in (1.83 m)
- Listed weight: 242 lb (110 kg)

Career information
- High school: Nottoway (Nottoway County, Virginia)
- College: Virginia Tech
- NFL draft: 2000: undrafted

Career history
- Carolina Panthers (2000–2001); St. Louis Rams (2002)*; → Scottish Claymores (2002); Dallas Cowboys (2003)*
- * Offseason or practice squad member only

Awards and highlights
- Second-team All-Big East (1999)

Career NFL statistics
- Games played: 3
- Stats at Pro Football Reference

Michael Tranzo Hawkes (born April 11, 1977) is an American former professionall football linebacker who played in the National Football League (NFL) for the Carolina Panthers. He played college football at Virginia Tech. He also played for the Scottish Claymores in the World League of American Football (WLAF).

== Early life ==
Hawkes attended Nottoway High School in Nottoway County, Virginia. As a senior, he was a starter at linebacker, receiving region and district Defensive Player of the Year honors. He also was named All-Group AA at tight end.

He accepted a football scholarship from Virginia Tech. As a redshirt freshman, he made 4 tackles. As a sophomore, he had 20 tackles. As a junior, he started 11 games, posting 79 tackles, 5.5 sacks and 3 interceptions.

As a senior, he started every game, registering 69 tackles, 3 sacks and 2 interceptions, while contributing to the team reaching the National Championship Game in the 2000 Sugar Bowl.

== Professional career ==
=== Carolina Panthers ===
Hawkes was signed as an undrafted free agent by the Carolina Panthers after the 2000 NFL draft on April 26. He was waived before the start of the season and signed to the practice squad, where he remained for the first 15 weeks. On December 19, he was promoted to the active roster. He played in the season finale against the Oakland Raiders.

In 2001, he was cut before the start of the season and signed to the practice squad on September 4. On October 12, he was promoted to the active roster. He played in 2 games before being released on October 24, to make room for linebacker Darren Hambrick.

=== St. Louis Rams ===
On January 19, 2002, he was signed by the St. Louis Rams. On February 12, he was allocated to the Scottish Claymores of the World League of American Football. He was named the starter at middle linebacker for the Claymores, while recording 10 starts, 43 tackles (second on the team), one sack, 3 passes defensed and one fumble recovery. He was released by the Rams before the start of the season.

=== Dallas Cowboys ===
On January 7, 2003, he was signed as a free agent by the Dallas Cowboys. He was released on August 31.
