= James Pittillo =

James Pittillo (b. 1690–1698 Scotland – d. 1754 Dinwiddie County, Virginia) was a Scots laborer and Jacobite rebel, who became a major landowner after being deported in 1716 to the Colony of Virginia. After completing service of his indenture, in 1726 Pittillo was granted 242 acres (1.0 km^{2}) on Waqua Creek in Brunswick County, Virginia.

Appointed as a tobacco inspector in Bristol Parish in 1728, that year he was also selected for the major expedition of William Byrd II to survey the border between Virginia and North Carolina. Through grants of headrights and purchases, Pittillo eventually acquired more than 4,000 acres (16 km^{2}) in the area of what developed as Prince George, Brunswick, and Dinwiddie counties in Southside Virginia.

== Biography ==
James Pittillo was born between 1690 and 1698 in Scotland, likely in Perthshire. According to records in the British Archives of persons captured in the Jacobite rising of 1715 and deported to the colonies, James Pittillo was a laborer from the parish of Logierait in the ancient county of Perthshire (or Perth). Pittillo was captured at the Battle of Preston, tried, and transported on the ship Elizabeth and Anne to Virginia in June/July 1716.

James settled in Bristol Parish, Prince George County. This was part of what became known as Southside Virginia. His name first appeared in colonial Virginia records in February 1723/24 when he witnessed the will of Richard Smith. In April 1724, Pittillo was recorded as surveying 200 acres (0.8 km^{2}) on the north side of Moccosoneck (presently called Rowanty) Creek in Prince George County, Virginia.

In October 1726, having served his indenture to pay for the costs of his transportation to the colony, Pittillo was granted 242 acres (1.0 km^{2}) on Waqua Creek in what was now Brunswick County. (The county was formed in 1720, partly from land previously assigned to Prince George County.) In 1734, Pittillo received a grant for 844 acres (3.4 km^{2}) on both sides of White Oak Swamp of Rowanty. In 1735, he was granted 252 acres (1.0 km^{2}) on Sturgeon Run, land which he sold in 1742.

In 1745–6, Pittillo received grants for more than 2,500 acres (10.1 km^{2}) on Stony and Moccosoneck creeks in Prince George County, Virginia. It is likely these grants were for headrights for persons Pittillo paid to bring to the colonies, such as indentured servants and African slaves. In this period of development, the Crown granted 240 acres (1.0 km^{2}) in headrights for each person whom an individual brought to the colony, as it wanted to develop the pool of workers and increase agricultural productivity.

In all, through land grants and purchases, Pittillo acquired more than 4,000 acres (16 km^{2}) in the area of Prince George County, Brunswick, and Dinwiddie counties in Southside Virginia. His largest land holdings were on the north side of Moccosoneck Creek. This area south of present-day Petersburg, Virginia was originally in Prince George County, but it was assigned to Dinwiddie County when it was organized in 1752. With so much land to be worked, he likely also had acquired numerous British indentured servants and African slaves as laborers. By the mid-18th century, planters were having to rely more on purchase of slaves, as economic conditions had improved in England and fewer workers wanted to emigrate to the colonies.

In 1728, William Byrd II was commissioned to survey the boundary line between the colonies of Virginia and North Carolina. He assembled an expeditionary force of about twenty men, including Pittillo, whom he considered expert woodsmen and Indian traders. They set out on 5 March 1728. After six weeks, the survey work was halted. They renewed the expedition in September when the weather was cooler. Byrd listed James Pittillo as part of both his spring and fall expeditions.

In 1728, James Pittillo was appointed as a tobacco inspector in Bristol Parish. Tobacco was the important commodity crop of Virginia at the time; his position gave him influence in the parish, as he determined prices to be gained by planters.

James Pittillo died about 1754 in Dinwiddie County, Virginia. His wife, Mary, and several children survived him.

== Family of James and Mary Pittillo of Prince George County, Virginia ==
1. James Pittillo was born 25 December 1725 in Bristol Parish, Prince George County, Virginia. He married Martha Burge about 1745. He died about 1782 in Brunswick County, Virginia. His widow, Martha, and oldest son James were shown on the 1788 Brunswick County Tax List.

2. Ann Pittillo was born 15 July 1728 in Bristol Parish, Prince George County, Virginia. She married James Williams and they made their home in Lunenburg County, Virginia.

3. Henry Pittillo was born 31 October 1730 in Bristol Parish, Prince George County, Virginia. This man was not the Rev. Henry Pattillo (later of North Carolina), known as a Presbyterian minister and teacher.

4. Mary Pittillo was born about 1732. She was not married at the time of her father's will.

5. Lucy S. Pittillo was born 11 November 1733 in Bristol Parish, Prince George County, Virginia. She may have married James Moses.

6. John Pittillo was born about 1734 in Bristol Parish, Prince George County, Virginia. His first wife was probably a Millington. His second wife was Rachel (surname unknown). John Pittillo died 10 April 1827 in Burke County, North Carolina.
