= Brunswick Correctional Center =

Prison in Virginia, United States

Coordinates: 36.776690°N 77.821899°W

Brunswick Correctional Center was a prison of the Virginia Department of Corrections in unincorporated Brunswick County, Virginia, near Lawrenceville.

== Closing ==
The prison, which once had 700-800 employees, had about 328.5 [sic] employees in 2009. As a part of the budget cut program from Governor of Virginia Tim Kaine, it was scheduled to close on October 10, 2009, with the state believing it would per year save the state government $10,400,000. The state planned to end 164 full-time job positions. The closing harmed economic prospects of the people around the area as the community did not have many other jobs. Frank Ruff, a member of the Virginia Senate; the county administrator, Charlette T. Wooldridge; and the county sheriff both criticized the closure.

The state offered the property for sale and decreased the price, from $30 million to $10 million by 2015, when potential owners failed to materialize. That year the Virginia General Assembly approved a motion for the corrections department to demolish vacant buildings.

== Notable inmates ==
- Jens Söring
