= Boydton Historic District =

Historic district in Virginia, United States

- U.S. National Register of Historic Places
- U.S. Historic district
- Virginia Landmarks Register
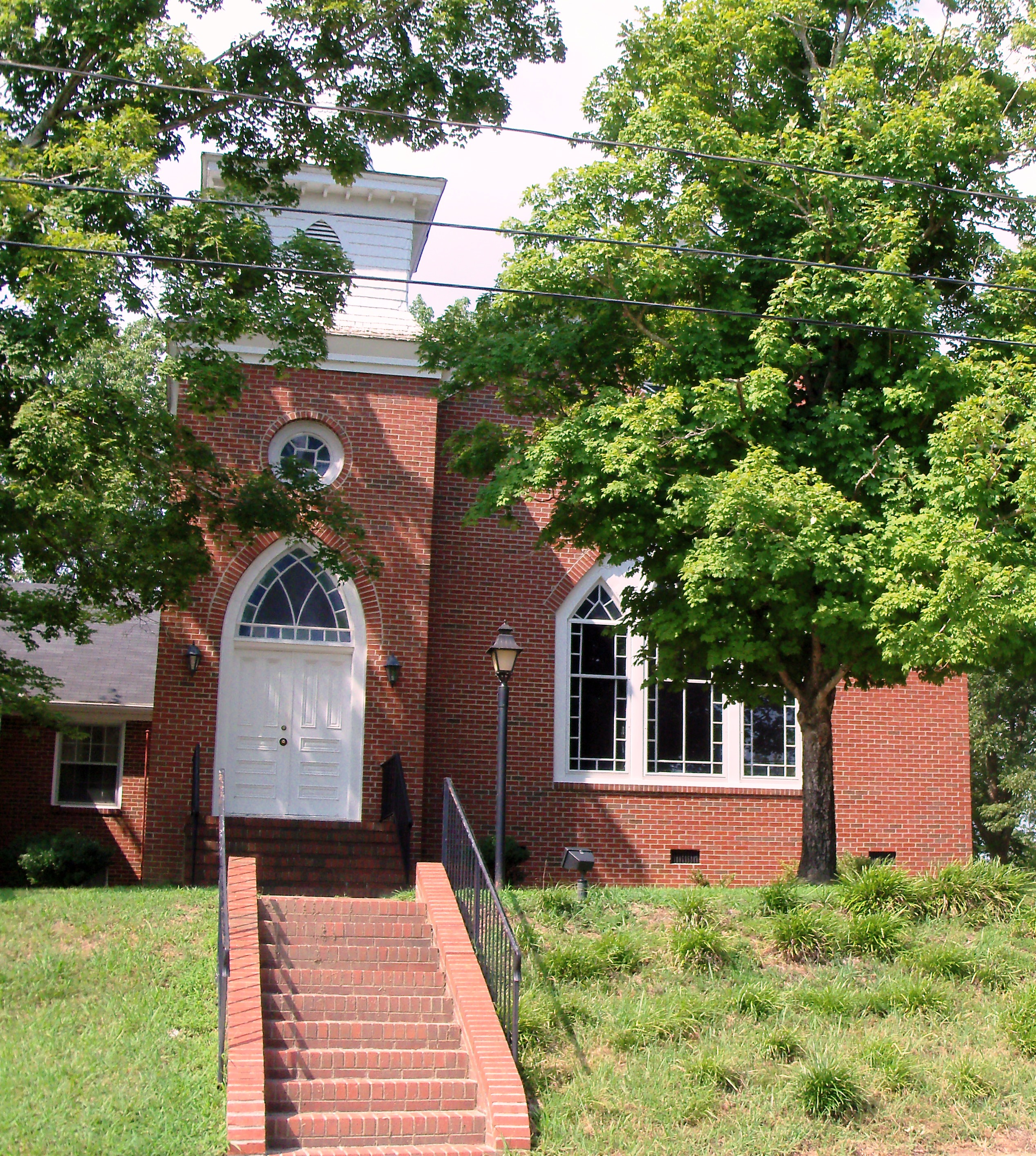
- Boydton Baptist Church

- Location within Virginia Location within the United States
- Location: Roughly the Boydton corporate limits except for section including and NW of VA 58, Boydton, Virginia
- Coordinates: 36°39′59″N 78°23′22″W
- Area: 254 acres (103 ha)
- Built: 1764
- Architect: Mills, Matthew; et al.
- Architectural style: Early Republic, Mid 19th Century Revival
- NRHP reference No.: 02000511
- VLR No.: 173-5001

Significant dates
- Added to NRHP: May 16, 2002
- Designated VLR: March 14, 2001

The Boydton Historic District is a national historic district located at Boydton, Mecklenburg County, Virginia. It encompasses 199 contributing buildings, 6 contributing sites, 6 contributing structure, and 2 contributing objects in the central business district and surrounding residential areas of the town of Boydton. Notable buildings include the municipal building (1905), the old jail (1870), the Beales, Bedinger, and Gregory, Inc. car dealership building (1918), Washington Tavern, Williams and Goode Bank (1908), Abraham Fine's Boydton Department Store (1910-1931, reconstructed 1935), Mecklenburg County Building Department (1949), Southside Regional Library (1939), Presbyterian Meeting House (1819), Saint James Episcopal Church (1840-1841), Boydton Baptist Church, Trinity Episcopal Church (1890s), "Cedar Crest" (1825), and "On the Hill" (1920), which was separately listed in 2015. Also located in the district and separately listed are the Boyd's Tavern and Mecklenburg County Courthouse.

It was listed on the National Register of Historic Places in 2002.
