= Ante, Virginia =

Unincorporated community in Virginia, United States

Coordinates: 36°39′54″N 77°43′09″W

Ante is an unincorporated community located in Brunswick County, in the U.S. state of Virginia.
