= John McCargo =

American football player (born 1983)

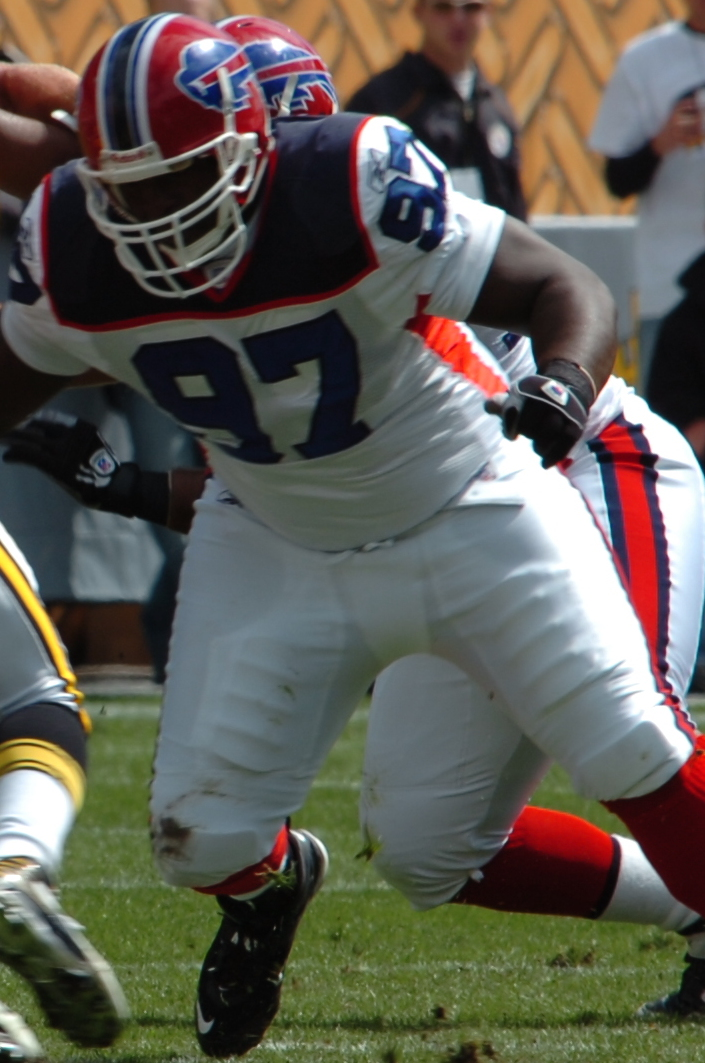
- McCargo with the Buffalo Bills in 2007

No. 97, 95, 79
- Position: Defensive tackle

Personal information
- Born: August 19, 1983 (age 43); Drakes Branch, Virginia, U.S.
- Listed height: 6 ft 2 in (1.88 m)
- Listed weight: 307 lb (139 kg)

Career information
- High school: Randolph-Henry (Charlotte Court House, Virginia)
- College: NC State (2002–2005)
- NFL draft: 2006: 1st round, 26th overall pick

Career history
- Buffalo Bills (2006–2010); Tampa Bay Buccaneers (2011); Chicago Bears (2012)*
- * Offseason or practice squad member only

Awards and highlights
- Freshman All-American (2003)

Career NFL statistics
- Total tackles: 52
- Sacks: 2.5
- Forced fumbles: 1
- Fumble recoveries: 1
- Stats at Pro Football Reference

John McCargo (born August 19, 1983) is an American former professional football player who was a defensive tackle in the National Football League (NFL). He was selected by the Buffalo Bills in the first round of the 2006 NFL draft. He played college football for the NC State Wolfpack. McCargo was also a member of the Tampa Bay Buccaneers and Chicago Bears.

== College career ==
McCargo attended and played college football at NC State. He was a three-year starter for the Wolfpack.

== Professional career ==
Pre-draft measurables
Height	Weight	Arm length	Hand span	40-yard dash	10-yard split	20-yard split	20-yard shuttle	Three-cone drill	Vertical jump	Broad jump	Bench press
6 ft 1 1/2 in (1.87 m)	302 lb (137 kg)	32 1/2 in (0.83 m)	10 1/8 in (0.26 m)	5.16 s	1.75 s	2.96 s	4.48 s	7.79 s	30.5 in (0.77 m)	9 ft 2 in (2.79 m)	25 reps
All values from NFL Combine

=== Buffalo Bills ===
Many draft experts considered McCargo a late-2nd or early-3rd round pick before the 2006 NFL draft. Because of this, many people were shocked when the Bills traded up to select him in the first round with the 26th overall selection.

McCargo spent most of the 2006 season on injured reserve. He played in five games as a rookie. He was the second string defensive tackle behind Larry Tripplett in 2007, and played in all 16 games.

On October 14, 2008, McCargo was traded to the Indianapolis Colts for an undisclosed draft pick, having been beaten out in the depth chart by Kyle Williams. However, after failing his physical the following day, the trade was voided and McCargo was returned to the Bills. He played in seven games in the 2008 season. In the 2009 season, he appeared in 11 games and made one start, which came in Week 10 against the Tennessee Titans. In the 2010 season, McCargo only appeared in one game, Week 13 against the Minnesota Vikings.

=== Tampa Bay Buccaneers ===
McCargo signed with the Tampa Bay Buccaneers on August 20, 2011. He was waived on September 2 but was re-signed the next day.

On November 8, 2011, the Buccaneers re-signed McCargo to fill a roster void caused by a season-ending injury to Gerald McCoy. McCargo was again cut the next day after the Buccaneers signed Albert Haynesworth.

A week later McCargo was once-again re-signed, following a season-ending knee injury to George Johnson. On May 2, 2012, the Buccaneers again released McCargo.

=== Chicago Bears ===
McCargo signed with the Chicago Bears on May 10, 2012.

On August 26, 2012, the Bears waived McCargo.

== Personal life ==
In October 2017, McCargo was arrested on gun and drug charges in Virginia. There had also been a warrant out for his arrest after domestic violence charges were brought against him in California.
