= Boyd's Tavern (Mecklenburg County, Virginia) =

Historic commercial building in Virginia, United States

- U.S. National Register of Historic Places
- U.S. Historic district – Contributing property
- Virginia Landmarks Register
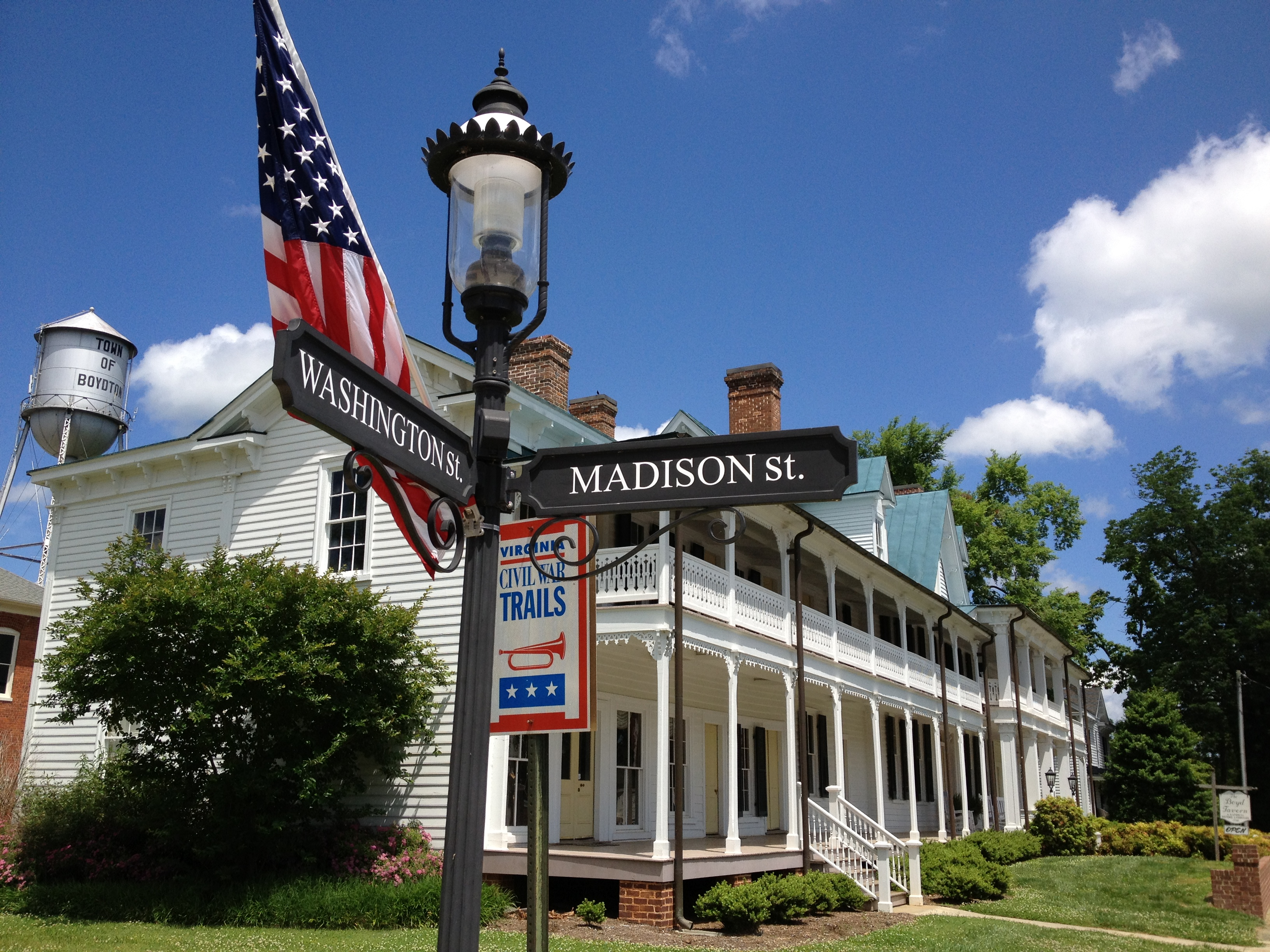

- Location within Virginia Location within the United States
- Location: Washington St., Boydton, Virginia
- Coordinates: 36°40′3″N 78°23′18″W
- Area: less than one acre
- Built: c. 1800
- Built by: Holt, Jacob
- NRHP reference No.: 76002113
- VLR No.: 173-0001

Significant dates
- Added to NRHP: September 29, 1976
- Designated VLR: February 17, 1976

Boyd's Tavern, also known as Boyd Tavern, Exchange Hotel, and Boydton Hotel, is a historic inn and tavern located at Boydton, Mecklenburg County, Virginia. It is a rambling two-story, frame structure built in at least three stages during the 19th century. The earliest section is the central section and it dates to about 1800. The front facade features a full-length two-story porch with sawn-work decoration.

It was listed on the National Register of Historic Places in 1976. It is located in the Boydton Historic District.
