= Prince Edward County High School =

Location
- 35 Eagle Drive; Farmville, Virginia 23901; United States
- Coordinates: 37°15′52.7″N 78°24′7.8″W

Information
- School type: Public high school
- School district: Prince Edward County Public Schools
- Principal: Jessica Tibbs
- Staff: Barbara A. Johnson
- Grades: 9–12
- Enrollment: 580 (2021-22)
- Language: English
- Colors: Purple, gold
- Athletics conference: Southside District; Region I
- Mascot: Eagle
- Rival: Nottoway County High School
- Newspaper: In Flight
- Feeder schools: Prince Edward County Middle School
- Website: Official site

Prince Edward County High School is a public high school located in the Farmville area of Prince Edward County, Virginia, United States. It is part of the Prince Edward County School Division, along with Prince Edward County Elementary School and Prince Edward County Middle School. Athletic teams compete in the Virginia High School League's AA Southside District in Region I.

== Historical significance ==
In 1951, the school, which was then called Moton High School, was all-black and very impoverished. On April 23, 1951, citing the inequities of the current school to the all-white school, Barbra Johns called to action the all-black student body to walk out and go on strike. At the time, white students attended public all-white schools.

Prince Edward County High School is known for the landmark cases Davis v. The Prince Edward County Board of Education and Griffin v. The Prince Edward County Board of Education. These two initial cases that challenged the concept of separate but equal doctrine, and championed by the NAACP, were decided for the defendant.

Davis v. The Prince Edward County Board of Education became one of five others forming the foundation of the landmark case Brown v. Board of Education.

By 1959, when the county schools were finally forced to integrate, Prince Edward County reacted by closing their public schools. The schools in Prince Edward County were closed from 1959 to 1964. This was the only county in the nation to close its public schools for an extended period to avoid desegregation.

Moton High School remained closed for several years, and black students who wanted an education were forced out of the county. In 1993, the building that formerly housed Moton High School was closed, but the school was declared a National Historic Landmark in 1998. The Moton School has now been turned into a museum commemorating the fight for civil rights in public education and features a permanent exhibit called “The Moton School Story: Children of Courage.”

Moton High was eventually reopened as Prince Edward High School and later renamed Prince Edward County High School.
