= Amelia County High School =

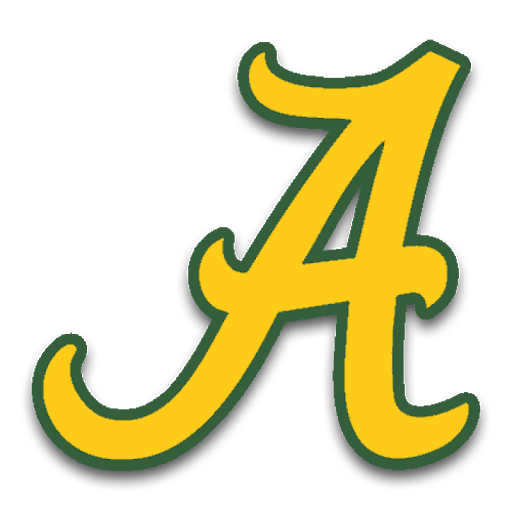

Location
- 8500 Otterburn Road; Amelia, Virginia 23002; United States
- Coordinates: 37°19′51.9″N 77°59′15.7″W

Information
- School type: Public, high school
- Motto: Exemplary Citizenship - Forward Thinking - Future Ready
- School district: Amelia County Public Schools
- Superintendent: Lori Harper
- Principal: Jennifer Ramey
- Grades: 9–12
- Enrollment: 538 (2022-23)
  - Grade 9: 165
  - Grade 10: 147
  - Grade 11: 122
  - Grade 12: 104
- Language: American English
- Campus: Rural
- Colors: Kelly Green & Gold
- Athletics conference: Virginia High School League; James River District [2A - James River]
- Mascot: Raider (Medieval Soldier)
- Rival: Buckingham High School
- Feeder schools: Amelia County Middle School
- Website: hs.amelia.k12.va.us

Amelia County High School (ACHS), part of the Amelia County Public Schools system, is a public high school located in Amelia Courthouse, Virginia, United States. ACHS serves over 500 students grades 9–12 to citizens within Amelia County.

== History ==
In the 1960s, the school was formed with the combination of the all white Amelia High School and the all African American Russell Grove High School. In addition to a new name, there was a new school song, new colors - green and gold - and a new mascot, The Raider.

== Academics ==
ACHS ranks among the top 8,200 high schools in America, 180th in Virginia, and 23rd in the Richmond Metro Area. 17% of students take part in Advanced Placement classes. The graduation rate is 98%.

== Athletics ==
With an enrollment of roughly 578 as of 2016–2017, Amelia County High School plays in Group A of the Virginia High School League. The mascot for this high school is a raider and the school colors are green and gold. The raider is a medieval soldier, wearing armor and carrying a shield and javelin while riding a horse. The school is part of the James River District in Southside Virginia.

== Accountability ==
Amelia County High School is fully accredited. This means that school meets "the commonwealth's expectations for student learning in English, mathematics, and history/social science." A school can earn this accreditation based on its students test results and graduation rates.

== Notable alumni ==
- Monte Kennedy, former MLB player (New York Giants)
