= Red Fox Farm =

Historic house in Virginia, United States

- U.S. National Register of Historic Places
- Virginia Landmarks Register
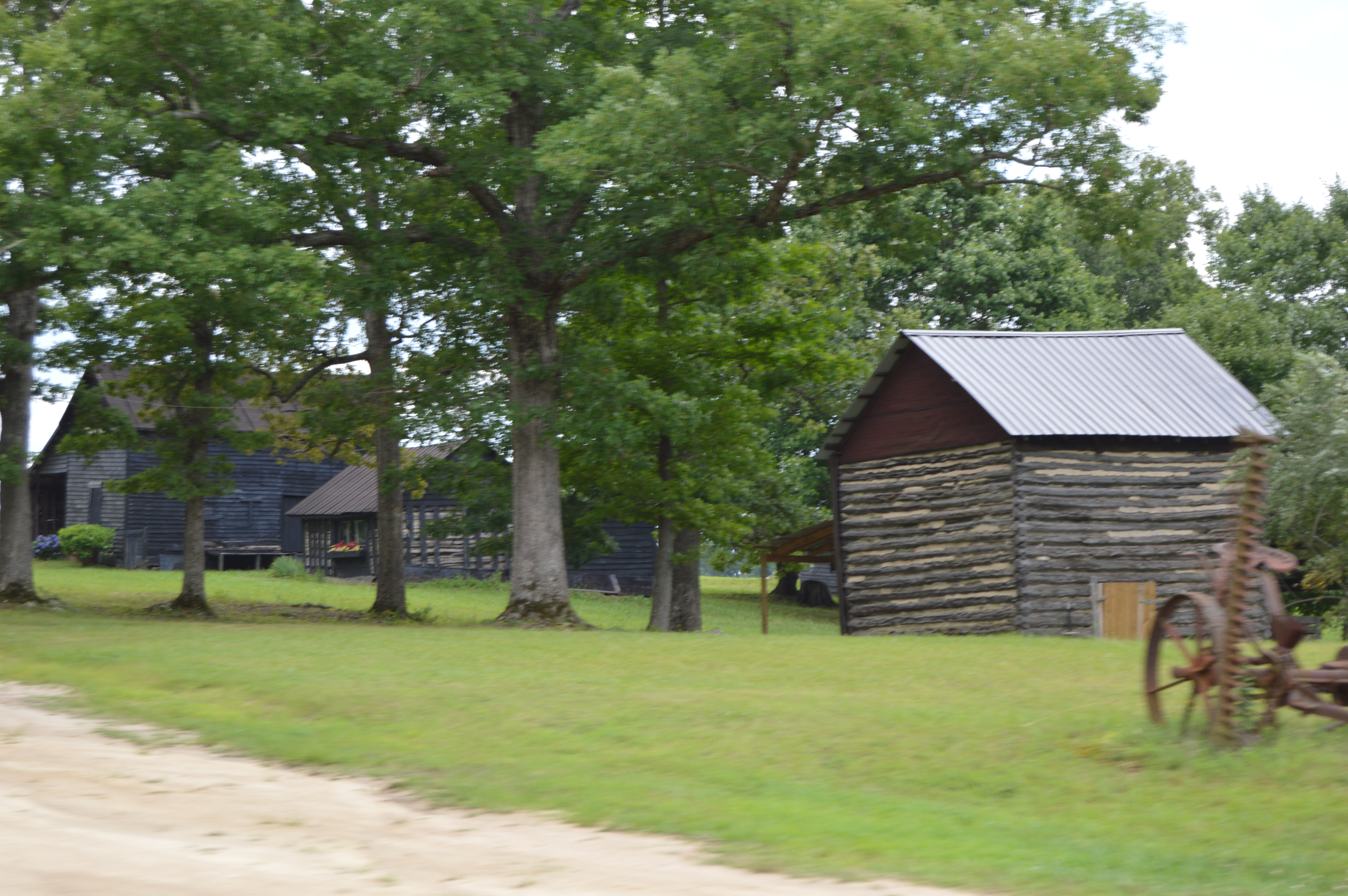
- Log barns

- Location within Virginia Location within the United States
- Location: VA 688 E side, 0.7 mi. S of jct. with VA 695, near Skipwith, Virginia
- Coordinates: 36°42′54″N 78°29′11″W
- Area: 230 acres (93 ha)
- NRHP reference No.: 93000508
- VLR No.: 058-0131

Significant dates
- Added to NRHP: June 10, 1993
- Designated VLR: April 21, 1993

Red Fox Farm is a historic home and tobacco farm located near Skipwith, Mecklenburg County, Virginia. The house dates to the late-19th century, and is a one-story, two-room-plan frame structure with gable roof. Also on the property are the contributing five log tobacco barns, a frame pack house, a log strip house, a log cabin, a smokehouse, a corn crib, and a commissary.

It was listed on the National Register of Historic Places in 1993.
