= Franklin High School (Virginia) =

- Front of Franklin High School, 2026

Location
- 310 Crescent Drive; Franklin, Virginia 23851; United States; 36°41′29″N 76°56′52″W

Information
- Type: Public Secondary school
- Motto: Go Broncos, and Lead the Stampede!
- Established: 1967
- School district: Franklin City Public Schools
- Principal: Earling Hunter
- Grades: 7-12
- Gender: Co-Ed
- Enrollment: 293 (2016-17)
- Colors: Navy Blue, Gold
- Nickname: Broncos
- Rivals: Southampton High School
- Website: Official website

Franklin High School is a public high school in Franklin, Virginia. It is a co-educational school serving grades 7-12. Franklin High School is a member of the Tri-Rivers District, Class A athletic conference. Franklin High School is part of the Franklin City Public Schools District.

== History ==
In 1990, the school was one of 15 high schools nationally to be honored by the White House for its efforts to reduce or eliminate teen tobacco and drug usage. As part of the honor, FHS principal, Sam Jones, went to the White House to meet the president.

Up until 2003, the school's senior class had a tradition of writing goodbye messages and college information on a barn across from FHS. The "Senior Wall" came down, with the assistance of FHS alumni, in December 2003.

== Athletics ==
Franklin High School is a member of the Tri-Rivers District, Class A athletic conference. The following sports are offered:

- Football
- Volleyball
- Golf
- Basketball (boys and girls)
- Wrestling
- Baseball
- Softball
- Tennis (boys and girls)
- Cross country
- Track
- Soccer (boys and girls)

=== State championships ===
In the year 2004, the school's varsity football team won the state championship over J.I. Burton High School. In 2008 the Broncos won their second State Championship in four years against Clintwood 28-20. in total franklin high has 6 state champions as a school in football, basketball, volleyball, and gymnastics started in the 1980s
