= Maurice Anderson (American football) =

American football player (born 1975)

No. 78, 75
- Position: Defensive tackle

Personal information
- Born: January 19, 1975 (age 51); Nottoway County, Virginia, U.S.
- Listed height: 6 ft 3 in (1.91 m)
- Listed weight: 296 lb (134 kg)

Career information
- High school: Nottoway
- College: Virginia

Career history
- New England Patriots (2000)*; New York Jets (2000); New England Patriots (2001–2002)*; Miami Dolphins (2003)*; Amsterdam Admirals (2003); Colorado Crush (2005); Los Angeles Avengers (2006)
- * Offseason or practice squad member only

Awards and highlights
- Super Bowl champion (XXXVI); ArenaBowl champion (2005)
- Stats at ArenaFan.com

Maurice Anderson (born January 19, 1975) is an American former professional football player. He played college football at the University of Virginia. He was also a member of the New York Jets, New England Patriots and Miami Dolphins of the National Football League (NFL), the Amsterdam Admirals of NFL Europe, and the Colorado Crush and Los Angeles Avengers of the Arena Football League (AFL). He was a member of the Patriots team that won Super Bowl XXXVI.

== Early life ==
Anderson played defensive end at Nottoway High School in Nottoway County, Virginia and was named all-state and all-region in his junior and senior years.

== College career ==
Anderson was a four-year letterman for the Virginia Cavaliers of the University of Virginia. He finished his career with 106 tackles and five sacks.

== Professional career ==
Anderson was signed by the New England Patriots as a rookie free agent on April 25, 2000. He was released by the Patriots on August 28, 2000.

Anderson was claimed off waivers by the New York Jets on August 29, 2000. He was re-signed to a one-year deal by the Jets on March 27, 2001. He was released by the Jets on September 3, 2001.

Anderson was signed to the Patriots practice squad on October 16, 2001. He was re-signed on February 11, 2002. He was released by the Patriots on September 1, 2002 and signed to the Patriots' practice squad on September 3. Anderson was on the practice squad when the Patriots won Super Bowl XXXVI.

Anderson was signed by the Miami Dolphins on January 28, 2003. He was allocated to NFL Europe by the Miami Dolphins on January 31, 2003. He played for the Amsterdam Admirals. He was released by the Dolphins on August 29, 2003.

Anderson spent the 2005 season with the Colorado Crush.

Anderson spent the 2006 season with the Los Angeles Avengers.
