= Amelia County Public Schools =

School district that serves Amelia County, Virginia

Address
- 8740 Otterburn Rd; Amelia Court House, VA 23002 Amelia County; United States

District information
- Type: Public, Rural
- Motto: EXEMPLARY CITIZENSHIP — FORWARD THINKING — FUTURE READY
- Grades: Pre-K-12
- Superintendent: Dr. Lori Harper
- Governing agency: Virginia Department of Education
- Schools: 3
- NCES District ID: 5100180

Students and staff
- Students: 1,761
- Teachers: 108.21
- Student–teacher ratio: 16.27
- Athletic conference: Virginia High School League; 2A James River District

Other information
- Website: Amelia County Public Schools

Amelia County Public Schools is a school district that serves Amelia County, Virginia in primary and secondary education. The district is headquartered in Amelia Courthouse. The district is led by superintendent is Dr. Lori Harper.

The school district became desegregated in the 1960s after the Brown v. Board of Education supreme court case.

== Schools ==
=== Elementary Schools (Pre-K-5) ===
- Amelia County Elementary School – Amelia Court House

=== Middle Schools (6-8) ===
- Amelia County Middle School – Amelia Courthouse

=== High Schools (9-12) ===
- Amelia County High School (Raiders) – Amelia Courthouse

=== Alternative Schools ===
- Amelia-Nottoway Technical Center – Jetersville

== Former Schools ==
- Russell Grove High School – Amelia Courthouse

The all-black Russell Grove High School merged with Amelia County High School in the 1960s.

== Finances ==
As of the 2016–2017 school year, the appraised valuation of property in the district was 19,834,000 as of 2016–2017.

== Demographics ==
Amelia County Public Schools Ethnic Data
Ethnicity	%
White	73%
Black	21%
Hispanic	3%
Asian	0.3%
Two or More Races	0.2%

== Transportation ==
ACPS Operates 36 different bus routes with a few routes that span into different counties.

== Other Activities ==
Amelia County High School competes in Class 2A of the James River District in the Virginia High School League.

== See also ==
- List of school divisions in Virginia
- List of high schools in Virginia
