= Dolphin, Virginia =

Unincorporated community in Virginia, US

Coordinates: 36°49′46″N 77°47′13″W

Dolphin is an unincorporated community located in Brunswick County, in the U.S. state of Virginia.
