= Bluestone High School =

Location
- 6825 Skipwith Road; Skipwith, Virginia 23968; United States
- Coordinates: 36°42′20.3″N 78°29′48.1″W

Information
- School type: Public high school
- Founded: 1955
- Closed: 2022
- School district: Mecklenburg County Public Schools
- Superintendent: Paul Nichols
- Principal: Magie Wilkerson
- Grades: 9–12
- Enrollment: 528 (2018-19)
- Language: English
- Colors: Blue, gold, and white
- Athletics conference: James River District; Region B
- Mascot: Barons
- Rival: Park View High School
- Website: mcpsweb.org?page_id=28897

Bluestone High School was a public high school in Skipwith, Virginia, in Mecklenburg County. It was part of the Mecklenburg County Public Schools and officially opened on September 12, 1955. It closed in 2022, consolidating with former rivals Park View High School to form the new Mecklenburg County High School. The athletic teams competed in the Virginia High School League's A James River District in Region B.

== Athletics ==
- Football
- Volleyball
- Golf
- Cross country
- Boys basketball
- Girls basketball
- Baseball
- Softball
- Boys soccer
- Girls soccer
- Track and field
- Wrestling

== Music department ==
- Marching band
- Concert band
- Colorguard

== Notable alumni ==
- Michael Tucker, Former MLB Player (Kansas City Royals, Atlanta Braves, Cincinnati Reds, Chicago Cubs, San Francisco Giants, Philadelphia Phillies, New York Mets
- Jerome Kersey, Former NBA Player (Portland Trail Blazers, Golden State Warriors, Los Angeles Lakers, Seattle SuperSonics, San Antonio Spurs, Milwaukee Bucks)
