= Southampton High School (Courtland, Virginia) =

Location
- 23350 Southampton Parkway; Courtland, Virginia 23837; United States; 36°42′3″N 77°6′23.7″W

Information
- School type: Public high school
- Founded: 1955; 1993 (current building)
- School district: Southampton County School Division
- Superintendent: Dr. Juliana Thompson
- Principal: Dr. Camilla C. Ferebee
- Grades: 9–12
- Enrollment: 704 (2026-27)
- Language: English
- Campus: Rural
- Colors: Red and white
- Athletics conference: Virginia High School League; Southside District; Region I
- Nickname: Indians
- Rival: Franklin High School
- Website: Official site

Southampton High School is a public high school located in Courtland, Virginia, United States, in Southampton County, west of Franklin and east of Emporia. It opened in 1955 at a new campus that consolidated four high schools. It is part of Southampton County Public Schools. The school's current facility opened in 1993.

== History ==
Southampton High School opened in the fall of 1955 at a new facility on Routes 35 and 58 in Southampton County, Virginia, two miles southwest of Courtland, Virginia. The new school consolidated the county's four public high schools, previously located in Boykins, Courtland, Ivor, and Newsoms. It had 332 students, 17 fulltime faculty, and two part-time faculty for its first year. Its first principal was Raymond C. Bodkin.

When the high school was constructed, it was intended to serve the white students of Southampton County, excluding those living in Franklin. In 1970, the school merged with Riverview High School, formerly the county's high school for Black students. This made it the only public high school for the Southampton County Public School district. This merger took place due to Brown v. Board of Education, which desegregated public schools in the United States. The school system's attempt to work around the merger was rejected by the U.S. 4th Circuit Court in June 1970.

During the 1970s, the high school won numerous AA state football championships, under the leadership of coach Wayne Cosby. Its first win was in 1973, following a perfect season. Between 1972 and 1980, Southampton's Indians had a record of 99–6, including a 69-game winning streak. They played in the AA state championship, winning four times.

Southampton High School moved into its current facility at 23350 Southampton Parkway in Courtland, Virginia in 1993. It is located in a rural setting.

== Student population ==
Southampton High School includes grades nine through twelve. The high school had 704 students for the 2026–2027 school year. The prior year, it had 752 students.

The student body is 48 percent female and 52 percent male. Its racial mix is 54.6 percent white, 39.8 percent Black, 2.7 percent mixed race, 2.3 percent Hispanic, .3 percent Native American, and .3 percent Asian, for a total of 45.4 percent minorities. 75 percent of the students are economically disadvantaged.

== Faculty ==
The school's principal is Dr. Camilla C. Ferebee. Its assistant principals are Sharone Bailey and Robert Parsons. The high school has 46 full-time equivalent teachers.

== Academics and rankings ==
U.S. News & World Report ranks Southampton High School 188th in the state of Virginia. It is ranked number 42 in the Virginia Beach, VA Metro Area high schools.

The high school's graduation rate is 88 percent, which is slightly below Virginia's median. With the class of 2024, 45 percent of seniors received an advanced diploma, 36.4 percent received a standard diploma, and 7.3 percent received a GED or certificate. 11.3 percenter of the class of 2024 dropped out without graduating.

The high school offers Advanced Placement (AP) courses, with 23 percent of the students participating in the program.

== Athletics ==
Southampton High School's mascot is the Indian. Its colors are red and white. Athletic teams compete in the Virginia High School League's AA Tri-Rivers District. It previously was a member of the AA Southside District in Region I. Southampton was the Tri-Rivers champion in baseball in 2019, 2021, 2022, 2023, 2024; football in 2018, 2023, and 2025; soccer in 2023 and 2024; softball in 2018 and 2024; men's cross country in 2021; and women's cross country 2021.

== Notable alumni ==
- Percy Ellsworth – professional football player with the New York Giants and Cleveland Browns
- S. Bernard Goodwyn, chief justice of the Supreme Count of Virginia
- Cyrus Lawrence, college football player
- Riddick Parker, professional football player
- Greg Scott – professional football player with the Washington Redskins and the Cincinnati Bengals

== See also ==
- List of high schools in Virginia
- List of secondary school sports team names and mascots derived from Indigenous peoples
