= Mecklenburg County Public Schools =

School district in Virginia, United States

Coordinates: 36.7056°N 78.4967°W

Mecklenburg County Public Schools is a school district headquartered in Boydton, Virginia, United States. It provides the public school education for students who live in Mecklenburg County.

== Organization ==
Mecklenburg County Public Schools is governed by the Board of Education that consists of a representative of each of the nine districts within the county together with the Superintendent, currently Mr. Paul C. Nicholas III . Dr. Scott Worner is replacing the retiring Mr. Nicholas June 2023.

The district runs a single high school middle school complex, four elementary schools and an Alternative Education Center. As of 2010, 32,727 students were being educated. In school year 2011-12 it had a budget of $44,239,944. All schools have obtained Standards of Learning accreditation.

== Performance ==
The Division was awarded five stars out of five for performance, by USA.com, and ranked 9th out of 130 divisions in Virginia.

== Schools ==
- Mecklenburg County High School
- Mecklenburg County Middle School
- Bluestone High School - Closed 2022
- Park View High School - Closed 2022
- Bluestone Middle School - Closed 2022
- Park View Middle School - Closed 2022
- Chase City Elementary School - opened September 6, 1935, in 2010-11 educated around 500 students in Grades PK-5.
- Clarksville Elementary School
- LaCrosse Elementary School
- South Hill Elementary School
