= Randolph-Henry High School =

School in Charlotte Co., Virginia, US (1938–)

Location
- 755 David Bruce Avenue; Charlotte Court House, Virginia; United States; 37°03′14″N 78°38′49″W

Information
- Type: Public
- Established: 1938; 88 years ago
- School district: Charlotte County Public Schools
- Principal: Erin Davis
- Faculty: 47.0 (on FTE basis)
- Grades: 9 to 12
- Enrollment: 547 (2016-17)
- Student to teacher ratio: 14.7:1
- Colors: Navy and white
- Mascot: Statesmen
- Website: RHHS home page

Randolph–Henry High School is a public high school, and the only high school located in Charlotte County, Virginia, United States. The high school has been recognized by numerous sources as a high standard achieving rural high school. Notable aspects of the school include the school agricultural farm, on which students in agriculture classes "work", as well as Statesmen Computers, a company that provides computers to colleges and universities throughout Virginia; these computers are built and distributed by students as well.

scoobert In 1965, Randolph–Henry High School began the integration process by admitting the first black students after court mandate.

== Athletics ==
Randolph-Henry is classified as a Double A school by the Virginia High School League and is part of the A James River District and A Region B. Their mascot, the Statesmen was inspired by the patriotism of the country's early leaders, such as John Randolph and Patrick Henry, for whom the school is named.

The school's baseball team has won two state championships in 2002 and 2005 and has won the Regional Championship eight times. Over fifty former baseball players from Randolph-Henry have gone on to play college in the past 40 years. Over that span of time, three coaches (Dick Bankston, Donnie Reebals and Billy Catron) combined to produce over 600 Varsity victories. The school's golf team, coached by Kelly Powell, is one of the best in the state, winning the state in 2005. They also placed third in the state in 2006, and second in the state in 2016. The varsity boys tennis team, coached by Kenny Howard, is also extremely talented, winning the A James River District for seven consecutive years, and being the A Region B runners-up during each of those years. In 2007, Zack Pack became the A State Boys' Tennis Singles Champion, following three years of being the Region B runner-up. Chris Boyd won the State Title for Randolph-Henry as a Junior in the 215 division of wrestling.

Three Randolph-Henry athletes have signed with NCAA Division I football teams since 2000: John McCargo and Ryan Hathaway. John McCargo of Drakes Branch, VA signed with the North Carolina State Wolfpack in 2002. After being a redshirt as a freshman, McCargo played three years with the Wolfpack until entering the NFL draft in 2006, and signing with the Buffalo Bills as a defensive lineman. Ryan Hathaway of Keysville, VA signed with Norfolk State University in 2007. Joe Reed played for University of Virginia from 2016 to 2019 and was listed as a first-team all-ACC player.

== Academic teams ==
Randolph-Henry has several academic teams and extracurricular programs, including theatre, forensics, ACE, and yearbook. The ACE, or Scholastic Bowl, team has won the James River District Championship in the All-Around category for six consecutive years and competed in the State Championship during the 2001–2002 and 2008–2009 school years.

The Forensics Team won the James River District Tournament Championship for 14 consecutive years from 1999 to 2012. The team was also the Virginia High School League (VHSL) state champion in 2004 and 2011 and state runner-up in 2009, 2010, and 2012. Seventeen individual state champions were associated with the team, including William Deford (1965), Ann Roger (1965), Brian Gard (1988, 1989, and 1990), William Collins (1992), April Hamilton (2001), Josh Goff (2003), Lewis Tedesco (2004), Sam Catron (2006), Sameera Gadiyaram (2007), Katie Cross (2009), Savannah Ketchum (2010), Mary Margaret Watkins (2010 and 2011), Ryan Larson (2011), Dayton Dunnavant (2011), Brittany Guill (2011), and Josh Lacks (2012).
