= Brunswick County, Virginia =

County in the United States

- County
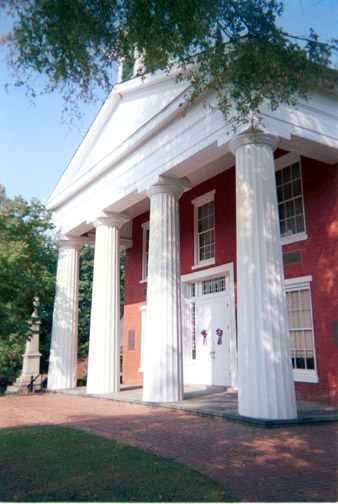
- Brunswick County Courthouse in Lawrenceville

- Seal

- Location within the U.S. state of Virginia
- Coordinates: 36°46′N 77°52′W
- Country: United States
- State: Virginia
- Founded: 1720
- Named for: Duchy of Brunswick-Lunenburg
- Seat: Lawrenceville
- Largest town: Lawrenceville

Area
  - Total: 569 sq mi (1,470 km^{2})
  - Land: 566 sq mi (1,470 km^{2})
  - Water: 3.2 sq mi (8.3 km^{2}) 0.6%

Population (2020)
  - Total: 15,849
  - Estimate (2025): 15,727 ▼
  - Density: 28.0/sq mi (10.8/km^{2})
- Time zone: UTC−5 (Eastern)
  - Summer (DST): UTC−4 (EDT)
- Congressional district: 4th
- Website: www.brunswickco.com

Brunswick County is a United States county located on the southern border of the Commonwealth of Virginia. Brunswick County was created in 1720 from parts of Prince George, Surry and Isle of Wight counties. The county was named for the former Duchy of Brunswick-Lunenburg, the ancestral home of the British monarchs of the House of Hanover.

As of the 2020 census, the population of Brunswick county was 15,849. The county has a total area of 569 square miles, and the county seat is Lawrenceville. Known for its rural character, the county is one of the claimants to be the namesake of Brunswick stew, a popular Southern dish.

== History ==
The first English settlers, in what was to become Brunswick County, swarmed into the relatively protected lands near Fort Christanna during its 4 years of operation (1714–1718). Among them were indentured servants, including men deported from Scotland in 1716 after being convicted by the Crown in the Jacobite rising of 1715. They were required to work under indenture to pay the Crown back for their ship passage. Gradually the colonists pushed many of the Native Americans out of the area.

An example of such a Scots rebel who started in the colony as a convict was James Pittillo. He survived his indenture and in 1726 was granted 242 acres (1.0 km^{2}) on Waqua Creek. He gradually became a major landowner in the area. He was appointed as a tobacco inspector in Bristol Parish in 1728 and that year served with William Byrd II on his spring and fall expeditions to survey the border between Virginia and North Carolina. Taking advantage of land grants due to headrights, for people whose passage he paid to the colony, and outright purchases, Pittillo ultimately owned more than 4,000 acres (16 km^{2}) in the area of Prince George County, Brunswick, and Dinwiddie counties in Southside Virginia.

Brunswick County was established in 1720 from Prince George County. The county is named for the former Duchy of Brunswick-Lunenburg in Germany. One of the titles carried by Britain's Hanoverian kings was Duke of Brunswick-Lunenburg. In 1732 the county received more land from parts of Surry and Isle of Wight counties. Brunswick County reached the Blue Ridge Mountains until 1745, when increasing population in the region resulted in the formation of a series of new counties, and Brunswick's current western border was established.

In 1780, during the American Revolutionary War, Greensville County was formed from part of Brunswick's eastern side. In 1787 the county's eastern border was finalized with a minor adjustment.

Today Brunswick County is bisected by Interstate 85 and U.S. routes 1 and 58. Planters originally cultivated the land for tobacco by slave labor in colonial times. As tobacco exhausted the soil and the markets changed, planters and smaller farmers diversified the mostly rural economy by raising mixed crops and harvesting lumber before the Civil War. As a result of these changes, slaveholders in the Upper South had surplus slaves; many sold them in the domestic slave trade. It fed the development of cotton plantations in the Deep South. Altogether, more than one million enslaved African Americans were sold South in the antebellum years in this forced migration, which broke up many families.

Saint Paul's College was established in this county in association with the Episcopal Church. In 1914 the school boasted that "The location of the school in the heart of the Black Belt of Virginia, with a Negro population of 100,000 almost at its very doors, is most favorable for the prosecution of uplift work." St. Paul's closed its doors in 2013.

In the early 21st century, the county has a campus of Southside Virginia Community College. The Fort Pickett Army National Guard base is partly in the county.

== Geography ==
According to the U.S. Census Bureau, the county has a total area of 569 square miles (1,470 km^{2}), of which 566 square miles (1,470 km^{2}) is land and 3.2 square miles (8.3 km^{2}) (0.6%) is water.

=== Adjacent counties ===
- Mecklenburg County – west
- Lunenburg County – west
- Nottoway County – northwest
- Dinwiddie County – north
- Greensville County – east
- Northampton County, North Carolina – south
- Warren County, North Carolina – south

=== Major highways ===
- I-85
- US 1
- US 58
- SR 46
- SR 136
- SR 137
- SR 378

== Demographics ==
Historical population
Census	Pop.	Note	%±
1790	12,827		—
1800	16,339		27.4%
1810	15,411		−5.7%
1820	16,687		8.3%
1830	15,767		−5.5%
1840	14,346		−9.0%
1850	13,894		−3.2%
1860	14,809		6.6%
1870	13,427		−9.3%
1880	16,707		24.4%
1890	17,245		3.2%
1900	18,217		5.6%
1910	19,244		5.6%
1920	21,025		9.3%
1930	20,486		−2.6%
1940	19,575		−4.4%
1950	20,136		2.9%
1960	17,779		−11.7%
1970	16,172		−9.0%
1980	15,632		−3.3%
1990	15,987		2.3%
2000	18,419		15.2%
2010	17,434		−5.3%
2020	15,849		−9.1%
2025 (est.)	15,727	▼	−0.8%
U.S. Decennial Census; 1790–1960 1900–1990; 1990–2000 2010 2020

=== Racial and ethnic composition ===
Brunswick County, Virginia – Racial and ethnic composition Note: the US Census treats Hispanic/Latino as an ethnic category. This table excludes Latinos from the racial categories and assigns them to a separate category. Hispanics/Latinos may be of any race.
Race / Ethnicity (NH = Non-Hispanic)	Pop 1980	Pop 1990	Pop 2000	Pop 2010	Pop 2020	% 1980	% 1990	% 2000	% 2010	% 2020
White alone (NH)	6,600	6,594	7,629	6,943	6,457	42.22%	41.25%	41.42%	39.82%	40.74%
Black or African American alone (NH)	8,902	9,321	10,416	9,944	8,573	56.95%	58.30%	56.55%	57.04%	54.09%
Native American or Alaska Native alone (NH)	4	9	15	35	23	0.03%	0.06%	0.08%	0.20%	0.15%
Asian alone (NH)	9	12	40	47	42	0.06%	0.08%	0.22%	0.27%	0.27%
Native Hawaiian or Pacific Islander alone (NH)	x	x	1	4	5	x	x	0.01%	0.02%	0.03%
Other race alone (NH)	8	4	10	9	29	0.05%	0.03%	0.05%	0.05%	0.18%
Mixed race or Multiracial (NH)	x	x	77	154	333	x	x	0.42%	0.88%	2.10%
Hispanic or Latino (any race)	109	47	231	298	387	0.70%	0.29%	1.25%	1.71%	2.44%
Total	15,632	15,987	18,419	17,434	15,849	100.00%	100.00%	100.00%	100.00%	100.00%

=== 2020 census ===
As of the 2020 census, the county had a population of 15,849. The median age was 46.6 years. 15.8% of residents were under the age of 18 and 22.8% of residents were 65 years of age or older. For every 100 females there were 117.1 males, and for every 100 females age 18 and over there were 119.6 males age 18 and over.

The racial makeup of the county is shown in the table above; by the 2020 census the population was 41.3% White, 54.3% Black or African American, 0.1% American Indian and Alaska Native, 0.3% Asian, 0.0% Native Hawaiian and Pacific Islander, 1.4% some other race, and 2.5% two or more races. Hispanic or Latino residents of any race comprised 2.4% of the population.

0.0% of residents lived in urban areas, while 100.0% lived in rural areas.

There were 6,191 households in the county, of which 23.3% had children under the age of 18 living with them and 34.1% had a female householder with no spouse or partner present. About 33.6% of all households were made up of individuals and 17.2% had someone living alone who was 65 years of age or older.

There were 7,893 housing units, of which 21.6% were vacant. Among occupied housing units, 71.6% were owner-occupied and 28.4% were renter-occupied. The homeowner vacancy rate was 1.2% and the rental vacancy rate was 6.4%.

=== 2010 census ===
As of the 2010 United States census, there were 17,434 people living in the county.

As of the census of 2000, there were 18,419 people, 6,277 households, and 4,312 families living in the county. The population density was 32 people per square mile (12 people/km^{2}). There were 7,541 housing units at an average density of 13 units per square mile (5.0 units/km^{2}). The racial makeup of the county was 41.99% White, 56.85% Black or African American, 0.09% Native American, 0.22% Asian, 0.01% Pacific Islander, 0.34% from other races, and 0.51% from two or more races. 1.25% of the population were Hispanic or Latino of any race.

There were 6,277 households, out of which 27.40% had children under the age of 18 living with them, 46.90% were married couples living together, 16.60% had a female householder with no husband present, and 31.30% were non-families. 27.60% of all households were made up of individuals, and 13.30% had someone living alone who was 65 years of age or older. The average household size was 2.47 and the average family size was 3.00.

In the county, the age distribution of the population shows 20.50% under the age of 18, 9.90% from 18 to 24, 30.70% from 25 to 44, 24.40% from 45 to 64, and 14.50% who were 65 years of age or older. The median age was 38 years. For every 100 females there were 113.10 males. For every 100 females aged 18 and over, there were 115.40 males.

The median income for a household in the county was $31,288, and the median income for a family was $38,354. Males had a median income of $26,924 versus $20,550 for females. The per capita income for the county was $14,890. About 13.20% of families and 16.50% of the population were below the poverty line, including 20.10% of those under age 18 and 19.50% of those age 65 or over.

== Government ==
=== Board of Supervisors ===
- Meherrin district: John Zubrod (I)
- Powellton district: Chair Welton Tyler (I)
- Red Oak district: Bernard L. Jones, Sr. (I)
- Sturgeon district: Vice-Chair Dr. Alfonzo R. Seward (I)
- Totaro district: Dr. Barbara Jarrett-Harris (I)

=== Constitutional officers ===
- Clerk of the Circuit Court: Jacqueline Seward-Morgan (I)
- Commissioner of the Revenue: Camilla Clayton-Bright
- Commonwealth's Attorney: Meredith Smith (I)
- Sheriff: Brian Roberts (I)
- Treasurer: Jackie Mangrum (I)

Brunswick County is represented by Republican Emily Jordan in the Virginia Senate, Republican Otto Wachsmann in the Virginia House of Delegates, and Democrat Jennifer McClellan in the U.S. House of Representatives.

United States presidential election results for Brunswick County, Virginia
Year	Republican		Democratic		Third party(ies)	
Year	No.	%	No.	%	No.	%
1912	67	8.77%	643	84.16%	54	7.07%
1916	82	9.60%	772	90.40%	0	0.00%
1920	125	12.56%	866	87.04%	4	0.40%
1924	65	6.62%	887	90.33%	30	3.05%
1928	245	20.99%	922	79.01%	0	0.00%
1932	52	3.65%	1,361	95.58%	11	0.77%
1936	60	4.40%	1,303	95.46%	2	0.15%
1940	164	11.26%	1,288	88.46%	4	0.27%
1944	208	14.37%	1,239	85.63%	0	0.00%
1948	229	10.40%	1,067	48.46%	906	41.14%
1952	1,098	39.97%	1,635	59.52%	14	0.51%
1956	799	25.28%	1,357	42.94%	1,004	31.77%
1960	926	31.58%	1,942	66.23%	64	2.18%
1964	2,560	57.58%	1,883	42.35%	3	0.07%
1968	1,139	22.13%	1,910	37.11%	2,098	40.76%
1972	3,072	58.17%	2,130	40.33%	79	1.50%
1976	2,387	42.11%	3,071	54.18%	210	3.71%
1980	2,310	39.39%	3,430	58.49%	124	2.11%
1984	2,950	48.58%	3,040	50.06%	83	1.37%
1988	2,742	46.60%	3,070	52.18%	72	1.22%
1992	2,480	36.92%	3,687	54.88%	551	8.20%
1996	2,059	34.79%	3,442	58.16%	417	7.05%
2000	2,561	42.70%	3,387	56.48%	49	0.82%
2004	2,852	41.18%	4,062	58.65%	12	0.17%
2008	2,877	36.35%	4,973	62.84%	64	0.81%
2012	2,968	36.93%	4,994	62.14%	75	0.93%
2016	3,046	39.72%	4,481	58.43%	142	1.85%
2020	3,357	42.24%	4,552	57.27%	39	0.49%
2024	3,523	45.45%	4,184	53.98%	44	0.57%

=== County government ===
The Virginia Department of Corrections Brunswick Correctional Center was in an unincorporated area near Lawrenceville.

== Education ==
Brunswick County Public Schools includes Brunswick High School.

== Brunswick stew ==
Brunswick County is best known as the origin place for Brunswick stew. The original Brunswick stew, according to Brunswick County historians, was created in 1828 by a black American chef, Mr. Jimmy Matthews, also referred to as "Uncle" by some locals. As the story goes, Dr. Creed Haskins of Mount Donum on the Nottoway River, a member of the Virginia State Legislature, took several friends on a hunting expedition. While the group hunted, Mr. Matthews, Haskin's enslaved camp cook, hunted squirrel for the evening meal. Mr. Matthews slowly stewed the squirrels in butter, with onions, stale bread and seasoning in a large iron pot. When the hunting party returned, they were reluctant to try the new, thick concoction, but one taste convinced them to ask for more.

Since that time, Brunswick stew has been prepared by many different "stew masters." It is often associated with the harvest season in the fall and completion of tobacco processing. Cooks produce large batches of the "Virginia ambrosia" for church functions, local fund raisers, family reunions, and political rallies. Each cook and generation add their variations to Jimmy Matthews's recipe for Brunswick stew: chicken has been substituted for squirrel and vegetables have been added.

During 1987, the Brunswick Industrial Development Commission and a committee of the Brunswick Chamber of Commerce, with the aid of a professional advertising agency, began a program to develop balanced economic growth in Brunswick County. They decided to capitalize on the county's home-grown Brunswick stew as a brand. On February 22, 1988, at the State Capitol in Richmond, Brunswick County officially kicked off a campaign to increase awareness of its economic development opportunities. The Brunswick Chamber of Commerce and the County of Brunswick hosted a Brunswick Stew-Fest on the Capitol grounds to celebrate the General Assembly's passing of a resolution proclaiming Brunswick County, Virginia, as "The Original Home of Brunswick Stew". The proclamation contains a tongue-in-cheek jab at Brunswick, Georgia, which claims to have created the traditional Southern dish, setting off what has been coined as "The Stew Wars."

One of the many traditional recipes, which requires 6 to 7 hours to cook, was renamed Brunswick Proclamation Stew for the occasion. A good Brunswick stew must be cooked down slowly, according to stew masters for the Capitol Square event, "Until the stirring paddle stands up straight in the stew." When the paddle stood, Brunswick stew was served to the legislators and hundreds of Virginians who turned out for the event to "Get a Taste of Brunswick."

With the help of the Fearnow Brothers, the County got its own stew label, approved by the U.S. Department of Agriculture (USDA). Their company also produces small quantities of canned Brunswick stew for the Chamber of Commerce to store and use. The cans bear the label "Virginia's Own – 1828-Brunswick County Stew".

A sample of Brunswick stew, along with information on the county's assets, was included in the county's promotional packages and sent to business and industry prospects. The stew and County are tied together with the campaign's theme: "Since 1828 when Ol’ Jimmy Matthews created Brunswick stew, we’ve been doing things a special way. A little slow, but right."

== Communities ==
=== Towns ===
- Alberta
- Brodnax (partial)
- Lawrenceville (county seat)

=== Census-designated places ===
- Ebony
- Gasburg
- Warfield

=== Unincorporated communities ===
- Ante
- Dolphin
- Freeman
- White Plains
- Wyche
- Edgerton

== Notable people ==
- Aaron Brown (1795–1859), Governor of Tennessee
- Albertis Harrison (1907–1995) Governor of Virginia
- George Jackson (1850–1900), American politician
- Goronwy Owen (1723-1769) Welsh-American poet, Episcopalian Vicar, and cotton and tobacco plantation owner
- Hon. Cleo Powell (1957- ), Justice on the Supreme Court of Virginia
- Peter Starke (1813–1888), politician and Confederate general
- Bryant Stith (1970- ), NBA basketball player
- Theophilus Orgain Powell (1837–1907), physician and superintendent of the Georgia Sate Sanitarium

== See also ==
- National Register of Historic Places listings in Brunswick County, Virginia
