= Brunswick High School (Virginia) =

Coordinates: 36°46′4.3″N 77°49′44.2″W

Location
- 2171 Lawrenceville Plank Road; Lawrenceville, Virginia 23868

Information
- School type: Public high school
- Locale: Rural, Remote
- School district: Brunswick County Public Schools
- NCES District ID: 5100480
- NCES School ID: 510048000183
- Principal: Ronnie Watson
- Teaching staff: 30.50 (on an FTE basis)
- Grades: 9–12
- Enrollment: 404 (2024–25)
- Student to teacher ratio: 13.25
- Language: English
- Colors: Royal Blue, White, Silver
- Mascot: Bulldog
- Rivals: Greensville County High School, Parkview High School
- Feeder schools: Russell Middle School
- Athletic Conference: Southside District; Region I
- Website: Official Site

Brunswick High School (BHS) is a public high school located in Lawrenceville, Virginia community in Brunswick County, Virginia. It is the only high school in the Brunswick County Public Schools system. The school was opened in 1976. Athletic teams compete in the Virginia High School League's AA Southside District in Region I. According to U.S. News, Brunswick High School's student body makeup is 51 percent male and 49 percent female, and the total minority enrollment is 80 percent. Brunswick High is the only high school in the Brunswick Co Public Schools.

== Enrollment History ==
School Year	Number of Students
2005-2006	453
2006-2007	619
2016-2017	556
