= Windsor High School (Virginia) =

Location
- 24 Church Street; Windsor, Virginia 23487; United States
- Coordinates: 36°48′38″N 76°44′22″W

Information
- School type: Public school
- School district: Isle of Wight County
- Superintendent: Theo Cramer
- Principal: Dawn Carroll
- Teaching staff: 37.94 (on an FTE basis)
- Grades: 9–12
- Enrollment: 553 (2020–2021)
- Student to teacher ratio: 14.58
- Language: English
- Colors: Royal Blue and Gold
- Athletics conference: Virginia High School League
- Team name: Dukes
- Website: whs.iwcs.k12.va.us

Windsor High School is a public high school located in Windsor, Virginia in Isle of Wight County.

== Administration ==
Dawn Carroll became principal of Windsor High School on July 1, 2022.

== Academics ==
Windsor High School is fully accredited under Virginia's Standards of Learning program. The current building was originally constructed in 1994, is 105,000 square feet, and is designed to hold 825 people. The staff members have an average of 14 years of experience in teaching. The school operates on a 10-point grading scale.

Windsor High was recognized with the Virginia Index of Performance “Competence to Excellence” Award: 2009 as well as Jostens National Recognition for Yearbook Design.

Windsor High School seniors accumulate over 2 million dollars in scholarships each year. Advanced Placement courses are offered at the school both in class and with Virtual Virginia. Dual credit is also offered for core area and career and technical education courses.

== Student life ==
School spirit is an integral part of life at Windsor High. Homecoming week is the biggest week of the year. Spirit week, the Homecoming parade (which almost all Isle of Wight residents attend), and the actual Homecoming game, make the week an exciting event. Students also frequent the Isle of Wight County Fair each September, the art club competes in the sand castle sculpting tournament at Neptune Festival in Virginia Beach in late September, the cheerleaders compete statewide every year, the marching dukes marching band competes in multiple field show and parade competitions every year, there is a talent show held in the auditorium each year, among many other exciting events that occur at WHS.

== Feeder Schools ==
Here is the feeder pattern for Windsor High School.

Windsor High School (9-12)

- Georgie D. Tyler Middle School (6-8)
  - Carrsville Elementary School (PreK-5)
  - Windsor Elementary School (PreK-5)
