= Salem City Schools =

School district in Salem, Virginia

Salem City Schools is a school division serving students living in Salem, Virginia, US.

== Personnel ==
The superintendent and Board members of Salem City Schools are listed on its Web site.

== Schools ==
Salem City has 6 schools; 4 elementary schools, 1 middle school, and 1 high school.

=== Elementary schools ===
- East Salem Elementary School
- George Washington Carver Elementary School
- South Salem Elementary School
- West Salem Elementary School

=== Secondary schools ===
==== Middle school ====
- Andrew Lewis Middle School

==== High school ====
- Salem High School
