= Greensville County Public Schools =

School division in Virginia, United States

Greensville County Public Schools is a school division headquartered in Emporia, Virginia, serving that city and Greensville County.

Circa 1972 there was an effort by Emporia residents to create a separate school division. On June 22, 1972, the United States Supreme Court denied the creation of the district on a 5–4 basis, with the four dissenters having been appointed by U.S. president Richard Nixon.

== Governance ==
The district has four school board members from Greensville County and two from Emporia.

== Schools ==
- Greensville County High School - Emporia
- Edward W. Wyatt Middle School - unincorporated area in Greensville County
- Belfield Elementary School - unincorporated area in the county
- Greensville Elementary School - unincorporated area in the county
