= Skipwith, Virginia =

Unincorporated community in Virginia, United States

- Unincorporated community
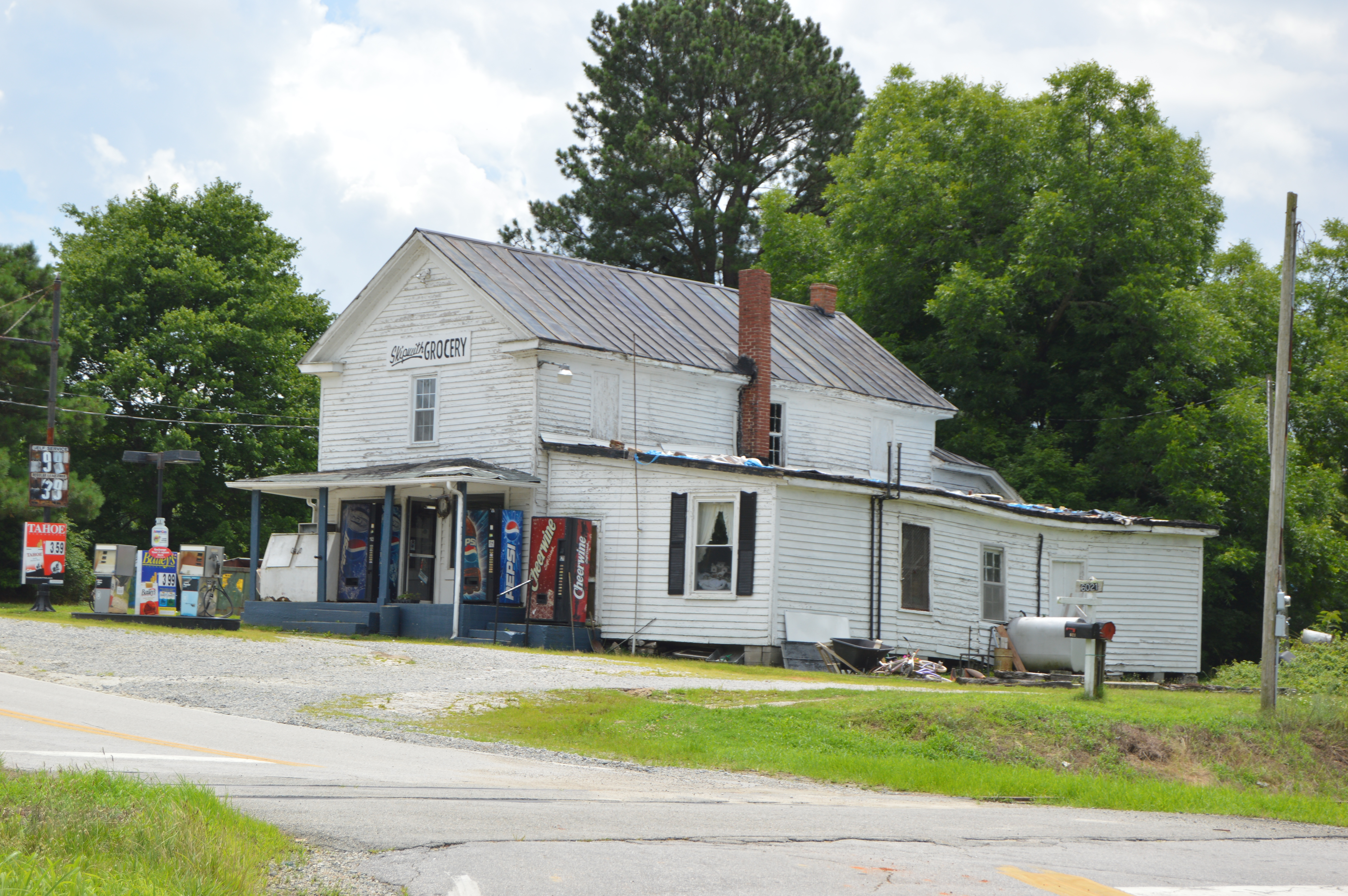
- Skipwith Grocery

- Location of Skipwith in Virginia Skipwith, Virginia (the United States)
- Coordinates: 36°41′40″N 78°29′27″W
- Country: United States
- State: Virginia
- County: Mecklenburg
- Elevation: 456 ft (139 m)
- Time zone: UTC−5 (EST)
  - Summer (DST): UTC−4 (EDT)
- ZIP code: 23968
- Area code: 434
- FIPS code: 51117
- GNIS feature ID: 1477137
- Other name: Five Forks

Skipwith is an unincorporated community in old Bluestone Township, Mecklenburg County, Virginia, United States. It is located between Chase City and Clarksville, west-northwest of the county seat at Boydton. The community was named for local members of the Skipwith family, related to colonial Virginia Skipwith families which began arriving from English baronial estates in the 1650s. The surname Skipwith is derived from Old English "sceap" (sheep) and Old Norse "vath" (ford or wading place). One ancient Skipwith coat of arms is blazoned "Argent, three bars Gules, in chief a greyhound courant Sable."

== History ==
Red Fox Farm was listed on the National Register of Historic Places in 1993.

== Geography and climate ==
Skipwith is located at 36°41′40″N 78°29′27″W (36.6943070, −78.4908321). Skipwith is 139 meters (456 feet) above sea level.

Skipwith lies in the Piedmont area of Virginia and has a humid sub-tropical climate generalized by hot, humid summers and cool to chilly winters. The average annual rainfall is 42.7 inches with winter-time snowfall averaging 3.5 inches.

== Demographics ==
The ZIP Code Tabulation Area (ZCTA) for Skipwith ZIP Code, 23968, had an estimated population of 912 in the year 2000, and rose to 1,057 in the year 2010.

== Education ==
Skipwith is the site of the Bluestone High School "Barons" (1955-2022) and the Bluestone Middle School "Trojans."

== Sources ==
- https://www.census.gov/census2000/states/va.html
- https://geonames.usgs.gov/ Feature Detail Report for Skipwith
