= Mecklenburg County Courthouse (Virginia) =

Historic courthouse in Virginia, US

- U.S. National Register of Historic Places
- U.S. Historic district – Contributing property
- Virginia Landmarks Register
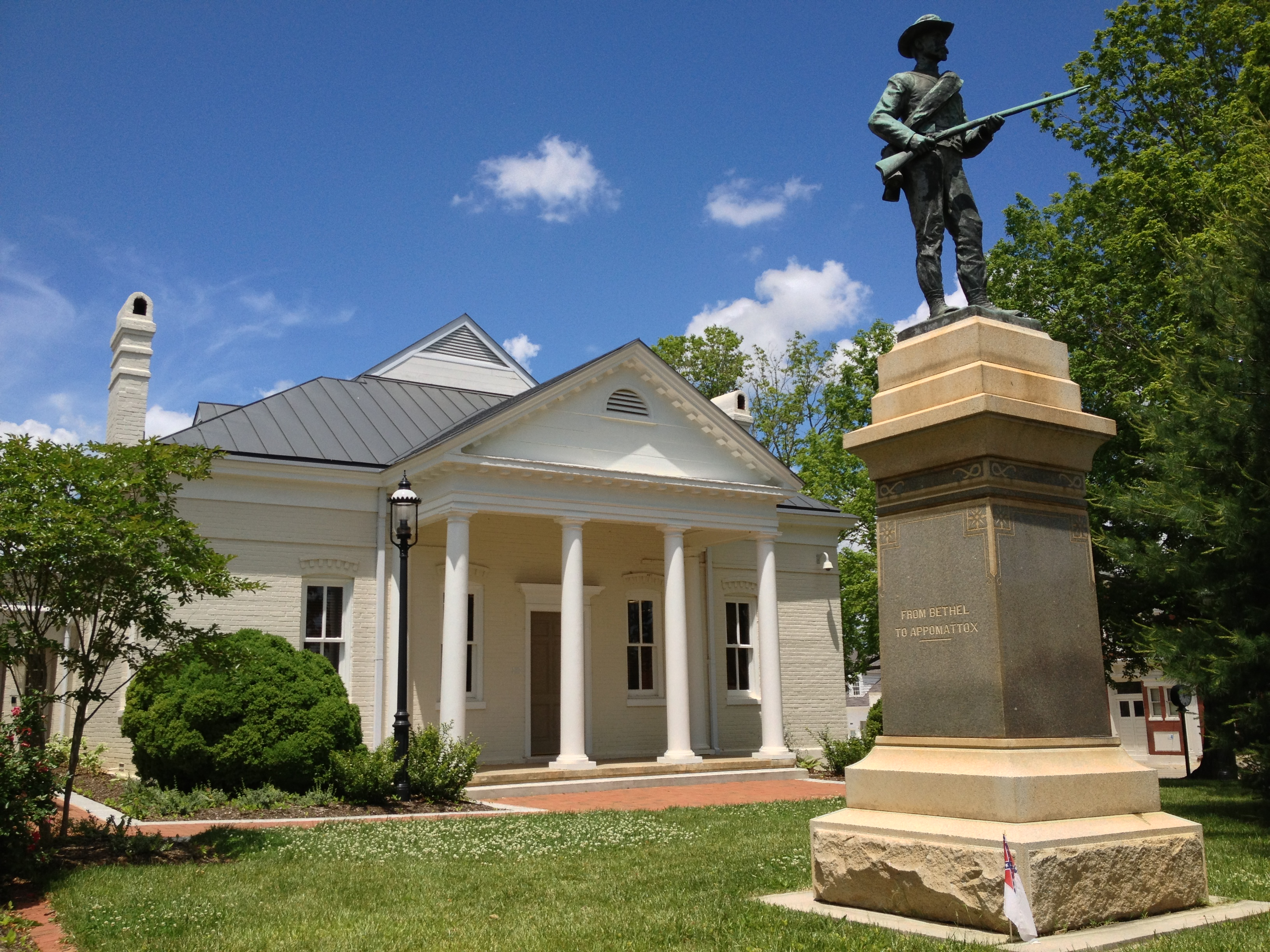

- Location within Virginia Location within the United States
- Interactive map showing the location of Mecklenburg County Courthouse
- Location: SW corner of jct. of U.S. 58 and VA 92, Boydton, Virginia
- Coordinates: 36°40′0″N 78°23′20″W
- Area: 2 acres (0.81 ha)
- Built: 1838-1842
- Architect: Howard, William A.
- Architectural style: Early Republic, Roman Revival
- NRHP reference No.: 75002025
- VLR No.: 173-0006

Significant dates
- Added to NRHP: July 17, 1975
- Designated VLR: June 17, 1975

Mecklenburg County Courthouse is a historic courthouse building located at Boydton, Mecklenburg County, Virginia. It was built in 1838–1842, and is a large two-story, Roman Revival brick temple-form structure. It is five-bays wide and five-bays deep and features a hexastyle Ionic order portico. The building has a two-story rear ell.

It was listed on the National Register of Historic Places in 1975. It is located in the Boydton Historic District.

The Confederate monument on the courthouse square was removed on the 22nd August 2021.
