= Brunswick County Public Schools =

School district in Virginia, United States

Address
- 1718 Farmers Field Road, Lawrenceville Brunswick County, Virginia United States

District information
- Motto: Educating Students. Inspiring Success. Improving Tomorrow.
- Superintendent: Dr. Darnell Carter

Other information
- Website: https://www.brunswickcps.org

Brunswick County Public Schools is a school district in Brunswick County, Virginia, United States. The district consists of three elementary schools, one middle school and one high school. School usually starts after the Labor Day holiday. The current acting superintendent is Dr. F. Darnell Carter.

== Ethnicity ==
Brunswick County Public Schools has a total of 2,260 students with White 20%, Black or African American 79% and Asian/Pacific Islander and Hispanic together less than 1%

== Schools ==
=== Elementary schools ===
- Meherrin-Powellton Elementary School is an elementary school located south of Lawrenceville, Virginia serving grades PreK-5. The current principal is Sandra King. The school mascot is the Eagles.
- Red Oak-Sturgeon Elementary School is an elementary school located in Alberta, Virginia serving grades PreK-5. The current principal is Carolyn Meredith. The school mascot is the Panthers. It is the newest school in Brunswick County. Red Oak-Sturgeon used to be two separate schools as Red Oak Elementary School and Sturgeon Elementary School but because Sturgeon Elementary SOL test scores were below average in recent years it closed down. Central Services moved into its former building and now Red Oak-Sturgeon is housed in the previous Red Oak Elementary School building.
- Totaro Elementary School is an elementary located in Lawrenceville, Virginia serving grades PreK-5. The current principal is Tonia Taylor The school mascot is the Indians.

=== Middle school ===
- James Solomon Russell Middle School (formerly James Solomon Russell Junior High School) is the only middle school serving Brunswick County. Russell Middle School is located in Lawrenceville, Virginia serving grades 6–8. The current principal is Dr. Virginia G. Berry. The school mascot is the Lions. The 2006-2007 school was the first school year that Russell Middle served grades 6-8 when it used to serve grades 7–9.

=== High school ===
- Brunswick High School is the only high school serving Brunswick County. Brunswick High School is a comprehensive high school located in Lawrenceville serving grades 9–12. The school mascot is the Bulldogs. The current principal is Dr. Mark Harrison. From 2005 to 2006 Brunswick High School went through a capital improvement project renovating and building a new gymnasium, cafeteria, and library. Brunswick High used to serve grades 10-12 when it was called Brunswick Senior High School but because of the capital improvement project it now serves grades 9–12. The old library and cafeteria were demolished from the inside and the space was used to build more classrooms.
