= Greene County Public Schools =

School district in Virginia, United States

The Greene County Public Schools system is a branch of the Greene County, Virginia county government. It administers public schools in the county and Stanardsville, Virginia. The superintendent of schools is Andrea Whitmarsh.

== School Board Members ==
The school board is made up of six members:

- Dr. Andrea Whitmarsh - Superintendent
- Ms. Cara Bickers - Vice-Chair - Monroe District
- Ms. Cherish Alberts - Ruckersville District
- Ms. Becky Roach - Stanardsville District
- Ms. Kelly Greer - Chair - At-Large
- Mr. David Mastervich - Midway District

== Schools ==
=== High school ===
- William Monroe High School (Grades: 9–12)

=== Middle school ===
- William Monroe Middle School (Grades: 6–8)

=== Elementary schools ===
- Nathanael Greene Elementary School (Grades: 3–5)
- Ruckersville Elementary School (Grades: K-5)

=== Primary school ===
- Nathanael Greene Primary School (Grades K-2)

== See also ==
- List of school districts in Virginia
