= Nottoway County High School =

Public high school in Virginia, US

Nottoway High School
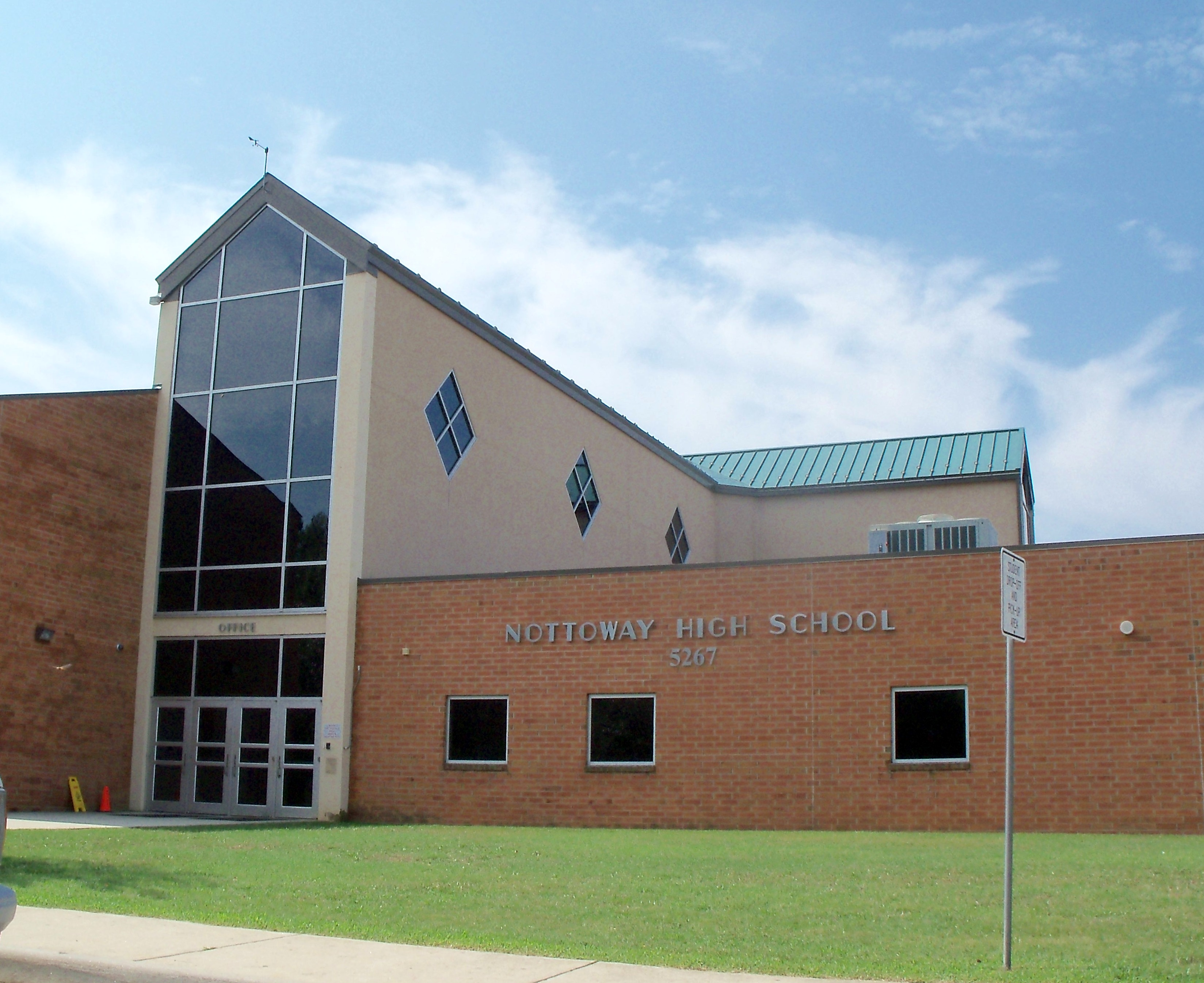

Location
- 5267 Old Nottoway Rd; Crewe, Virginia 23930; United States
- Coordinates: 37°7′23″N 78°3′56″W

Information
- School type: Public, high school
- School district: Nottoway County School Division
- Principal: Reginald Wilson
- Grades: 9–12
- Enrollment: 617 (2016-17)
- Language: English
- Colors: Maroon, Gold
- Athletics conference: James River District
- Mascot: Cougars
- Rival: Lunenburg High school
- Feeder schools: Nottoway Intermediate Nottoway Middle School
- Website: Official Site

Nottoway High School is a public high school located in Nottoway County, Virginia. It is part of the Nottoway County School Division. Athletic teams compete in the Virginia High School League's AA James River District in the VHSL 2A East division Conference 34.

== Notable alumni ==
- Maurice Anderson, American football player
- Michael Hawkes, American football player
- Robert Jones, NFL Pro Bowl linebacker
