= Boydton, Virginia =

- Town
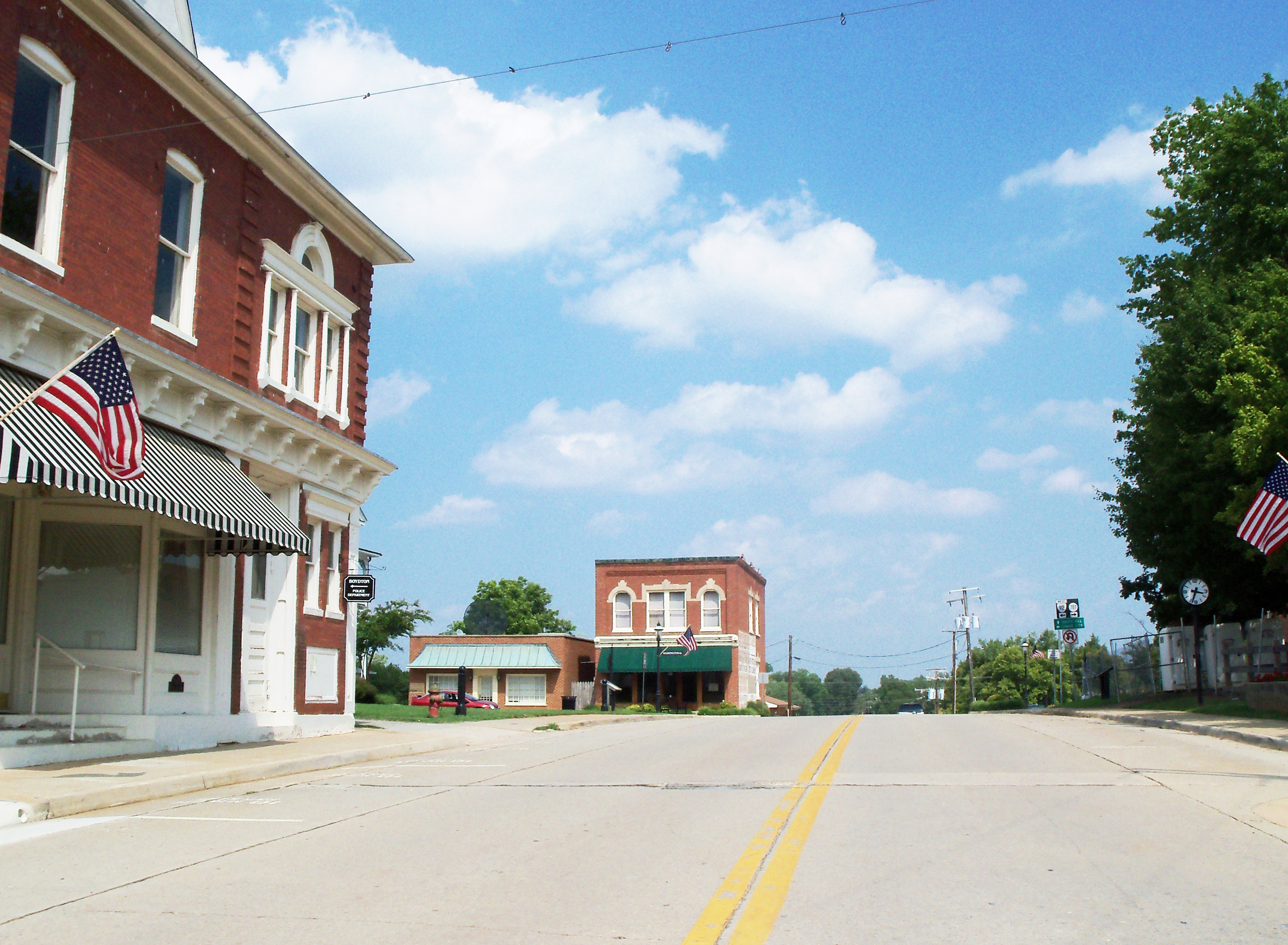
- Street scene in Boydton

- Flag Seal Logo

- Location within the state of Virginia Boydton, Virginia (the United States)
- Coordinates: 36°40′5″N 78°23′20″W
- Country: United States
- State: Virginia
- County: Mecklenburg

Area
  - Total: 0.82 sq mi (2.13 km^{2})
  - Land: 0.82 sq mi (2.13 km^{2})
  - Water: 0 sq mi (0.00 km^{2})
- Elevation: 354 ft (108 m)

Population (2020)
  - Total: 302
  - Density: 368/sq mi (142.2/km^{2})
- Time zone: UTC−5 (Eastern (EST))
  - Summer (DST): UTC−4 (EDT)
- ZIP code: 23917
- Area code: 434
- FIPS code: 51-09016
- GNIS feature ID: 1498456
- Website: https://boydton.org/

Boydton is a town in Mecklenburg County, Virginia, United States. The population was 302 at the 2020 census. It is the county seat of Mecklenburg County, and it is near Kerr Lake.

== Geography ==
Boydton is located at 36°40′05″N 78°23′20″W (36.667997, −78.389001). According to the United States Census Bureau, the town has a total area of 0.8 square miles (2.1 km^{2}), all land.

== Demographics ==
Historical population
Census	Pop.	Note	%±
1870	261		—
1880	382		46.4%
1900	527		—
1910	421		−20.1%
1920	457		8.6%
1930	492		7.7%
1940	424		−13.8%
1950	501		18.2%
1960	449		−10.4%
1970	541		20.5%
1980	486		−10.2%
1990	453		−6.8%
2000	454		0.2%
2010	431		−5.1%
2020	302		−29.9%
U.S. Decennial Census

As of the census of 2000, there were 454 people, 134 households, and 95 families residing in the town. The population density was 553.0 people per square mile (213.8/km^{2}). There were 165 housing units at an average density of 201.0 per square mile (77.7/km^{2}). The racial makeup of the town was 58.15% White, 39.21% African American, 1.54% from other races, and 1.10% from two or more races. Hispanic or Latino of any race were 2.42% of the population.

There were 134 households, out of which 23.9% had children under the age of 18 living with them, 58.2% were married couples living together, 11.9% had a female householder with no husband present, and 28.4% were non-families. 26.9% of all households were made up of individuals, and 16.4% had someone living alone who was 65 years of age or older. The average household size was 2.40 and the average family size was 2.88.

In the town the population was spread out, with 15.4% under the age of 18, 13.4% from 18 to 24, 28.4% from 25 to 44, 22.2% from 45 to 64, and 20.5% who were 65 years of age or older. The median age was 40 years. For every 100 females, there were 121.5 males. For every 100 females age 18 and over, there were 132.7 males.

The median income for a household in the town was $29,063, and the median income for a family was $38,125. Males had a median income of $25,417 versus $25,208 for females. The per capita income for the town was $14,034. About 6.0% of families and 13.3% of the population were below the poverty line, including 12.1% of those under age 18 and 17.9% of those age 65 or over.

== History ==
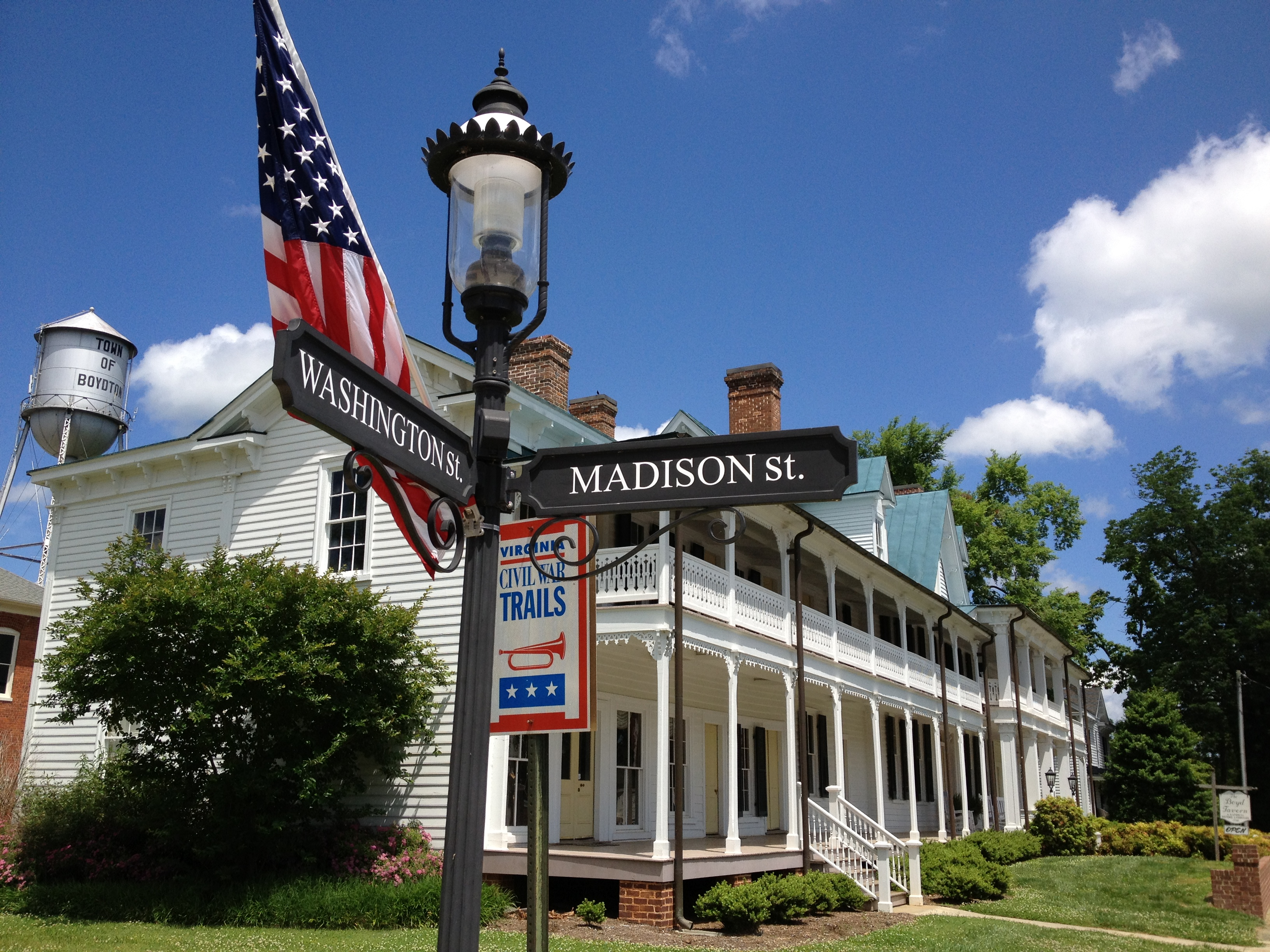
Boyd Tavern in Boydton, built 1790 and open for tours

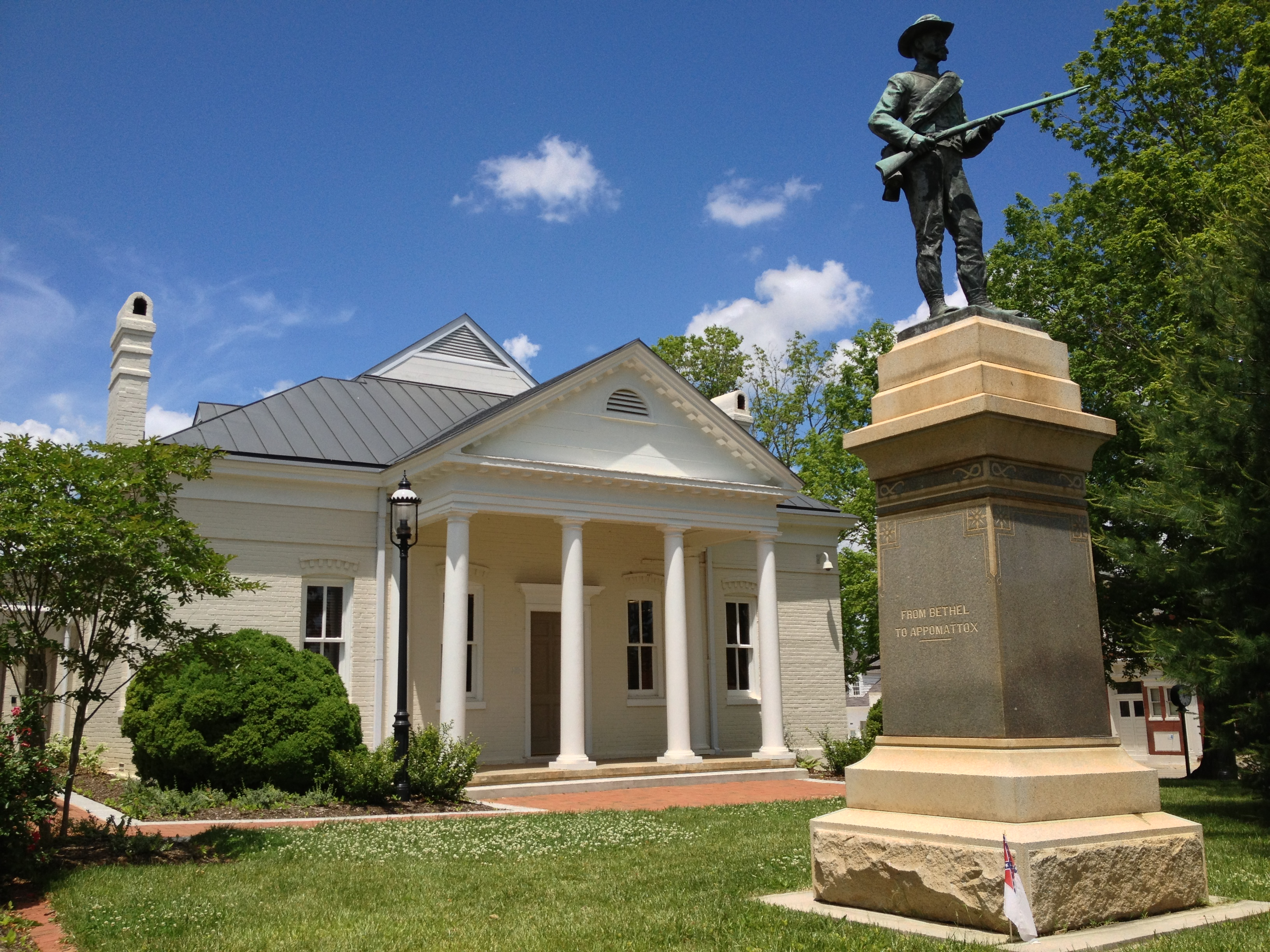
Mecklenburg County Courthouse in Boydton, completed in 1842

Boydton was founded in 1812. It was home the original campus of Randolph-Macon College and Boydton Academic and Bible Institute which succeeded it after its move to Ashland, Virginia. The school was small and barely stayed in operation during the Civil War as its focus abruptly changed from a Methodist seminary to military cadet training. In the difficult post-war Reconstruction years the trustees relocated the remote and struggling school to its present location in Ashland, closer to railroad service.

Boydton/Clarksville was the terminus of the 19th-century "Boydton and Petersburg Plank Road" leading to Petersburg. This 80-mile (130-km) Plank road was covered with wooden planks, making it superior to other roads which were just unpaved dirt and rutted.

Boyd's Tavern is an early 19th-century structure originally operated by merchant Alexander Boyd, a Scottish immigrant, which in recent years has been restored by his descendants and opened to public tours.

In 1952 the large Kerr Lake was created nearby, drawing many boaters, campers, and fishermen to the local area (see Clarksville, Virginia).

In addition to Boyd's Tavern, the Boydton Historic District and the Mecklenburg County Courthouse are listed on the National Register of Historic Places in 2002.

== Government and infrastructure ==
The United States Postal Service operates the Boydton Post Office in Boydton.

The Virginia Department of Corrections formerly operated the Mecklenburg Correctional Center in unincorporated Mecklenburg County, near Boydton. In 2012, Mecklenburg Correctional Center was closed and subsequently demolished.

Public school education is provided by Mecklenburg County Public Schools which is headquartered in the city.

In 2010, Microsoft began construction of a $500 million data center in Boydton. In 2014, $350 million was spent on its expansion.

== Notable people ==
- Mark Alexander (1792–1883), born near Boydton, United States Congressman from Virginia
- William A. Burwell (1780–1821), born near Boydton, State Legislator and United States Congressman from Virginia, private secretary for President Thomas Jefferson.
- Henry Johnson (1850–1904) born in Boydton, Buffalo Soldier, US Army, Medal of Honor recipient.
- Nancy Byrd Turner, poet, editor and lecturer (1880-1971) born in Boydton.
- Odicci Alexander (1998-) James Madison University softball pitcher

== Climate ==
The climate in this area is characterized by hot, humid summers and generally mild to cool winters. According to the Köppen Climate Classification system, Boydton has a humid subtropical climate, abbreviated "Cfa" on climate maps.
