= Surry County Public Schools =

School district in Virginia, United States

Surry County Public Schools is a Virginia school division serving Surry County, Virginia.

The public schools include:

- Surry County High School
- Luther Porter Jackson Middle School
- Surry Elementary School
