= Park View High School (South Hill, Virginia) =

Location
- 205 Park View Circle; South Hill, Virginia 23970; United States
- Coordinates: 36°42′11″N 78°11′00″W

Information
- School type: Public, high school
- Founded: 1955
- Closed: 2022
- School district: Mecklenburg County Public Schools
- Superintendent: Paul Nichols
- Principal: Dominique Sturdifen
- Grades: 9–12
- Enrollment: 1,211 (2016-2017)
- Language: English
- Colors: Green & White
- Athletics conference: Southside District; Region I
- Mascot: Dragons
- Rival: Brunswick High School, Bluestone High School
- Website: Official Site

Park View High School was a public high school located in South Hill, Virginia community in Mecklenburg County, Virginia. It is part of the Mecklenburg County Public Schools and opened in 1955. It closed in 2022, consolidating with former rivals Bluestone High School to form the new Mecklenburg County High School. Athletic teams competed in the Virginia High School League's AA in Region I.

== Enrollment History ==
School Year	Number of Students
2005-2006	741
2006-2007	744

== Notable alumni ==
- Odicci Alexander, professional and former collegiate All-American softball two-way pitcher for the USSSA Pride.
- Waverly Jackson, professional football player
- Rick Hendrick, Owner and CEO of Hendrick Motorsports.
