= Swiped (soundtrack) =

Swiped (Original Soundtrack)

Film score by Chanda Dancy
- Released: September 19, 2025
- Recorded: 2025
- Genre: Film score
- Length: 40:21
- Label: Hollywood
- Producer: Chanda Dancy

Chanda Dancy chronology
I Know What You Did Last Summer (2025)	Swiped (2025)	The Collaboration (2026)

Swiped (Original Soundtrack) is the film score composed by Chanda Dancy to the 2025 biographical film Swiped directed by Rachel Lee Goldenberg starring Lily James as Whitney Wolfe Herd, founder and CEO of the dating app Bumble. The soundtrack was released through Hollywood Records on September 19, 2025.

== Background ==
The film score is composed by Chanda Dancy who had described the score a "synth utopia with a hidden 72-piece orchestra". She treated the orchestra as a synthesizer instrument, by recording orchestral passages and later chopping, reversing and filtering them through electronic textures to sound like a synth instrument. The theme song for Whitney was considered a "mind theme" which utilizes electronic arpeggios and a kick drum that represents a heartbeat and CPU wheels turning. For the dark musical themes, Dancy was inspired by Ludwig van Beethoven's "Piano Sonata No. 14" by layering classical string arpeggios over a bass-heavy synthesizer. For the scenes of the invention of Tinder, Dancy utilized a upbeat, old-school synth theme with Sequential Prophet-6, Minimoog and Roland Juno-X. Besides composing the score, she wrote an original song "All the Stars are Raging" to represent optimism and a healthy working environment for women. A cover version of "Get Lucky" was performed by Deap Vally and was released as a single on September 12, 2025. The soundtrack was released through Hollywood Records on September 19.

== Track listing ==
No.	Title	Length
1.	"First Day at Hatch Labs"	2:04
2.	"Naming Tinder"	1:28
3.	"Dating Research"	0:55
4.	"The Invention of the Swipe"	2:10
5.	"Stalling the Sorority"	0:52
6.	"Newest Co-Founder"	2:10
7.	"Don't Burn Down the Bars"	1:03
8.	"Texts"	1:06
9.	"Rushing to the Office"	1:07
10.	"1 Million Users"	1:29
11.	"Paranoia Grows"	2:38
12.	"Confrontation"	1:07
13.	"Leaked NDA"	3:08
14.	"Doom Scrolling Depression"	3:37
15.	"New Beginnings"	1:25
16.	"Fixing Dating/Recruiting Tisha"	1:35
17.	"Bumble Rising/All the Stars Are Raging" (Ronan My Love)	2:35
18.	"Bad News"	3:47
19.	"Atoning for Past Mistakes"	3:24
20.	"All the Stars Are Raging" (Ronan My Love)	2:41
Total length:		40:21

== Reception ==
Barry Levitt of Time wrote "Swiped has an electric, relentless momentum buoyed by rapid pacing and a lively score from composer Chanda Dancy." Alissa Wilkinson of The New York Times considered Dancy's music as "haunting". Jessica Kiang of Variety and Angie Han of The Hollywood Reporter called the score "structural" and "functional". The Davis Enterprise called it a "lively score". Keith Whittier of Ottawa Life Magazine wrote "The score by Chanda Dancy adds emotional resonance, yet the film's structure undermines its impact."

== Accolades ==
Award	Date of ceremony	Category	Recipient(s)	Result	Ref.
Hollywood Music in Media Awards	November 19, 2025	Best Original Score – TV/Streamed Movie	Chanda Dancy	Nominated	
