= College Lake Dam =

Dam in Lynchburg, Virginia

Coordinates: 37°24′6″N 79°11′4″W

College Lake Dam is a dam on Blackwater Creek in Lynchburg, Virginia, located near the University of Lynchburg. In 2018, a major flood caused the dam to overflow, leading to around 150 evacuations. The dam is currently managed by the Lynchburg City Council.

== History ==
The dam was first constructed in 1934 on Blackwater Creek and created College Lake. It was originally built through a partnership between the University of Lynchburg (then called Lynchburg College) and the Virginia Department of Transportation (then called Virginia Department of Highways), and it was intended to improve transportation in the area.

Lynchburg College donated part of its land to the state of Virginia to build a 35-foot-high dam across Blackwater Creek as part of the building of Highway 460 west of Lynchburg. The initial size of the lake was 44 acres, and it was as deep as 30 feet in some parts. In newspapers of the time, it was described as a “scenic body of water,” and many people in the community began using it. In the decades after construction, it was a popular recreational spot for the college's college as well as residents. It was used for activities such as boating, fishing, and swimming when the temperatures allowed, and ice skating in the winter.

By the 1990s, sediment accumulation, nutrient runoff, and raw sewage from development upstream had a detrimental effect on the college lake ecosystem. By 2005, the lake had shrunk from its original 44 acres to 19 acres, and its average depth was only 7 feet, with some areas accumulating enough sediment to reach the surface. Virginia enacted stricter dam safety laws in 2008, and as a result, the College Lake Dam was designated a “high hazard” dam This led to the state stopping regular operation and maintenance certificates for the College Lake Dam, placing it under conditional status.

The city of Lynchburg now had to consider its options for the dam. The two options they considered were rehabilitating the dam to meet modern-day standards or draining the lake and reconnecting it to Blackwater Creek.

In 2011, the dam was not issued an operations and maintenance certificate and was placed under conditional status. In 2014, the City of Lynchburg began exploring options to return the dam to standard regulations. Two possible solutions were considered: reinforcing the dam, which was predicted to cost about $8.5 million, or removing the dam and restoring the area, which was predicted to cost about $10 million.

On 2 August 2018, in the evening, around 6 inches of rain fell within 2 hours, causing 12 inches of water to flow over the roadway above the dam across Lakeside Drive and into Blackwater Creek. This event possibly created or exacerbated structural damage to its outfall side, and experts warned it could fail at any time. Emergency workers evacuated 150 residents living downstream of the dam to E.C. Glass High School, which was being used as a Red Cross shelter. This event drew national and even international attention to this area due to the National Weather Service warning that water depths in Lynchburg could reach 17 feet in as little as 7 minutes if the dam failed.

The lake was drained quickly after this occurred so could inspect the dam and make temporary repairs. The cost of long-term restoration efforts was estimated at around $20 million. Officials decided not to refill College Lake. Blackwater Creek continued carrying debris toward the James River, and the spillway frequently became clogged. Further research showed that keeping the lake empty did not reduce the risk of future flooding. Debris clogged the emergency outfall, and sediment was flowing downstream, so the lake was refilled in October 2018 until a permanent solution could be implemented. In December 2019, the City of Lynchburg and the University of Lynchburg announced the start of the College Lake Dam Removal Project.

These issues led the City of Lynchburg and the University of Lynchburg to work together on the College Lake Dam Removal Project, which aims to remove the high-hazard dam and restore the natural environment of the lakebed. The dam on College Lake blocked the natural flow of Blackwater Creek for more than 80 years. On 23 May 2024, the final section of the dam was breached. Allowing the creek to flow freely again. This reconnection allowed Blackwater Creek to flow through its natural channel for the first time in about 90 years.

== Issues ==
The College Lake Dam was originally constructed to provide recreational opportunities for the University of Lynchburg. However, issues associated with the dam began to emerge soon after its construction. One of the primary problems was that the engineers responsible for the project did not fully account for the lake’s position within the broader watershed that feeds into the area. At the time of construction, the surrounding landscape was largely composed of farmland and forest, and urban development in the nearby Forest, Virginia, area was minimal. Under these conditions, sediment and nutrient input into the lake remained relatively manageable, and the reservoir functioned largely as intended.

Over time, however, the watershed saw significant changes. As the population of the surrounding area increased, development expanded rapidly, bringing with it roads, parking lots, buildings, and other impervious surfaces. These changes dramatically altered the flow and composition of the watershed. Stormwater runoff increased in both volume and velocity, carrying with it greater amounts of sediment, nutrients, and occasionally untreated sewage into the lake. As these materials accumulated behind the dam, sedimentation became a serious problem.

The buildup of sediment gradually transformed the lake's physical characteristics. A reservoir covering around 45 acres with a maximum depth of roughly 30 feet was reduced to a much smaller and shallower body of water. By the time concerns reached a critical point, the lake had shrunk to roughly 14 acres with an average depth of only about three feet. This dramatic reduction in both surface area and depth significantly diminished the lake’s recreational value while simultaneously increasing the maintenance challenges.

At the same time, the dam itself, standing approximately 35 feet tall, was becoming increasingly outdated. Aging infrastructure combined with growing sediment raised concerns about the dam’s ability to safely manage flood events. If the structure were to fail or overflow, the consequences could pose a serious risk to communities downstream along Blackwater Creek. The spillway at the foot of the lake, which measures roughly 60 feet in width, was originally designed for hydrologic conditions that no longer reflected the modern watershed, meaning failure was imminent. Although sedimentation was an inevitable consequence of watershed processes, additional environmental pressures further exacerbated the situation.

The 2018 storm ultimately served as a turning point. In response to the damage and clear risks posed by aging infrastructure, authorities made the decision to drain College Lake. This event underscored the urgency of addressing the long standing issues associated with the dam and prompted both the City of Lynchburg and the University of Lynchburg to revisit the site. The draining of the lake marked the beginning of a broader discussion about dam removal, watershed restoration, and sustainable management of the Blackwater Creek system.

== Restoration of upper stream section ==
A new channel for black water creek was created through the former in order to restore flow. The channel was reinforced with boulders and gravel for stabilization, erosion prevention, and as a new fish spawning area. Bio D-block was used to stabilize the soil and stream channels, along with wood to provide habitats for marine life and stability for the stream. New wetlands have been added around the creek to help filter stormwater. The wetlands and surrounding area will be planted with native wetland species, stakes, and trees, along with other native vegetation.

== Future ==
Future management of the lake aims to stabilize the area, create new wetlands, and remove and manage legacy sediments. After Lynchburg Water Resources' restoration of the lake is complete, long term management will be transferred back to the University of Lynchburg.
