= Jamisha Gilbert =

American YouTuber (1995–2013)

- Born: March 29, 1995; Baltimore, Maryland, U.S.
- Died: December 4, 2013 (aged 18); Lynchburg, Virginia, U.S.
- Cause of death: Hypothermia

Jamisha Monique Gilbert (March 29, 1995 - December 4, 2013) was an American YouTube personality who mysteriously died on December 4, 2013, after smoking marijuana.

== Education ==
Jamisha graduated from Heritage High School in 2013. She had plans to go to The University of Maryland to study law.

== Disappearance and death ==
Gilbert was found dead in a briar patch near Megginson Cemetery on December fourth. Crews, who scoured the area for days after she disappeared, used chainsaws to reach her body in the heavily wooded area. She was naked when discovered, yet there was no evidence of sexual assault. She had small amounts of marijuana in her system; the drug likely contributed to death, although the degree to which marijuana contributed to death is uncertain. She was covered in scratches, most likely from a car accident which happened moments prior to her death, in which her car crashed into a guardrail at the intersection of Concord Turnpike and Winston Ridge Road. The main cause of death was listed as hypothermia.
