= Anthony Parnther =

American conductor and bassonist

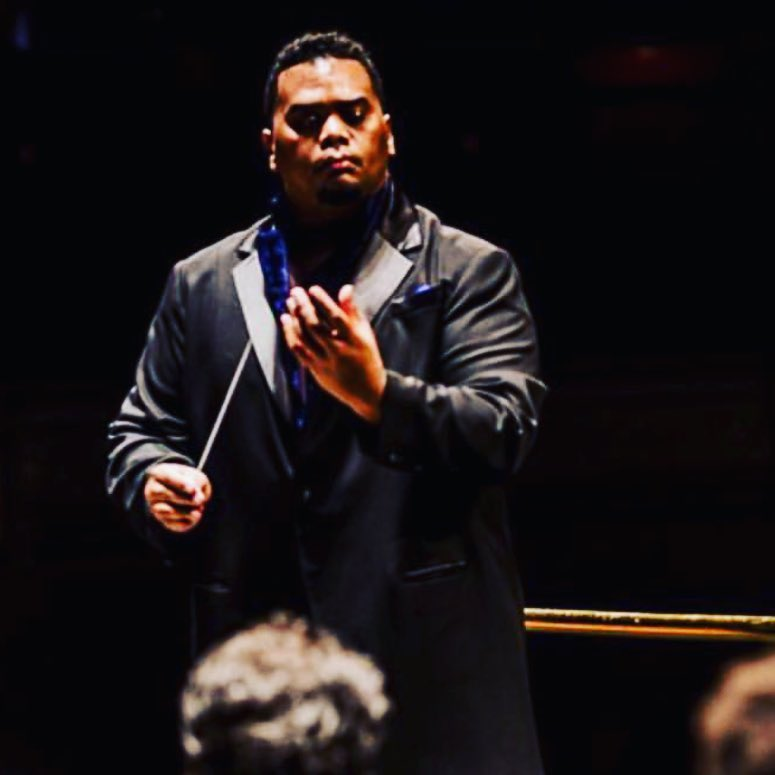
- Parnther conducting at the Teatro Real in Madrid, Spain

Background information
- Born: Norfolk, Virginia, U.S.
- Genres: Classical music; contemporary classical music; film score; video game music; avant-garde; jazz
- Instruments: Bassoon, contrabassoon, cello
- Years active: 1988–present
- Label: NMC Recordings
- Website: www.anthonyparnther.com

Anthony Parnther is an American conductor, bassoonist, and educator, prominently known for his work conducting and playing on critically acclaimed film scores.

In 2019 he was appointed music director and conductor of the San Bernardino Symphony Orchestra in San Bernardino, California and concurrently serves as the music director of the Southeast Symphony in Los Angeles, California, a position he has held since 2010.

== Early life and family ==
Anthony Parnther was born in Norfolk, Virginia, to Samalauluoloitefu (née Paese), an economist and professor, and George Parnther, an engineer.

Around 1949, George Parnther emigrated to the United States from Kingston, Jamaica and enlisted in the U.S. Navy before serving in the Korean War. George eventually matriculated from the Massachusetts Institute of Technology with degrees in engineering and mathematics. Samalaulu (abbreviated) emigrated from Samoa in 1960 and studied economics at Columbia University. The Parnther family settled in Norfolk, Virginia in the late 1960s.

Anthony graduated from E.C. Glass High School in Lynchburg, Virginia, where he played the cello, bassoon, and tuba in the instrumental music department.

== Education ==
Anthony attended East Tennessee State University in Johnson City, Tennessee. He studied conducting at Yale University and music performance at Northwestern University. At Yale University, he studied conducting with Lawrence Leighton Smith.

== Career ==
After a two-year international search, the San Bernardino Symphony appointed Anthony Parnther as their Music Director in May 2019.

Parnther currently serves as conductor of the Southeast Symphony in Los Angeles, California. Previously, he conducted the Orange County Symphony in Anaheim, California and the Inland Valley Symphony (now the Temecula Valley Symphony) in Temecula, California. He works as a conductor, orchestrator, and bassoonist with the Hollywood Studio Symphony for television, motion pictures, and video games.

=== Guest conducting ===
Anthony has appeared with many of the leading orchestras in North America, including the New York Philharmonic, Chicago Symphony Orchestra, The Cleveland Orchestra, Philadelphia Orchestra, Cincinnati Symphony, Los Angeles Philharmonic, Atlanta Symphony Orchestra, San Francisco Symphony, Detroit Symphony, Baltimore Symphony, National Symphony Orchestra, Rochester Philharmonic, Calgary Philharmonic Orchestra, Los Angeles Opera, Houston Symphony, Pittsburgh Symphony, St. Louis Symphony, Indianapolis Symphony, San Diego Symphony, Vancouver Symphony, and the Buffalo Philharmonic.

In 2018, Parnther conducted Chineke! following the 30-month refurbishment of the Queen Elizabeth Hall, and again in September 2023 at the BBC Proms.

=== Film scores ===
Parnther is a conductor and bassoons of scoring sessions for motion picture, television, album, and video game scores with the Hollywood Studio Symphony.

He has led the recording sessions for such projects as Avatar: The Way of Water, Black Panther: Wakanda Forever, Encanto, The Mandalorian, The Book of Boba Fett, Nope, League of Legends, Creed III, Devotion, Tenet, Ghostbusters: Afterlife, American Dad, Arcane, The Adam Project, Slumberland, Star Trek Beyond, The Way Back, Cheaper By The Dozen, Lost City, Little, The Hunt, Turning Red, Ice Age: Adventures of Buck Wild, Diary of a Wimpy Kid: Rodrick Rules, Fargo, The Night Of, 4400, The Lamplighters League, Guild Wars, Oppenheimer, Zootopia 2, and many more.

=== Teaching ===
Anthony directed the Symphonic Band and directed and designed for the Marching Buccaneers and the Men and Women's Basketball Pep Bands at East Tennessee State University from 2004 to 2007. He taught applied double reeds at Fullerton College from 2008 to 2010 and served as director of the YMP/YMCO program under the Department of Equity and Inclusion at University of California, Berkeley from 2010 to 2015. He was Artist-in-residence at the Oakwood School in North Hollywood from 2015 to 2017.

== Collaborations ==
He has collaborated with music composers such as Ludwig Göransson, Hans Zimmer, John Williams, Danny Elfman, Michael Giacchino, John Powell, Germaine Franco, Simon Franglen, Pinar Toprak, John Paesano, Steve Jablonsky, Mark Mancina, Mark Mothersbaugh, Heitor Pereira, Henry Jackman, Dominic Lewis, Rob Simonsen, Marco Beltrami, Chanda Dancy, and Rupert Gregson-Williams.

== Filmography ==
=== Film ===
Year	Title	Role	Director (s)	Composer (s)	Notes
2015	Goosebumps	Bassoon	Rob Letterman	Danny Elfman	First collaboration with Elfman
2015	The Good Dinosaur	Bassoon	Peter Sohn	Mychael Danna; Jeff Danna	First collaboration with Danna
2016	X-Men: Apocalypse	Bassoon	Bryan Singer	John Ottman	
2016	The Conjuring 2	Bassoon	James Wan	Joseph Bishara	
2016	Ghostbusters	Bassoon	Paul Feig	Theodore Shapiro	
2016	Star Trek Beyond	Bassoon	Justin Lin	Michael Giacchino	First collaboration with Giacchino
2016	Moana	Bassoon	John Musker; Ron Clements	Mark Mancina	First collaboration with Mancina
2016	Rogue One	Bassoon	Gareth Edwards	Michael Giacchino	Second Collaboration with Giacchino
2017	Lady Bird	Bassoon	Greta Gerwig	Jon Brion	
2017	Ferdinand	Bassoon	Carlos Saldanha	John Powell	First collaboration with Powell
2018	BlacKkKlansman	Bassoon	Spike Lee	Terrence Blanchard	First collaboration with Blanchard
2018	Under the Silver Lake	Bassoon	David Robert Mitchell	Disasterpeace	
2018	The Nun	Bassoon	Corin Hardy	Abel Korzeniowski	
2018	Aquaman	Bassoon	James Wan	Rupert Gregson-Williams	
2019	The Lego Movie 2: The Second Part	Bassoon	Mike Mitchell	Mark Mothersbaugh	First collaboration with Mothersbaugh
2019	Little	Conductor	Tina Gordon	Germaine Franco	First collaboration with Franco
2019	The Lion King	Bassoon	Jon Favreau	Hans Zimmer	First collaboration with Zimmer
2019	The Addams Family	Bassoon	Greg Tiernan; Conrad Vernon	Mychael Danna; Jeff Danna	Second collaboration with Danna
2019	Doctor Sleep	Bassoon	Mike Flanagan	The Newton Brothers	
2019	Togo	Bassoon	Ericson Core	Mark Isham	First collaboration with Isham
2020	A Quiet Place Part II	Bassoon	John Krasinski	Marco Beltrami	First collaboration with Beltrami
2020	Da 5 Bloods	Bassoon	Spike Lee	Terrence Blanchard	Second collaboration with Blanchard
2020	Tenet	Conductor	Christopher Nolan	Ludwig Göransson	First Collaboration with Göransson
2020	Mulan	Bassoon	Niki Caro	Harry Gregson-Williams	
2020	Mank	Bassoon	David Fincher	Trent Reznor; Atticus Ross	
2020	The SpongeBob Movie: Sponge on the Run	Bassoon	Tim Hill	Hans Zimmer	Second collaboration with Zimmer
2021	Coming 2 America	Bassoon	Craig Brewer	Jermaine Stegall	
2021	The Conjuring: The Devil Made Me Do It	Bassoon	Michael Chaves	Joseph Bishara	
2021	Space Jam: A New Legacy	Bassoon	Malcolm D. Lee	Kris Bowers	
2021	The Suicide Squad	Bassoon	James Gunn	John Murphy	First collaboration with Murphy
2021	Venom: Let There Be Carnage	Bassoon	Andy Serkis	Marco Beltrami	Second collaboration with Beltrami
2021	Ghostbusters: Afterlife	Conductor / Bassoon	Jason Reitman	Rob Simonsen	First collaboration with Simonsen
2021	Red Notice	Bassoon	Rawson Marshall Thurber	Steve Jablonsky	First collaboration with Jablonsky
2021	Encanto	Conductor	Jared Bush; Byron Howard	Germaine Franco	Second collaboration with Franco
2022	iMordecai	Musician	Marvin Samel	Matthew Kajcienski	
2022	The Ice Age Adventures of Buck Wild	Conductor	John C. Donkin	Batu Sener	
2022	The Adam Project	Conductor	Shawn Levy	Rob Simonsen	Second collaboration with Simonsen.
2022	Turning Red	Conductor	Domee Shi	Ludwig Göransson	Second collaboration with Göransson
2022	The Lost City	Conductor	Aaron Nee; Adam Nee	Pinar Toprak	First collaboration with Toprak
2022	The Bubble	Orchestra	Judd Apatow	Michael Andrews; Andrew Bird	
2022	Full of Grace	Fagot	Roberto Bueso	Vicente Ortiz Gimeno	
2022	Sonic the Hedgehog 2	Bassoon	Jeff Fowler	Tom Holkenborg	
2022	Lightyear	Bassoon	Angus MacLane	Michael Giacchino	Third collaboration with Giacchino
2022	Minions: The Rise of Gru	Bassoon	Kyle Balda	Heitor Pereira	First collaboration with Pereira
2022	Nope	Conductor	Jordan Peele	Michael Abels	
2022	DC League of Super-Pets	Bassoon	Jared Stern	Steve Jablonsky	Second collaboration with Jablonsky
2022	Prey	Bassoon	Dan Trachtenberg	Sarah Schachner	
2022	Bullet Train	Bassoon	David Leitch	Dominic Lewis	First collaboration with Lewis
2022	Black Panther: Wakanda Forever	Conductor	Ryan Coogler	Ludwig Göransson	Third collaboration with Göransson
2022	Disenchanted	Bassoon	Adam Shankman	Alan Menken	
2022	Devotion	Conductor	J. D. Dillard	Chanda Dancy	
2022	Strange World	Additional Conductor / Bassoon	Don Hall	Henry Jackman	First collaboration with Jackman
2022	Violent Night	Conductor	Tommy Wirkola	Dominic Lewis	Second collaboration with Lewis
2022	Diary of a Wimpy Kid: Rodrick Rules	Conductor	Luke Cormican	John Paesano	First and second collaborations with Paesano
2022	Night at the Museum: Kahmunrah Rises Again	Conductor	Matt Danner	John Paesano	First and second collaborations with Paesano
2022	Avatar: The Way of Water	Conductor	James Cameron	Simon Franglen	First collaboration with Franglen
2022	Shotgun Wedding	Conductor	Jason Moore	Pinar Toprak	Second collaboration with Toprak
2023	Creed III	Conductor	Michael B. Jordan	Joseph Shirley	
2023	Dungeons & Dragons: Honor Among Thieves	Bassoon	Jonathan Goldstein; John Francis Daley	Lorne Balfe	
2023	The Super Mario Bros. Movie	Bassoon	Aaron Horvath; Michael Jelenic	Brian Tyler	
2023	Peter Pan & Wendy	Conductor	David Lowery	Daniel Hart	
2023	Guardians of the Galaxy Vol. 3	Conductor	James Gunn	John Murphy	Second collaboration with Murphy
2023	Shooting Stars	Bassoon	Chris Robinson	Mark Isham	Second collaboration with Isham
2023	Transformers: Rise of the Beasts	Conductor	Steven Caple Jr.	Jongnic Bontemps	
2023	Indiana Jones and the Dial of Destiny	Bassoon	James Mangold	John Williams	First collaboration with Williams
2023	Oppenheimer	Conductor	Christopher Nolan	Ludwig Göransson	Fourth collaboration with Göransson
2023	Paw Patrol: The Mighty Movie	Conductor	Cal Brunker	Pinar Toprak	Third collaboration with Toprak
2023	Under the Boardwalk	Bassoon	David Soren	John Debney; Jonathan Sadoff; Sean Douglas	
2023	Quiz Lady	Conductor	Jessica Yu	Nick Urata	
2023	Wish	Woodwinds	Chris Buck; Fawn Veerasunthorn	Dave Metzger; Julia Michaels; Benjamin Rice	
2023	Diary of a Wimpy Kid Christmas: Cabin Fever	Conductor	Luke Cormican	John Paesano	Third collaboration with Paesano
2023	Leave the World Behind	Conductor	Sam Esmail	Mac Quayle	
2024	Ghostbusters: Frozen Empire	Bassoon	Gil Kenan	Dario Marianelli	
2024	Despicable Me 4	Bassoon	Chris Renaud	Heitor Pereira	Second collaboration with Pereira
2024	Beetlejuice Beetlejuice	Bassoon	Tim Burton	Danny Elfman	Second collaboration with Elfman
2024	Joker: Folie À Deux	Bassoon	Todd Phillips	Hildur Guðnadóttir	
2024	Moana 2	Bassoon	Jason Hand; Dana Ledoux Miller; David Derrick Jr.	Mark Mancina	Second collaboration with Mancina
2024	Dear Santa	Bassoon	Bobby Farrelly	Rupert Gregson-Williams	Second collaboration with Williams
2025	Love Hurts	Conductor	Jonathan Eusebio	Dominic Lewis	Third collaboration with Lewis
2025	The Day the Earth Blew Up	Conductor	Peter Browngardt	Joshua Moshier	
2025	Sinners	Conductor	Ryan Coogler	Ludwig Göransson	Fifth collaboration with Göransson
2025	Elio	Conductor	Madeline Sharafian; Domee Shi; Adrian Molina	Rob Simonsen	Third collaboration with Simonsen
2025	Smurfs	Bassoon	Chris Miller	Henry Jackman	Second collaboration with Jackman
2025	I Know What You Did Last Summer	Conductor	Jennifer Kaytin Robinson	Chanda Dancy	First and second collaborations with Dancy
2025	Swiped	Conductor	Rachel Lee Goldenberg	Chanda Dancy	First and second collaborations with Dancy
2025	Wicked: For Good	Bass Vocals	Jon M. Chu	John Powell	Second collaboration with Powell
2025	Zootopia 2	Bassoon	Jared Bush; Byron Howard	Michael Giacchino	Fourth collaboration with Giacchino
2025	Ella McCay	Conductor	James L. Brooks	Hans Zimmer	Third collaboration with Zimmer
2025	Avatar: Fire and Ash	Conductor	James Cameron	Simon Franglen	Second collaboration with Franglen
2026	People We Meet on Vacation	Woodwinds	Brett Haley	Keegan DeWitt	
2026	The Mandalorian and Grogu	Conductor	Jon Favreau	Ludwig Göransson	Sixth collaboraiton with Göransson
2026	Disclosure Day	Bassoon	Steven Spielberg	John Williams	Second collaboration with Williams
2026	Toy Story 5	Bassoon	Andrew Stanton	Randy Newman	
2026	Minions & Monsters	Conductor	Pierre Coffin	John Powell	Third collaboration with Powell
2026	Moana	Bassoon	Thomas Kail	Mark Mancina	Third collaboration with Mancina
2026	Avatar Aang: The Last Airbender	Conductor	Lauren Montgomery	Jeremy Zuckerman	First collaboration with Zuckerman. Conducted with Joey Newman
