= Pretty Dead =

- Directed by: Benjamin Wilkins
- Written by: Benjamin Wilkins
- Produced by: Joseph Cook; Jon Michael Kondrath; Benjamin Wilkins
- Starring: Carly Oates; Ryan Shogren; Quantae Love; Emily Button
- Cinematography: Joshua Grote
- Edited by: Joe Cook; Benjamin Wilkins
- Music by: Chanda Dancy
- Production companies: Dangerously Low Productions; ReKon Productions
- Distributed by: Gravitas Ventures
- Release date: 1 August 2013
- Running time: 77 minutes
- Country: United States
- Language: English

Pretty Dead is a 2013 American found footage horror film written and directed by Benjamin Wilkins, starring Carly Oates, Ryan Shogren, Quantae Love and Emily Button.

== Cast ==
- Carly Oates as Regina Stevens
- Ryan Shogren as Ryan
- Quantae Love as Dr. Daniel Romera
- Emily Button as Nurse Boyle
- Dave Matos as Joe
- Heather Wood as Cooper
- Daesha Lynn as Virginia
- Robert Keniston as Detective
- Ernesto Trinidad as CDC Official
- Lisa Masi as Anchorwoman
- Alan J. Van Dyke as Reporter Ethan Hawley
- Kris Thordarson as Jack Stevens
- Pierce Minor as Medical Examiner
- Christie De Shong as Karaoke Manager
- Allison Gabriel as Mary Stevens
- Cody Davis as Prison Guard
- Nicole Amber Pedroza as Nicole
- Jesse Michael Pedroza Jr. as Jesse

== Reception ==
Andrew Manseau of JoBlo.com gave the film a score of 8/10 and praised Oates' "transcendant and a real star maker" performance, calling it a "serious, tour-de-force performance that absolutely sells the film." Manseau described the relationship between Regina and Ryan as "completely believable and very real" and wrote that while the effects "aren’t great", they are "certainly creative at times and will likely win you over." Scott Hallam of Dread Central rated the film 4 stars out of 5 and called it an "intelligent, unique and completely enthralling film that looks at the undead from an entirely new angle." John Noonan of HorrorNews.net opined that the "behavior and logic of the characters mitigates some of the desire to be invested in them when the worst begins to happen."
