= Chanda Dancy =

American film composer

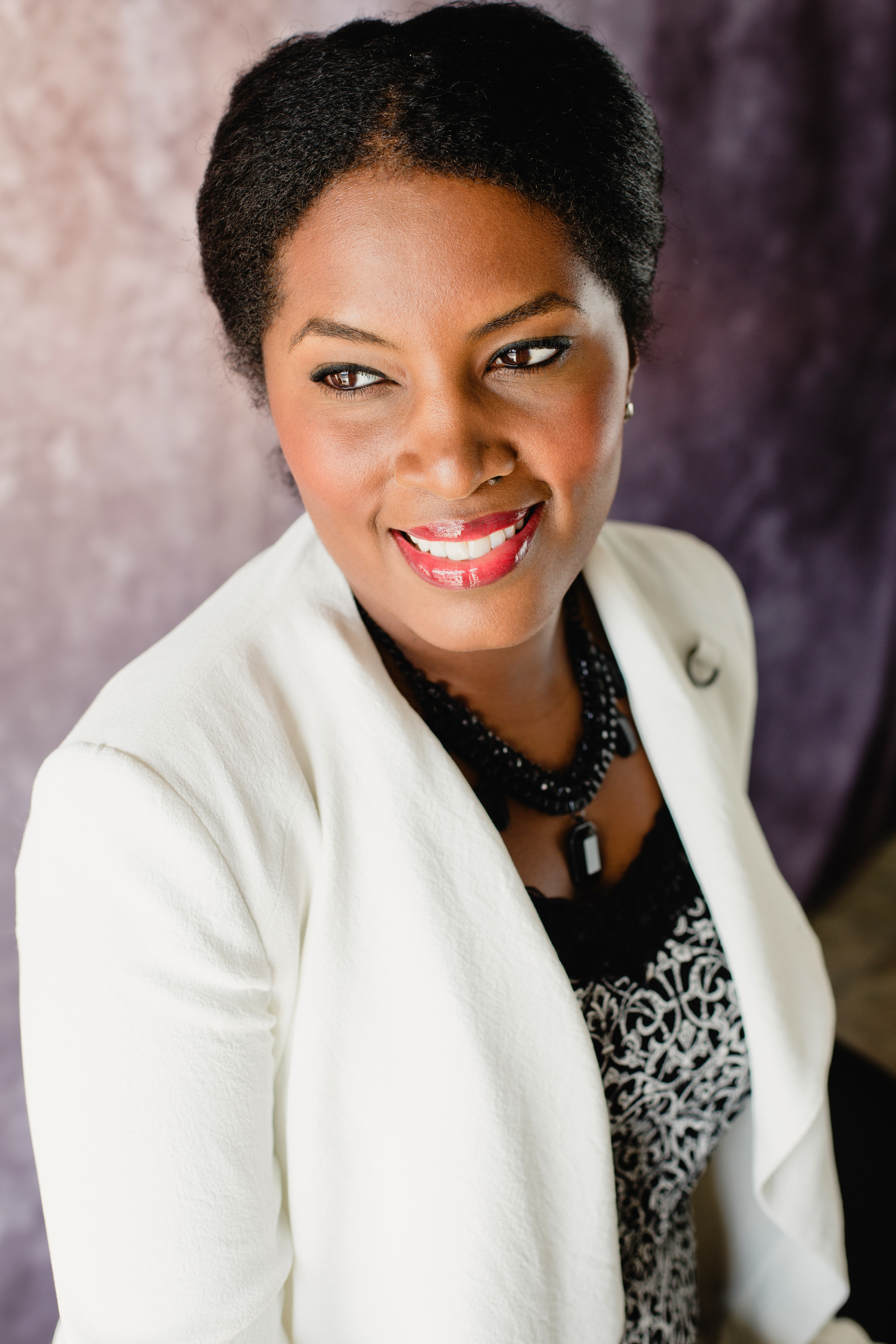
- Dancy in 2014

Background information
- Also known as: Chanda Y. Dancy
- Born: Chanda Yvette Dancy; November 14, 1978 (age 47)
- Origin: Cleveland, Ohio, United States
- Genres: Classical, rock, film
- Occupations: film, television and classical concert composer
- Years active: 2002–present
- Labels: CYD Music (2005–present)
- Website: http://www.chandadancy.com

Chanda Yvette Dancy (born November 14, 1978) is an American film and television composer, and classical concert composer.

In 2022, Dancy's score for the 2022 film Devotion was shortlisted by the Academy of Motion Picture Arts and Sciences for Best Original Score for the 95th Academy Awards.

In 2024, Dancy's score for the Paramount+ miniseries Lawmen: Bass Reeves was nominated for Outstanding Original Title Sequence for a Television Production for the 2024 Society of Composers and Lyricists Awards.

Arts Boston named Dancy one of "10 Contemporary Black Composers You Should Know" in 2018, and Dancy has "quickly [been] gaining recognition as a foremost black American contemporary composer" (Anthony Parnther, Conductor, San Bernardino Symphony).

== Early life ==
Raised in Houston, Texas, Dancy was taught piano at the age of 3 by her mother's mother, who was a classical musician, composer, and opera singer.

Dancy first learned violin in the third grade, and started composing orchestral works at the age of 12.

== Education ==
Dancy received her Bachelor of Arts in Music from Houston Baptist University and is a 2004 alumnus of USC's Program for Advanced Studies in Scoring for Film and Television.

In 2002, Dancy was a recipient of the 2002 BMI Pete Carpenter Film Scoring Fellowship. Directly after undergrad, she interned for Grammy-winning composer Mike Post.

Dancy was a scholarship composer at the 2003 Henry Mancini Institute, and was honored with the Henry Mancini Award from the ASCAP Foundation for Composition.

In 2004, Associated Production Music and the Young Musicians Foundation awarded their first APM/YMF Film and TV Music Business Fellowship Award to Dancy where she was honored alongside film composer John Williams.

Dancy is a Fellow of the 2009 Sundance Film Composers Lab.

== Advocacy ==
Dancy is on the board of the Alliance For Women Film Composers, and is a member of the Composers Diversity Collective.

Dancy is also an advisory board member of the Christophe Beck/SEASAC Reel Change: The Fund for Diversity in Film Scoring Initiative, which awards grants to underrepresented composers in film scoring.

Berklee College of Music in April 2023 hosted Dancy as a member of a panel of composers and musicians, including Hildur Guðnadóttir, Stephanie Economou, Nami Melumad, and Dara Taylor, on the occasion of Inaugural EA Day, celebrating women in the screen scoring industry.

== Career ==
=== Film and television composing ===
Dancy began scoring short films in 2004. For about 10 years, she wrote music for her friends' student films and short films, then their first features.

==== Short films ====
In 2004, Dancy scored director Mari Okada's short film "The Correct Use of Oranges" which was screened at Centre Pompidou in France.

In 2008, Dancy scored the EC award-winning short film, "Watchtower".

The 2008 short film "A Thousand Words" was scored by Dancy, who was praised by director Ted Chung as being a "phenomenal composer". The film was featured as a Vimeo Official Festival Selection, as part of Pangea Day Films, and was profiled by Wong Fu Productions.

In 2012, HuffPost praised Dancy's "rich musical score" in director Michael Shu's short film, "Unmentionables".

In 2016, Dancy scored director Jonathan Wysocki's short film "A Doll's Eyes", which won the Cinephile Award at the Busan International Short Film Festival and was nominated for the Iris Prize Award.

==== TV and miniseries composing ====
===== The Defeated =====
Dancy scored Netflix's limited series "The Defeated" in 2020. The producers requested an epic orchestral score with modern elements such as synths and sound design to create a dark, seedy, backdrop for the series.

Dancy told Variety Magazine that scoring "The Defeated" was a "proving ground", writing over 4 hours of music in 6 weeks, and recording the score with an 85-piece orchestra in Prague over a period of 8 days.

Dancy told the Alliance For Women Film Composers that a big producer discovered her music on Spotify, eventually leading to her getting hired for "The Defeated" which turned out to be a catalyst in taking her career to another level.

===== Lawmen: Bass Reeves =====
In 2023, Dancy scored the Paramount+ miniseries "Lawmen: Bass Reeves", which was Paramount+ most-watched series premiere in the year 2023.

Dancy's 8-episode score for the Taylor Sheridan-produced series was digitally released by Lakeshore Records on November 10, 2023.

The score was nominated for Outstanding Original Title Sequence for a Television Production for the 2024 Society of Composers and Lyricists Awards.

Paste Magazine said of Dancy's score "There's an inherent melancholy here, underlined by Chanda Dancy's elegiac score, that often defines Westerns of the best kind".

The Digital Fix called Dancy's score "chilling and unusual" and Geekstronomy called the score "poignant", stating it "creates a thrilling and emotional backdrop".

==== Feature film composing ====
===== Everything Before Us =====
In 2015, Dancy scored YouTube outfit Wong Fu Productions' debut feature film "Everything Before Us". The film, which featured actor Randall Park debuted at the LA Asian Pacific Film Festival, and was profiled by The Hollywood Reporter and Deadline.

===== Dramarama =====
In 2020, Dancy scored director Jonathan Wysocki's film "Dramarama", which was profiled in HuffPost. Dancy's band Modern Time Machines was also featured on the film's soundtrack. "Dramarama" premiered at the San Francisco International Film Festival and Outfest 2020, and won numerous awards including the Jury Award Best Comedy Feature at Woods Hole Film Festival and Best LGBTQIA+ Feature at Oxford Film Festival.

===== Devotion =====
In 2022, Dancy's Oscar-shortlisted score for the Sony Pictures film "Devotion", was released by Lakeshore Records.

Dancy's score for "Devotion" was recorded in Nashville over the course of eight days with 109 musicians.

To enable recording different sections, and to do orchestral sound effects, Dancy recorded strings and woodwinds separately, then brass, then percussion and finally choir. Dancy also composed big-band jazz for the film.

Variety writer Jon Burlingame stated that Dancy's "classical training comes to the fore with sophisticated compositional techniques; Dancy's score...is among [the film's] biggest assets: a work for massive orchestra (and, briefly, choir) that underlines the thrill of flight, the dangers of war, and the close emotional ties forged between fellow airmen along with their families waiting back home."

AOL.com praised Dancy's score as "epic". Devotion actor Glen Powell lobbied for Dancy's Oscar nomination, stating that "Her score added so much dimension to our film, and even incorporated the sounds of planes recorded in an old church".

In November 2022, "Devotion" actor/songwriter Joe Jonas along with Dancy were interviewed by BMI about their musical contributions to "Devotion".

Jonas and Dancy did a Q&A about their musical contributions to the film, at a screening discussion moderated by Variety's Angelique Jackson at the SCL.

===== I Wanna Dance with Somebody =====
In 2022, Dancy scored the Sony Pictures biopic "Whitney Houston: I Wanna Dance With Somebody", directed by Kasi Lemmons.

The film became the most popular movie on Netflix in April, 2023.

In December, 2022, Dancy promoted the film on Variety Magazine's Composer Roundatable (moderated by Jon Burlingame) as part of the Music for Screens Summit panel presented by BMI, alongside Oscar-nominated and Grammy and Emmy-winning composers including Terence Blanchard and Nicholas Britell.

===== Blink Twice =====
In 2024, Dancy scored Zoë Kravitz's directorial debut "Blink Twice" released by Amazon MGM Studios through Metro-Goldwyn-Mayer Pictures. Dancy's score was shortlisted for Best Original Score at the 97th Academy Awards.

Dancy and Kravitz collaborated by sending each other clips of sounds they would hear in the wild, and had a number of inspirations ranging from gagaku to Igor Stravinsky's compositions to Indonesian drumming to the theme song from Fantasy Island. The soundtrack album was released digitally on August 23, 2024, through Lakeshore Records, with its first two tracks released by ComingSoon.net the previous day.

===== One of Them Days =====
In 2025, Dancy scored the Sony Pictures buddy comedy film "One of Them Days", directed by Lawrence Lamont, written by Syreeta Singleton, starring Keke Palmer and SZA (in her film debut). The original motion picture soundtrack was released by Madison Gate Records.

===== I Know What You Did Last Summer (2025) =====
In 2025, Dancy scored the Columbia Pictures slasher franchise film "I Know What You Did Last Summer", directed by Jennifer Kaytin Robinson. It is the fourth installment in the I Know What You Did Last Summer franchise and a sequel to I Still Know What You Did Last Summer (1998).

The original motion picture soundtrack was released by Milan Records, a label of Sony Music Entertainment.

===== Swiped =====
In 2025, Dancy scored the American biopic "Swiped" written and directed by Rachel Lee Goldenberg. Based on Whitney Wolfe Herd, founder and CEO of Bumble, it stars Lily James as Herd. The original motion picture soundtrack was released by Hollywood Records.

The film had its world premiere in the Gala Presentations section of the 2025 Toronto International Film Festival on September 9, 2025, and was released in the United States on Hulu and internationally on Disney+ on September 19, 2025.

==== Documentary film composing ====
===== On These Grounds =====
In 2021, Dancy scored Garrett Zevgetis' SXSW 2021-premiering documentary film, "On These Grounds", which received praise from The Guardian, and the International Documentary Association.

===== Aftershock =====
In 2022, Dancy scored the documentary film, Aftershock, directed by Paula Eiselt and Tonya Lewis Lee. The Emmy-nominated, Peabody Award-winning film also won the Special Jury Award: Impact for Change at the 2022 Sundance Film Festival and was profiled by The New York Times.

=== Orchestral composing ===
==== Centrifuge: Or The Powers That Separate Us ====
In 2016, Dancy had an orchestral work commissioned by the Southeast Symphony entitled "Centrifuge: Or The Powers That Separate Us" which had its premiere conducted by Anthony Parnther at Shatto Chapel in Los Angeles.

OrchestraOneNYC.org said that the work "contains all the character and twists and turns that her music for film contains". The work was in part inspired by the recent Women's March.

==== Impermanence ====
In 2021, Anthony Parnther commissioned Dancy's work entitled "Impermanence" to pay tribute to loved ones lost during the pandemic. Dancy's work had its premiere in October 2021 by the San Bernardino Symphony at the California Theatre.

==== Cacophony of Spirits ====
In December 2023, the Atlanta Symphony Orchestra commissioned Dancy to write the 11-minute concert work four-section "Cacophony of Spirits: A Cinematic Tone Poem", which had its world premiere at a performance conducted by Anthony Parnther.

The work is "composed as a theme and variation in four continuous parts: Joy/Wonder, Fear/Suffering, Rage/Destruction, Sorrow/Acceptance."

ArtsATL called Cacophony of Spirits "compelling" ^{64}, and added "Chanda Dancy's commissioned work for the ASO showed she is a concert hall composer on the rise."

EarRelevant.net said "[Dancy's] piece hearkens to stylistic elements drawn from Stravinsky, Prokofiev, and a handful of 1940s Americana composers"

=== Collaboration with bands ===
Dancy is a member of Los Angeles shoegaze band Modern Time Machines. Dancy performed in the band's 2011 music video "Mammoth" alongside Death Valley Girls and Frankie and the Witch Fingers bassist Nicole Smith and toured SXSW with the band in 2011.

Dancy's song "Dweeb" with Modern Time Machines was voted #1 on Kat Corbett's KROQ 106.7FM radio show in Los Angeles in May and October, 2010.

Dancy's song "Mammoth" with Modern Time Machines was performed live with Dancy playing violin on the premiere episode of The Eric Andre Show television program on Adult Swim in 2012, with Modern Time Machines performing simultaneously with the hardcore band Retaliate.

Vice Magazine in 2014 ranked the band's performance with Dancy as the "coolest" musical guest performance in the Eric Andre Show series, and The A.V. Club in 2023 called the performance "a welcome, entertaining, and strangely captivating cacophony".

Dancy performed live alongside The Smashing Pumpkins' bassist Nicole Fiorentino as a member of the Los Angeles band Light FM at their 2009 residency at Spaceland and she performed live with Los Angeles band The Robotanists at the Troubador in 2011.

Dancy also recorded alongside Silversun Pickups keyboardist Joe Lester and Gary Numan drummer Jimmy Lucido on the 2013 album "High In the Lasers" by Los Angeles band Nightmare Air.

== Influences ==
Dancy spoke to the Los Angeles Times in 2022 about her appreciation for traditional film scores with orchestras, as well as scores built on guitars and other non-orchestral instruments.

Dancy has named influences ranging from John Williams, Tchaikovsky, Béla Bartók, Dmitri Shostakovich, Antonín Dvořák, Krzysztof Penderecki, Joe Hisaishi, Arvo Pärt, Duke Ellington, Gunther Schuller, and Vince Mendoza, as well as EDM, R&B, Jazz, and experimental/sound design elements on top of the traditional European classical orchestra.

Dancy also cites anime scores as influences, such as scores by Yoko Kanno for Macross Plus and Cowboy Bebop, and video game scores such as Nobuo Uematsu's scores for Final Fantasy. Dancy also cites rock influences from the band Modern Time Machines' "ethereal swirling mass of guitar sound".
