= Dramarama (disambiguation) =

Dramarama is an alternative rock band.

Dramarama may also refer to:

- Dramarama (TV series), a 1980s British television series
- Dramarama (2001 film), an Icelandic anthology film
- Dramarama (2020 film), an American film
- "Dramarama", a 2017 song by K-pop boy group Monsta X
- Total DramaRama, a Canadian/American animated television series
