= Paris Lenon =

American football player (born 1977)

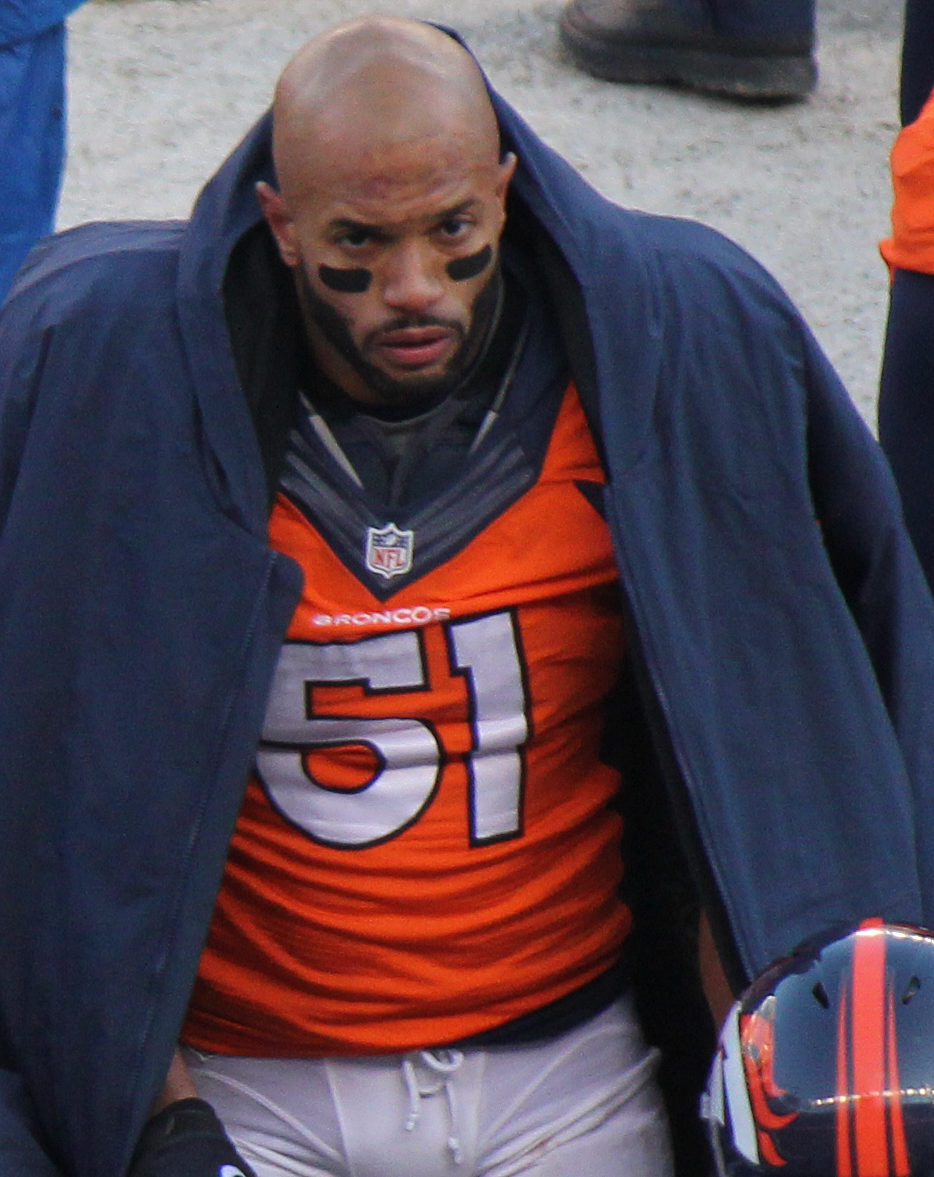
- Lenon in 2013

No. 46, 53, 51
- Position: Linebacker

Personal information
- Born: November 26, 1977 (age 48); Lynchburg, Virginia, U.S.
- Listed height: 6 ft 2 in (1.88 m)
- Listed weight: 240 lb (109 kg)

Career information
- High school: Heritage (Lynchburg)
- College: Richmond (1996–1999)
- NFL draft: 2000: undrafted

Career history
- Carolina Panthers (2000)*; Memphis Maniax (2001); Green Bay Packers (2001)*; Seattle Seahawks (2001)*; Green Bay Packers (2001−2005); Amsterdam Admirals (2002); Detroit Lions (2006−2008); New England Patriots (2009)*; St. Louis Rams (2009); Arizona Cardinals (2010−2012); Denver Broncos (2013)
- * Offseason or practice squad member only

Awards and highlights
- First-team All-Atlantic 10 Conference (1998)

Career NFL statistics
- Total tackles: 833
- Sacks: 12
- Forced fumbles: 10
- Pass deflections: 31
- Interceptions: 5
- Defensive touchdowns: 1
- Stats at Pro Football Reference

Paris Michael Lenon (born November 26, 1977) is an American former professional football player who was a linebacker in the National Football League (NFL). He played college football for the Richmond Spiders football and was signed by the Carolina Panthers of the NFL as an undrafted free agent in the spring of 2000, then chosen by the Memphis Maniax in the XFL draft in the fall of 2000.

Lenon was a member of the Panthers, the Maniax, then the NFL's Green Bay Packers, Seattle Seahawks, Detroit Lions, New England Patriots, St. Louis Rams, and Arizona Cardinals. Lenon was the last active NFL player to have played in the XFL(2001).

== Early life ==
Lenon attended Heritage High School in Lynchburg, Virginia and won two varsity letters each in football and basketball, and one in baseball. In football, he played free safety and quarterback, and was named the Western District Defensive Player of the Year. Lenon graduated from Heritage High School in 1995.

== College career ==
Lenon attended the University of Richmond and was a four-year letterman and a three-year starter in football. As a redshirt sophomore in 1997, Lenon recorded a career-high 104 tackles. He was selected to the First-team All-Atlantic 10 Conference in 1997. He was named to the second-team All-Atlantic 10 in his senior season in 1998. He finished his college career with 45 games played, 320 tackles, 12 sacks, and four forced fumbles.

== Professional career ==
=== Carolina Panthers ===
Lenon was signed by the Carolina Panthers as an undrafted free agent following the 2000 NFL draft, but was released by the team on June 9, 2000.

=== Memphis Maniax ===
After spending the 2000 season out of football, Lenon was a member of the Memphis Maniax in the XFL's only season, 2001.

=== Green Bay Packers ===
Following the XFL's season, Lenon signed with the Green Bay Packers on April 26, 2001. He was waived by the team on July 24, 2001.

=== Seattle Seahawks ===
Lenon was signed by the Seattle Seahawks on August 16, 2001, and was waived by the team on August 27, 2001.

=== Green Bay Packers (second stint) ===
Lenon re-joined the Packers on December 27, joining their practice squad for the remainder of the regular season and the playoffs. After the season, he was allocated to the Amsterdam Admirals of NFL Europe for the spring 2002 season. In 2002, Lenon played in all 16 games for the Packers, mainly on special teams. He played in all 16 games in 2003 and 2004 for the Packers, starting four games in 2004 at linebacker. Lenon started 12 games in 2005, his final season with the Packers.

=== Detroit Lions ===
Lenon signed a three-year deal with the Detroit Lions March 22, 2006. On December 23, 2007, Lenon intercepted a pass by Brodie Croyle and returned it 61 yards for a touchdown, in a 25–20 victory over the Kansas City Chiefs. His 2007 season was his career best. He totaled 116 tackles (86 solo, 30 assisted), 2 forced fumbles and 1 interception. Lenon was also the team leader in tackles in the 2008 season, the third straight year he started all 16 games for the Lions (in spite of the fact the Lions did not win a single game that year).

=== New England Patriots ===
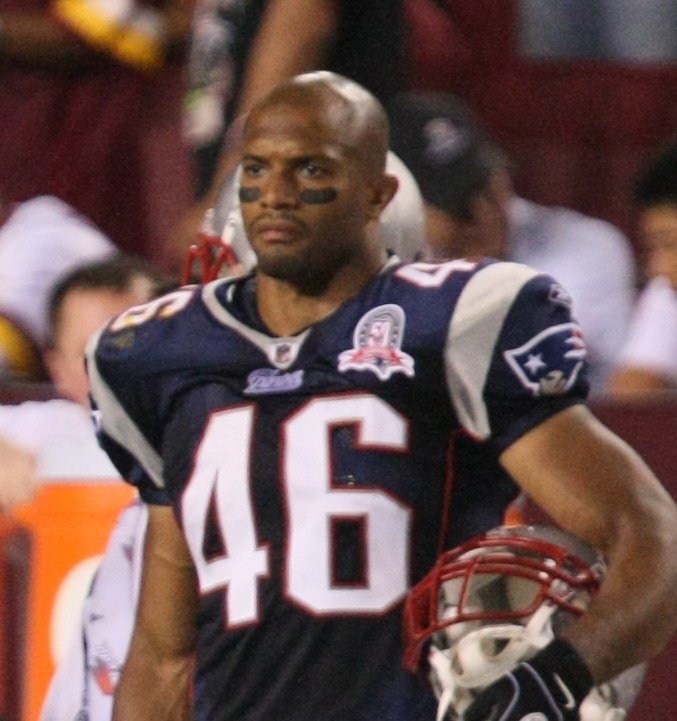
Lenon with the Patriots in August 2009

Lenon signed with the New England Patriots on May 27, 2009. He was released on September 5, 2009.

=== St. Louis Rams ===
Lenon signed with the St. Louis Rams on September 16, 2009. Lenon became the starting weak side linebacker after Will Witherspoon was traded to the Eagles. Lenon tied for the team lead with three forced fumbles.

=== Arizona Cardinals ===
Lenon signed with the Arizona Cardinals on March 15, 2010.

=== Denver Broncos ===
On August 20, 2013, Lenon was signed by the Denver Broncos. During the Broncos' 2013 season he played in 14 regular season and three postseason games, including Super Bowl XLVIII.

== NFL career statistics ==
Legend
**Bold**	Career high

=== Regular season ===
Year	Team	Games		Tackles					Interceptions					Fumbles			
Year	Team	GP	GS	Cmb	Solo	Ast	Sck	TFL	Int	Yds	TD	Lng	PD	FF	FR	Yds	TD
2002	GNB	**16**	0	22	17	5	0.0	0	0	0	0	0	0	0	1	0	0
2003	GNB	**16**	0	21	15	6	0.0	0	0	0	0	0	0	0	0	0	0
2004	GNB	**16**	4	28	20	8	0.0	0	0	0	0	0	1	0	0	0	0
2005	GNB	**16**	12	65	37	28	1.5	2	0	0	0	0	**6**	1	0	0	0
2006	DET	**16**	**16**	71	51	20	0.0	2	1	0	0	0	3	0	**2**	**10**	0
2007	DET	**16**	**16**	118	88	30	2.0	7	1	**61**	**1**	**61**	3	2	0	0	0
2008	DET	**16**	**16**	122	81	**41**	1.5	7	0	0	0	0	3	2	**2**	0	0
2009	STL	15	10	42	35	7	0.0	3	0	0	0	0	1	**3**	0	0	0
2010	ARI	**16**	**16**	**125**	**94**	31	2.0	**12**	**2**	12	0	10	**6**	1	0	0	0
2011	ARI	**16**	**16**	93	64	29	**3.0**	5	0	0	0	0	3	0	1	0	0
2012	ARI	**16**	**16**	104	74	30	2.0	3	1	0	0	0	3	1	1	0	0
2013	DEN	14	6	22	16	6	0.0	0	0	0	0	0	2	0	0	0	0
		189	128	833	592	241	12.0	41	5	73	1	61	31	10	7	10	0

=== Playoffs ===
Year	Team	Games		Tackles					Interceptions					Fumbles			
Year	Team	GP	GS	Cmb	Solo	Ast	Sck	TFL	Int	Yds	TD	Lng	PD	FF	FR	Yds	TD
2002	GNB	1	0	0	0	0	0.0	0	0	0	0	0	0	0	0	0	0
2003	GNB	2	0	2	2	0	0.0	0	0	0	0	0	0	0	0	0	0
2004	GNB	1	0	3	3	0	0.0	0	0	0	0	0	0	0	0	0	0
2013	DEN	**3**	**3**	**4**	**4**	0	0.0	0	0	0	0	0	0	0	0	0	0
		7	3	9	9	0	0.0	0	0	0	0	0	0	0	0	0	0
