= It Lives Inside =

2023 American/Canadian film by Bishal Dutta

- Theatrical release poster
- Directed by: Bishal Dutta
- Written by: Bishal Dutta
- Story by: Bishal Dutta; Ashish Mehta
- Produced by: Raymond Mansfield; Sean McKittrick
- Starring: Megan Suri; Neeru Bajwa; Mohana Krishnan; Vik Sahay; Gage Marsh; Beatrice Kitsos; Betty Gabriel
- Cinematography: Matthew Lynn
- Edited by: Jack Price
- Music by: Wesley Hughes
- Production companies: Neon; QC Entertainment; Brightlight Pictures
- Distributed by: Neon (United States); Elevation Pictures (Canada)
- Release dates: March 11, 2023 (SXSW); September 22, 2023 (United States)
- Running time: 99 minutes
- Countries: United States; Canada
- Language: English
- Box office: $7.3 million

It Lives Inside is a 2023 supernatural horror film written and directed by Bishal Dutta and starring Megan Suri, and follows Sam, an Indian-American teen trying to fit into her suburban high school by rejecting her heritage. When Sam unleashes a terrifying, ancient Indian demon that feeds on loneliness and trauma, it kidnaps her best friend Tamira and then targets Sam, forcing her to confront her identity and cultural roots to save her friend and herself. The film also stars Neeru Bajwa, Mohana Krishnan, Vik Sahay, Gage Marsh, Beatrice Kitsos and Betty Gabriel.

It Lives Inside had debuted at the 2023 South by Southwest film festival, and was released by Neon on September 22, 2023. The film received mixed reviews from critics and had grossed $7.5 million worldwide.

== Plot ==
Samidha, or "Sam", is an Indian-American high school student who has been assimilating into western society. While her mother, Poorna, is insistent that Sam continue to follow traditions and pay respect to her heritage, her father, Inesh, is less strict towards her. At school, Sam tries to reject her culture to fit in with her white friends and has a budding romance with her classmate Russ. As a result, she has grown apart from her former best friend and fellow Indian student, Tamira, who is now a social outcast for acting withdrawn and carrying a strange glass jar. This concerns their teacher, Joyce, but Sam believes Tamira is fine.

At night, Tamira feeds the jar raw meat but something inside the jar starts damaging it. The next day at school, Tamira privately approaches Sam for help, claiming that a supernatural entity from a story they were told as children actually lives in the jar and has been terrorizing her. Sam, embarrassed and frustrated by Tamira, smashes the jar open, causing Tamira to have a panic attack. When Sam leaves to get help, Tamira is attacked by an invisible entity and goes missing. Sam feels guilty and begins to fear there is something sinister going on. She recovers a notebook Tamira had in her possession containing strange Sanskrit writings.

Tamira is revealed to have been abducted and held captive by the entity, which attacks and mutilates her. Sam begins to notice a strange presence around her and takes a second look at Tamira's claims. Meanwhile, Poorna grows more frustrated by Sam's disregard for Indian traditions, especially when she skips a special prayer for Tamira to hang out with Russ. Sam and Russ go to an abandoned house that belonged to another Indian student, Karan, who died alongside his family in a supposed murder-suicide. The pair discover drawings depicting a creature on the walls. The strange phenomena escalates, unnerving Sam, while Tamira suffers from daily attacks and fails an escape attempt.

Sam and Russ visit Karan's house again where they kiss. Outside, he is attacked and killed by the entity in front of Sam. A traumatized Sam starts to lose her grip on reality and suffers from frightening nightmares. Desperate for help, she convinces Joyce to help her decipher some of the notebook's texts. Joyce identifies the texts as being about a demonic spirit known as a Pishach, which feeds off negative energy before consuming the souls of its prey. The only way to stop the Pishach is to seal it inside something like a jar. Sam asks Poorna for help, who plans to lure out the Pishach. As the pair prepare food and don traditional Indian attire, Joyce is attacked at the school and badly wounded by the entity.

Inesh arrives home, only to be attacked and injured by the Pishach. It also attacks Poorna before being warded off. Sam realizes that Tamira is being held at Karan's house and races to the property to save her. Inside, she is attacked and stalked by the entity, which reveals its true form to Sam. Sam finds Tamira and confronts the entity. Realizing she can be the vessel to hold the Pishach, Sam allows it to enter and inhabit her body.

One year later, Sam has dinner with Tamira, Joyce, Poorna and Inesh, who have all recovered. The group have managed to contain the entity by feeding Sam raw meat, much like Tamira did to the jar. Later, Sam and Tamira reconcile. As Sam assures Tamira that the Pishach will never get out, she gradually begins to look more and more worried until she starts to cry.

== Cast ==
- Megan Suri as Sam / Samidha
- Neeru Bajwa as Poorna
- Mohana Krishnan as Tamira
- Betty Gabriel as Joyce
- Vik Sahay as Inesh
- Gage Marsh as Russ
- Jenaya Ross as The Pishach

== Production ==
On October 14, 2021, Neon and QC Entertainment announced a partnership to produce a then-untitled debut feature from Dutta, starring Megan Suri, Neeru Bajwa, Vik Sahay and Betty Gabriel. Principal photography started the same day in Vancouver.

Dutta took inspiration for the film from his own childhood experience of being born in India prior to moving to North America. The story is influenced by Indian demonic mythology as well as a personal story from Dutta's grandfather. Dutta explained:

"After I moved to North America from India at the age of four, a lot of my social education came from watching American horror films. I always wondered, what were families like mine doing while Bruce the shark tore through Amity's waters, while Freddy Krueger slashed teenagers in the dreamscape, and while Jack Torrance chased his son through the maze-like halls of the Overlook? As it developed, It Lives Inside formed its own dual identity much like mine. On one hand, it is a love letter to the community and culture that raised me while on the other, it is a visceral experience that is designed to instill the same raw terror in its viewers that my favorite horror films instilled in me."

== Release ==
The film debuted at the 2023 South by Southwest film festival. It was released on September 22, 2023.

It Lives Inside was released for digital platforms on October 10, 2023, followed by a Blu-ray and DVD release on November 7, 2023.

== Reception ==
=== Box office ===
Released alongside Expend4bles in the United States and Canada, the film made $2.6 million from 2,010 theaters in its opening weekend, finishing in seventh.

=== Critical response ===
On the review aggregator website Rotten Tomatoes, 64% of 118 critics' reviews are positive, with an average rating of 6.1/10. The website's consensus reads: "Effective horror with a strong core of social commentary, It Lives Inside is an eerily compelling calling card for filmmaker Bishal Dutta in his feature-length debut." Metacritic, which uses a weighted average, assigned the film a score of 50 out of 100, based on 16 critics, indicating "mixed or average" reviews. Audiences polled PostTrak gave the film a 34% positive score, with 44% saying they would definitely recommend it.

Meagan Navarro of Bloody Disgusting gave the film a score of 3.5/5, writing, "Dutta uses a familiar framework of teen horror as an accessible introduction to underexplored mythology exacerbated by a cultural divide and adolescence. While Dutta wears his influences on his sleeves, the gnarly new demon and the complexities of its characters mark this director as one to watch." Alexandra Heller-Nicholas of the Alliance of Women Film Journalists wrote, "While on the surface It Lives Inside plays fairly conventionally with horror's familiar codes and conventions, the incorporation of Hindu folklore in a story that is fundamentally built around the immigrant experience breathes new life into the otherwise hackneyed storyline." The Hollywood Reporter's Lovia Gyarkye wrote, "The potency of It Lives Inside—and why it might be worth checking out even if it isn't wholly satisfying—lies in how it introduces Sam and Tamira's relationship and links it to Hindu lore."

Brian Tallerico of RogerEbert.com was more critical, writing, "While I appreciate the effort here and the quest for representation involving a culture that is not often seen in American horror, the execution misfires in every direction, leading to one of the most frustrating films I saw at SXSW this year. I kept actively trying to like It Lives Inside. It kept pushing me out." Slant Magazine's Derek Smith wrote, "Had the film actually delivered some genuine chills, it would be easier to look past its derivative story, hollow characterizations, and overly literal symbolism of depression and alienation", and gave it 1.5/4 stars. David Fear of Rolling Stone wrote, "while the idea of using a supernatural scary movie as a starting point for exploring the second-gen immigrant experience... is rife with possibilities, the end result here doesn't necessarily make good on the promise of that premise."
