= Lynchburg City Public Schools =

Lynchburg Virginia Public Schools

Location
- Lynchburg, Virginia United States

District information
- Type: Public
- Grades: K–12
- Established: April 5, 1871; 155 years ago
- Superintendent: Dr. Crystal M. Edwards
- Schools: Eleven elementary schools Three middle schools Two high schools
- NCES District ID: 5102340

Students and staff
- Students: over 9,000

Other information
- Website: www.lcsedu.net/ourschools

Lynchburg City Schools, also known as Lynchburg City Public Schools, is a public school district in Lynchburg, Virginia. It began operation on April 5, 1871, and is overseen by the Lynchburg City School Board.

It has over 9,000 students enrolled in preschool through adult classes in two high schools, three middle schools, and eleven elementary schools. The district also provides alternative elementary, middle and high school programs, gifted programs, and programs for the disabled.

== High schools ==
- E. C. Glass High School
- Heritage High School

== Middle schools ==
- Linkhorne Middle School
- Paul Laurence Dunbar Middle School for Innovation
- Sandusky Middle School

== Elementary schools ==
- William Marvin Bass Elementary School
- Bedford Hills Elementary School
- Dearing Elementary School for Innovation
- Heritage Elementary School
- Linkhorne Elementary School
- Paul Munro Elementary School
- Perrymont Elementary School
- Robert S. Payne Elementary School
- Sandusky Elementary School
- Sheffield Elementary School
- Thomas C. Miller Elementary School for Innovation

== Alternative education ==
- Amelia Pride Center
- Fort Hill Community School

== Special education ==
- Laurel Regional Program

== School board ==
Lynchburg schools - public and private - are managed by the nine-member Lynchburg City School Board, appointed by the Lynchburg City council, three from each of the three component districts. It oversees the public schools and the local private schools.
