= Brad Butler =

American football player (born 1983)

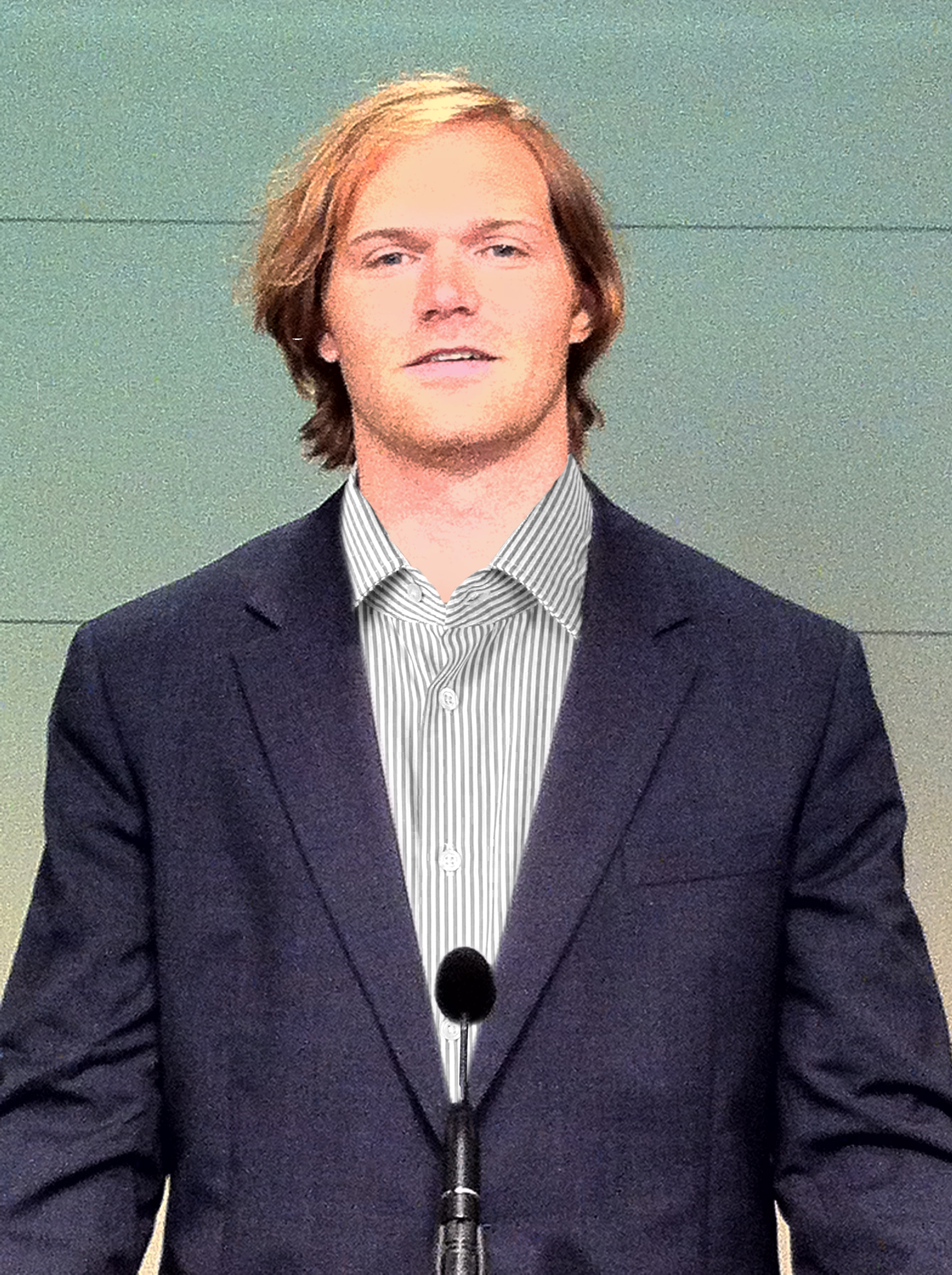
- Butler in 2011

No. 60
- Position: Offensive lineman

Personal information
- Born: September 18, 1983 (age 43); Lynchburg, Virginia, U.S.
- Listed height: 6 ft 7 in (2.01 m)
- Listed weight: 315 lb (143 kg)

Career information
- High school: E. C. Glass (Lynchburg)
- College: Virginia
- NFL draft: 2006: 5th round, 143rd overall pick

Career history
- Buffalo Bills (2006–2009)

Career NFL statistics
- Games played: 33
- Games started: 31
- Stats at Pro Football Reference

Bradley Jay Butler, Jr. (born September 18, 1983) is an American former professional football player who was a guard and tackle for the Buffalo Bills of the National Football League (NFL). He was selected by the Bills in the fifth round of the 2006 NFL draft. He played high school football at E.C. Glass High School and college football for the Virginia Cavaliers.

== College career ==
Butler is one of three Cavaliers in school history to start four consecutive bowl games. He started 31 consecutive games at right tackle, the longest streak at the University of Virginia since 1998. As a senior, Butler started all 11 games he played. Butler drew attention in 2005 when he hit Boston College defensive end Mathias Kiwanuka with a chop-block in the back of his knees several seconds after the whistle, in what is referred to as "the cheap shot heard 'round the ACC." Butler was suspended for the following game by his own team as a result of the dirty late hit. He won the Rock Weir Most Improved Player Award in 2005.

== Professional career ==
Pre-draft measurables
Height	Weight	Arm length	Hand span	20-yard shuttle	Three-cone drill
6 ft 7 1/8 in (2.01 m)	310 lb (141 kg)	33 1/2 in (0.85 m)	10 1/8 in (0.26 m)	4.75 s	7.51 s
All values from NFL Combine/Pro Day

Butler was selected by the Buffalo Bills in the fifth round of the 2006 NFL draft with the 143rd overall pick. He played in two games with the Bills in his rookie season. On September 2, 2007, he was named the starting right guard for the Bills. In 2009, Butler was voted to USA Today's All-Joe Team which honors hardworking and valuable players who are overlooked. He was limited to just two games in 2009 after sustaining a serious knee injury in Week 2 against the Tampa Bay Buccaneers. He retired from professional football after the 2009 season, stating, "My passion for education, country and community is something that I am ready to devote my full attention to. I believe the best way to pursue these spheres of interest is to step away from the game of football at this point in my life." Butler started all but two of the 33 career games he played in.
