= Dramarama (2020 film) =

- Film poster
- Directed by: Jonathan Wysocki
- Written by: Jonathan Wysocki
- Starring: Nick Pugliese; Anna Grace Barlow; Megan Suri; Danielle Kay; Zak Henri
- Cinematography: Todd Bell
- Edited by: Christine Kim
- Music by: Chanda Dancy
- Production company: Ambrosia Pictures
- Distributed by: 1091
- Release dates: April 10, 2020 (SFFILM); August 13, 2021 (United States)
- Country: United States
- Language: English

Dramarama is a 2020 American coming of age comedy drama film written and directed by Jonathan Wysocki.

== Cast ==
- Nick Pugliese as Gene
- Anna Grace Barlow as Rose
- Megan Suri as Claire
- Nico Greetham as Oscar
- Danielle Kay as Ally
- Zak Henri as JD

== Release ==
The film was screened in film festivals starting in 2020 and had a limited theatrical release in 2021.

== Reception ==
Dan Callahan of TheWrap wrote, "Dramarama is ultimately worthwhile mainly because its players are so responsive to one another and to the idea of friendship that they make large sections of the movie come alive". Julie Ann Grimm of the Santa Fe Reporter wrote, "There are some delightful yuks and moments with which we suspect everyone who was ever an adolescent can relate. Yet viewers looking for more com and less dram won't find it here". Andrew Stover of Film Threat rated the film 8/10 and wrote, "Dramarama is a quickly-paced and decidedly clever feature debut. That is in large part due to the witty script and the colorful performances. Jonathan Wysocki understands what it's like to be a theatre kid and a teenager discovering themselves".
