= The MisEducation of Bindu =

- Film poster
- Directed by: Prarthana Mohan
- Screenplay by: Prarthana Mohan; Kay Tuxford
- Produced by: John Robert Armstrong; Gloria Bradbury; Zachary Spicer; Gordon Strain
- Starring: David Arquette; Megan Suri; Priyanka Bose
- Cinematography: Dani Sanchez-Lopez
- Music by: Aaron Gilhuis
- Production companies: Pigasus Pictures; RooLALA Productions
- Distributed by: MarVista Entertainment
- Release dates: 2019 (Heartland International Film Festival); October 12, 2021 (Fuse+)
- Running time: 92 minutes
- Country: United States
- Language: English

The MisEducation of Bindu is a 2019 American independent comedy film directed by Prarthana Mohan and starring David Arquette, Megan Suri and Priyanka Bose. Mark Duplass and Jay Duplass served as executive producers.

== Cast ==
- David Arquette as Bill, Kasturi's husband and Bindu's step-father
- Megan Suri as Bindu Chaudry, Kasturi's daughter and Bill's step-daughter
- Priyanka Bose as Kasturi Chaudry, Bindu's mom and Bill's wife
- Philip Labes as Peter, Bindu's friend
- Gordon Winarick as Sam, Bindu's friend

== Production ==
Principal photography took place in Broad Ripple High School.

== Release ==
The film screened in the narrative competition at the San Diego International Film Festival.

=== Accolades ===
The film won the Indiana Spotlight Award at the 2019 Heartland International Film Festival.

Prarthana Mohan won the Chris Brinker Award given to first time directors at the San Diego International Film Festival.
