= James Guthrie (conductor) =

American symphony conductor and newspaper executive (1914–1996)

James K. Guthrie
- Born: 11 March 1914
- Died: 9 March 1996 (aged 81)
- Occupations: symphony conductor and newspaper executive

James Kelley Guthrie (March 11, 1914 – March 9, 1996) was an American symphony conductor and newspaper executive.

At the age of 15, he founded the San Bernardino Community Orchestra, which is today the San Bernardino Symphony.

In 1936, after Guthrie conducted the first performance of the Hollywood Grand Opera Association, Time magazine called him the "youngest full-fledged symphony conductor in the U. S."

He was the owner and publisher of the San Bernardino Sun newspaper from 1964 until 1979. In 1974, he established the Guthrie Music Rental Library, which rents "scores and orchestra music to thousands of schools, colleges, and orchestras (both major and new struggling orchestras) at affordable prices in order to encourage music performance." From 1964 until 1973, he was the conductor of the Riverside Symphony Orchestra in Riverside, California, later known as the Inland Empire Symphony.
