= Mickey Fitzgerald =

American football player (born 1958)

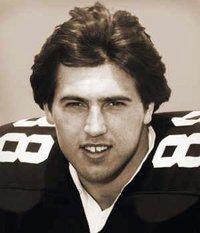

No. 48, 38
- Position: Fullback

Personal information
- Born: April 10, 1958 (age 68); Lynchburg, Virginia, U.S.
- Listed height: 6 ft 2 in (1.88 m)
- Listed weight: 235 lb (107 kg)

Career information
- High school: E. C. Glass (Lynchburg)
- College: Virginia Tech
- NFL draft: 1980: undrafted

Career history
- Atlanta Falcons (1981); Philadelphia Eagles (1981); Memphis Showboats (1984)
- Stats at Pro Football Reference

Mickey Fitzgerald (born April 10, 1957) is an American former professional football player who was a fullback in the National Football League (NFL) and United States Football League (USFL). He played college football for the Virginia Tech Hokies. Fitzgerald played in the NFL for the Atlanta Falcons and Philadelphia Eagles in 1981, and played for the Memphis Showboats of the USFL in 1984. He was inducted into the Virginia Tech Sports Hall of Fame in 2002. In 2007, he was also inducted into the Central Virginia Hall of Fame.

== Biography ==
Fitzgerald is the oldest of his three brothers. He was raised in a Catholic orphanage after his mother witnessed her lover getting shot, which made her feel that she wasn't fit to parent. Father Paul, a priest, took him and other orphanage residents to ball games. After two years in the orphanage, his grandmother took him and his siblings home. He attended E. C. Glass High School, where he played football. His athletic performance helped him secure college scholarships and he attended Virginia Tech.

After playing fullback in college at Virginia Tech, Fitzgerald was signed by the Atlanta Falcons as a free agent in 1981 and made the regular season roster after leading the team in rushing during the preseason. After playing in the season opener he was cut to make room for the Falcons to sign running back Bo Robinson. He was signed by the Philadelphia Eagles but was waived by the Eagles to make room to sign running back Booker Russell. He ended up playing one game each for the Falcons and Eagles. He later played for the Memphis Showboats in 1984. He began working in real estate and was a sumo wrestler in Japan. He has one son.
