= Megan Suri =

American actress (born 1999/2000)

- Born: March 28, 1999 (age 27)
- Occupation: Actress
- Years active: 2010–present

Megan Suri (born March 28, 1999) is an American actress known for her roles in the independent film The MisEducation of Bindu (2019) and the Netflix teen comedy series Never Have I Ever (2020–2023).

== Early life ==
Suri was born in the United States to Indian Punjabi immigrant parents. She spent two years in India as a child. She has two brothers and a sister. Her father is a former professional cricket player. Suri lives with her family in Downey, California. They own a dog.

== Career ==
Suri made her acting debut in 2010, in the romantic comedy film Valentine's Day. She subsequently appeared in the Fresh Off the Boat backdoor pilot Magic Motor Inn.

In 2019, Suri starred in the independent comedy film The MisEducation of Bindu (2019). A critic noted that "Megan Suri is perfectly cast as Bindu". From 2021 to 2023, she portrayed Aneesa Qureshi, another Indian student who goes to Devi's high school, in Never Have I Ever. One critic opined that "Megan Suri is outstanding as Aneesa".

Suri's first leading role was in the 2023 horror film It Lives Inside, which was directed by Bishal Dutta.

== Filmography ==
=== Film ===
Year	Title	Role	Notes	Ref.
2010	Valentine's Day	Rani		
2019	The MisEducation of Bindu	Bindu Chaudry		
2020	Dramarama	Claire		
2023	Missing	Veena		
2023	It Lives Inside	Samidah "Sam"		
2025	Companion	Kat		
2026	72 Hours	Caroline		

=== Television ===
Year	Title	Role	Notes	Ref.
2015	The Brink	Samira	Four episodes	
2017	Bones	Claire	Episode: "The New Tricks in the Old Dogs"	
2017	Guidance	Navi Gupta	Episode: "Dead Slut"	
2017	Future Man	Daughter	Episode: "Pilot"	
2017	Modern Family	Tardy Student	Episode: "Tough Love"	
2018-19	Atypical	Quinn	Four episodes	
2019	Speechless	Rosie	Episode: "R-O-- ROLL M-O-- MODEL"	
2019	How to Get Away with Murder	Rachael	Episode: "Vivian's Here"	
2020	Fresh Off the Boat	Simryn	Episode: "The Magic Motor Inn"	
2020	13 Reasons Why	Unknown	Episode: "College Interview"	
2021-2023	Never Have I Ever	Aneesa Qureshi	Recurring role (seasons 2-4); 17 episodes	
2021	Mira, Royal Detective	Jyoti	Episode: "The Case of the Secret Code/Mystery at the Snake Boat Races"	
2023	Poker Face	Sara	Episode: "The Night Shift"	
