= E. C. Glass High School =

Public high school in Virginia, US

Location
- 2111 Memorial Ave; Lynchburg, Virginia 24501; United States; 37°24′27.9″N 79°9′59.8″W

Information
- Type: Public high school
- Motto: Together we keep climbing
- Founded: 1871
- School district: Lynchburg City Public Schools
- Superintendent: Crystal Edwards
- Teaching staff: 82.50 (FTE)
- Grades: 9–12
- Gender: Co-educational
- Enrollment: 1,325 (2022-2023)
- Student to teacher ratio: 16.06
- Colors: Blue and White
- Athletics conference: Virginia High School League Class 4 Seminole District
- Nickname: Hilltoppers
- Team name: E.C. Glass Hilltoppers
- Rivals: Heritage High School, Brookville High School, Jefferson Forest High School
- Website: Official site

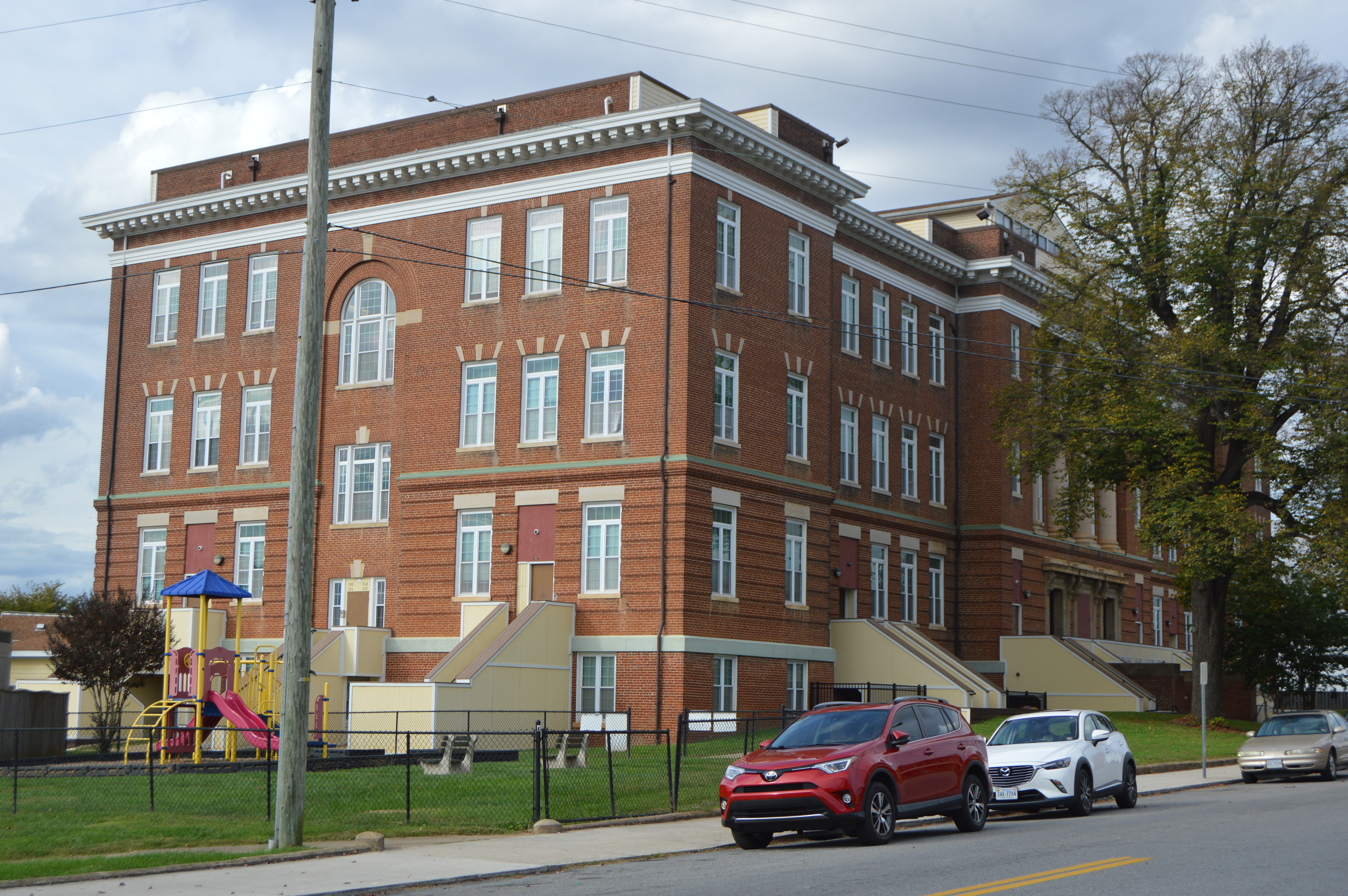
Former building on Park Avenue

E. C. Glass High School is a public school in Lynchburg, Virginia, United States, overseen by the Lynchburg City School Board. It was founded in 1871 and was named for long-time Superintendent of Public Schools in Lynchburg, Edward Christian Glass.

== Academics ==
E. C. Glass High School offers a range of Advanced Placement courses, including: AP Human Geography, AP World History, AP Research, AP American History, AP US Government, AP Comparative Government, AP African American Studies, AP Psychology, AP Physics, AP Chemistry, AP Biology, AP Environmental Science, AP Computer Science, AP Calculus AB & BC, AP Statistics, AP Latin, AP German, AP Spanish, AP French, AP English Language and Composition, AP English Literature, AP Art History, AP Music Theory, AP Macroeconomics, Microeconomics, AP European History, and AP Portfolio Art. E. C. Glass also offers a range of extra classes such as Drafting, Culinary Arts, and Personal Finance.

Some of the awards and recognition for E. C. Glass High School include:

1. US Department of Education - Blue Ribbon School 1983, 1993
2. Redbook Magazine School Award 1996
3. Newsweek Magazine, 2007 Ranked in Top Public High Schools
4. Best Comprehensive High School in Virginia

== Athletics ==
E. C. Glass High has a rich athletic tradition. Its football team competed in the Virginia High School State Championship Play-offs in 1925, 1930, 1933, 1938, 1972, 1974, 1976, 1977, 1988, 1991, 1992, and 1995, and the semi-finals game in 1993, 1994 and 2022. The Hilltoppers won the State Championship in 1930, 1933, 1938, 1988 and finished as state runners-up in 1991 and 1992. . The Hilltopper soccer team went undefeated over many seasons.

== Arts ==
In 1926, E. C. Glass High's literary magazine, Menagerie (formerly, The Critic), was the first to receive the Virginia High School League's Trophy Class award. The literary and poetry sections of the Glass yearbooks, along with other publications and media creations, have sought to help us understand ourselves better across the decades.

Glass Theatre offers a full program in acting and technical theater. Under Jim Ackley, a graduate of the Virginia Military Institute, the program won four Virginia theatre championships in the 80's and 90's. They were selected five times to perform on the Main Stage at the Educational Theatre Association National Convention and were named high school theatre champions twice by the American High School Theatre Festival. Glass Theatre represented the United States at the Edinburgh (Scotland) International Arts Festival Fringe five times where they received critical acclaim and performed to sold-out audiences. In 1991, the US Congress named the EC Glass Senior Acting Drama Class Students the winners of the “Young Writers and Inventor’s Award” for their play 'Going Toward the Light', written under Mr. Ackley’s supervision.

In 2012, Mr. Ackley retired after 32 years teaching at Glass - a record. Mr. E. Tom Harris was theater director afterwards for seven years, and was followed by EC Glass alumna and former Broadway and film actor, Allison Daugherty, in 2019.

E. C. Glass offers a full program for musicians. Glass's combined concert and chamber orchestra regularly travels to competitions and performances around the region, often selected to be in the All-Virginia Band and Orchestra event in Richmond.

Additionally, Glass has concert band, wind ensemble, percussion ensemble, and jazz band classes. The E. C. Glass Marching Band, called "The Pride of Old Dominion," performs at football games and competitions around the state. The school also has an award winning Choral Department. Ensembles and classes within the Choral Department include the Chamber Singers, Concert Choir, and Male and Female Acapella Ensemble.

In 2017, English teacher Casey Wood introduced an elective course entitled "Exploring Language and Culture Through Hip Hop". This course follows the historical timeline of classic Hip-Hop culture and allows students to analyze Rap lyrics as poetry. In 2024, E.C. Glass High School's record label, BTG (Break the Glass Productions) released their first album entitled "Break the Glass: Volume 1" which features songs written, produced and performed by students, teachers, and members of the E.C. Glass community.

== Rejection of "It Gets Better" Grant ==
In November 2023, the Lynchburg City School Board made national headlines when they voted 7-2 to throw away an already-gifted $10,000 grant awarded by the It Gets Better Project to E.C. Glass High School students who had applied for the funding to create a quiet tolerant safe space for all students. The students who applied for the grant were quoted by local news as saying the decision "broke our spirits" and that the board "made us feel like we weren’t even there."

== Notable alumni ==
- Carl Anderson (singer) – American singer, film and theater actor known for his soulful voice, his hit songs and his moving portrayal of Judas Iscariot in the Broadway and film versions of the rock opera Jesus Christ Superstar by Andrew Lloyd Webber and Tim Rice. A US Air Force communications technician, a World Wide Air Force Talent Contest singer who toured across the world visiting bases, and a Howard University psychology graduate, Anderson was nominated in two Golden Globe categories for his 1973 film performance: "Most Promising Newcomer" and "Best Musical Actor". Anderson signed with Motown Records in 1972 and contributed to Songs in the Key of Life 1976 by Stevie Wonder, among other credits. In 1986, Anderson and singer-actress Gloria Loring joined for their harmonious duet Friends and Lovers (Gloria Loring and Carl Anderson song), which immediately reached No. 2 on the Billboard Hot 100 chart.
- Beth Behrs – American actor, UCLA School of Theater, Film and Television graduate, and philanthropist most known for starring in the comedy 2 Broke Girls 2011-2017 and for founding the SheHerdPower Foundation, which helps victims of sexual assaults.
- Connie Britton – American actor and Dartmouth College graduate best known for her Emmy-nominated captivating portrayal of coach's wife and mentor Tami Taylor in Friday Night Lights 2004-2011, for playing Vivien Harmon in American Horror Story: Murder House 2011, for her Primetime Emmy Award for Outstanding Lead Actress in a Miniseries or a Movie-nominated portrayal of country-music superstar Rayna Jaymes in Nashville 2012-2016, and for featuring with Robert De Niro in the Netflix series Zero Day (American TV series) 2025
- Joan Brock (Class of 1964) – Philanthropist and former Rector of the Longwood University Board of Visitors. A 1968 graduate of Longwood, Brock and her husband Macon funded the Chesapeake Bay Foundation's Brock Environmental Center, a "Living Building" designed as one of the world's most sustainable educational hubs, utilizing wind turbines and solar arrays to produce more energy than it consumes in its mission of regional bay restoration.
- Ruben Brown – American NFL guard who started with the University of Pittsburgh and had a long career with the Buffalo Bills and the Chicago Bears. Selected nine times for the Pro-Bowl and four-times All-Pro 1995–2007.
- Brad Butler – American NFL tackle and guard. 5th Round Draft 2006 NFL draft for the Buffalo Bills. Four-year starter at the University of Virginia.
- Owen Cardwell (Class of 1964) – Civil rights pioneer and educator who was one of the "Original four" students to integrate E.C. Glass in 1962. Facing daily harassment, Cardwell made the strategic decision to remain a "silent, steady presence" in the hallways, intentionally outperforming his peers academically to disprove the era's racial prejudices.
- Bill Chambers – American record-setting collegiate basketball center 1950-1953 and later award-winning head coach, all at William & Mary. At EC Glass, Chambers led his team to a state championship and an undefeated season (22–0) during his senior year.
- Bill Chipley – NFL receiver, defensive end, and defensive back who started at Clemson University, transferred to Washington and Lee, played with the NFL, then returned to Washington and Lee as head coach 1955-1956. First drafted into the NFL in 1947 by the Boston Yanks/New York Bulldogs
- Ken Clay – Talented MLB pitcher and 1972 New York Yankees draftee (Clay got the call immediately after his high school graduation) with a long pitching career with the New York Yankees, the Texas Rangers, and the Seattle Mariners.
- Gilliam Cobbs (Class of 1963) – Educator and community leader who became the first African American faculty member at E.C. Glass in 1966. During the volatile 1970 school merger, Cobbs acted as a pivotal "resistant presence," famously standing between conflicting student factions to maintain peace in the newly integrated hallways.
- Mickey Fitzgerald - American NFL fullback who started at Virginia Tech and was then recruited by the Atlanta Falcons 1981 followed by the Philadelphia Eagles 1981
- Allison Daugherty – Broadway and film actress and educator. Daugherty’s credits include Sex and the City and Law & Order: Criminal Intent; she later returned to her alma mater to serve as the Artistic Director of Glass Theatre, stating her "theatre seed was planted at Glass."
- John "Jack" A. Fees (Class of 1971) – Industrial leader and former Chairman of BWX Technologies (BWXT). Fees spent his career within Lynchburg's nuclear corridor, overseeing the transition of the historic Babcock & Wilcox into a specialized national security hub providing nuclear components and "cool tech" infrastructure for the United States Navy and NASA.
- Paul Fitzgerald – American actor, writer, and director best known for his roles in Teenage Mutant Ninja Turtles 1984, The Secret Life of Walter Mitty 2013 (based on the 1947 James Thurber short-story), and as US president Perry Morgan (the first clearly gay president depicted in a major American TV series) in the 2025 Netflix series The Residence.
- Bdale Garbee - Legendary Open Source programmer, former board member at Linux Foundation founded in 2000, winner of the 'Free and Open Source Software' FLOSS "Lutèce d'Or" award in 2008, Paris Capitale du Libre FLOSS Personality of the Year 2008, and Chief Technologist for Open Source and Linux at Hewlett Packard and Samsung. A Debian Linux developer and "Free Software" advocate - including speeches at Linux conferences around the world 2002-2014 - Bdale "Barksdale" Garbee helped establish our current open cooperative code-sharing culture, from GitHub to SourceForge. Garbee's developer interface for Debian, master.debian.org, launched in 1995. Garbee served as Debian Project Leader 2002–2003 and also as Debian Technical Committee head. In high school, the Lynchburg College servers were made available to E.C. Glass High students in the period 1981-1982, for multiple BASIC/UNIX projects in one of E.C. Glass High's first programming classes.
- Josh Hall – MLB starting pitcher for the Cincinnati Reds 2003
- David Lee – American writer and graduate of California's University of Redlands most known for being the award-winning writer and producer for the popular American television shows The Jeffersons 1975-1985, Cheers 1982-1993, and Frasier 1993-2004, as well as for being the writer of multiple critically-acclaimed films and Broadway musicals. Lee's awards include: Primetime Emmy Awards, Directors Guild Awards, Golden Globe Awards, Producers Guild Award, GLAAD Media Award, British Comedy Award, three Television Critics Association Awards, two Humanitas Prizes, and the Peabody Award. The main listing in Wikipedia for David Lee no longer reflects his time at E.C. Glass, which perhaps should be one's prerogative.
- L.H. McCue Jr. (Class of 1927) – Principal and administrator known as the "Dean of Lynchburg Educators" who governed the school during the 1970 reorganization. In a time of profound civil upheaval, McCue acted as the moral anchor of the "split-campus" era, famously insisting that the school's "Tradition of Excellence" be used not as an exclusive gatekeeper, but as a universal standard for every student entering the newly integrated building.
- Andy Oldham – American attorney, graduate of University of Virginia, University of Cambridge and Harvard Law School, and a George W. Bush-administration official appointed by President Donald J. Trump in 2018 to serve on the United States Court of Appeals for the Fifth Circuit
- Anthony Parnther – American conductor and orchestrator who played cello, bassoon and tuba at E.C. Glass. He is currently the Music Director of the San Bernardino Symphony and the Southeast Symphony in Los Angeles. Parnther is a prolific conductor for major motion picture scores, most notably leading the recording sessions for the Oscar-winning score of Black Panther: Wakanda Forever and Avatar: The Way of Water.
- Mosby Perrow Jr. – Virginia State Senator (1943–1964), Washington and Lee graduate, and key figure in the commonwealth's abandonment of "Massive Resistance" to desegregation. Perrow’s work in the Senate helped the doors to stay open for other Glass graduates in this list - Owen Cardwell and Lynda Woodruff - who walked into E.C. Glass in 1962 with the spirit of being.
- Faith Prince – Award-winning American actor and graduate of the University of Cincinnati – College-Conservatory of Music most known for acclaimed Broadway musical performances as well as for multiple roles in film and television. Prince won the Tony Award and the Drama Desk Award for Best Actress in Guys and Dolls in 1992, and was nominated again in 2001 for the same two awards for her portrayal of Ella Peterson in the revival of Bells Are Ringing (musical). In 2008 Prince received Tony and Drama Desk nominations for featuring in A Catered Affair - a musical of the 1956 Gore Vidal film The Catered Affair.
- Charles W. Pryor Jr. – Leading nuclear engineer and former CEO of Westinghouse Electric Company. A graduate of E.C. Glass and Virginia Tech, Pryor's career was sparked by Lynchburg mentor Martin Johnson, then-president of Wiley & Wilson, who transformed Pryor's teenage perception of engineering from manual construction to a professional calling.
- Gregory Eugene Smith (Class of 1972) – Philadelphia Court of Common Pleas Judge and standout student-athlete during the 1970 school merger. A "quiet force" for justice, Smith navigated the racial tensions of the integrated era by channeling his discipline on the basketball court into a legal career where he founded the Philadelphia Chapter of the National Bar Association's Judicial Council to support minority jurists.
- Kara Stein – American attorney and Yale Law School graduate appointed by President Barack Obama in 2013 to serve on the five-member U.S. Securities and Exchange Commission (SEC), a position she held until 2019. Prior to that, Stein held the position of Chief Legal Aide to Democratic Senator Jack Reed of Rhode Island, during which time she helped write the 2010 Dodd–Frank Wall Street Reform and Consumer Protection Act, a response to the 2008 financial crisis
- Randall Wallace – American screenwriter, director, producer and Duke University graduate most notable for adapting the Blind Harry 1477 CE epic poem "The Actes and Deidis of the Illustre and Vallyeant Campioun Schir William Wallace" The Wallace (poem) into an award-winning screenplay for the blockbuster film Braveheart (1995). Wallace next made his directorial debut with his own screenplay in The Man in the Iron Mask (1998) starring Leonardo DiCaprio, John Malkovich, Gabriel Byrne, Jeremy Irons and Gérard Depardieu. Shortly after, he wrote the screenplay for Pearl Harbor (film) (2001) directed by Michael Bay and starring Ben Affleck, Josh Hartnett and Kate Beckinsale. Nota Bene: Randall Wallace is not directly related to the historical personage William Wallace (1270-1305), as per Randall.
- Lynda Woodruff (Class of 1965) – Civil rights pioneer who, alongside Owen Cardwell Jr., became one of the first two African American students to integrate E.C. Glass in January 1962. Despite facing intense isolation and harassment, she graduated and became a nationally recognized leader and professor in the field of physical therapy.
