= Devotion (2022 film) =

2022 biographical war film directed by J. D. Dillard

- Theatrical release poster
- Directed by: J. D. Dillard
- Screenplay by: Jake Crane; Jonathan A. Stewart
- Based on: Devotion: An Epic Story of Heroism, Friendship, and Sacrifice by Adam Makos
- Produced by: Molly Smith; Rachel Smith; Thad Luckinbill; Trent Luckinbill
- Starring: Jonathan Majors; Glen Powell; Christina Jackson; Thomas Sadoski
- Cinematography: Erik Messerschmidt
- Edited by: Billy Fox
- Music by: Chanda Dancy
- Production company: Black Label Media
- Distributed by: Columbia Pictures and Stage 6 Films (United States and Canada; through Sony Pictures Releasing) (Note: Theatrical distribution only; home media rights in the US and Canada were handled by Paramount Home Entertainment.); STX International (International)
- Release dates: September 12, 2022 (TIFF); November 23, 2022 (United States)
- Running time: 139 minutes
- Country: United States
- Language: English
- Budget: $90 million
- Box office: $21.8 million

Devotion is a 2022 American biographical war film based on Devotion: An Epic Story of Heroism, Friendship, and Sacrifice by Adam Makos, which shows the comradeship between naval officers Jesse L. Brown and Tom Hudner during the Korean War. Directed by J. D. Dillard and written by Jake Crane and Jonathan Stewart, it stars Jonathan Majors as Brown and Glen Powell as Hudner, with Christina Jackson, Daren Kagasoff, Joe Jonas, Nick Hargrove, Spencer Neville, and Thomas Sadoski in supporting roles.

Devotion premiered at the Toronto International Film Festival in IMAX at the Ontario Place Cinesphere on September 12, 2022, and was released by Columbia Pictures through Sony Pictures Releasing in the United States on November 23, 2022. While it received positive reviews from critics and audiences, it was a box-office bomb, grossing only $21.8 million worldwide against a $90 million budget.

== Plot ==
In early 1950, Lieutenant Tom Hudner transfers to Fighter Squadron 32 (VF-32) at Quonset Point Naval Air Station, where he meets Ensign Jesse Brown, the only black member of the unit. Hudner integrates well into the squadron, which is assigned F4U-4 Corsairs – powerful planes with a reputation for fatal accidents if not handled properly. After Brown's car breaks down, Hudner starts giving him rides and eventually meets his wife Daisy and their young daughter Pam. The Browns are doing well, but struggle with racist neighbors, and Brown has resorted to shouting racist abuse at himself in the mirror for motivation before missions.

VF-32 passes their carrier tests with the Corsair and transfers to the USS Leyte, which is deployed to the Mediterranean Sea to deter Soviet aggression. Before they leave, Daisy has Hudner promise that he will be there for Jesse. On the voyage, squadron member Mohring is killed in a crash while attempting to land a Corsair. Hudner questions why Mohring did not follow instructions, but Brown explains that one cannot always follow directions – if Brown had solely done what he himself was told, he would have been stopped early in his career by the many racist superior officers who wanted him to fail.

The unit has shore leave in Cannes, France, where Brown encounters actress Elizabeth Taylor on the beach and secures invitations for the squadron to a casino, impressing them. After Hudner gets in a drunken fight with a Marine who had previously harassed Brown, Brown tells Hudner not to fight his battles for him, but simply to be there for him. Brown is given an expensive watch by Leyte's black crewmen, who admire him for his work.

The next day, the squadron is informed that war has broken out between North and South Korea, and Leyte is redeploying to support the South. In November 1950, VF-32 arrives in Korea and learns that Chinese troops have entered the war on the North Korean side and begun to push American forces back. The squadron deploys to destroy a pair of bridges on the Yalu River between China and North Korea, though they are only permitted to fire on the Korean side of the border. Brown and Hudner fight off a MiG-15 fighter jet while the others attack the bridges, but one remains standing. While Hudner orders a retreat in the face of anti-aircraft fire from the Chinese side of the river, Brown disobeys him and attacks the bridge solo, successfully crippling it.

Hudner's after-action report praises Brown but also mentions that he was acting against orders, which Brown tells Hudner will be used as an excuse to deny him promotions for the rest of his career, despite Hudner's attempt to revise the report. On another mission to support besieged Marines (including the Marine who earlier harassed Brown) at the Battle of Chosin Reservoir, Brown's Corsair is crippled, and he is forced to crash-land in a clearing in the mountains of North Korea. Hudner sees that Brown is alive but trapped in his cockpit and deliberately crashes his own plane in the clearing in order to aid Brown. Though he puts out an engine fire, Hudner is unable to extract the wounded Brown from the wreckage, and Brown dies shortly after a Marine Sikorsky helicopter arrives to assist him. Back on Leyte, Hudner's commander determines that it is too risky to attempt to recover Brown's body from the Chinese-controlled area, and VF-32 (minus the injured Hudner) is instead sent on a "funeral flight" to destroy the downed Corsairs, with Brown's corpse still inside.

Several months later, a heartbroken Hudner receives the Medal of Honor from President Harry S. Truman for his attempts to save Brown. Hudner speaks with Daisy after the ceremony and apologizes for failing to rescue her husband. Daisy remarks that she only made him promise to be there for Jesse, not to save him, and Hudner tells her that Jesse's final words were about how much he loved her.

The film ends with a note that Brown's remains have never been recovered from North Korea, and that Hudner and Brown's families remain close friends to this day.

== Cast ==
- Jonathan Majors as Ensign Jesse L. Brown
- Glen Powell as Lieutenant Junior Grade Tom Hudner
- Christina Jackson as Daisy Brown
- Thomas Sadoski as Lieutenant Commander Dick Cevoli
- Daren Kagasoff as Bill Koenig
- Joe Jonas as Marty Goode
- Spencer Neville as Bo Lavery
- Nick Hargrove as Carol Mohring
- Boone Platt as Buddy Gill
- Dean Denton as USS Leyte (CV-32) Captain T.U. Sisson
- Thad Luckinbill as Peters
- Joseph Cross as Charlie Ward
- Serinda Swan as Elizabeth Taylor
- Bill Martin Williams as President Harry S. Truman

== Production ==
In March 2018, Black Label Media optioned the rights to Devotion on Glen Powell's recommendation, coming aboard as a producer and commitment to play Tom Hudner. In December 2019, it was announced that Jonathan Majors was cast as Jesse Brown and J. D. Dillard was set to direct. In September 2020, it was announced that Sony Pictures would distribute the film under the Columbia Pictures label in North America, while STXfilms would handle international sales and distribution for the film. In February 2021, Serinda Swan was cast as Elizabeth Taylor.

Dillard, the son of a naval aviator himself, felt a close personal connection to the subject, due to stories told him by his father of his experiences as the lone black man in a predominantly white aviation community. In an interview with Deadline Hollywood, he said, "Both technically and socially, they both dealt with isolation and there's so many pieces there that I think ultimately just became the DNA of the film." Dillard's father also visited the set and served as a technical advisor for the film. His contribution to the film is recognized by a separate card in the end credits.

Powell, who read Adam Makos's book when it first came out in 2015, brought it to Molly Smith of Black Label to option and went to visit Thomas J. Hudner Jr. shortly before he died in 2017. He was struck by the photographs and mementos of Jesse Brown around the house, remarking that, "I saw what weight that was on him. It wasn't a celebration, it was a constant reminder of a friend he lost and I carried that weight into this role."

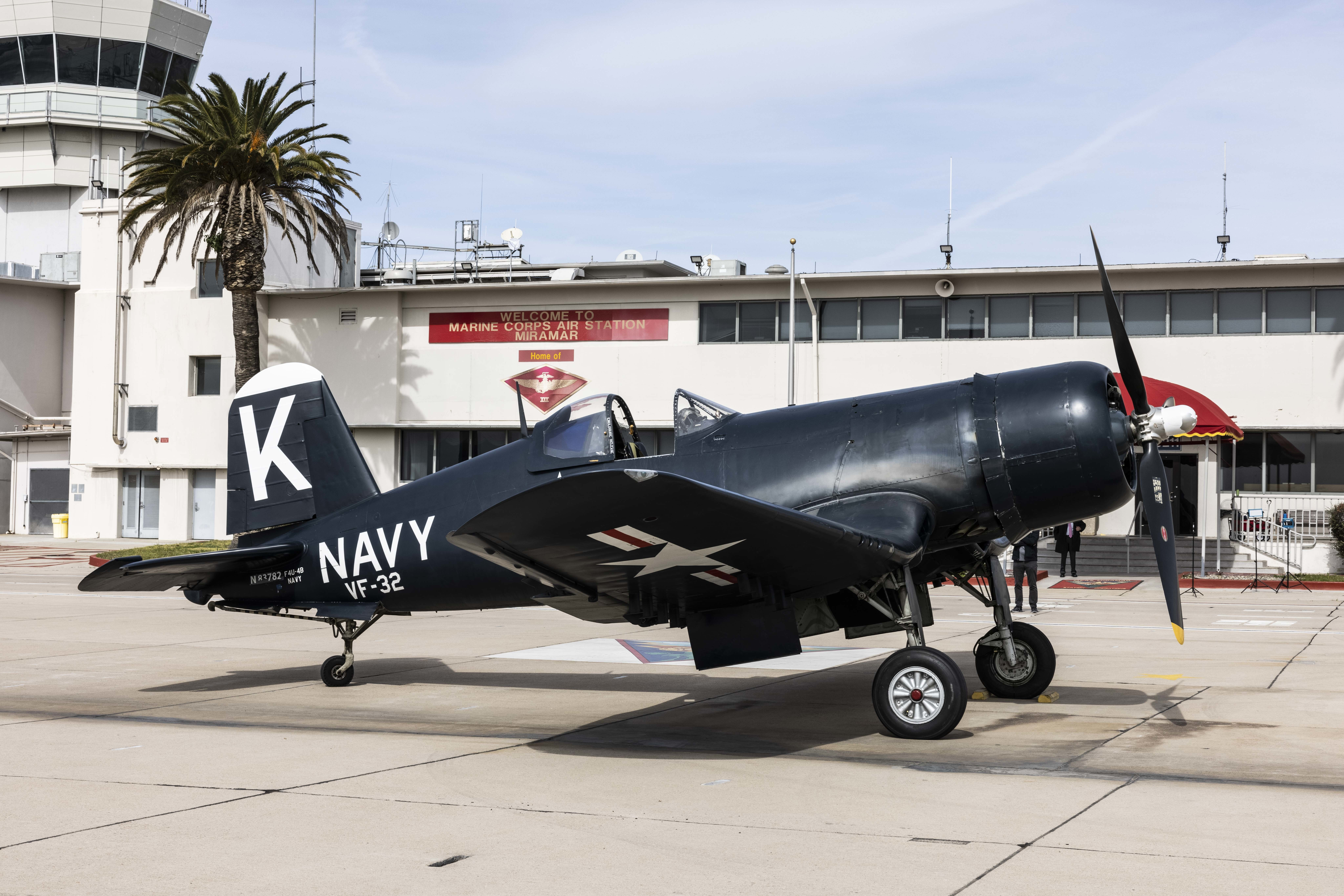
F4U-1A Corsair painted as F4U-4 for the film

Principal photography began on February 4, 2021, in Savannah, Georgia. Filming also took place in Charleston, South Carolina, East Wenatchee and Pasco, Washington, Statesboro, Georgia, and from March 17 to April 13, 2021, at the Statesboro-Bulloch County Airport, where a full-size recreation of the USS Leyte was built. The wintry landscape of Washington state stood in for the Battle of Chosin Reservoir.

Dillard was determined to create practical effects using real aircraft as much as possible, including several F4U Corsairs, an AD Skyraider, two F8F Bearcat fighters, one of the few remaining flyable HO5S-1 helicopters, and a MiG-15. The 11 aircraft were painted with the dark colors and prominent lettering of the squadrons of the period. Dillard hired aerial stunt coordinator Kevin LaRosa, who created the flight sequences for Top Gun: Maverick. A modified L-39 Albatros trainer was used as an air-to-air camera platform. Interior footage of actors flying the Bearcat was created using a Hawker Sea Fury with its rear seat modified to resemble a Bearcat cockpit and visible parts of the aircraft painted like a VF-32 Bearcat, allowing actors to simulate piloting the aircraft during actual aerial maneuvers. Real audio of a Corsair in flight was captured with five microphones for use in the soundtrack.

== Music ==
Chanda Dancy, a graduate of USC Thornton School of Music, composed the movie soundtrack, which was released by Lakeshore Records. The soundtrack was shortlisted for Best Original Score on Dec 21, 2022 for the 95th Academy Awards, but did not get the ultimate nomination on Jan 24, 2023.

Joe Jonas and Khalid wrote and performed a duet to the end credits song called "Not Alone", but the single was not part of the soundtrack, and not shortlisted for Academy Award for Best Original Song.

Track listing
No.	Title	Length
1.	"The Forgotten War"	2:22
2.	"The Lighthouse"	4:06
3.	"The Corsair"	0:54
4.	"Jesse"	1:42
5.	"Procedure"	2:17
6.	"Quiet Night"	2:23
7.	"On the Edge"	5:05
8.	"Pam"	1:41
9.	"You Belong in the Sky"	2:48
10.	"Carol's Death"	2:35
11.	"You Can't Always Do What You're Told"	3:10
12.	"All Bets Are On"	2:35
13.	"I Fight My Own Fights"	0:50
14.	"Sinuiju"	1:59
15.	"Sortie"	4:20
16.	"River Run"	2:11
17.	"Hagaru"	2:36
18.	"We See You"	1:18
19.	"A Gift for Daisy"	2:23
20.	"Return to Chosin"	1:21
21.	"Metal Angels"	2:07
22.	"Jesse Crashes"	2:50
23.	"Measure of a Man"	2:00
24.	"Devotion"	3:29
25.	"Aftermath"	2:08
26.	"Accepting What We Can't Accept"	3:29
27.	"Medals"	2:00
28.	"Be There for Them"	2:39
29.	"Closing Credits"	2:08
Total length:		71:26

== Release ==
Devotion had its world premiere at the Toronto International Film Festival in IMAX at the Ontario Place Cinesphere on September 12, 2022, and also as the opening night film of Film Fest 919 on October 19, 2022. It had its U.S. premiere at the 58th Chicago International Film Festival on October 22, 2022. It was theatrically released on November 23, 2022. It was originally scheduled to be released in limited theaters on October 14, 2022, followed by a wide expansion on October 28, 2022.

=== Home media ===
Devotion was released on Digital HD and for streaming on Paramount+ on January 8, 2023, in North America with Paramount Pictures taking over distribution from Sony. It was released in the United Kingdom via Prime Video and select regions via Netflix on January 20, 2023, in UHD HDR10+, with releases on Ultra HD Blu-ray, Blu-ray and DVD on February 28, 2023, by Paramount Home Entertainment.

== Reception ==
=== Box office ===
Devotion grossed $20.5 million in the United States and Canada, and $1.2 million in other territories, for a worldwide total of $21.7 million. Deadline Hollywood calculated the net losses of the film to be $89.2 million, when factoring together all expenses and revenues.

In the United States and Canada, Devotion was released alongside Strange World and Glass Onion: A Knives Out Mystery, as well as with the wide expansions of The Fabelmans and Bones and All, and was projected to gross $7–8 million from 3,405 theaters over its five-day opening weekend. The film made $1.8 million on its first day, including $615,000 from Tuesday night previews. It went on to debut to $5.9 million in its opening weekend and $9 million over the five days, finishing fourth. It was the overall lowest-grossing Thanksgiving weekend box office in decades. In its sophomore weekend the film made $2.7 million, finishing fourth.

=== Critical response ===
On the review aggregator website Rotten Tomatoes, 81% of 118 critics' reviews are positive, with an average rating of 6.7/10. The website's critics consensus reads, "Honoring real-life history while delivering impactful drama, Devotion is a straightforward biopic elevated by standout performances from a talented cast." Metacritic, which uses a weighted average, assigned the film a score of 66 out of 100, based on 30 critics, indicating "generally favorable" reviews. Audiences polled by CinemaScore gave the film an average grade of "A–" on an A+ to F scale, while those at PostTrak gave the film an overall 91% positive score.

Matthew Creith from Screen Rant wrote "Stylized and cultured, Devotion soars when least expected and is brought to life by its talented ensemble cast led by Jonathan Majors and Glen Powell."

=== Accolades ===
Accolades received by Glass Onion: A Knives Out Mystery
Award	Date of ceremony	Category	Recipient(s)	Result	Ref.
African-American Film Critics Association Awards	March 1, 2023	Best Picture		Nominated	
Black Reel Awards	February 6, 2023	Outstanding Film		Nominated	
Black Reel Awards	February 6, 2023	Outstanding Actor	Jonathan Majors	Nominated	
Black Reel Awards	February 6, 2023	Outstanding Production Design	Wynn Thomas	Nominated	
Georgia Film Critics Association	January 13, 2023	Oglethorpe Award for Excellence		Nominated	
NAACP Image Awards	February 25, 2023	Outstanding Actor in a Motion Picture	Jonathan Majors	Nominated	
