= Jonathan Wysocki =

American writer, director and producer

- Born: Jonathan Wysocki; November 13, 1976 (age 49); Escondido, California
- Education: University of California, Los Angeles; UCLA School of Theater, Film and Television
- Occupations: Film Director, Film Producer, Screenwriter
- Spouse: José Aparicio (2018-)
- Website: www.jonathanwysocki.com

Jonathan Wysocki (born November 13, 1976) is an American writer, director and producer of independent films. He is known for his feature film Dramarama (2020), and for his award-winning short films A Doll's Eyes (2016) and Adjust-A-Dream (2014).

== Early life and background ==
Wysocki was born and raised in Escondido, California. He became involved with theatre from a young age, frequently performing at his local community theatre, Patio Playhouse, as well as in many high school productions. He graduated from Orange Glen High School in Escondido in 1994, and earned a bachelor's degree in Theatre Arts from the University of California, Los Angeles in 1998. While in college, Wysocki spent a year studying drama at the University of Exeter in the United Kingdom, and following his graduation from the college, he spent a year working with the Amakhosi Theatre in Zimbabwe. Wysocki went on to complete an MFA in Film Production at the UCLA School of Theater, Film and Television. While completing his film degree, Wysocki wrote and directed two award-winning short films, The Way Station (2004) and The Vessel Pitches (2005).

== Career ==
While completing his master's degree, Wysocki was selected as a fellow for the Film Independent Project Involve mentorship program, where he was paired with the film and television director Charles Herman-Wurmfeld, known for the film Kissing Jessica Stein. Wysocki worked as Herman-Wurmfeld's executive assistant on Legally Blonde 2: Red, White & Blonde.

Wysocki's next project, a feature film entitled All Fall Down about a young boy who dresses up as Osama Bin Laden for Halloween soon after the September 11th attacks, was selected for the Sundance Institute Feature Film Program Screenwriters Lab in 2008, and Directors Lab in 2009. Wysocki was awarded the Lynn Auerbach Screenwriting Fellowship, and two Annenberg Grants for the project. The project was selected for the Independent Filmmaker Project No Borders marketplace in 2009, but has yet to be produced.

Wysocki went on to write and direct Adjust-A-Dream (2014), a short film that premiered at the LA Film Festival and screened at an additional 40 film festivals, including in the American Pavilion Emerging Filmmakers' Showcase at the Cannes Film Festival in 2015 and the Palm Springs International ShortsFest in 2015.

He subsequently wrote and directed Alibi Nation (2015), a short film which won the Best Independent Short-Suspense/thriller award at the Worldfest-Houston International Film Festival

His 2016 short film, A Doll's Eyes, premiered at the Frameline Film Festival and screened at more than 50 film festivals. The film won 10 awards including the Cinephile Award at the Busan International Short Film Festival. In this short documentary, Wysocki explores his experience with queer shame through the lens of a childhood obsession with the 1975 movie, Jaws.

Wysocki released his first feature, Dramarama, in 2020. Wysocki wrote and directed the semi-autobiographical story, based on his own experience growing up as a deeply religious, sexually repressed, closeted drama kid in Escondido, California. The film premiered at the San Francisco International Film Festival, and has screened at 21 festivals and has won three awards since its debut.

In addition to writing, directing and producing his own films, Wysocki has worked as a producer on the feature films The Hammer (2007) and Thrasher Road (2018), and as a feature programmer for the Los Angeles Film Festival. He is a Fellow of the Berlinale Talents and an advisor for Sundance Co//ab. Wysocki is a lecturer at Chapman University's Dodge College of Film and Media Arts, Occidental College and California State University, Long Beach.

== Filmography ==
- Dramarama (2020)-writer/director/producer
- Thrasher Road (2018)-producer
- A Doll's Eyes (2016) (documentary short film)-writer/director/producer
- Alibi Nation (2015) (short film)-writer/director/producer
- Adjust-A-Dream (2014) (short film)-writer/director
- The Hammer (2007)-associate producer
- The Vessel Pitches (2005) (short film)-writer/director
- The Way Station (2004) (short film)-writer/director/producer

== Awards ==
Year	Award	Category	Work	Result	Ref
2016	Iris Prize Festival	Iris Prize Best Documentary Short	A Doll's Eyes (short)	Nominated	
2016	Oslo/Fusion International Film Festival	Jury Prize: Best Short Film	A Doll's Eyes (short)	Won	
2017	Busan International Short Film Festival	Cinephile Award	A Doll's Eyes (short)	Won	
2020	Tallgrass Film Festival	Outstanding Screenplay	Dramarama	Won	
2020	Woods Hole Film Festival	Jury Award: Best Comedy Feature	Dramarama	Won	

== Bibliography ==
- Wysocki, Jonathan (2020-09-16). "Don't look now, or my struggles with autobiographical filmmaking". Talkhouse. Retrieved 2021-02-01.
- Wysocki, Jonathan (2017-10-27). "Taming the beast of queer shame". The Advocate. Retrieved 2020-09-18.
