= California Theatre of the Performing Arts =

Performing arts center in California, US

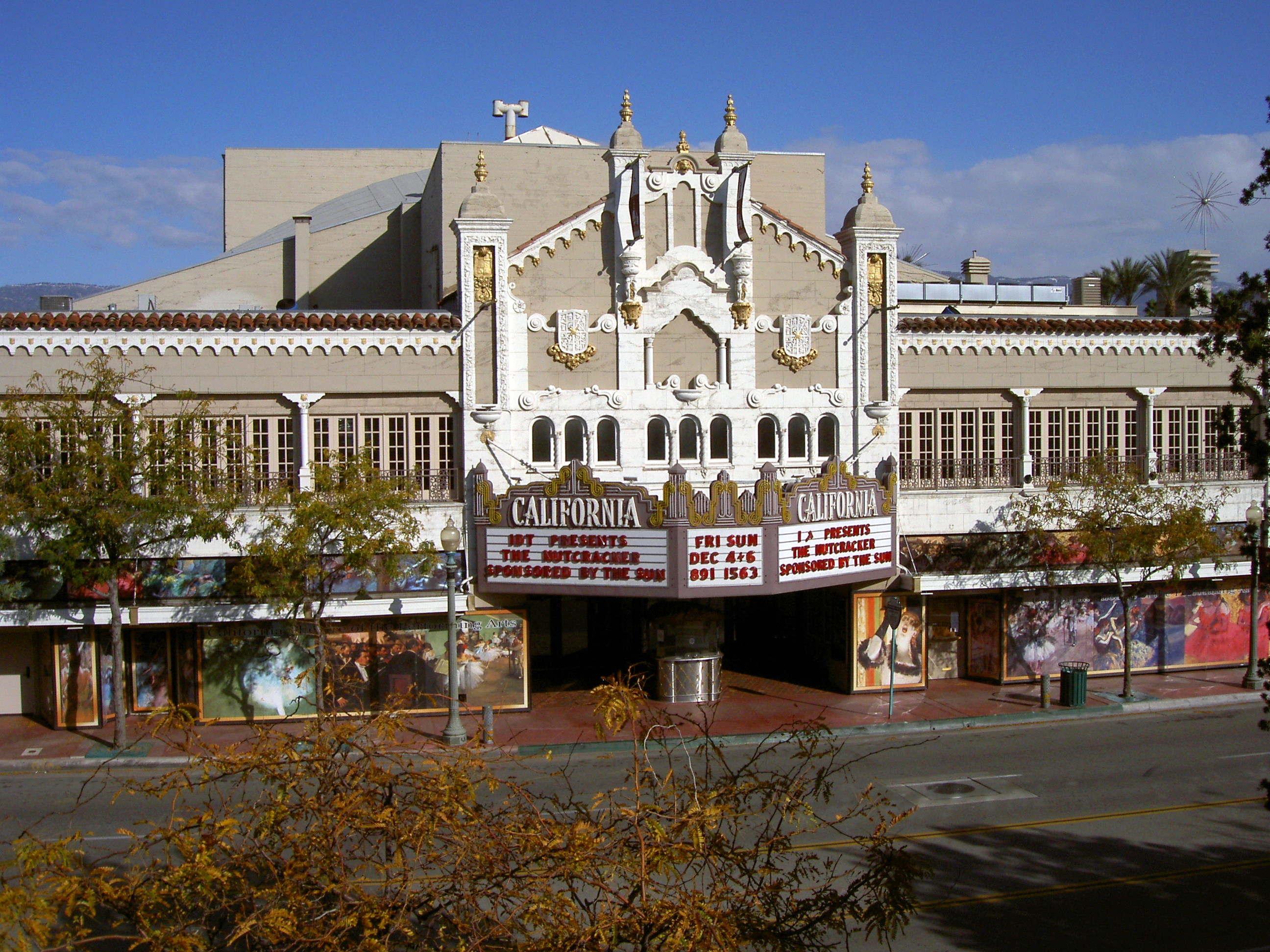
- Interactive map of California Theatre of the Performing Arts
- Address: 562 W. 4th St. San Bernardino, California; United States
- Owner: City of San Bernardino
- Operator: Theatre Arts International
- Capacity: 1,718
- Type: Movie palace
- Screen: 1
- Current use: Performing arts venue

Construction
- Opened: 1928

Website
- www.californiatheatre.net
- California Theatre
- U.S. National Register of Historic Places
- Location within California Location within the United States
- Coordinates: 34°6′23″N 117°17′43″W
- Area: 0.5 acres (0.20 ha)
- Architect: Perrine, John Paxton
- Architectural style: California Churrigueresque
- NRHP reference No.: 09001116
- Added to NRHP: December 22, 2009

The California Theatre of the Performing Arts or simply referred to as the California Theatre is a performing arts center in the historic Downtown area of San Bernardino, California. Originally a part of the Fox Theatres chain, it opened in 1928. It still houses its original Wurlitzer Style 216 pipe organ. It was also the site of the last performance by Will Rogers prior to his death in a 1935 plane crash.

In the early years of Hollywood, filmmakers would test-screen their movies at the California Theatre. Classic films such as King Kong and The Wizard of Oz were first seen by audiences at the theatre in the 1930s.

The theatre is managed by Theatrical Arts International, the largest theatre company in the Inland Empire, which presents Broadway tours from the national touring circuit, and has hosted the San Bernardino Symphony since 1929. The theatre has recently hosted the tapings of Showtime's The Latin Divas of Comedy, and The Payaso Comedy Slam.
