= Heritage High School (Lynchburg, Virginia) =

Coordinates: 37°21′38.9″N 79°12′20.9″W

Location
- 3020 Wards Ferry Road; Lynchburg, Virginia 24502; United States

Information
- School type: Public, high school
- Founded: 1976
- School district: Lynchburg City Public Schools
- Superintendent: Crystal Edwards
- Principal: Timothy Beatty
- Teaching staff: 66.75 (FTE)
- Grades: 9–12
- Enrollment: 1,073 (2022-23)
- Student to teacher ratio: 16.07
- Language: English
- Campus: City
- Colors: Orange and Navy
- Athletics conference: Virginia High School League; Class AAA Region C Seminole District
- Mascot: Pioneer
- Nickname: Big Orange
- Rival: E.C. Glass High School, Brookville High School, Amherst County High School, Jefferson Forest High School
- Website: Official Site

Heritage High School is a public high school located in Lynchburg, Virginia. The school is a part of Lynchburg City Public Schools District. Timothy Beatty is the head principal. Heritage has enrollment of 1,073 as of 2022. Its mascot is the Pioneer and its colors are Navy Blue and Orange.

Because of structural issues, the existing school building was demolished in 2016 and the new Heritage High School campus was completed.

== History ==
In January, 1975, a steering committee, representative of educators, students, parents, and the community at large, was appointed to begin planning a new high school to accommodate approximately 2,000 students. This committee and twenty-three subcommittees worked under the able direction of Dr. Ernest Martin, Special Assistant to the Superintendent, to draw up the initial specifications for the new school. From this planning merged the architects' design of an ultra-modern structure, beautiful in appearance and functional in use.

The new school had no real identity until the spring of 1976, when a special School Board committee, chaired by Mr. James K. Candler, made the following announcement: "We propose Heritage High School as a fitting name for the city's newest secondary building. The name shall serve to remind this generation and generations to come that the first responsibility in public education is to see that our democratic way of life is preserved through an informed electorate. This name shall call to mind both the pride in achievements in the past and shall hold forth a challenge for greater progress in the future. It shall provide a continuing reminder to Lynchburg educators and citizens of the obligation which is theirs - to mold the future through the education of the youth - to carry on the heritage of free education first established in the city of Lynchburg in 1871 and in the Colony of Virginia in 1634.

The building suffered many structural problems that resulted in the need for higher maintenance costs than comparable schools. In 2007, the Lynchburg School Board hired a firm to suggest ways to either renovate the building, merge the school population to E.C. Glass, or replace it. A task force urged replacement in a September 2011 report. In March 2014, the Lynchburg City Council approved a $63.4 million bid from Barton Malow to build the new school in time for the beginning of the 2016 school year.

== Athletics ==
Heritage (Lynchburg) has won a number of VHSL Seminole District, Region III, and State Championships at the AAA and AA level.

=== State championships ===
- Recent Champions*

2002

- Virginia State AA Division 4 Football Champions
  - Lafayette High School-Williamsburg - 7 vs Heritage High School - 34
- Virginia State AA Indoor Track Champions (Boys)

2003

- Virginia State AA Indoor Track Champions (Boys)
- Virginia State AA Indoor Track Runner-Up (Girls)
- Virginia State AA Outdoor Track Champions (Girls)
- Virginia State AA Outdoor Track Champions (Boys)

2004

- Virginia State AA Basketball Final Four Tournament (Boys)

2005

- Virginia State AA Baseball Final Four

2006

- Virginia State AA Indoor Track Champions (Boys)

2018

- Virginia State Class AAA STATE FOOTBALL CHAMPIONS

Heritage 24, Phoebus 20 Williams Stadium (Lynchburg, VA)

2019

- Virginia State AA Outdoor Track Champions (Girls)

=== Regionals ===
1978

- Northwest Region AAA Baseball Champions

1997

- Division 4, Region 3 Football Champions

-Heritage 20, Salem 14

2002

- Division 4, Region 3 Football Champions

- Heritage 28, Blacksburg 10

2003

- Region III Outdoor Track Champions (Girls)
- Region III Outdoor Track Champions (Boys)
- Region III Indoor Track Champions (Girls)
- Region III Indoor Track Champions (Boys)

2004

- Region III Indoor Track Champions (Girls)

2005

- Region III Indoor Track Champions (Boys)
- Region III Baseball Champions (Dream Team)

2006

- Region III Indoor Track Champions (Boys)

2008

- Region III Indoor Track Champions (Boys)

2012

- Division 4, Region 3 Football Champions

-Heritage 12, Amherst County 7

2017

- Class AAA, Region C Football Champions

— Heritage 62, Brookville 20

2018

- Class AAA, Region C Football Champions

-Heritage 44, Liberty (Bed) 28

2019

- Class AAA, Region C Football Champions

-Heritage 43, Spotswood 20

== Notable alumni ==
- Leland D. Melvin (NASA engineer and astronaut)
- Paris Lenon (former NFL Linebacker)
- Keith Hamilton (former NFL Lineman)
- Chris Cook (NFL Cornerback-last play with the San Francisco 49ers)
- Chris Parker (former NFL running back)
- Kevin Keatts, former head coach for NC State Wolfpack men's basketball and UNC Wilmington.
