= San Bernardino Symphony =

American symphony orchestra

San Bernardino Symphony Orchestra
- Orchestra
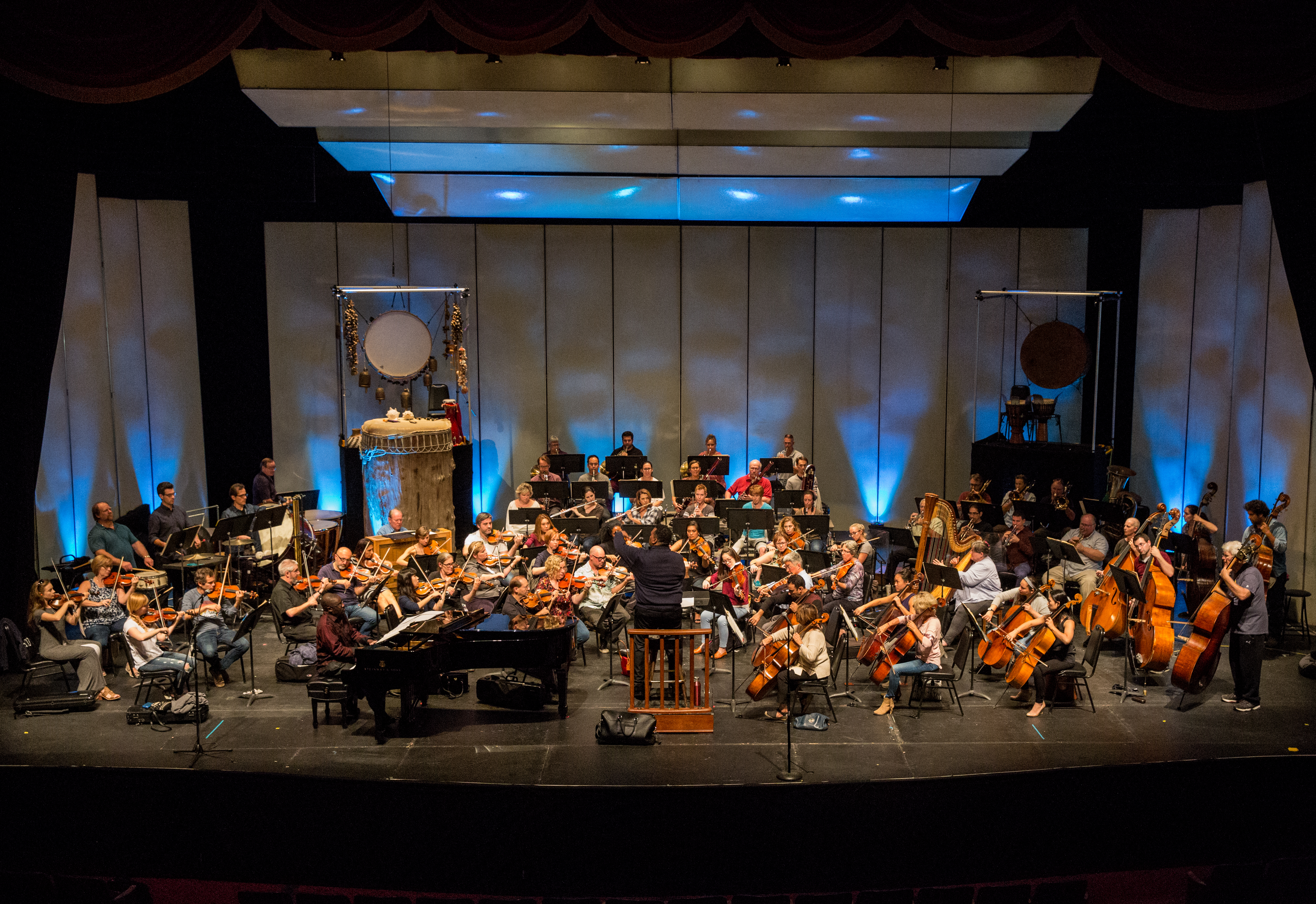
- Former name: The Inland Empire Philharmonic Orchestra
- Founded: 1928; 98 years ago
- Location: San Bernardino, California, U.S.
- Concert hall: California Theatre for the Performing Arts
- Music director: Anthony Parnther
- Website: Official website

The San Bernardino Symphony orchestra is an American symphony orchestra, based in San Bernardino, California. Founded in 1929 by newspaper magnate and conductor, James K. Guthrie, the San Bernardino Symphony is one of the oldest professional orchestras in the state of California. They put on a concert subscription season and many additional performances throughout the region.

In addition to their subscription concerts series, the symphony provides two free concerts for the schools serving over 3,000 students annually, introductory workshops (live and virtual) on orchestral instruments for every local third grade class (approximately 5,000 students annually) in the San Bernardino City USD, and master classes/music workshops for students of all ages. They also offer a certificated Symphony Teens program providing job skills training to local high school students.

The orchestra performs the majority of their season at the historic California Theatre of the Performing Arts. The orchestra's current music director is Anthony Parnther, since 2019.

After a two-year long international search, the San Bernardino Symphony appointed Anthony Parnther music director in 2019, making him one of the only Black conductors of a professional orchestra in the United States.

The symphony maintains a number of education programs and provides an arts experience for many thousands each year.

== Guthrie Music Rental Library ==
The Guthrie Library, owned and operated by the San Bernardino Symphony, is named after Maestro James K. Guthrie.

In 2020, American singer, pianist, and music revivalist Michael Feinstein donated a portion of his personal collection to the Guthrie.

== Conductors and music directors ==
- Jay Plowe (1929–1933)
- James Guthrie (1935–1961)
- Joseph Pearlman (1962–1965)
- Rudolph Picardi (1965–1968)
- Michael Perriere (1968–1976)
- Meredith Willson (1976)
- Alberto Bolet (1976–1980)
- Gregory Millar (1981–1982)
- Thomas Nee (1981)
- Donald Ambroson (1983–1984)
- Dr. Ben Eby (1983–1984)
- Don Th. Jaeger (1983–1984 and 1984)
- Stewart Robertson (1989–2001)
- Carlo Ponti Jr. (2001–2013)
- Frank Fetta (2013–2017)
- Two-Year Conductor Search (2017–2019)
- Anthony Parnther (2019–present)

== Performance Venues ==
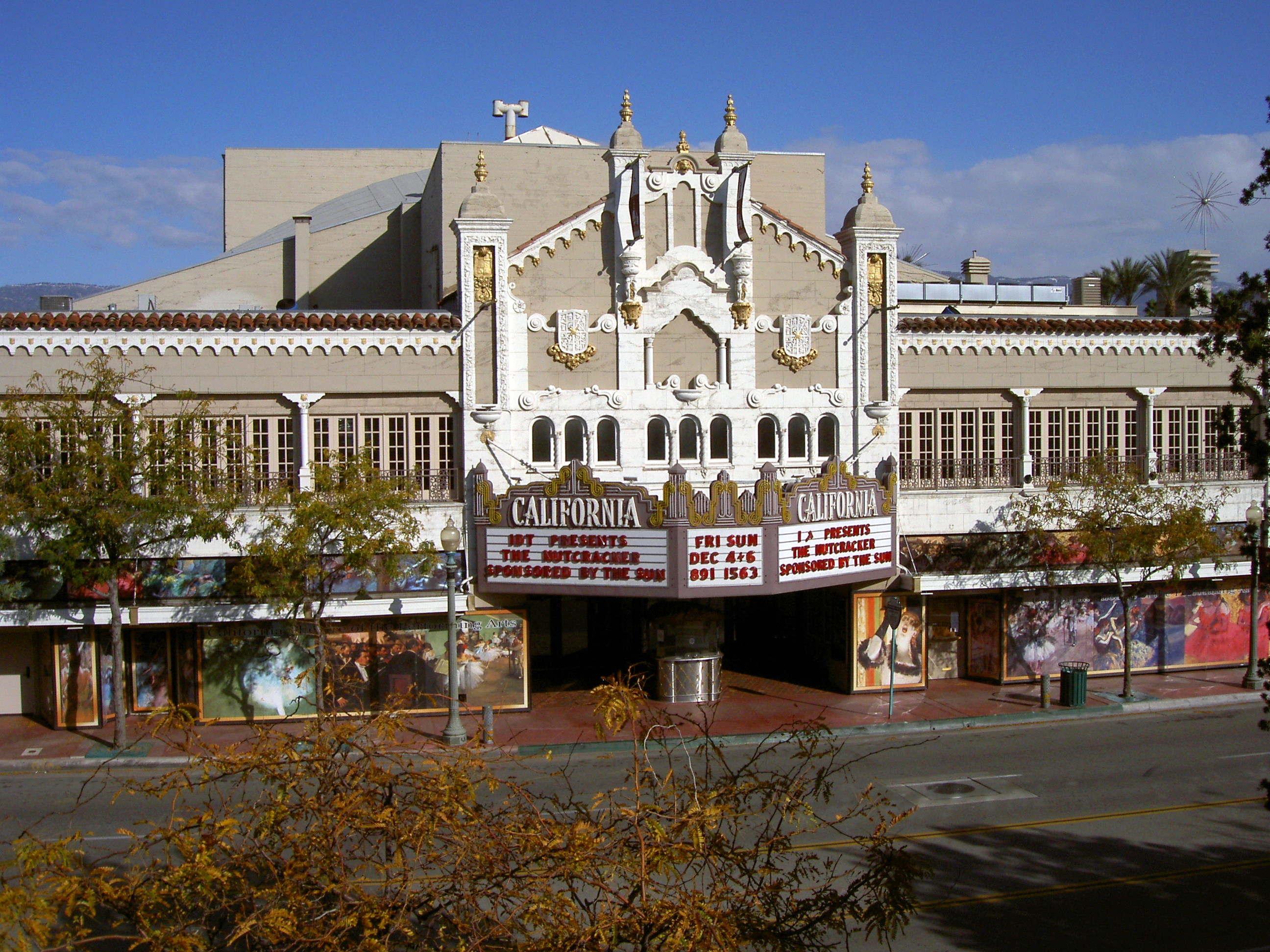
California Theatre (San Bernardino), the San Bernardino Symphony's principal performance venue

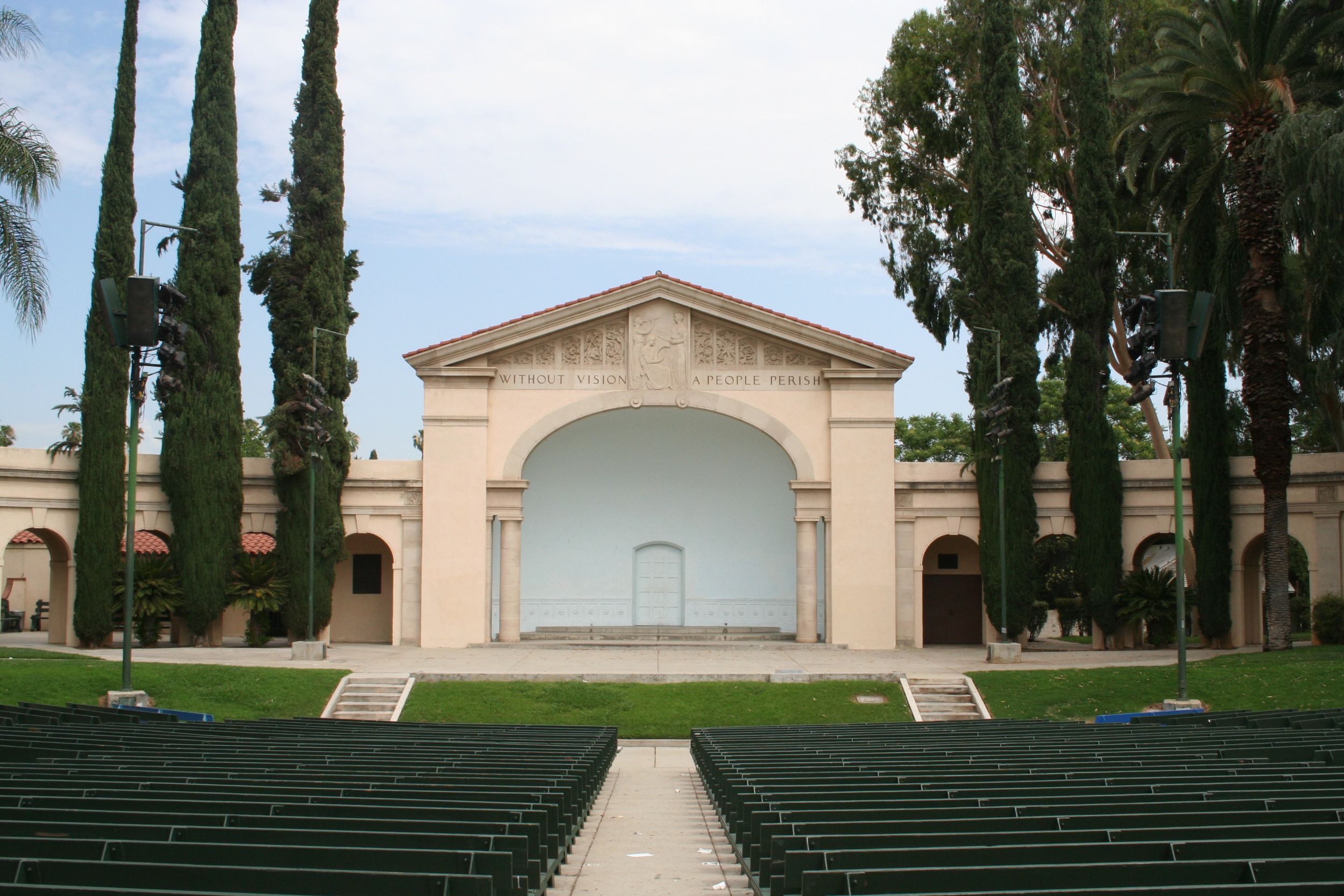
Redlands Bowl, the orchestra performed at the Bowls Summer Music Festival for many years

== Symphony Guild ==
The San Bernardino Symphony Guild was founded in 1984. Activities include Music in the Schools through which symphony docents introduce the instruments of the orchestra to third grade classes in the San Bernardino City Unified School District. The guild also provides post-concert receptions for patrons, they provide refreshments for the musicians, amenities for guest artists, and hold a number of arts-related events throughout each year.
