= Southeast Symphony =

Southeast Symphony Association
- Orchestra
- Founded: 1948
- Concert hall: First Congregational Church of Los Angeles
- Principal conductor: Anthony Parnther

The Southeast Symphony Association is a non-profit, musical and cultural association located in Inglewood, California.

The association was founded in 1948 by music teacher Mabel Massengill Gunn. Gunn's goal was to create an orchestra that welcomed African-American musicians, music teachers and patrons of the arts in an era during which the classical music world was still predominantly segregated. As of 2010, the association's orchestra remains the longest continuously performing primarily African-American orchestra in the world. Alumni of the association's orchestra have gone on to perform with the Los Angeles Philharmonic, the Hollywood Bowl Orchestra, the Minnesota Orchestra and the El Paso Opera Company.

The group currently offers musical classes to students of various ages through the Los Angeles Unified School District. The association has a sponsorship relationship with the Nissan car company. The current music director and conductor of the symphony is Anthony Parnther.
