= List of Virginia state high school football champions =

Virginia state high school football championships

This is a list of the Virginia state high school football champions which have been sanctioned by the Virginia High School League (VHSL).

== List of Virginia state high school football champions ==
Year	Class 6	Class 5	Class 4	Class 3	Class 2	Class 1
2025	Oscar Smith	Maury	Varina	Lake Taylor	Strasburg	Rappahannock
2024	Oscar Smith	Maury	Phoebus	Liberty Christian	Graham	Essex
2023	Freedom (Woodbridge)	Maury	Phoebus	Liberty Christian	Radford	Galax
2022	Freedom (Woodbridge)	Highland Springs	Dinwiddie	Phoebus	Graham	Riverheads
2021	Oscar Smith	Stone Bridge	Varina	Phoebus	King William	Riverheads
2020 (Note: 2020 season played in the spring of 2021 due to COVID-19 pandemic.)	Oscar Smith	Stone Bridge	Salem	Lafayette	Appomattox County	Riverheads
2019	South County	Maury	Lake Taylor	Hopewell	Appomattox County	Riverheads
2018	Manchester	Highland Springs	Woodgrove	Heritage (Lynchburg)	Graham	Riverheads
2017	Westfield	Highland Springs	Salem	Hopewell	Appomattox County	Riverheads
Year	Class 6A	Class 5A	Class 4A	Class 3A	Class 2A	Class 1A
2016	Westfield	Highland Springs	Salem	Blacksburg	Appomattox County	Riverheads
2015	Westfield	Highland Springs	Salem	Magna Vista	Appomattox County	Galax
2014	Ocean Lakes	L.C. Bird	Lake Taylor	Magna Vista	Glenvar	Altavista
2013	Centreville	L.C. Bird	Dinwiddie	Northside	Giles	Altavista
Year	Division 6	Division 5	Division 4	Division 3	Division 2	Division 1
2012	L.C. Bird	Lake Taylor	Briar Woods	Brookville	Goochland	George Wythe (Wytheville)
2011	Oscar Smith	Phoebus	Briar Woods	Brookville	Gretna	Clintwood
2010	Battlefield	Phoebus	Briar Woods	Poquoson	Gate City	Riverheads
2009	Thomas Dale	Phoebus	Broad Run	Northside	Essex	Altavista
2008	Oscar Smith	Phoebus	Broad Run	James Monroe	Gretna	Franklin
2007	Westfield	Stone Bridge	Amherst County	Monticello	Gretna	Buffalo Gap
2006	Osbourn	Phoebus	Amherst County	Richlands	Goochland	Riverheads
2005	Oakton	Hampton	Salem	Turner Ashby	Giles	William Campbell
2004	Landstown	Meadowbrook	Salem	Gretna	Manassas Park	Franklin
2003	Westfield	Hopewell	Powhatan	Gretna	Gate City	Sussex Central
2002	C.D. Hylton	Phoebus	Heritage (Lynchburg)	Liberty (Bedford)	George Wythe (Wytheville)	William Campbell
2001	James W. Robinson	Phoebus	Lafayette	Harrisonburg	Westmoreland	Bath County
2000	Centreville	Heritage (Newport News)	Salem	Rustburg	King William	Riverheads
1999	C.D. Hylton	Culpeper County	Salem	Brookville	Madison County	Surry County
1998	C.D. Hylton	Hampton	Salem	Nottoway	Powell Valley	Surry County
1997	James W. Robinson	Hampton	Spotsylvania	Gate City	Powell Valley	Appalachia
1996	Chantilly	Hampton	Salem	James Monroe	Powhatan	Appalachia
1995	Indian River	Hampton	Amherst County	Graham	Powell Valley	Bath County
1994	Annandale	Patrick Henry (Ashland)	Spotsylvania	John Handley	Powell Valley	Appalachia
1993	Annandale	I.C. Norcom	Rustburg	Jefferson Forest	Giles	Middlesex
1992	Pulaski County	Bethel	Richlands	Jefferson Forest	Central (Lunenburg)	Appalachia
1991	Halifax County	Woodrow Wilson	Spotsylvania	Nottoway	Sussex Central	William Monroe
1990	Gar-Field	West Potomac	Tabb	Rustburg	Powell Valley	King and Queen
1989	West Potomac	Woodrow Wilson	Blacksburg	Graham	Powell Valley	Appalachia
1988	Hampton	E. C. Glass	Park View (Sterling)	Martinsville	Lexington	Jonesville
1987	T. C. Williams	Courtland	Tabb	James Monroe	Central (Lunenburg)	Parry McCluer
1986	Hampton	Thomas Edison	Tazewell	James Monroe	Central (Lunenburg)	Parry McCluer
Year	AAA		AA		A	
1985	Hampton		Courtland		Powell Valley	
1984	T. C. Williams		John Handley		Covington	
1983	Mount Vernon		Courtland		Parry McCluer	
1982	George Washington		Courtland		Powell Valley	
1981	Hampton		Tabb		J. J. Kelly	
1980	Hampton		Giles		Central (Lunenburg)	
1979	Petersburg		Southampton		Parry McCluer	
1978	Annandale		Southampton		Clintwood	
1977	Hampton		Blacksburg		Parry McCluer	
1976	Bethel		Blacksburg		Madison County	
1975	Hampton		Martinsville		Clintwood	
1974	Bethel		Gate City		Clintwood	
1973	Patrick Henry		Southampton		Madison County	
1972	Annandale		Radford		John I. Burton	
1971	T. C. Williams		Radford		Appalachia	
1970	James Wood (Note: James Wood named state champion as only Group AAA school undefeated at 10–0–1.)		Gate City		Chilhowie	

Starting in 1970, the Virginia High School League organized playoffs to determine a state champion in each school size classification.

- 1969 – Hampton
- 1968 – George Washington
- 1967 – Annandale, Douglas Freeman, Princess Anne
- 1966 – Granby
- 1965 – Annandale
- 1964 – Andrew Lewis
- 1963 – Lane
- 1962 – Graham
- 1961 – Highland Springs
- 1960 – Washington & Lee
- 1959 – Norview
- 1958 – Hermitage
- 1957 – Jefferson Senior
- 1956 – Washington & Lee
- 1955 – Norview
- 1954 – Woodrow Wilson
- 1953 – Granby
- 1952 – Thomas Jefferson (Richmond)
- 1951 – Hopewell
- 1950 – Hopewell, Hampton
- 1949 – Hopewell
- 1948 – Hampton
- 1947 – Woodrow Wilson
- 1946 – Granby
- 1945 – Granby
- 1944 – George Washington, Granby, Petersburg
- 1943 – Thomas Jefferson (Richmond)
- 1942 – Hampton
- 1941 – John Marshall
- 1940 – John Marshall
- 1939 – Maury
- 1938 – E.C. Glass
- 1937 – Petersburg
- 1936 – Hampton
- 1935 – Maury
- 1934 – Lane
- 1933 – E.C. Glass
- 1932 – Maury
- 1931 – Newport News
- 1930 – E.C. Glass
- 1929 – Maury, Newport News
- 1928 – Jefferson Senior
- 1927 – Woodrow Wilson
- 1926 – Woodrow Wilson
- 1925 – Newport News
- 1924 – Jefferson Senior
- 1923 – Jefferson Senior
- 1922 – Jefferson Senior
- 1921 – Maury
- 1920 – Newport News

=== Most state football championships ===
Team	Titles	Title Years (Fall)
Hampton Crabbers	17	1936, 1942, 1948, 1950, 1969, 1975, 1977, 1980, 1981, 1985, 1986, 1988, 1995, 1996, 1997, 1998, 2005
Phoebus Phantoms	11	2001, 2002, 2006, 2008, 2009, 2010, 2011, 2021, 2022, 2023, 2024
Salem Spartans	10	1996, 1998, 1999, 2000, 2004, 2005, 2015, 2016, 2017, 2020
Riverheads Gladiators	10	2000, 2006, 2010, 2016, 2017, 2018, 2019, 2020, 2021, 2022

== See also ==
- Virginia High School League
