= Seminole District =

The AA Seminole District is a district in Region III of the Virginia High School League. The schools of the district are located in and around the Lynchburg Metro (Lynchburg, Virginia). US 29, which passes through the area, is named the Seminole Trail through much of Virginia. All current member schools have won at least one state championship in football since 1988.

The Seminole District gained State-wide recognition in the mid-2010s during an ongoing court case between VHSL and Liberty Christian Academy. The case went in favor of LCA, and the school became the first private institution to become a member of VHSL. The Bulldogs soon after became the eighth member of the league.

== Member schools ==
School	Location	Mascot	Colors	2022-23 9–12 enrollment
Amherst County High School	Amherst	Lancers		1,262
Brookville High School	Lynchburg	Bees		925
E. C. Glass High School	Lynchburg	Hilltoppers		1,373
Heritage High School	Lynchburg	Pioneers		1,043
Jefferson Forest High School	Forest	Cavaliers		1,335
Liberty Christian Academy	Lynchburg	Bulldogs		1,853
Liberty High School	Bedford	Minutemen		845
Rustburg High School	Rustburg	Red Devils		865

== Former Members ==
School	Location	Mascot	Colors	2022-23 9–12 enrollment
Altavista High School	Altavista	Colonels		Dogwood
Appomattox County High School	Appomattox	Raiders		Dogwood
Gretna High School	Gretna	Hawks		Dogwood
Staunton River High School	Moneta	Golden Eagles		River Ridge
William Campbell High School	Naruna	Generals		Dogwood
