= Dogwood District =

Virginia high school athletic conference

- Conference: Virginia High School League
- No. of teams: 8
- Region: Class 2 and Class 1

The Dogwood District is a high school athletic conference within the Virginia High School League (VHSL).

The Dogwood District competes in VHSL Region 1B alongside the:

- Bull Run District
- James River District
- Shenandoah District
- Tidewater District
- Tri-Rivers District

== Member schools ==
As of the 2027–31 lineup, the Dogwood District consists of the following eight high schools:

| School | Location | Mascot | Colors |
|---|---|---|---|
| Altavista High School | Altavista, Campbell Country | Colonels | Orange and Black |
| Appomattox County High School | Appomattox, Appomattox County | Raiders | Blue, Gray, and White |
| Chatham High School (Virginia) | Chatnam, Pittsylvania County | Cavaliers | Black and Red |
| Dan River High School | Ringgold, Pittsylvania County | Wildcats | |
| Galileo Magnet High School | Danville, Virginia | Falcons | Red, Blue, and Gray |
| Gretna High School | Gretna, Pittsylvania County | Hawks | Blue and Gray |
| Nelson County High School (Virginia) | Lovingston, Nelson County | Governors | Green and Gold |
| Smith Mountain Lake Christian Academy | Moneta, Virginia, Bedford County | Ospreys | |
| William Campbell High School | Naruna, Campbell County | Generals | |
