= Timberlake, Virginia =

- CDP
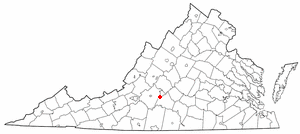
- Location of Timberlake, Virginia
- Coordinates: 37°19′53″N 79°14′52″W
- Country: United States
- State: Virginia
- County: Campbell

Area
  - Total: 11.3 sq mi (29.3 km^{2})
  - Land: 11.2 sq mi (29.0 km^{2})
  - Water: 0.12 sq mi (0.3 km^{2})
- Elevation: 920 ft (280 m)

Population (2020)
  - Total: 13,267
  - Density: 1,180/sq mi (457/km^{2})
- Time zone: UTC−5 (Eastern (EST))
  - Summer (DST): UTC−4 (EDT)
- FIPS code: 51-78688
- GNIS feature ID: 1495150

Timberlake is a census-designated place (CDP) in Campbell County, Virginia, United States. The population was 13,267 at the 2020 census. It is part of the Lynchburg Metropolitan Statistical Area.

== Geography ==
Timberlake is located at 37°19′53″N 79°14′52″W (37.331482, −79.247904).

According to the United States Census Bureau, the CDP has a total area of 11.3 square miles (29.3 km^{2}), of which 11.2 square miles (29.0 km^{2}) is land and 0.12 square miles (0.3 km^{2}), or 1.12%, is water.

=== Climate ===
The climate in this area is characterized by hot, humid summers and generally mild to cool winters. According to the Köppen Climate Classification system, Timberlake has a humid subtropical climate, abbreviated "Cfa" on climate maps.

== Demographics ==
Historical population
Census	Pop.	Note	%±
2000	10,683		—
2010	12,183		14.0%
2020	13,267		8.9%
Source: U.S. Census Bureau

=== 2020 census ===
As of the 2020 census, Timberlake had a population of 13,267. The median age was 38.6 years. 21.6% of residents were under the age of 18 and 19.2% of residents were 65 years of age or older. For every 100 females there were 92.0 males, and for every 100 females age 18 and over there were 89.0 males age 18 and over.

93.4% of residents lived in urban areas, while 6.6% lived in rural areas.

There were 5,588 households in Timberlake, of which 27.3% had children under the age of 18 living in them. Of all households, 46.8% were married-couple households, 18.1% were households with a male householder and no spouse or partner present, and 30.1% were households with a female householder and no spouse or partner present. About 30.0% of all households were made up of individuals and 13.0% had someone living alone who was 65 years of age or older.

There were 5,908 housing units, of which 5.4% were vacant. The homeowner vacancy rate was 1.6% and the rental vacancy rate was 4.3%.

Racial composition as of the 2020 census
Race	Number	Percent
White	10,431	78.6%
Black or African American	1,324	10.0%
American Indian and Alaska Native	40	0.3%
Asian	321	2.4%
Native Hawaiian and Other Pacific Islander	7	0.1%
Some other race	376	2.8%
Two or more races	768	5.8%
Hispanic or Latino (of any race)	709	5.3%

=== 2000 census ===
As of the census of 2000, there were 10,683 people, 4,523 households, and 3,152 families residing in the CDP. The population density was 1,211.8 people per square mile (467.7/km^{2}). There were 4,707 housing units at an average density of 533.9/sq mi (206.1/km^{2}). The racial makeup of the CDP was 91.13% White, 5.42% African American, 0.28% Native American, 1.71% Asian, 0.02% Pacific Islander, 0.47% from other races, and 0.97% from two or more races. Hispanic or Latino of any race were 1.01% of the population.

There were 4,523 households, out of which 29.6% had children under the age of 18 living with them, 57.1% were married couples living together, 9.8% had a female householder with no husband present, and 30.3% were non-families. 25.3% of all households were made up of individuals, and 7.0% had someone living alone who was 65 years of age or older. The average household size was 2.36 and the average family size was 2.83.

In the CDP, the population was spread out, with 22.7% under the age of 18, 8.4% from 18 to 24, 29.8% from 25 to 44, 25.7% from 45 to 64, and 13.5% who were 65 years of age or older. The median age was 38 years. For every 100 females there were 92.7 males. For every 100 females age 18 and over, there were 89.5 males.

The median income for a household in the CDP was $43,094, and the median income for a family was $50,073. Males had a median income of $34,577 versus $24,343 for females. The per capita income for the CDP was $20,760. About 4.5% of families and 5.6% of the population were below the poverty line, including 7.5% of those under the age of 18 and 3.5% of those ages 65 and older.

== Education ==
The CDP is served by Campbell County Public Schools. Public school students residing in Timberlake are zoned to attend Leesville Road or Tomahawk Elementary School, Brookville Middle School, and Brookville High School.
