= Altavista Downtown Historic District =

Historic district in Virginia, United States

- U.S. National Register of Historic Places
- U.S. Historic district
- Virginia Landmarks Register
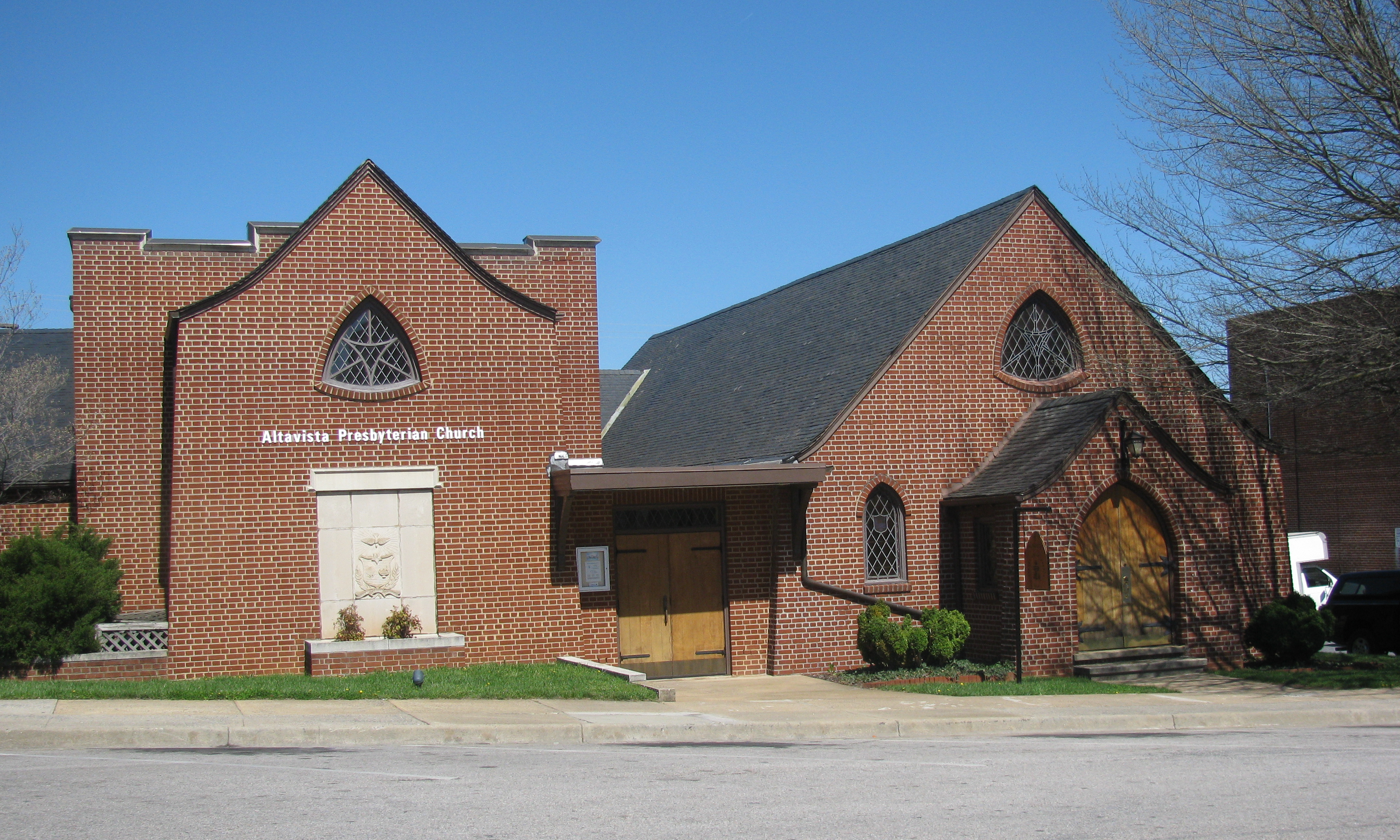
- Altavista Presbyterian Church in 2009

- Location within Virginia Location within the United States
- Location: 400 and 500 blocks of 7th St; 500, 600, and 700 blocks of Broad St; 500 and 600 blocks of Main St; and 400 block of Wash, Altavista, Virginia
- Coordinates: 37.10965°N 79.28946°W
- Area: 14.3 acres (5.8 ha)
- Built: 1907
- Architect: English, W. B.; Johnson, Stanhope
- Architectural style: Romanesque, Late Victorian, 19th- and 20th-century revival
- NRHP reference No.: 10000306
- VLR No.: 162-5005

Significant dates
- Added to NRHP: May 28, 2010
- Designated VLR: March 18, 2010

Altavista Downtown Historic District is a national historic district located at Altavista, Campbell County, Virginia. It encompasses 48 contributing buildings in the central business district of Altavista. Notable buildings include the Altavista Municipal Building (1938), U.S. Post Office (1938), Altavista Presbyterian Church (1925), Central Baptist Church (1927), Southern Railway station (1936), Ogden-Henderson Building (1909), First National Bank (1917) by Stanhope Johnson (1882–1973), Leggett's department store (1933), and Vista Theater (1936).

It was listed on the National Register of Historic Places in 2010.
