= Avoca (Altavista, Virginia) =

Historic house in Virginia, United States

- U.S. National Register of Historic Places
- Virginia Landmarks Register
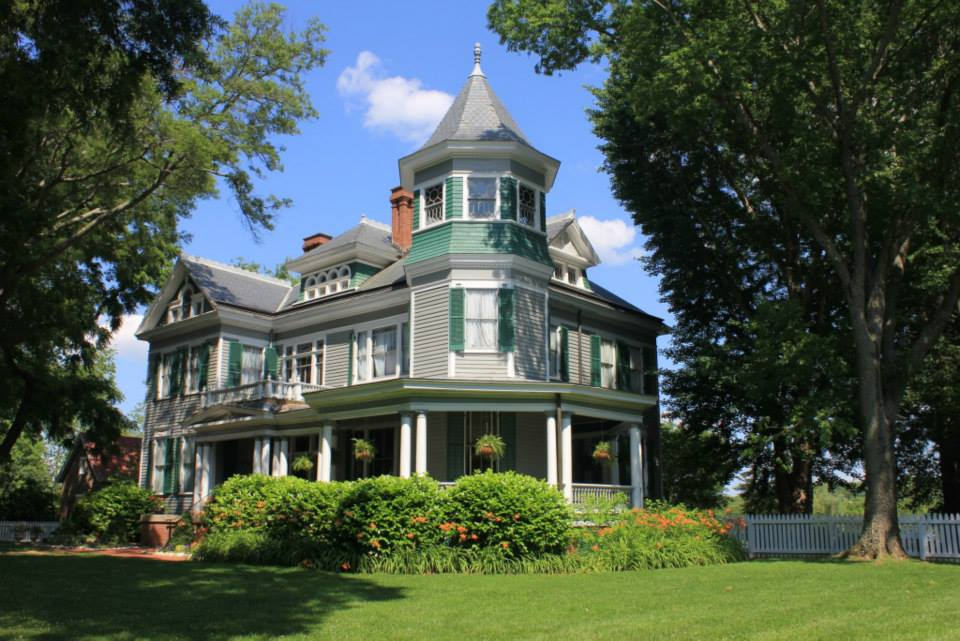

- Location within Virginia Location within the United States
- Interactive map showing the location of Avoca
- Location: N of Altavista on US 29, near Altavista, Virginia
- Coordinates: 37°7′48″N 79°16′12″W
- Area: 3 acres (1.2 ha)
- Built: 1875, 1901
- Architect: Lewis, John Minor Botts
- Architectural style: Queen Anne
- NRHP reference No.: 82004546
- VLR No.: 015-0378

Significant dates
- Added to NRHP: September 16, 1982
- Designated VLR: March 16, 1982

Avoca, also known as Avoca Museum, is a historic home located near Altavista, Campbell County, Virginia. It was designed by Lynchburg architect John Minor Botts Lewis and built in 1901, after the original and second dwellings were destroyed by fire in 1879 and 1900. It is a large 2 1/2-story, asymmetrical, wood-frame residence in the Queen Anne style. It has a hipped roof and features a tower and verandah. Also on the property are a contributing 1 1/2-story brick kitchen, a wood-frame smokehouse, tenants house and office, and family cemetery.

== Property and family history ==
Avoca was originally the private residence of Colonel Charles Lynch (1736–1796). He established his home here in 1755 as part of a land grant from King George II of Great Britain to his father, in 1740, and called it Green Level. Colonel Charles Lynch was a planter and distinguished himself as a lawmaker and soldier during the turbulent times of the American Revolution era. The term "Lynch's Law" (which became "lynching") may derive from his name, although he did not practice lynching in the later, murderous sense of the word.

The property was passed down through the Lynch family and upon the death of Charles Henry Lynch (1800–1875), the property went to his niece, Mary Anna Dearing Fauntleroy. Her grandson, Dr. Lindley Murray Winston, deeded the property to the Town of Altavista in 1981 as a memorial to his family.

It was listed on the National Register of Historic Places in 1982.

== Avoca Museum ==
The Avoca property is maintained as a historical museum. The collection, displays, programs and interpretations are planned to take account of the cultural and natural history of the region. The property is used for education and recreational purposes and serves the people of the greater Altavista area.

Because the house was unoccupied since the mid-1970s, there was need for interior repair before it could be opened to the public. In the meantime, the small Staunton River Valley Museum was opened weekends in the brick kitchen. Prior to its opening, the kitchen, exterior painting of the main house, and seed money were provided by $15,000 grants from E. R. English and Abbott Laboratories.

Gradually, through the generosity of benefactors and hard work of volunteers, one room at a time in the main house was stabilized. Gifts of furniture enhanced the revitalization efforts and in 1986 Avoca opened for tours. Due to the growth of the museum, a need for increased fund-raising, and more volunteer involvement, a historical society was founded in 1987. At this time the Staunton River Valley Museum became Avoca Museum and Historical Society and Rusty Hicks served as its first president.

In 1991 an administrator was hired to oversee issues dealing with current policies, operations, facilities and programs, member recruitment, hiring a director to manage day-to-day operations (hired in 1995), and the feasibility of acquiring or constructing storage, exhibition, and administrating offices.

1991 and 1992 were a watershed for Avoca. The Lane Company, in collaboration with Country Living Magazine, refurbished the main house. Donations of furniture by the Lane Company, fabrics, window treatments, and accessories transformed the house. National and local media coverage expanded visitation and Avoca enjoyed a successful year.

A five-year campaign was launched in 1995 to restore the exterior of the house, rehabilitate the farm office, and expand the school and community outreach programs. Grants were awarded to Avoca by the Commonwealth of Virginia and the Town of Altavista for $30,000 each. The Timken Foundation of Canton provided $85,000 toward the restoration.

== Annual Harvest Jubilee & Wine Festival ==
Held each fall at the Avoca Museum, this festival includes many vineyards from the local area and has grown larger over the past few years. Some wineries that participate are Rebec, Hickory Hills, Tomahawk, Gabriele Rausse, Stonewall, and Peaks of Otter.
