= Rustburg High School =

Location
- 1671 Village Highway; Rustburg, Virginia 24588; United States; 37°16′36″N 79°05′05″W

Information
- School type: Public, High School
- Motto: Rigor. Relevance. Relationship.
- School district: Campbell County Public Schools
- Superintendent: Clayton Stanley
- Principal: Brantley Shields
- Faculty: 57.00 (FTE)
- Grades: 9–12
- Enrollment: 828 (2022-23)
- Student to teacher ratio: 14.53
- Language: English
- Colors: Red, White, Black
- Athletics conference: Virginia High School League; AA Region III; Seminole District
- Mascot: Red Devil
- Rivals: Jefferson Forest High; Brookville High
- Website: rhs.campbell.k12.va.us

Rustburg High School is a public school for grades nine through twelve, in Rustburg, Virginia. It is one of four high schools that are part of the Campbell County Public Schools, along with Altavista High School, Brookville High School, and William Campbell High School.

== History ==
Originally Campbell County High School, the school was Campbell County, Virginia's first public high school, opening in the early 1900s. Until the late 1970s, the school was in the oldest part of the building that is now part of an expanded Rustburg Middle School.

Currently, Rustburg High School is at 1671 Village Highway in Rustburg, where it has been since the move in the late 1970s. Its original building has been expanded multiple times since its opening, the largest of those expansions being the addition of a new science wing that opened in 1997.

In its current location, the school has had four principals. Hugh T. Pendleton is the longest-serving principal in school history; he was in charge from 1963 until his retirement in 1997. The Hugh T. Pendleton award of excellence continues to be awarded at the annual end-of-year awards ceremonies, given by the faculty to the most outstanding senior.

Pendleton was succeeded by then-middle school principal C. Benjamin Arthur, who held the job from 1997 until his retirement in 2002. E. Denton Sisk replaced Arthur in 2002 after serving as an assistant principal, and the school's next principal, Clayton F. Stanley, took over from him in 2011, serving until 2017. Among his other previous positions, Stanley was a teacher and assistant football coach at RHS during the 1990s. Clayton Stanley was promoted to Director of Personnel in 2017, and Amy Hale took over. Amy Hale was an assistant principal at Rustburg before taking the role as Principal.

=== Principals ===
- Hugh T. Pendleton, 1963-1997
- C.Benjamin Arthur, 1997-2002
- E. Denton Sisk, 2002-2011
- Clayton F. Stanley, 2011-2017
- Amy Hale, 2017-2022
- Brantley Shields, 2022-

== Athletics ==
The school's mascot is the Red Devil and its athletic teams participate in the AA Seminole District in the Virginia High School League. Its colors are red, white, and black. Rustburg High School was previously associated with the owl as a mascot, but the only remaining evidence of that nickname is in the school's annual yearbook, which has been known as The Owl since its first publication in 1941.

Historically, the school's biggest athletic successes have come in football and softball. Rustburg's football team won Class AA state championships in 1990, 1993, and 2000, in addition to losing in the finals in 1987 and 1998. In softball, Rustburg claimed the 1993, 1994, 1997, and 2021 Class AA state championships, losing in the finals in 1982 and 1999. The school has Class AA state championships in girls volleyball 1992, 2020 and 2021 and boys track and field 1978 and 2024.

Rustburg's baseball team started to have some success when taken over by head coach Barry Godsey. The Red Devils went to the 2009 Virginia High School League State Championship where they lost to Poquoson High. The next year the Red Devils made it back to the AA Regional III Tournament where they faced a tough loss in the first round. The Red Devils had yet to make it back to the Regional Tournament.

However, in 2015 under the new leadership of head coach Christopher Carr (who is now the PE teacher at Rustburg Elementary School), the Red Devils baseball team furthered their success and went on to accomplish the feat of becoming the AA Regional III Tournament Champions. They were later knocked out in the first round of the state championship. The following year (2016), the Rustburg baseball team went on to lose the Regional title but later came back and accomplished their ultimate goal by winning the 3A State Championship for the first time in school history.

== Other extracurriculars ==
Rustburg's marching band is the Marching Red Devils, which competes in competitions throughout the area.

It is known for its competition cheerleading squad, which placed first in the Seminole District from 2005-2008 and was the Region III champion in 2007.

== See also ==
- List of high schools in Virginia
- AA Seminole District
