= Campbell County Courthouse (Virginia) =

Historic courthouse in Virginia, US

- U.S. National Register of Historic Places
- Virginia Landmarks Register
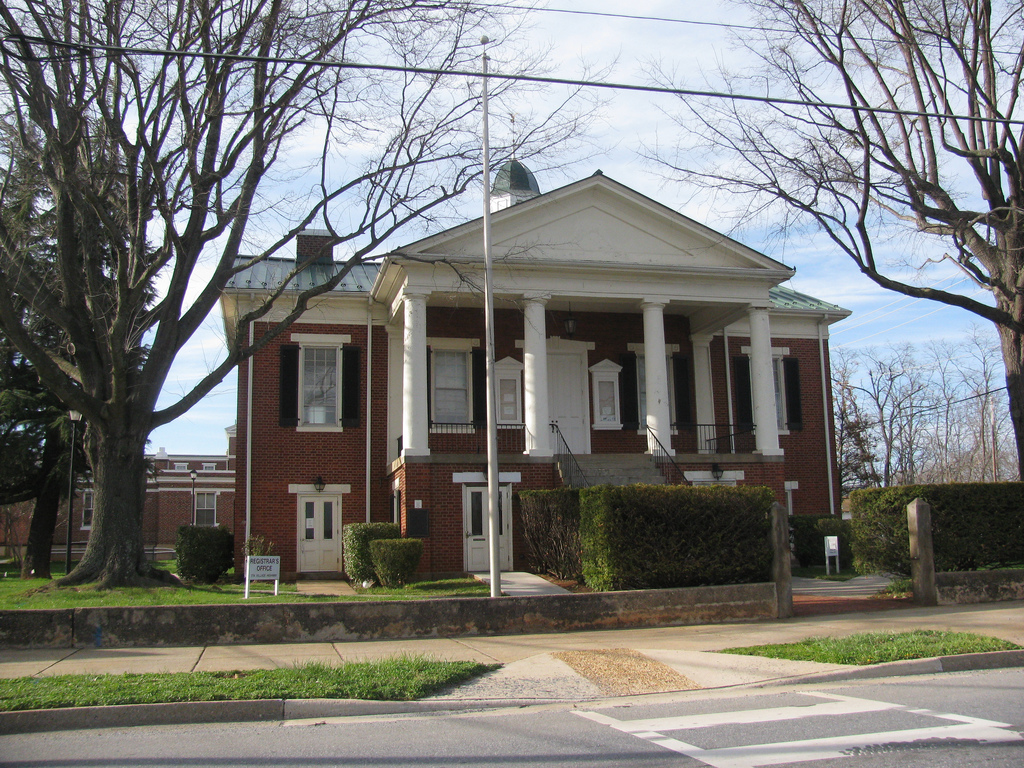
- Campbell County Courthouse, March 2009

- Location within Virginia Location within the United States
- Location: US 501, Rustburg, Virginia
- Coordinates: 37°16′38″N 79°6′3″W
- Area: 1 acre (0.40 ha)
- Built: 1848-1849
- Built by: Wills, John
- Architectural style: Greek Revival
- NRHP reference No.: 81000638
- VLR No.: 015-0001

Significant dates
- Added to NRHP: October 29, 1981
- Designated VLR: June 16, 1981

Campbell County Courthouse is a historic county courthouse located at Rustburg, Campbell County, Virginia. It was built in 1848–1849, and is a two-story T-shaped, brick building in the Greek Revival style. It features a pedimented portico with four unfluted Doric order columns. It has a standing-seam metal cross-gable roof with octagonal cupola.

It was listed on the National Register of Historic Places in 1981.
