= Juan Thornhill =

American football player (born 1995)

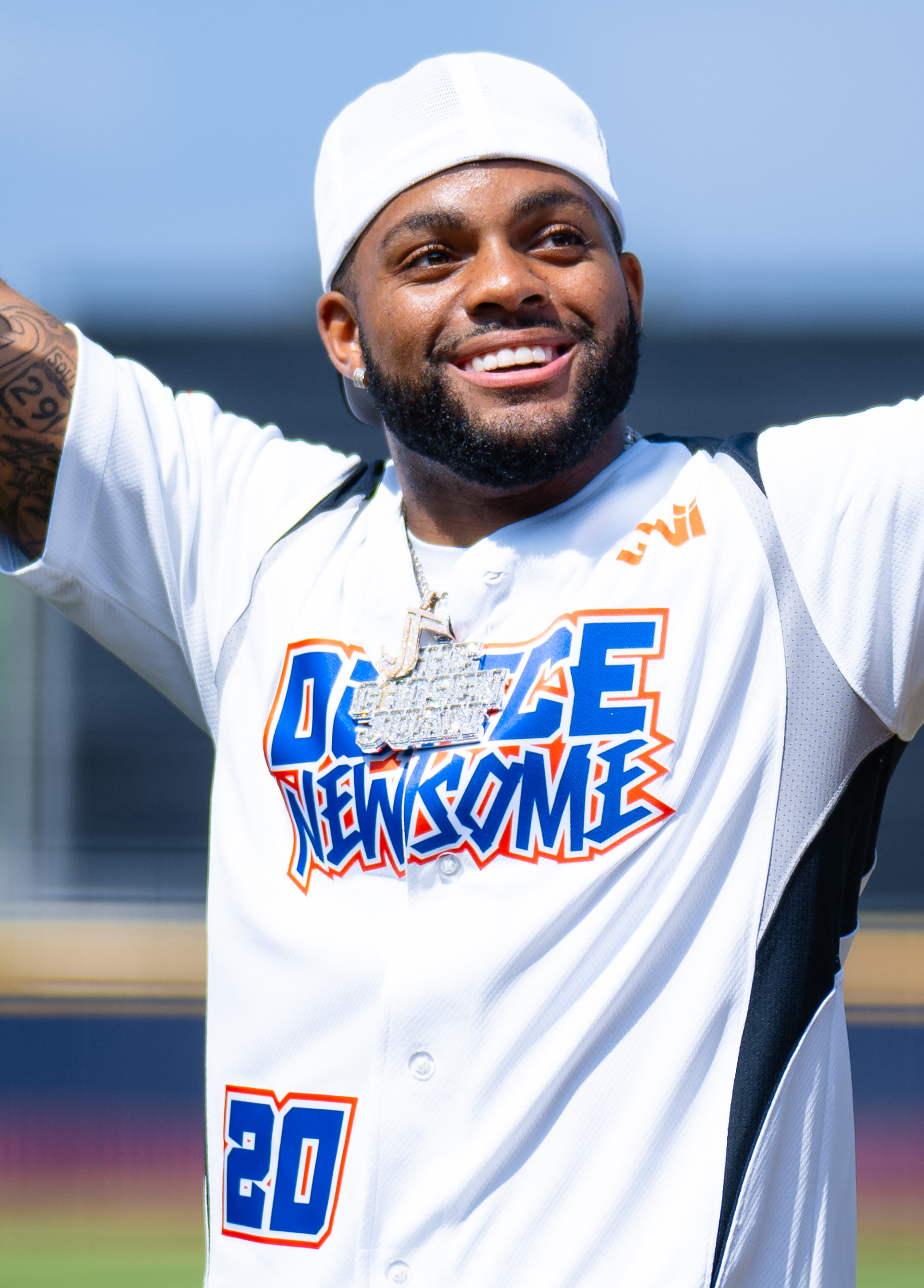
- Thornhill in 2023

Profile
- Position: Safety

Personal information
- Born: October 19, 1995 (age 31); Altavista, Virginia, U.S.
- Listed height: 6 ft 0 in (1.83 m)
- Listed weight: 205 lb (93 kg)

Career information
- High school: Altavista (VA)
- College: Virginia (2015–2018)
- NFL draft: 2019: 2nd round, 63rd overall pick

Career history
- Kansas City Chiefs (2019–2022); Cleveland Browns (2023–2024); Pittsburgh Steelers (2025); Jacksonville Jaguars (2025)

Awards and highlights
- 2× Super Bowl champion (LIV, LVII); PFWA All-Rookie Team (2019); First-team All-ACC (2018); Third-team All-ACC (2017)

Career NFL statistics as of 2025
- Total tackles: 375
- Sacks: 1.0
- Forced fumbles: 1
- Fumble recoveries: 2
- Pass deflections: 25
- Interceptions: 8
- Defensive touchdowns: 1
- Stats at Pro Football Reference

Juan Thornhill (born October 19, 1995) is an American professional football safety. He played college football for the Virginia Cavaliers and was selected by the Kansas City Chiefs in the second round of the 2019 NFL draft. He has also played for the Cleveland Browns and Pittsburgh Steelers.

== Early life ==
Thornhill attended Altavista High School in Altavista, Virginia. He played safety and quarterback in high school. He committed to the University of Virginia to play college football. Thornhill also played basketball in high school.

== College career ==
Thornhill played at Virginia from 2015 to 2018. Thornhill played cornerback and safety at Virginia, where he graduated in December 2018 with a degree in anthropology. During his career, he had 208 tackles, 13 interceptions and 1.5 sack.

== Professional career ==
=== Pre-draft ===
Scouts Inc. ranked Thornhill as the sixth best safety in the draft (60th overall). Pro Football Focus also ranked him sixth best amongst his position. NFL.com analyst and former NFL executive Gil Brandt ranked Thornhill as the third best safety in that year's draft (53rd overall). Sports Illustrated ranked him seventh best among safeties (83rd overall).

Pre-draft measurables
Height	Weight	Arm length	Hand span	Wingspan	40-yard dash	10-yard split	20-yard split	20-yard shuttle	Three-cone drill	Vertical jump	Broad jump	Bench press
6 ft 0 1/4 in (1.84 m)	205 lb (93 kg)	31 1/8 in (0.79 m)	8 3/4 in (0.22 m)	6 ft 2 3/4 in (1.90 m)	4.42 s	1.52 s	2.60 s	4.20 s	6.86 s	44.0 in (1.12 m)	11 ft 9 in (3.58 m)	21 reps
All values from NFL Combine/Pro Day

=== Kansas City Chiefs ===
External videos
- Chiefs draft Thornhill 63rd overall

==== 2019 ====
The Kansas City Chiefs selected Thornhill in the second round (63rd overall) of the 2019 NFL draft. Thornhill was the sixth safety drafted in 2019. The Chiefs originally acquired the second-round pick (63rd overall) during a trade for cornerback Marcus Peters with the Los Angeles Rams in 2018.

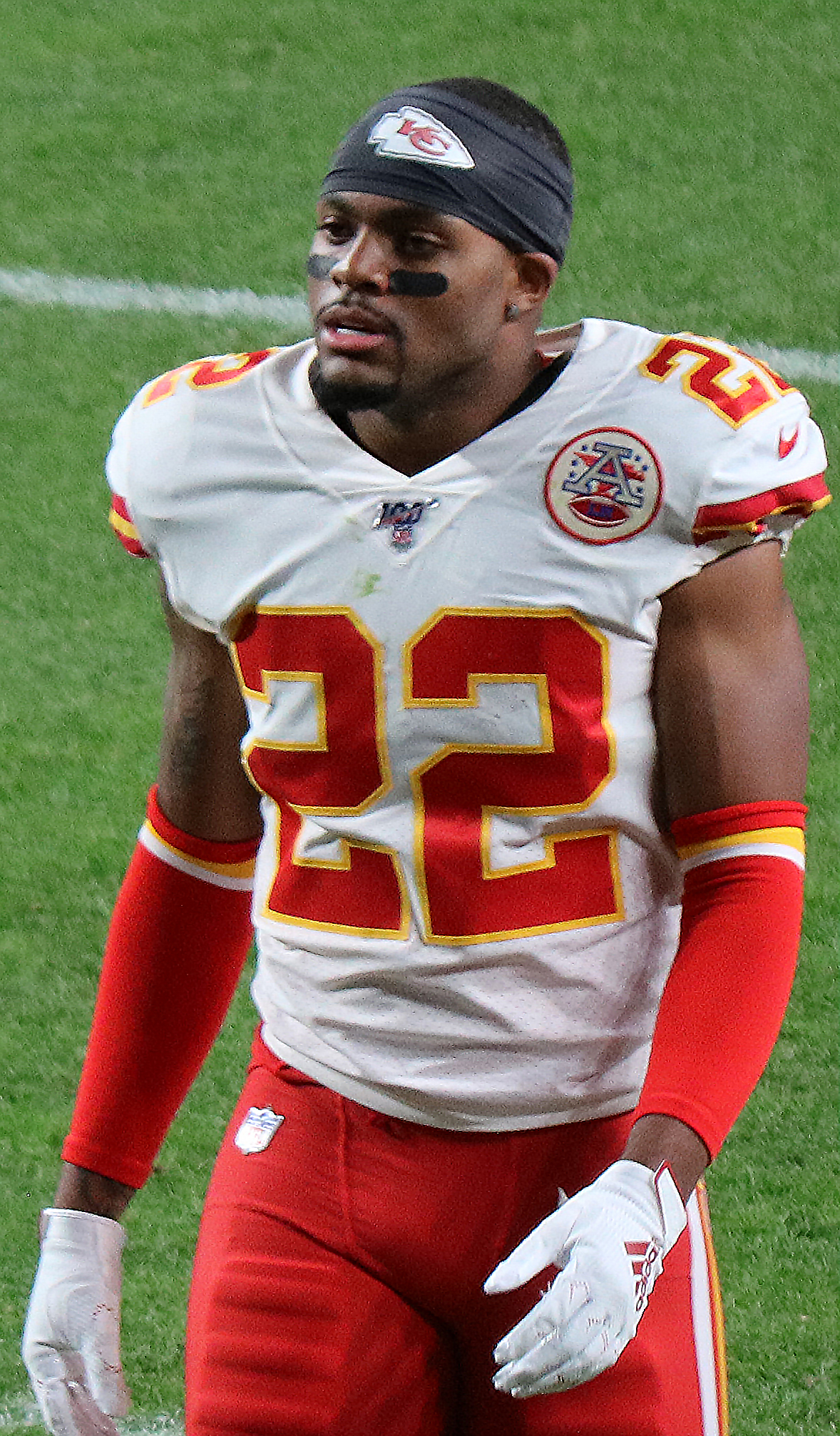
Thornhill with the Chiefs in 2019.

On May 14, 2019, the Kansas City Chiefs signed Thornhill to a four–year, $4.64 million contract that includes $1.79 million guaranteed and an initial signing bonus of $1.37 million. Throughout training camp, Thornhill competed to be the starting free safety against veteran Daniel Sorensen. The role was vacant after the Chiefs released Eric Berry and following the departure of Eric Murray in free agency. Head coach Andy Reid named Thornhill the backup free safety, behind Daniel Sorensen, to begin the regular season.

During pre-game warmups, head coach Andy Reid unexpectedly chose to start Thornhill at free safety immediately after kickoff. He made his first career start in his professional regular season debut in the Kansas City Chiefs' season-opener at the Jacksonville Jaguars and recorded a season-high eight combined tackles (five solo) during a 40–26 victory. He was named the starting free safety moving forward and was paired with starting strong safety Tyrann Mathieu. On October 13, 2019, Thornhill made four solo tackles, a pass deflection, and had his first career interception off a pass thrown by Deshaun Watson to wide receiver Keke Coutee during a 31–24 loss against the Houston Texans. On December 1, 2019, he recorded four combined tackles (three solo), broke up a pass, and intercepted a pass by Derek Carr to wide receiver Tyrell Williams and returned it for 46–yards as the Chiefs routed the Oakland Raiders 40–9. On December 29, 2019, Thornhill tore his left ACL during a 31–21 victory against the Los Angeles Chargers. He finished his rookie campaign with a total of 58 combined tackles (42 solo), five pass deflections, three interceptions, and one touchdown while starting all 16 games. He was named to the PFWA All-Rookie Team.

The Kansas City Chiefs finished the 2019 NFL season first in the AFC West with a 12–4 record, clinching a playoff berth and first round bye. They went on to defeat the Houston Texans and defeated the Tennessee Titans 35–24 in the AFC Championship Game. On February 2, 2020, the Kansas City Chiefs defeated the San Francisco 49ers 31–20 to win Super Bowl LIV. This earned Thornhill his first Super Bowl ring.

==== 2020 ====
On July 31, 2020, the Kansas City Chiefs placed Thornhill on the Active/PUP list to start training camp as he recovered from his ACL surgery. On August 19, 2020, he was re-activated from the Active/PUP list. Defensive coordinator Steve Spagnuolo decided to name Daniel Sorensen and Tyrann Mathieu as the starting safeties with Thornhill listed as the backup safety and nickelback.

On October 5, 2020, Thornhill registered a season-high six solo tackles, broke up a pass, and had his first and lone interception of the season on a pass by Brian Hoyer to tight end Ryan Izzo during a 26–10 win against the New England Patriots. He finished the season with 41 combined tackles (33 solo), three passes deflected, and one interception while appearing in all 16 games with eight starts.

The Kansas City Chiefs continued improving as they finished the 2020 NFL season with a 14–2 record, to earn a playoff berth and first round bye. On January 17, 2021, Thornhill appeared in his first career postseason game, but was limited to one tackle and a pass deflection during a 22–17 victory against the Cleveland Browns in the Divisional Round. The following week, Thornhill had a career-high four pass deflections during a 38–24 victory against the Buffalo Bills in the AFC Championship. On February 7, 2021, Thornhill helped the Chiefs reach Super Bowl LV, but was limited to one solo tackle as the Kansas City Chiefs lost 31–9 to the Tampa Bay Buccaneers.

==== 2021 ====
He entered training camp slated as a backup safety. Head coach Andy Reid named Thornhill a backup to begin the regular season, behind starting duo Daniel Sorensen and Tyrann Mathieu. In Week 7, he collected a season-high nine combined tackles (seven solo) during a 3–27 loss at the Tennessee Titans. On December 5, 2021, Thornhill had six combined tackles (four solo), a pass deflection, and had his only interception of the season on a pass by Teddy Bridgewater to wide receiver Jerry Jeudy during a 9–22 win against the Denver Broncos. He finished the 2021 NFL season with a total of 64 combined tackles (43 solo), three pass deflections, and one interception while appearing in all 17 games with 12 starts.

The Kansas City Chiefs finished the 2021 NFL season atop the AFC West with a 12–5 record. Head coach Andy Reid selected Thornhill to start at free safety throughout the playoffs, alongside Tyrann Mathieu. The Chiefs defeated the Pittsburgh Steelers in the Wild Card Game and defeated the Buffalo Bills 42–36 in the Divisional Round. On January 30, 2022, Thornhill started in the AFC Championship Game and made six combined tackles (two solo) as the Chiefs lost 24–27 to the Cincinnati Bengals.

==== 2022 ====
Throughout training camp, Thornhill competed to be a starting safety after the departures of Daniel Sorensen and Tyrann Mathieu. He competed against Justin Reid and rookie Bryan Cook. He began the regular season as the starting free safety, alongside strong safety Justin Reid.

On October 23, 2022, Thornhill collected a season-high 11 combined tackles (eight solo), one pass deflection, and intercepted a pass thrown by Brock Purdy to Jauan Jennings to seal a 44–23 win at the San Francisco 49ers. He was inactive for a Week 12 victory at the Los Angeles Rams due to a calf injury. He finished the season with a total of 71 combined tackles (43 solo), nine pass deflections, three interceptions, and one sack in 16 games and 16 starts.

The Kansas City Chiefs finished the 2022 NFL season first in the AFC West with a 14–3 record to earn a first round bye. On January 21, 2023, he made five combined tackles (three solo) and a season-high tying two pass deflections during a 27–20 win against the Jacksonville Jaguars in the Divisional Round. The following game, the Chiefs defeated the Cincinnati Bengals 23–20 in the AFC Championship Game. On February 12, 2023, Thornhill started at free safety in Super Bowl LVII and made five combined tackles (three solo) and a pass deflection as the Chiefs defeated the Philadelphia Eagles 38–35. This earned him his second Super Bowl ring.

=== Cleveland Browns ===
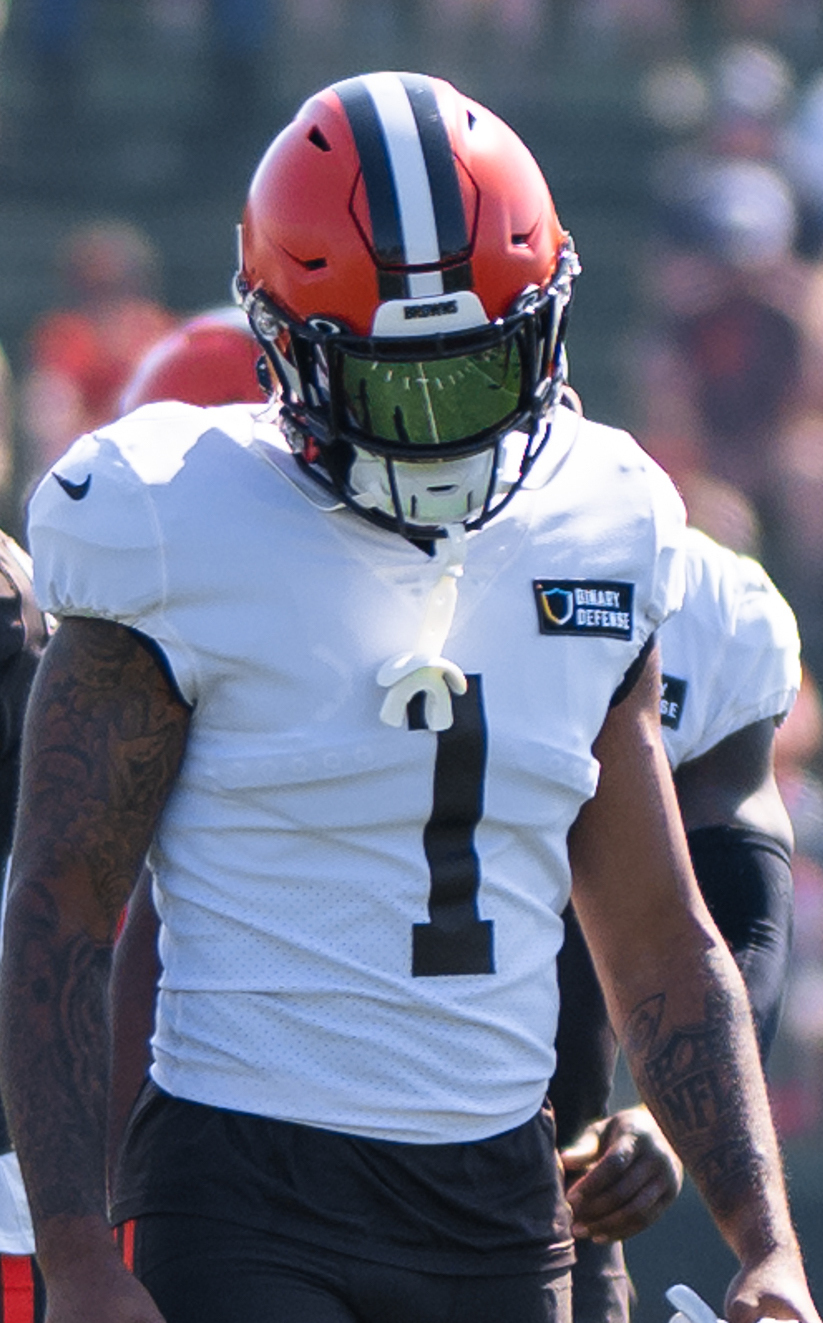
Thornhill at Browns training camp in 2023

==== 2023 season ====
On March 16, 2023, the Cleveland Browns signed Thornhill to a three–year, $21.00 million contract that includes $14.00 million guaranteed and $8.50 million guaranteed upon signing. He was signed as a free agent in order to replace John Johnson III at free safety.

Head coach Kevin Stefanski officially named Thornhill the starting free safety to begin the regular season, alongside strong safety Grant Delpit. He was inactive for the Cleveland Browns' home-opener against the Cincinnati Bengals after injuring his calf. In Week 8, he collected a season-high seven combined tackles (six solo) during a 20–24 loss against the Seattle Seahawks. He was inactive for three consecutive games (Weeks 14–16) after reaggravating his calf injury. He had 54 combined tackles (41 solo) and one pass deflection in 11 games and 11 starts.

==== 2024 season ====
Thornhill entered training camp slated as the starting free safety under defensive coordinator Jim Schwartz. Head coach Kevin Stefanski named Thornhill and Grant Delpit as the starting safeties with Rodney McLeod as the nickelback. On September 8, 2024, Thornhill collected a season-high nine combined tackles (eight solo) during a 17–33 loss against the Dallas Cowboys. On September 11, 2024, the Cleveland Browns placed Thornhill on injured reserve after reaggravating his calf injury in Week 1. On October 16, 2024, the Cleveland Browns officially designated him to return after he missed five consecutive games (Weeks 2–6). He was sidelined during a Week 13 loss at the Denver Broncos due to another injury to his calf. He finished with 49 combined tackles (31 solo) and three pass deflections while starting in all 11 games he appeared in.

On February 24, 2025, Thornhill was released by the Browns after two seasons.

=== Pittsburgh Steelers ===
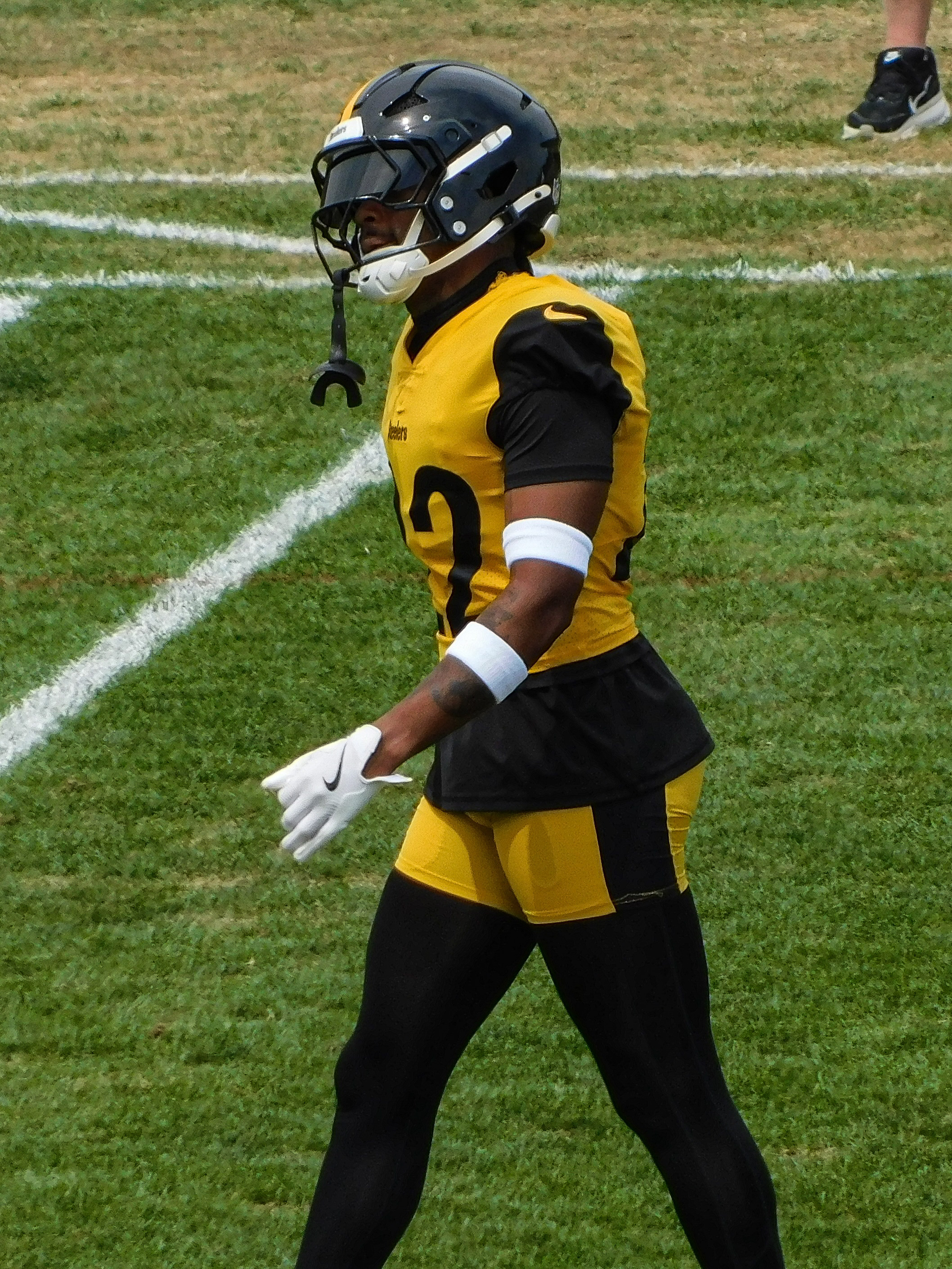
Thornill at Pittsburgh Steelers training camp in 2025

On March 19, 2025, Thornhill signed with the Pittsburgh Steelers on a one-year deal. Following the pre-season, he was named the team's starting free safety ahead of Miles Killebrew.

During the season, Thornhill underperformed despite his status as a starter. In nine games played, he made 38 tackles (23 solo, 15 assisted), averaging about 4.2 per game. Additionally, he only defended one pass, which came in a 24–21 win over the Minnesota Vikings. After a 25–10 loss to the Chargers in which Thornhill had just one tackle, he was released by the Steelers on November 10.

=== Jacksonville Jaguars ===
On November 17, 2025, Thornhill was signed to the practice squad of the Jacksonville Jaguars.
