= Chatham High School (Virginia) =

Public school in Virginia, United States

Location
- 100 Cavalier Circle; Chatham, Virginia; 36°47′17″N 79°24′7″W

Information
- Type: Public
- Established: 1964
- School district: Pittsylvania County Public Schools
- Superintendent: Dr. Steve Mayhew
- Principal: Angela Anderpoint
- Grades: 9 to 12
- Enrollment: 609 (2023-2024)
- Student to teacher ratio: 15.1:1
- Colors: Black and Red
- Slogan: Preparing students for tomorrow, today.
- Athletics conference: Dogwood District
- Mascot: Cavalier
- Team name: Chatham Cavaliers
- Rival: Tunstall High School, Gretna Senior High School, Dan River High School
- Website: www.pcs.k12.va.us/chs

Chatham High School is a public high school in Chatham, Virginia. Average attendance is 650 students per year. Between 2008 and 2010, it was renovated along with other Pittsylvania County schools – Tunstall High School, Dan River High School, and Gretna High School. Chatham High School is named for William Pitt, Earl of Chatham.

== Clubs ==
Chatham High School has several clubs, including:

- Beta Club
- Interact Club
- Foreign Language Club
- Project Discovery
- FIRST Robotics
- Band & Chorus
- FCCLA
- FBLA
- DECA
- FCA
- SCA
- Chess
- FFA
- ACE
- Anime/Manga Club
- Drama Club
- JROTC

== Teams ==
Chatham High School has many sports teams, including:

- Soccer (Male and Female)
- Cross-Country (Co-ed)
- Track (Co-ed)
- Football
- Basketball (Male and Female)
- Volleyball (Female)
- Golf (Co-ed)
- Baseball (Male)
- Softball (Female)
- Marching Band
- Colorguard
- Wrestling (Co-ed)
- Cheerleading

== Cavalier Battalion JROTC ==
The Chatham High School Cavalier Battalion is one of four JROTC programs in Pittsylvania County Schools. It was established in the 1994-95 school year.

=== Teams ===
- Drill
- Rifle
- Raider
- Color Guard
- JLAB
