= Altavista, Virginia =

- Town
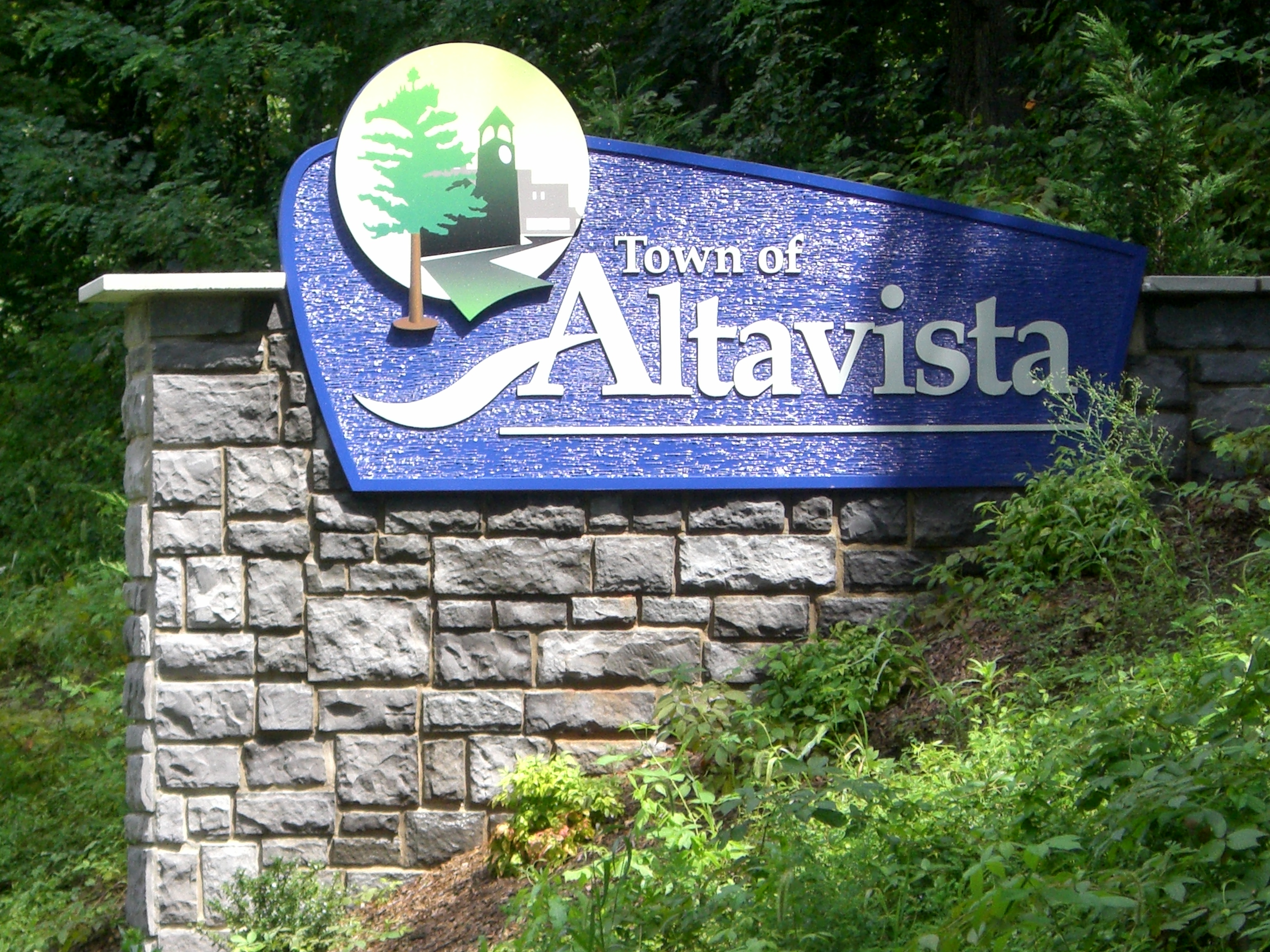
- Altavista welcome sign

- Flag Logo
- Nickname: A-Town
- Motto: "Treasured past, Innovative future."
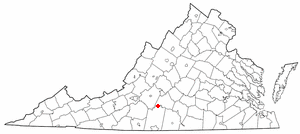
- Location of Altavista, Virginia
- Coordinates: 37°7′3″N 79°17′23″W
- Country: United States
- State: Virginia
- County: Campbell
- Planned: 1905
- First settled: September 9th, 1907
- Incorporated: September 1912
- Founded by: The Lane Company
- Named after: The Lane Family farm

Government
  - Type: Mayor-council government
  - Mayor: Mike Mattox

Area
  - Total: 5.24 sq mi (13.58 km^{2})
  - Land: 5.13 sq mi (13.28 km^{2})
  - Water: 0.11 sq mi (0.29 km^{2})
- Elevation: 548 ft (167 m)

Population (2020)
  - Total: 3,378
  - Estimate (2021): 3,396
  - Density: 664/sq mi (256.4/km^{2})
- Time zone: UTC−5 (Eastern (EST))
  - Summer (DST): UTC−4 (EDT)
- ZIP code: 24517
- Area code: 434
- FIPS code: 51-01528
- GNIS feature ID: 1462426
- Website: www.altavistava.gov

Altavista is an incorporated town in Campbell County, Virginia, United States. The town is in the Lynchburg Metropolitan Area, with a population of 3,378 in the 2020 census. It was founded in 1907 by John Edward Lane and Henry L. Lane of the Lane Company, and was chartered in September 1912.

== History ==
=== Colonial Period ===
==== Pre-colonial ====
Prior to the colonization of Virginia, the area around what would be Altavista was inhabited by the native Saponi people, in a tribal town that was called "Sapon Town", near what is now the Staunton River. The Saponi cleared a large networks of paths through the forests to connect their villages, inadvertently enabling colonists to come through the area with ease. The more hostile Occaneechi people were also present in the area, and killed some of the first colonizers in the area. Cherokee and Iroquois people also came through the area.

=== Founding ===
In 1905, John and Henry Lane's firm, The Lane Brothers Construction Company, had been awarded a contract to build 51 kilometers of railroad between Leesville and The Mansion for the Tidewater Railway Company, which was incorporated by William Nelson Page and Henry Huttleston Rogers. This railroad would also intersect the Southern Railway.

Recognizing the excellent location for a new town, the Lane Company bought 2000 acres of land around the intersection and started planning a town named Lane's Siding. On September 9, 1907, the first settlers arrived in the town of Lane's Siding in a small red caboose. A firsthand account of the early settlement of the town was written by Mrs. E. G. Fitzgerald:

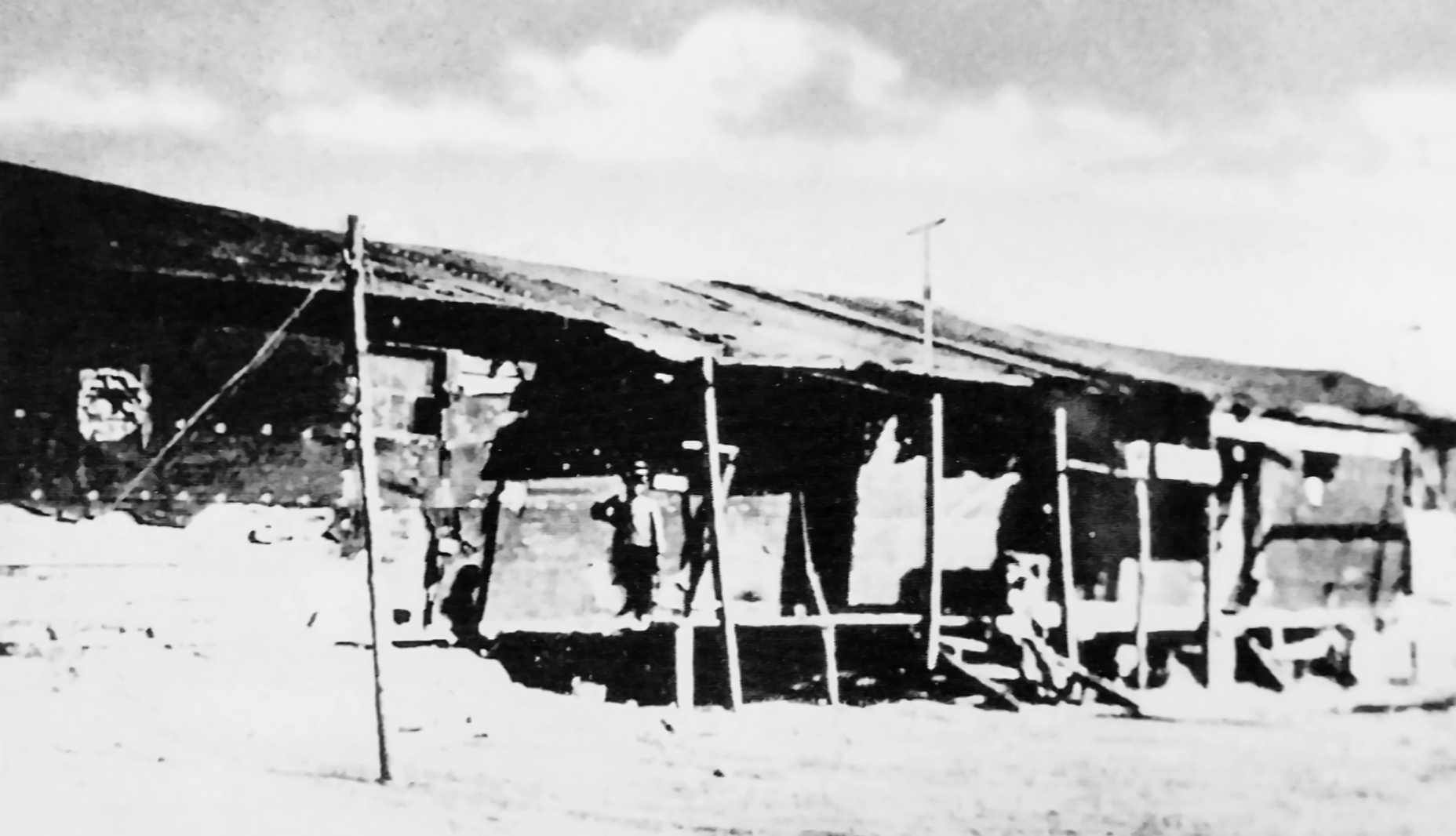
A photo of one of the first houses in Altavista, ~1907

When I first came to Altavista there wasn't hardly any body living there. There was the foundation to two stores. Then people began to come and build houses and stores. Then they built a hold and two depots. After awhile some people built a house and used it for a church. They used it for a school house too. Now there are about one thousand people here.

Between July 1908 and May 1909, the town of Lane's Siding, which (after a hat toss in one of the company bungalows) was renamed to Altavista after the Lane family farm near Charlottesville, had grown rapidly, with a "$100,000 machine shop, a $20,000 foundry and iron working plant, a $15,000 wood working plant, a $15,000 brick and tile making plant, a banking building and the home office of a $2,000,000 contracting and railway building company, a half dozen stores, a water works plant, an electrict lighting plant, a $30,000 hotel nearing completion, and about fifty residences" all being built in under a year.

In September 1912, the town of Altavista had been incorporated

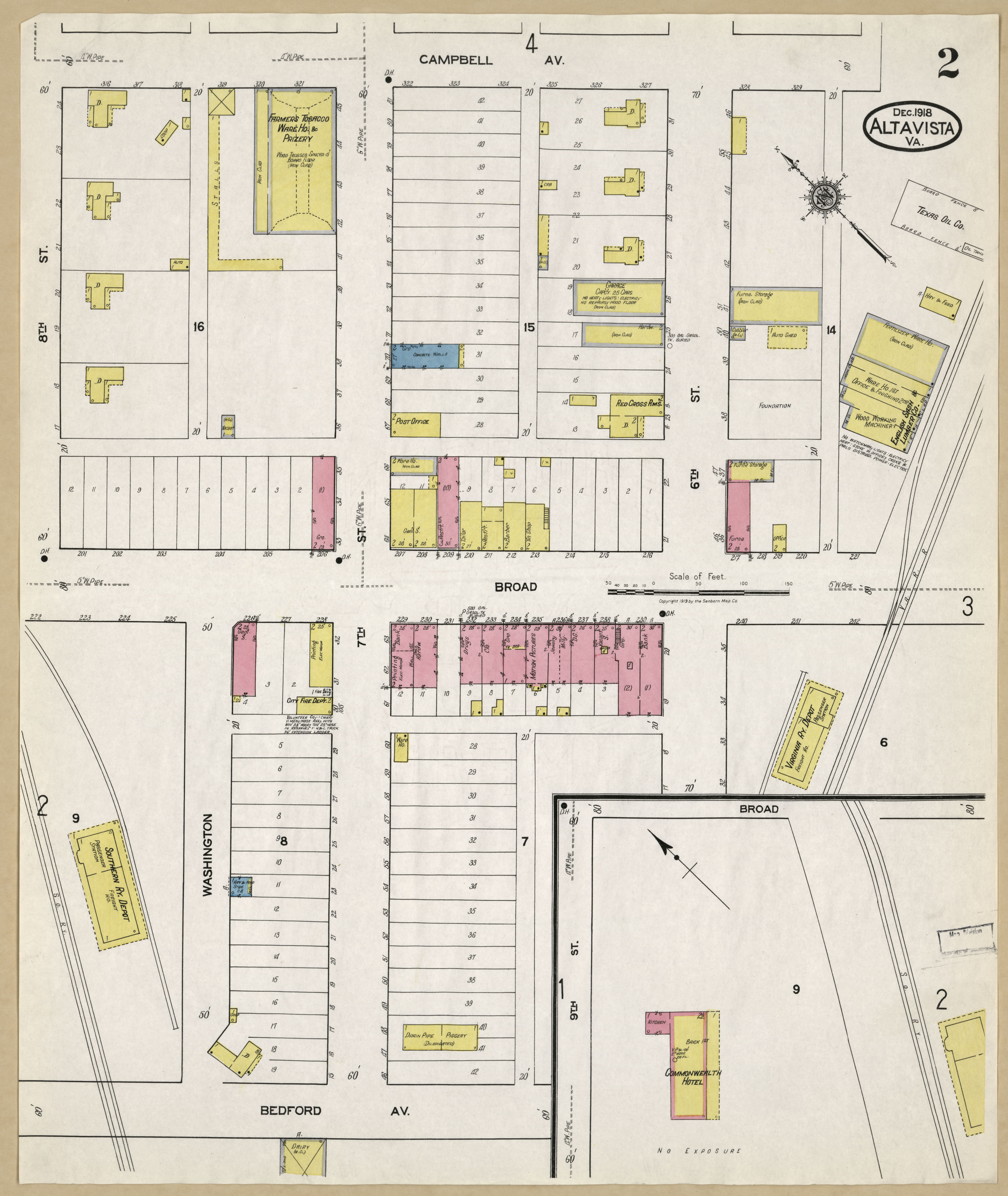
Sanborn Fire Insurance map of Altavista

==== Lane Home Furnishings ====
In March 1912, John Edward Lane had bought a small box company which had gone bankrupt in an auction for $500, and put his son Edward Hudson Lane in charge of the facility even though he had no experience in the field. Because of how uncertain this new venture was, it was simply incorporated as the Standard Red Cedar Chest Company.

During World War I, the company was contracted to build ammunition boxes for the military. To meet demand, an "efficient assembly system" was introduced at the factory. Although the war was a setback for the company, they were able to sustain itself with capital from the Peoples Bank of Charlottesville, and after the war, they enjoyed great success mass-producing cedar chests. In 1922, the company was renamed to The Lane Company. The company expanded to television cabinets, tables, bedroom furniture, and recliners throughout the mid-20th century.

The Lane Company was most famous for their Lane cedar chests made at the original plant in Altavista. In 1992, The Lane Company's parent company, Furniture Brands International, filed for bankruptcy, and the Lane Company was slated for transfer abroad. In the summer of 2001, the last Lane Cedar Chest was manufactured, and the plant was shut down. The plant is now currently a brownfield, with some of the buildings being used by other companies. In 2006, a fire occurred in a vacant section of the plant.

== Historic sites ==
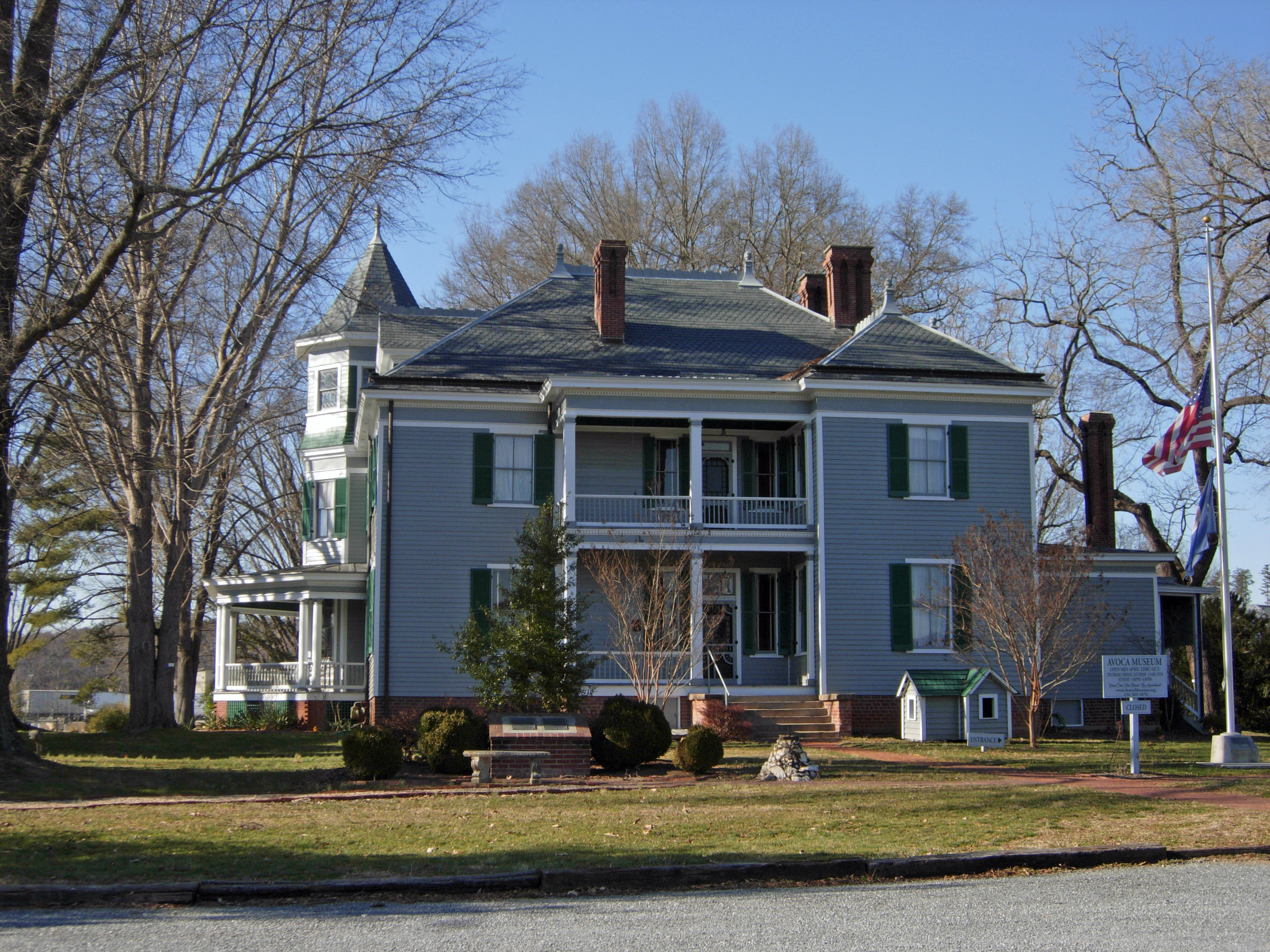
The Avoca Museum

The Avoca Museum and Altavista Downtown Historic District are listed on the National Register of Historic Places.

== Government ==
The current mayor of Altavista is Mike Mattox, a former teacher and local businessman; the Vice-Mayor is Reggie Bennett. There are five elected members of the Town Council.

== Geography ==
Altavista is located in southwestern Campbell County at 37°7′3″N 79°17′23″W (37.117622, −79.289632). It is bordered to the south by the Roanoke River, which forms the boundary with Pittsylvania County. The town of Hurt is directly to the south across the river.

U.S. Route 29, a four-lane expressway, forms the northern border of the town and provides access from four exits. US 29 leads north 25 miles (40 km) to Lynchburg and south 43 miles (69 km) to Danville.

According to the United States Census Bureau, Altavista has a total area of 5.0 square miles (13.0 km^{2}), of which 4.9 square miles (12.7 km^{2}) is land and 0.12 square miles (0.3 km^{2}), or 2.24%, is water.

== Demographics ==
Historical population
Census	Pop.	Note	%±
1920	1,206		—
1930	2,367		96.3%
1940	2,919		23.3%
1950	3,332		14.1%
1960	3,299		−1.0%
1970	2,708		−17.9%
1980	3,849		42.1%
1990	3,686		−4.2%
2000	3,425		−7.1%
2010	3,450		0.7%
2020	3,378		−2.1%
U.S. Decennial Census

=== 2020 census ===
As of the 2020 census, Altavista had a population of 3,378. The median age was 41.6 years. 22.6% of residents were under the age of 18 and 21.4% of residents were 65 years of age or older. For every 100 females there were 78.5 males, and for every 100 females age 18 and over there were 74.7 males age 18 and over.

96.1% of residents lived in urban areas, while 3.9% lived in rural areas.

There were 1,474 households in Altavista, of which 28.3% had children under the age of 18 living in them. Of all households, 34.7% were married-couple households, 17.4% were households with a male householder and no spouse or partner present, and 41.4% were households with a female householder and no spouse or partner present. About 35.8% of all households were made up of individuals and 16.3% had someone living alone who was 65 years of age or older.

There were 1,637 housing units, of which 10.0% were vacant. The homeowner vacancy rate was 2.6% and the rental vacancy rate was 5.8%.

Racial composition as of the 2020 census
Race	Number	Percent
White	2,151	63.7%
Black or African American	987	29.2%
American Indian and Alaska Native	3	0.1%
Asian	25	0.7%
Native Hawaiian and Other Pacific Islander	0	0.0%
Some other race	40	1.2%
Two or more races	172	5.1%
Hispanic or Latino (of any race)	83	2.5%

=== 2000 census ===
As of the 2000 census, there were 3,425 people, 1,502 households, and 940 families residing in the town. The population density was 699.9 people per square mile (270.2 people/km^{2}). There were 1,650 housing units at an average density of 337.2 units per square mile (130.2 units/km^{2}). The racial makeup of the town was 74.25% White, 24.55% African American, 0.09% Native American, 0.20% Asian, 0.32% from other races, and 0.58% from two or more races. Hispanic or Latino of any race were 0.93% of the population.

There were 1,502 households, out of which 26.2% had children under the age of 18 living with them, 42.7% were married couples living together, 16.9% had a female householder with no husband present, and 37.4% were non-families. 34.2% of all households were made up of individuals, and 17.5% had someone living alone who was 65 years of age or older. The average household size was 2.23 and the average family size was 2.86.

In the town, the population was spread out, with 22.5% under the age of 18, 6.7% from 18 to 24, 23.7% from 25 to 44, 25.3% from 45 to 64, and 21.8% who were 65 years of age or older. The median age was 43 years. For every 100 females, there were 77.6 males. For every 100 females age 18 and over, there were 71.8 males.

The median income for a household in the town was $31,818, and the median income for a family was $40,039. Males had a median income of $32,017 versus $22,140 for females. The per capita income for the town was $17,997. About 13.6% of families and 13.5% of the population were below the poverty line, including 14.4% of those under age 18 and 16.7% of those age 65 or over.

== Education ==
The public schools are operated by Campbell County Public Schools.

=== Altavista High School Team State Championships ===
Sports teams from Altavista High School have won several state championships in recent years.

- Boys Basketball 2015 1A, Defeated Honaker Tigers 57–44
- Football 2014 1A, Defeated Essex Trojans 22–20
- Boys Basketball 2014 1A, Defeated Radford Bobcats 49–44
- Football 2013 1A, Defeated Essex Trojans 21–0
- Boys Basketball 2013 Group A, Division 1, Defeated West Point Pointers 80–62
- Boys Cross Country 2010 Group A
- Football 2009 Group A, Division 1, Defeated J.I. Burton Raiders 27–7
- Girls Softball 2009 Group A, Defeated Glenvar Highlanders 7–1
- Girls Basketball 2004 Single A, Defeated Radford Bobcats 50–39
- Boys Basketball 2004 Single A, Defeated Riverheads 54–37
- Girls Volleyball 2002 Single A

== Climate ==
The climate in this area is characterized by hot, humid summers and generally mild to cool winters. According to the Köppen Climate Classification system, Altavista has a humid subtropical climate, abbreviated "Cfa" on climate maps.

== Notable person ==
- Juan Thornhill, NFL safety
