= Amherst County High School =

Coordinates: 37°34′11.5″N 79°3′31.2″W

Location
- 139 Lancer Lane; Amherst, Virginia 24521; United States

Information
- School type: Public high school
- Founded: 1955
- Locale: Rural, Distant
- School district: Amherst County Public Schools
- NCES District ID: 5100210
- Superintendent: William Wells and Dana Norman
- NCES School ID: 510021000065
- Principal: Joey Crawford
- Teaching staff: 86.38 (on an FTE basis)
- Grades: 9–12
- Enrollment: 1,240 (2024–25)
- Student to teacher ratio: 14.36
- Language: English
- Colors: Maroon and gray
- Athletics conference: Seminole District 4 Region III
- Mascot: Lancer
- Website: achs.amherst.k12.va.us

Amherst County High School is a public high school, grades 9–12, serving Amherst County, Virginia, United States. As the only high school in the county, it offers a comprehensive program from Advanced Placement (AP) classes to classes offered through a reciprocity program with local colleges that allow students to earn both high school and college credit at the same time. In addition to the academic program, the school has a comprehensive vocational-technical department that includes welding (offering certification), auto mechanics, LPN nursing (certification offered), EMT-B (certification offered), masonry, carpentry and agriculture.

== Notable alumni ==
- Buddy Bailey, minor league baseball manager
- Jesse Best (2013), artist, writer, and actor - best known for script supervision work on The Road (2009 film)
- Ken Dixon (1978), professional baseball player for the Baltimore Orioles
- Will Rucker (2010), theatrical production artist, who studied at Yale.
- Jesse Stinnett (2013), minor league baseball player (RHP) for the Colorado Rockies organization.
- Pierre Thomas (1980), journalist
- Randy Tomlin (1985), professional baseball player for the Pittsburgh Pirates
- Nathan Trevillian (2015), professional baseball player for the Pittsburgh Pirates Organization.
