= Gretna High School =

Location
- 100 Gretna Hawk Circle; Gretna, Virginia; 36°56′46″N 79°22′5″W

Information
- Type: Public
- Established: 1964
- School district: Pittsylvania County Public Schools
- Principal: Franklin Ferguson
- Faculty: 45.0 (on FTE basis)
- Grades: 9 to 12
- Enrollment: 550 (2023-24)
- Student to teacher ratio: 14.8:1
- Colors: Blue and Gold
- Mascot: Hawk
- Team name: Gretna Hawks
- Website: www.pcs.k12.va.us/ghs

Gretna High School is a public high school in Gretna, Virginia. As of 2024, the school has approximately 550 students enrolled.

== History ==
Between 2008 and 2010, it was renovated along with other Pittsylvania County schools: Tunstall Sr. High School, Dan River High School, and Chatham High School.

Gretna High School has won five Virginia football state championships since 2003.

== Sports ==
Gretna High School has many sports teams, including:

- Cross-Country
- Track
- Football
- Basketball
- Volleyball
- Golf
- Baseball
- Softball
- Cheerleading
