= Tunstall High School =

Public school in Pittsylvania County, Virginia

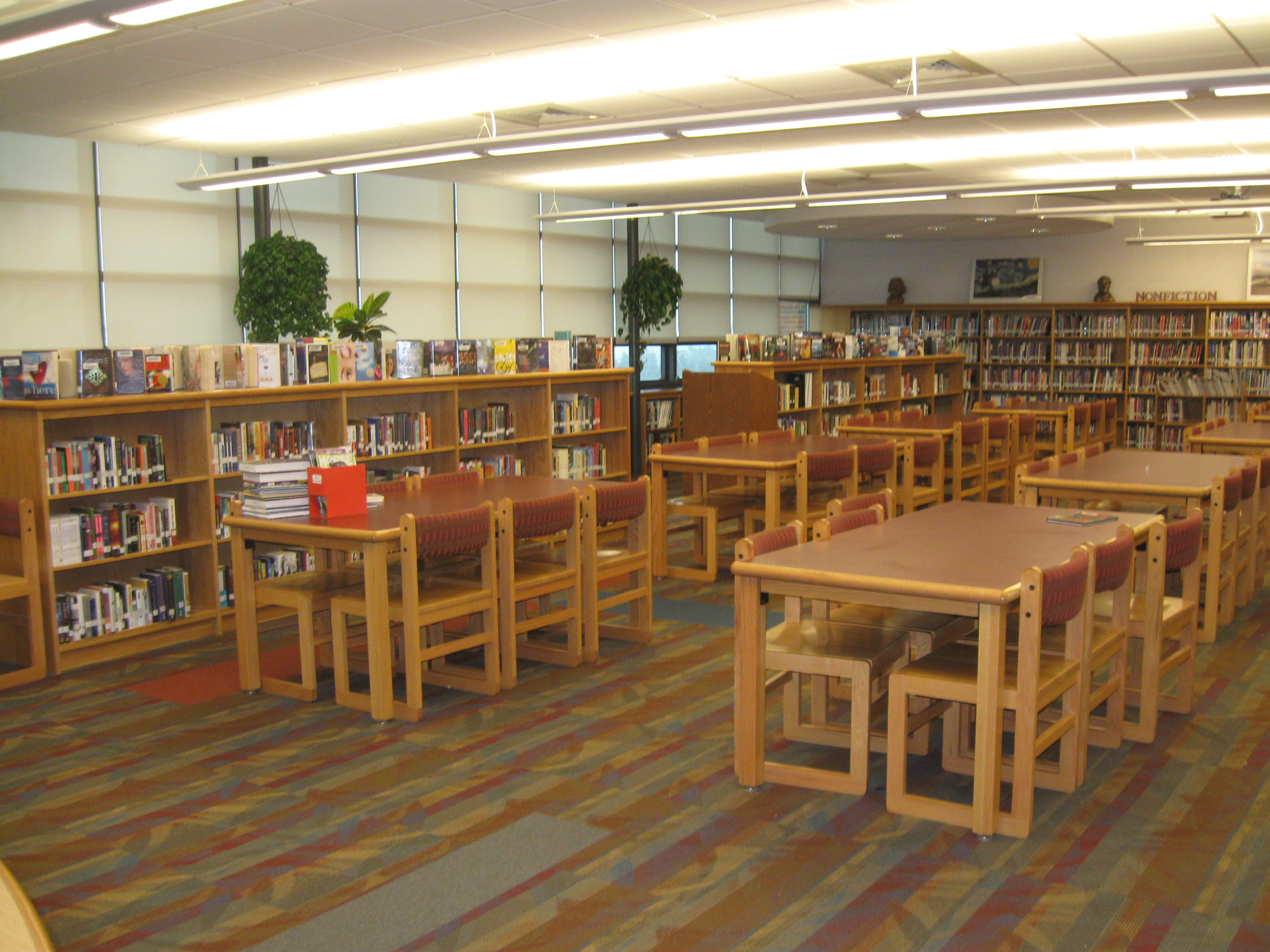

Location
- 100 Trojan Circle; Dry Fork, Virginia; United States; 36°40′11″N 79°31′30″W

Information
- Type: Public
- Established: 1964
- School district: Pittsylvania County Public Schools
- Grades: 9 to 12
- Enrollment: 850
- Student to teacher ratio: 15:1
- Colors: Red and White
- Slogan: "Change the world"
- Athletics conference: AA Piedmont District
- Mascot: Trojan
- Nickname: Tunstall Trojans
- Team name: Tunstall Trojans
- Website: https://ths.pcs.k12.va.us/

Tunstall High School is a high school located in Pittsylvania County, Virginia. Tunstall High School was named for a long time legislator and lawyer, Whitmell P. Tunstall. It was formed in 1964 by the merging of Brosville High and Whitmell High. The official school colors are red and white. Tunstall Middle School students go to this school after eighth grade.

== History ==
Tunstall High School was one of four white high schools in Pittsylvania County to accept black students during the Freedom of Choice era. Over 100 black students integrated at the school during this time. In 2024, a plaque was unveiled at the school to honour these students.

In 2016, Tunstall was named a National Blue Ribbon school by the U.S. Department of Education. Tunstall was the only high school in the state of Virginia to win the award.

As of 2025, there are 850 students at the school. 86% of students receive free school meals.

== Notable alumni ==
- Joe Mantiply — pitcher, Arizona Diamondbacks
