= Rustburg, Virginia =

- Census-designated place
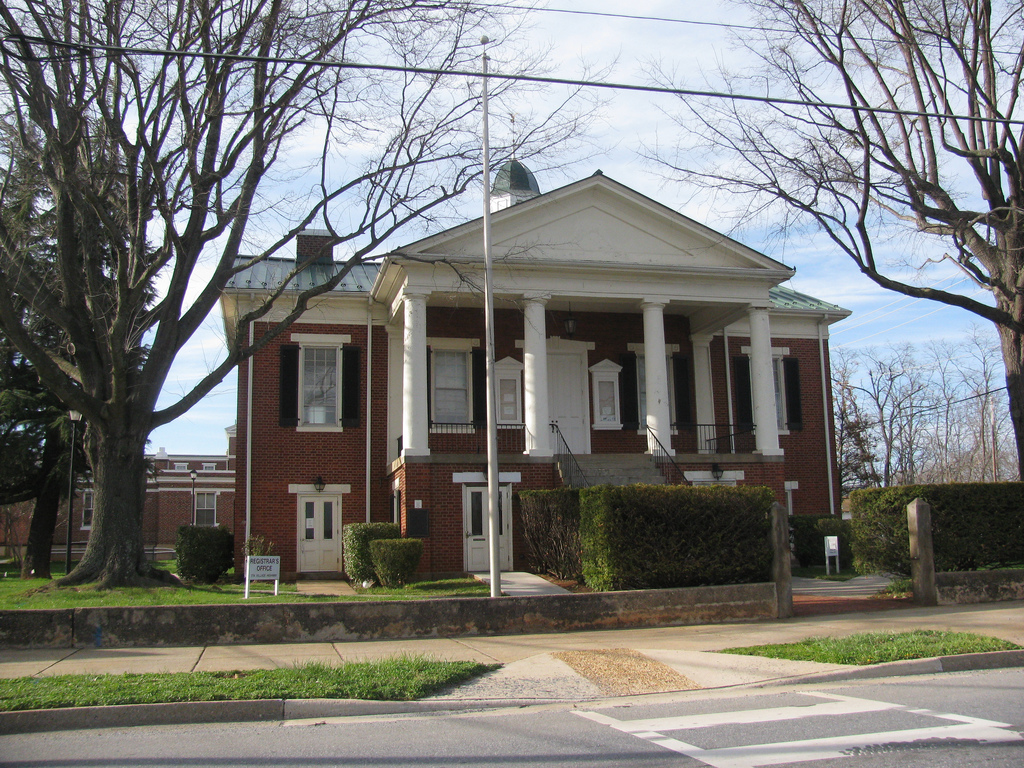
- Former county courthouse, now a museum

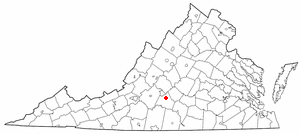
- Location of Rustburg, Virginia
- Coordinates: 37°16′25″N 79°5′56″W
- Country: United States
- State: Virginia
- County: Campbell

Area
  - Total: 12.6 sq mi (32.7 km^{2})
  - Land: 12.5 sq mi (32.4 km^{2})
  - Water: 0.12 sq mi (0.3 km^{2})
- Elevation: 890 ft (270 m)

Population (2010)
  - Total: 1,431
  - Density: 114/sq mi (44.2/km^{2})
- Time zone: UTC−5 (Eastern (EST))
  - Summer (DST): UTC−4 (EDT)
- ZIP code: 24588
- Area code: 434
- FIPS code: 51-69536
- GNIS feature ID: 1500006

Rustburg is a census-designated place (CDP) in and the county seat of Campbell County, Virginia, United States. The population was 1,585 at the 2020 census. It is part of the Lynchburg metropolitan area.

The public high school in Rustburg is Rustburg High School. The public primary and elementary schools are Rustburg Middle School, Rustburg Elementary School, Yellow Branch Elementary School, Fray Educational Center, and Campbell County Technical Center.

== History ==
Rustburg was named for Jeremiah Rust, who donated 50 acres (200,000 m^{2}) of his land for the village in 1784.

The Campbell County Courthouse was listed on the National Register of Historic Places in 1981.

== Geography ==
Rustburg is located in north-central Campbell County at 37°16′25″N 79°05′56″W (37.273731, −79.098914). U.S. Route 501 passes through the center of town, leading north 11 miles (18 km) to Lynchburg and south 20 miles (32 km) to Brookneal. Virginia Route 24 also leads through the center of town, running northeast 9 miles (14 km) to Concord and west 5 miles (8 km) to U.S. Route 29 at Yellow Branch. Long Mountain, topped with communication towers, rises to a summit elevation of 1,440 feet (440 m) northeast of the center of town.

According to the United States Census Bureau, the CDP has a total area of 12.6 square miles (32.7 km^{2}), of which 12.5 square miles (32.4 km^{2}) is land and 0.1 square miles (0.3 km^{2}), or 0.86%, is water.

== Demographics ==
Historical population
Census	Pop.	Note	%±
2000	1,271		—
2020	1,281		—
U.S. Decennial Census; 2000 2010 2020

Rustburg was first listed as a census designated place in the 2000 U.S. census.

As of the census of 2000, there were 1,271 people, 474 households, and 321 families residing in the CDP. The population density was 117.3 people per square mile (45.3/km^{2}). There were 518 housing units at an average density of 47.8/sq mi (18.5/km^{2}). The racial makeup of the CDP was 74.82% White, 23.60% African American, 0.08% Native American, 0.08% Asian, 0.08% from other races, and 1.34% from two or more races. Hispanic or Latino of any race were 0.16% of the population.

There were 474 households, out of which 29.7% had children under the age of 18 living with them, 51.9% were married couples living together, 11.6% had a female householder with no husband present, and 32.1% were non-families. 28.7% of all households were made up of individuals, and 9.7% had someone living alone who was 65 years of age or older. The average household size was 2.41 and the average family size was 3.00.

In the CDP, the population was spread out, with 21.8% under the age of 18, 8.1% from 18 to 24, 32.2% from 25 to 44, 24.0% from 45 to 64, and 13.9% who were 65 years of age or older. The median age was 37 years. For every 100 females there were 110.1 males. For every 100 females age 18 and over, there were 113.3 males.

The median income for a household in the CDP was $31,797, and the median income for a family was $31,758. Males had a median income of $29,615 versus $20,536 for females. The per capita income for the CDP was $14,972. About 10.8% of families and 13.5% of the population were below the poverty line, including 23.1% of those under age 18 and 18.3% of those age 65 or over.
