= Campbell County Public Schools (Virginia) =

School district in Virginia, US

Location
- P.O. Box 99; Rustburg, Virginia 24588 United States

District information
- Superintendent: Clay Stanley

Other information
- Website: http://www.campbell.k12.va.us/

Campbell County Public Schools is a school district which serves Campbell County, Virginia, United States. It is based in Rustburg, Virginia. The superintendent is Dr. Clay Stanley.

== Schools ==
- Altavista Elementary School
- Altavista Combined School
- Brookneal Elementary School
- Brookville Middle School
- Brookville High School
- Concord Elementary School
- Cornerstone Learning Center
- Leesville Road Elementary School
- Rustburg Elementary School
- Rustburg Middle School
- Rustburg High School
- Tomahawk Elementary School
- Campbell County Technical Center
- William Campbell Combined School
- Yellow Branch Elementary School
