= Campbell County, Virginia =

County in Virginia, United States

- County
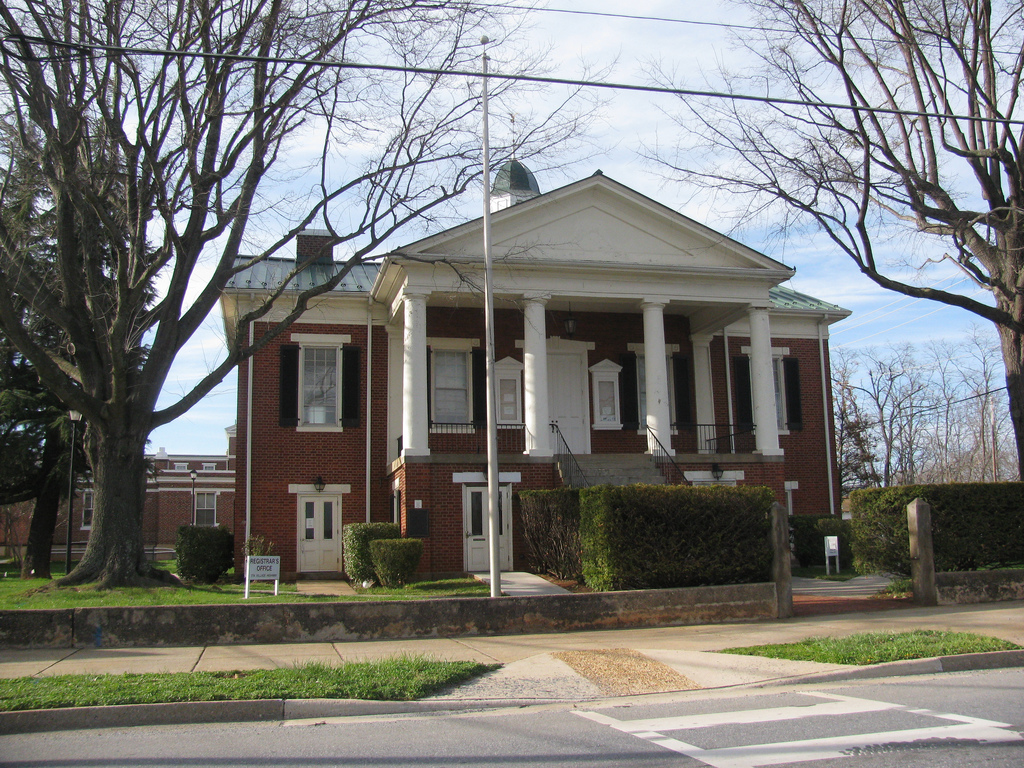
- Campbell County Courthouse in Rustburg

- Flag Seal Logo

- Location within the U.S. state of Virginia
- Coordinates: 37°13′N 79°05′W
- Country: United States
- State: Virginia
- Founded: 1782
- Named for: General William Campbell
- Seat: Rustburg
- Largest town: Altavista

Area
  - Total: 507 sq mi (1,310 km^{2})
  - Land: 504 sq mi (1,310 km^{2})
  - Water: 3.5 sq mi (9.1 km^{2}) 0.7%

Population (2020)
  - Total: 55,696
  - Estimate (2025): 55,629 ▼
  - Density: 110/sq mi (42/km^{2})
- Time zone: UTC−5 (Eastern)
  - Summer (DST): UTC−4 (EDT)
- Congressional district: 5th
- Website: www.co.campbell.va.us

Campbell County is a United States county situated in the south central part of the Commonwealth of Virginia. Located in the Piedmont region of Virginia, Campbell borders the Blue Ridge Mountains. At the 2020 census, the county population was 55,696. The number of residents has grown steadily in every census after 1930, and the total population has more than doubled since that time. The county seat is Rustburg.

Grounded on a tobacco cash crop economy, Campbell County was created in 1782 from part of Bedford County. The county was named in honor of General William Campbell, hero of the American Revolutionary War.

Campbell County is part of the Lynchburg metropolitan area. Lynchburg was initially established in Campbell County in 1786, incorporated as a town in 1805, and separated from Campbell County when Lynchburg became an independent city in 1852. Lynchburg has annexed additional land from Bedford County and Campbell County through the years, most recently in 1976.

== History ==
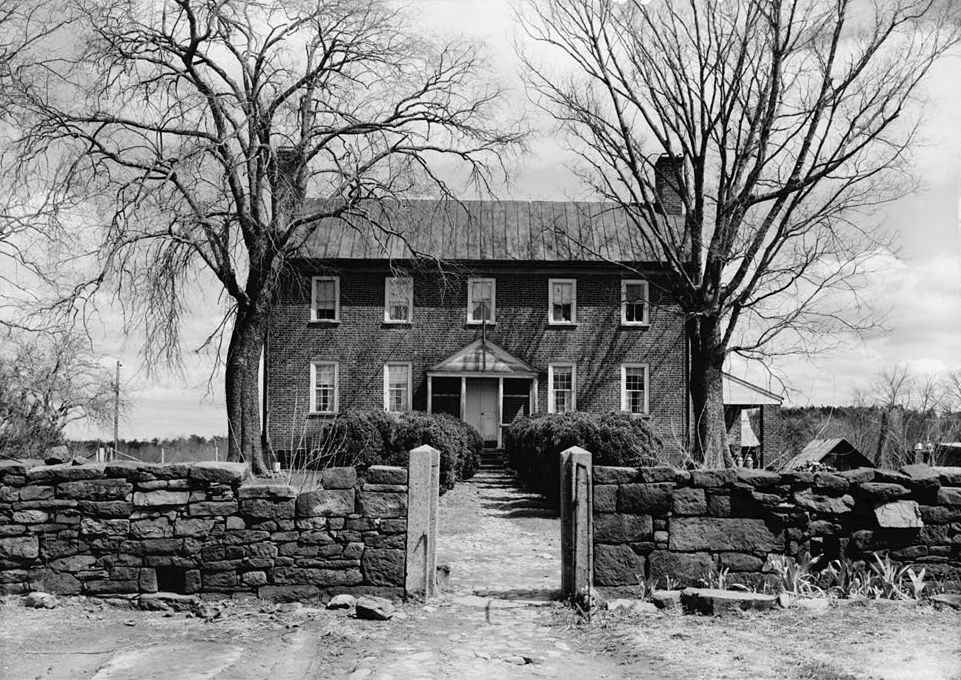
Main house, Green Hill Plantation, Campbell County, Historic American Buildings Survey.

The Native American tribes of the Monacan, Iroquois, and Cherokee were the original inhabitants of the Campbell County area, but were later forced west due to the settlers' progress. Sir William Gooch, in 1727, created a couple of "inducements" in order to lure settlers to the Campbell County area. These inducements were that if one settled on the Staunton River "in the bounds of the newly formed County of Brunswick" then they would be freed from paying levies for ten years. The second "inducement" was that the settler could claim 400 acres simply by building a cabin on the land and by "planting a patch of grain".

Throughout the 18th century, multiple Scotch-Irish families would begin settling in the area, these names included the Irvins, the Mitchells, the McCues, the McElroys, McDowells, Campbells, and others. These families arrived on a ship known as the George and Ann, sailed by Captain Rymer, who, instead of going towards Philadelphia from Derry, planned to keep sailing around the coast until the passengers starved to death, so he could loot their valuables. However, a captain named Captain Lothrop spotted the ship in distress nearby Monomoy. Afterwards, the passengers were landed at Orleans, and these future settlers of Campbell County would travel south to investigate Sir William Gooch's inducements.

These inducements successfully attracted only a few new settlers, and the Governor soon took mention of his inducements to the ocean ports in which immigrants were arriving in America, as well as to the ports back in their homelands. This great difficulty in gaining new settlers for Campbell County is one of the reasons that the Governor allowed the Scotch-Irish immigrants with Presbyterian beliefs to gain religious freedom, in order to secure as many new settlers as possible for the newly founded county.

The area that would become Campbell County was first settled by Europeans, initially Scotch-Irish Presbyterians, in the late 1730s. After nearly fifty years of immigration and development, the newly formed county was established in 1782 from part of Bedford County, and was the first county formed after the American Revolution. Campbell County was named for Revolutionary War hero, General William Campbell, who is known for the 1780 Battle of Kings Mountain. The independent city of Lynchburg, Virginia was subsequently formed from the county's land in 1786.

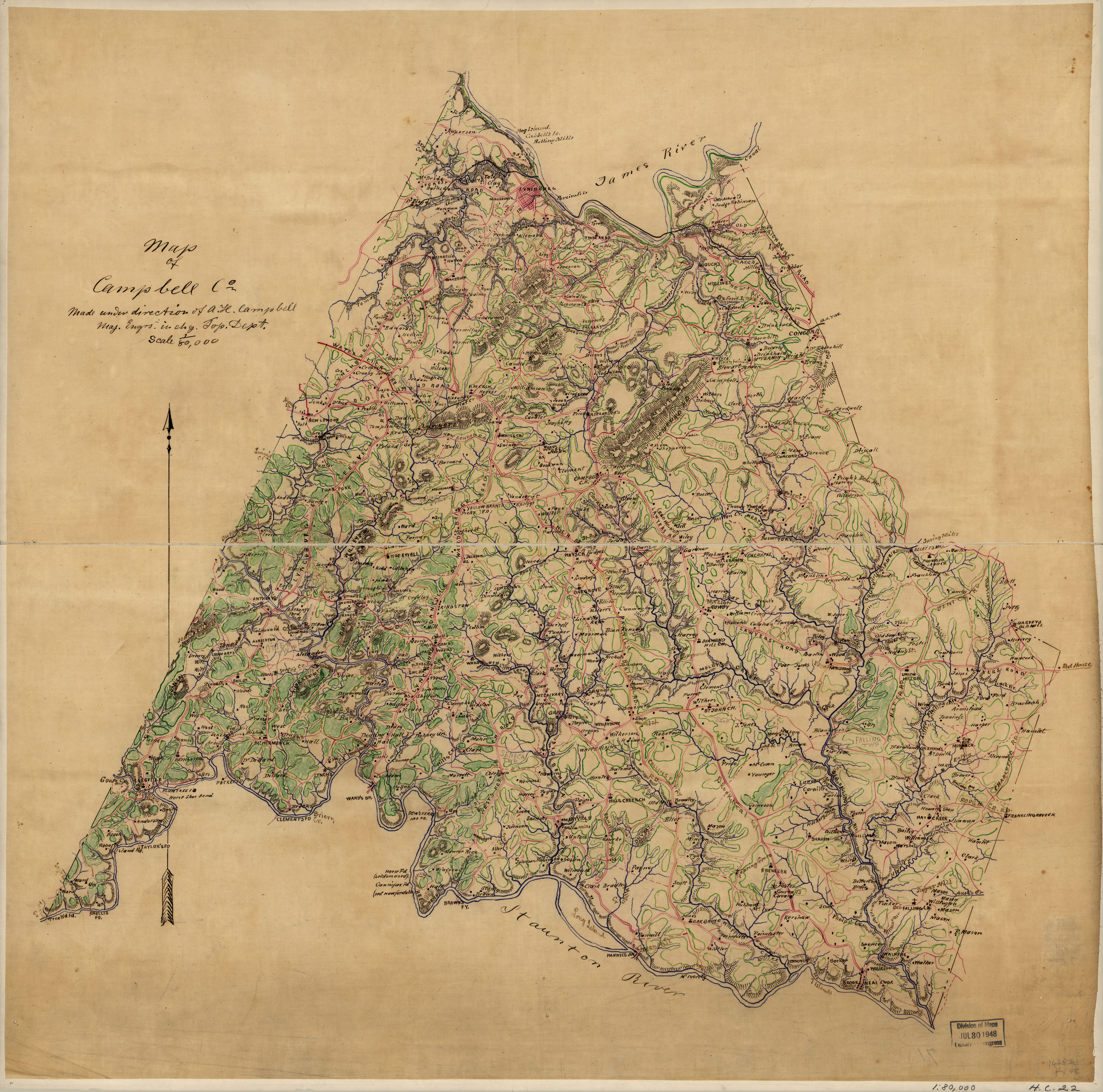
Map of Campbell County, Virginia.

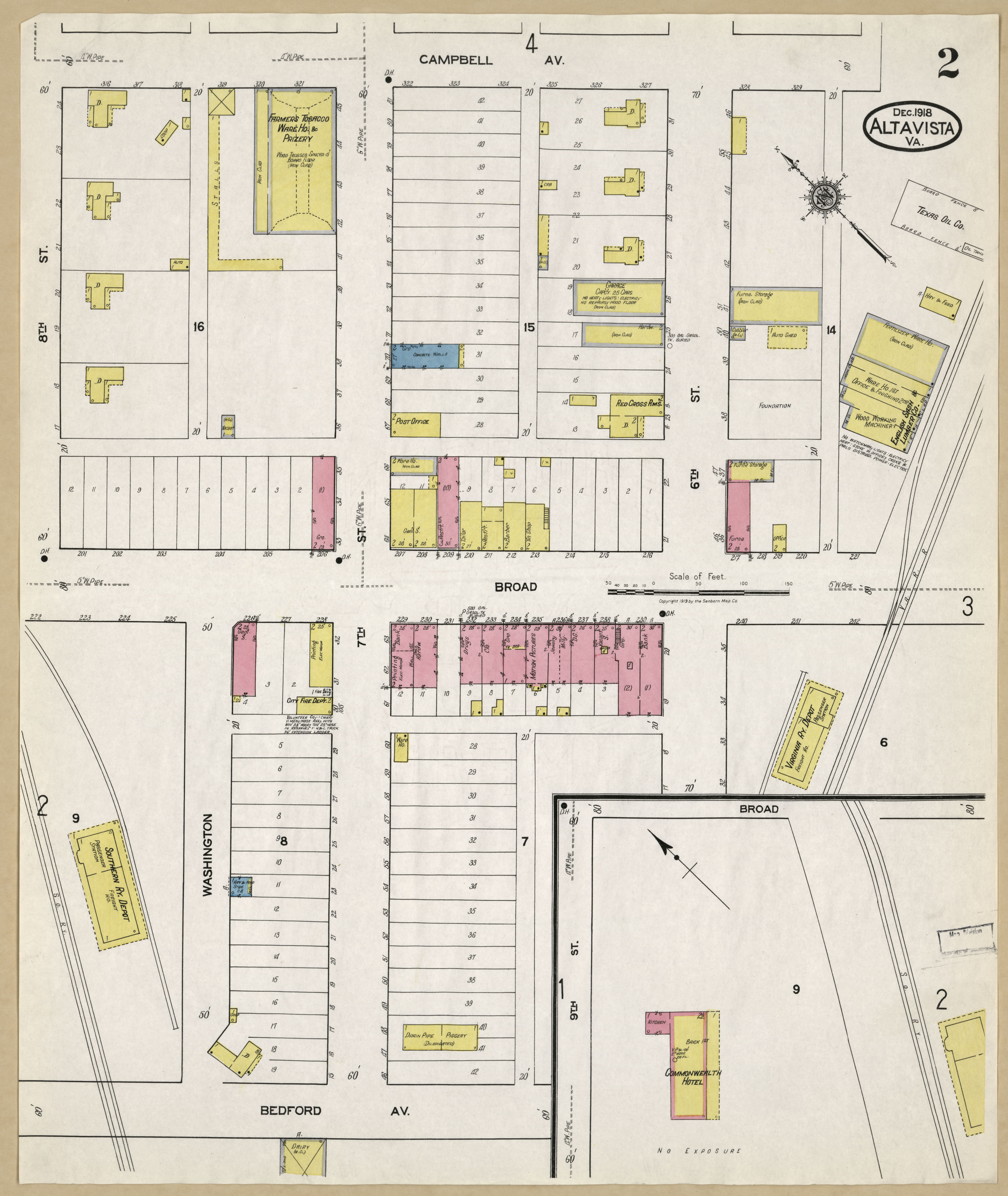
Sanborn Fire Insurance Map from Altavista, Campbell County, Virginia.

Jeremiah Rust donated the land that would become the county's seat named Rustburg. The towns of Altavista and Brookneal were created due to their business advantages as well as the "intersection of trails". Altavista was planned by a group of businessmen in 1907, due to its "strategic" location and "potential" as a new location for a railroad.

From its earliest days, the county relied on tobacco as the primary cash crop and basis for the economy, though it also developed early manufacturing operations. Brookneal, with its strategic location on the Staunton River, was long an important tobacco and textile hub. However, the departure of manufacturing and the changing tobacco market has forced Campbell to transform from a mainly agricultural area into a mixture of suburban and rural communities. Campbell County was also an iron manufacturer and begun operations Pre-Revolutionary War and continued operations in Oxford Iron Works until it was closed in 1875. The building is still standing today.

Campbell County opened its first public school in 1871 after the Civil War. In 1878, Campbell County and Lynchburg became two separate entities when Lynchburg was recognized as an independent city. The first school fair was held in Rustburg, the county seat, in 1908. This was the first school fair ever held in Virginia and was started by the Virginia Federation of Women's Club, "with the aid of J.S. Thomas, then school examiner in the district, and with the agreement of the Van Dyke League to help in Campbell." This fair was a showcase of "expert knowledge and training," as well as each child's best work.

Campbell County and its residents have participated and given aid in many wars. They have had soldiers involved in the American Revolution, Civil War, World War I, World War II, the Korean War, Vietnam War, Gulf War, and the War in Afghanistan, Iraq War.

=== Religion ===
Campbell County's religious origin predominantly included Protestant Christianity, with denominations such as Quakerism and Presbyterianism strongly represented. Early religious adherents sought religious freedom. They migrated from many places, but most migrated from Colonial Williamsburg and surrounding areas where the Episcopal Church hampered the practice of other religions.

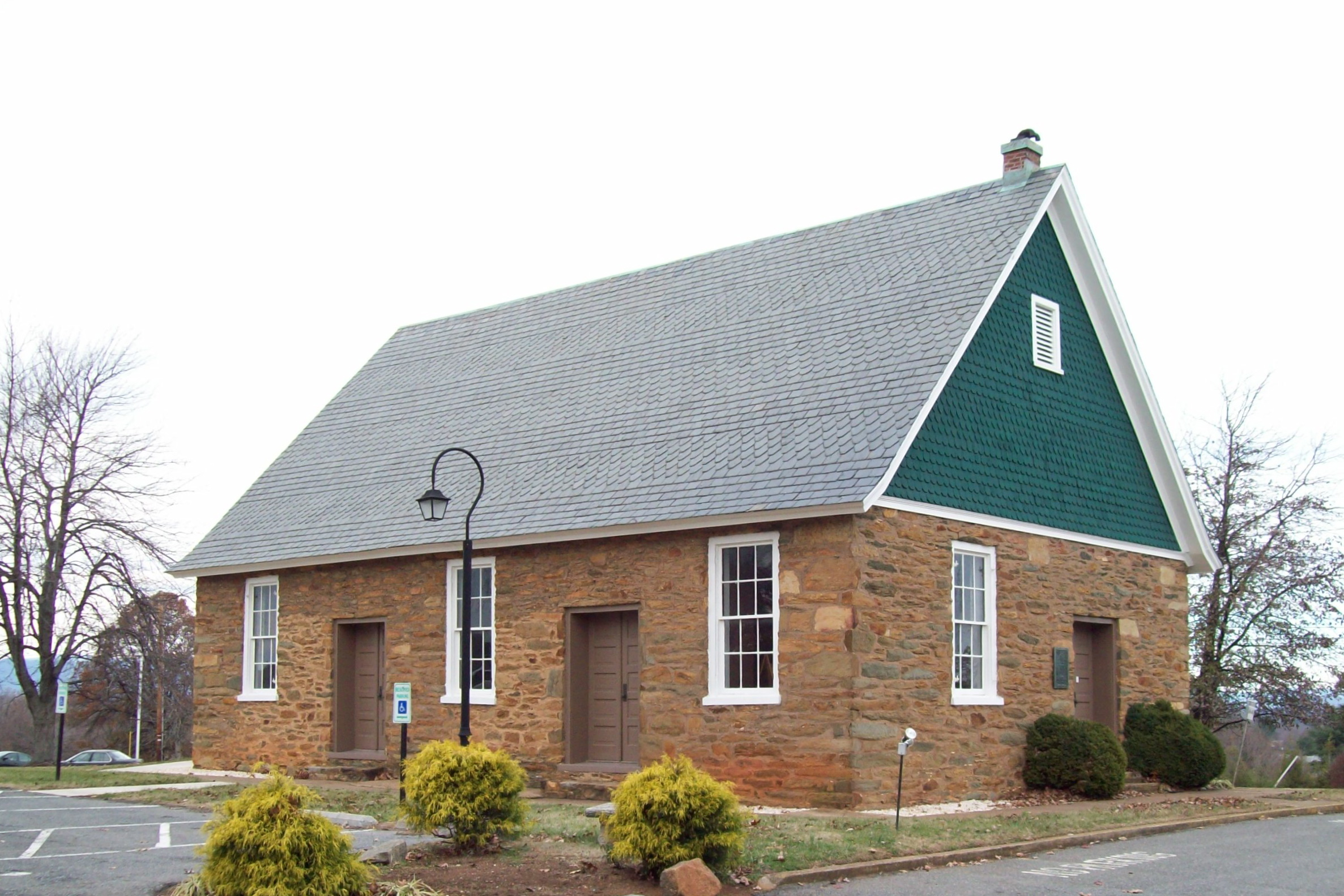
South River Friends Quaker Meeting House.

The Quakers gained a foothold within the Campbell County area due to Sarah Clark Lynch, wife of Charles Lynch, the founder of the ferry boat service across the James River and mother of John Lynch, the founder of Lynchburg. Due to Sarah Lynch's influence their application for a meeting house was approved, and the South River Friends Meeting House was built. The Quakers later migrated from the area due to disagreements with the other Campbell County populace over issues such as slavery and the American Revolution. The Quakers maintained pacifist beliefs and during the American Revolution they espoused a standpoint of neutrality and stated that warfare went against their belief system. This apparent refusal to aid their neighbors in their fight for independence greatly angered many and created a wedge between the Quakers and the Non-Quakers. The Quakers also adamantly believed in the abolition of slavery and preached how the institution was wrong and should be disallowed. In 1817 they freed all of their slaves. These actions created additional tension with their slave-holding neighbors and caused many Quakers to leave the Campbell County area and to move West.

The Presbyterian religious faction mainly consisted of Scotch-Irish who originally came to America in order to gain religious freedom from the "Established Church in Ireland" and to create a better life for themselves. They originally settled in Pennsylvania, but then moved to Virginia due to Governor Gooch's inducements to entice settlers to come to Campbell County. The Presbyterians and their descendants then remained in Campbell County, and others who had been with them on the trip to America soon followed after, greatly aiding in the settlement process.

== Geography ==
According to the U.S. Census Bureau, the county has a total area of 507 square miles (1,313.1 km^{2}), of which 504 square miles (1,305.4 km^{2}) is land and 3 square miles (7.8 km^{2}) (0.55%) is water.

=== Adjacent counties / Independent city ===
- Lynchburg – northwest (independent city)
- Amherst County – north
- Appomattox County – northeast
- Charlotte County – east
- Halifax County – southeast
- Pittsylvania County – southwest
- Bedford County – west

=== Major highways ===
- US 29
- US 460
- US 501
- SR 24
- SR 40
- SR 43

== Demographics ==
Historical population
Census	Pop.	Note	%±
1790	7,685		—
1800	9,866		28.4%
1810	11,001		11.5%
1820	16,569		50.6%
1830	20,350		22.8%
1840	21,030		3.3%
1850	23,245		10.5%
1860	26,197		12.7%
1870	28,384		8.3%
1880	36,250		27.7%
1890	41,087		13.3%
1900	23,256		−43.4%
1910	23,043		−0.9%
1920	26,716		15.9%
1930	22,885		−14.3%
1940	26,048		13.8%
1950	28,877		10.9%
1960	32,958		14.1%
1970	43,319		31.4%
1980	45,424		4.9%
1990	47,572		4.7%
2000	51,078		7.4%
2010	54,842		7.4%
2020	55,696		1.6%
2025 (est.)	55,629	▼	−0.1%
U.S. Decennial Census; 1790–1960 1900–1990; 1990–2000 2010 2020

=== Racial and ethnic composition ===
Campbell County, Virginia – Racial and ethnic composition Note: the US Census treats Hispanic/Latino as an ethnic category. This table excludes Latinos from the racial categories and assigns them to a separate category. Hispanics/Latinos may be of any race.
Race / Ethnicity (NH = Non-Hispanic)	Pop 1980	Pop 1990	Pop 2000	Pop 2010	Pop 2020	% 1980	% 1990	% 2000	% 2010	% 2020
White alone (NH)	38,155	40,290	42,298	44,595	42,884	84.00%	84.69%	82.81%	81.32%	77.00%
Black or African American alone (NH)	6,780	6,857	7,465	7,737	7,761	14.93%	14.41%	14.61%	14.11%	13.93%
Native American or Alaska Native alone (NH)	29	40	97	142	169	0.06%	0.08%	0.19%	0.26%	0.30%
Asian alone (NH)	167	162	313	543	601	0.37%	0.34%	0.61%	0.99%	1.08%
Native Hawaiian or Pacific Islander alone (NH)	x	x	2	11	8	x	x	0.00%	0.02%	0.01%
Other race alone (NH)	39	7	41	56	241	0.09%	0.01%	0.08%	0.10%	0.43%
Mixed race or Multiracial (NH)	x	x	439	840	2,217	x	x	0.86%	1.53%	3.98%
Hispanic or Latino (any race)	254	216	423	918	1,815	0.56%	0.45%	0.83%	1.67%	3.26%
Total	45,424	47,572	51,078	54,842	55,696	100.00%	100.00%	100.00%	100.00%	100.00%

=== 2020 census ===
As of the 2020 census, the county had a population of 55,696. The median age was 42.7 years. 20.7% of residents were under the age of 18 and 20.8% of residents were 65 years of age or older. For every 100 females there were 94.5 males, and for every 100 females age 18 and over there were 92.0 males age 18 and over.

The racial makeup of the county was 77.8% White, 14.1% Black or African American, 0.3% American Indian and Alaska Native, 1.1% Asian, 0.0% Native Hawaiian and Pacific Islander, 1.7% from some other race, and 5.0% from two or more races. Hispanic or Latino residents of any race comprised 3.3% of the population.

43.1% of residents lived in urban areas, while 56.9% lived in rural areas.

There were 22,955 households in the county, of which 27.0% had children under the age of 18 living with them and 28.0% had a female householder with no spouse or partner present. About 28.7% of all households were made up of individuals and 13.2% had someone living alone who was 65 years of age or older.

There were 25,060 housing units, of which 8.4% were vacant. Among occupied housing units, 72.2% were owner-occupied and 27.8% were renter-occupied. The homeowner vacancy rate was 1.5% and the rental vacancy rate was 5.6%.

=== 2000 Census ===
As of the census of 2000, there were 51,078 people, 20,639 households, and 14,694 families residing in the county. The population density was 101 people per square mile (39 people/km^{2}). There were 22,088 housing units at an average density of 44 units per square mile (17 units/km^{2}). The racial makeup of the county was 83.24% White, 14.71% Black or African American, 0.19% Native American, 0.62% Asian, 0.01% Pacific Islander, 0.33% from other races, and 0.90% from two or more races. 0.83% of the population were Hispanic or Latino of any race.

There were 20,639 households, out of which 30.80% had children under the age of 18 living with them, 56.00% were married couples living together, 11.40% had a female householder with no husband present, and 28.80% were non-families. 24.60% of all households were made up of individuals, and 8.80% had someone living alone who was 65 years of age or older. The average household size was 2.45 and the average family size was 2.91.

In the county, the age distribution of the population showed 24.00% under the age of 18, 7.70% from 18 to 24, 29.30% from 25 to 44, 25.60% from 45 to 64, and 13.50% who were 65 years of age or older. The median age was 38 years. For every 100 females there were 95.30 males. For every 100 females age 18 and over, there were 92.30 males.

The median income for a household in the county was $37,280, and the median income for a family was $42,901. Males had a median income of $32,108 versus $22,286 for females. The per capita income for the county was $18,134. About 7.90% of families and 10.60% of the population were below the poverty line, including 14.10% of those under age 18 and 10.90% of those age 65 or over.

== Government ==
=== Board of Supervisors ===
- Altavista district: Mr. Tom Lawton
- Brookneal district: Mr. Charlie Watts, II
- Concord district: Mr. Matt Cline
- Rustburg district: Mr. Jon Hardie
- Spring Hill district: Mr. Kenny Brown
- Sunburst district: Mr. Paul Dowdy
- Timberlake district: Mr. Justin Carwile

=== Constitutional officers ===
- Clerk of the Circuit Court: Valerie Younger (I)
- Commissioner of the Revenue: Michele Roakes (R)
- Commonwealth's Attorney: Paul McAndrews (I)
- Sheriff: Winston W. Clark, III (I)
- Treasurer: Amanda R. Witkowski (R)

Campbell County is represented by Mark J. Peake in the Virginia Senate, Wendell Walker and Eric Zehr in the Virginia House of Delegates, and John McGuire in the U.S. House of Representatives.

United States presidential election results for Campbell County, Virginia
Year	Republican		Democratic		Third party(ies)	
Year	No.	%	No.	%	No.	%
1912	97	9.22%	810	77.00%	145	13.78%
1916	185	14.62%	1,007	79.60%	73	5.77%
1920	375	21.58%	1,341	77.16%	22	1.27%
1924	372	18.76%	1,468	74.03%	143	7.21%
1928	801	45.31%	967	54.69%	0	0.00%
1932	301	14.89%	1,692	83.72%	28	1.39%
1936	370	15.66%	1,987	84.09%	6	0.25%
1940	456	16.18%	2,358	83.65%	5	0.18%
1944	634	24.08%	1,995	75.77%	4	0.15%
1948	668	23.23%	1,554	54.03%	654	22.74%
1952	2,447	47.26%	2,713	52.39%	18	0.35%
1956	2,827	47.79%	2,674	45.20%	415	7.01%
1960	2,903	48.63%	3,030	50.75%	37	0.62%
1964	5,713	62.47%	3,401	37.19%	31	0.34%
1968	5,731	44.73%	1,996	15.58%	5,084	39.68%
1972	11,676	82.48%	2,055	14.52%	426	3.01%
1976	7,442	60.78%	4,354	35.56%	449	3.67%
1980	9,592	65.16%	4,473	30.39%	656	4.46%
1984	13,388	74.69%	4,380	24.44%	156	0.87%
1988	12,713	72.51%	4,574	26.09%	246	1.40%
1992	10,931	55.33%	5,999	30.36%	2,827	14.31%
1996	10,273	54.35%	6,788	35.91%	1,841	9.74%
2000	13,162	64.75%	6,659	32.76%	506	2.49%
2004	15,891	69.10%	6,862	29.84%	244	1.06%
2008	17,444	67.58%	8,091	31.34%	279	1.08%
2012	17,695	68.86%	7,595	29.56%	406	1.58%
2016	19,551	71.00%	6,664	24.20%	1,320	4.79%
2020	21,245	71.07%	8,070	27.00%	577	1.93%
2024	23,032	73.62%	7,890	25.22%	365	1.17%

== Communities ==
=== Towns ===
- Altavista
- Brookneal

=== Census-designated places ===
- Concord
- Rustburg
- Timberlake

=== Other unincorporated communities ===
- Castle Craig
- Evington
- Gladys
- Kingston
- Long Island
- Lynch Station
- New London

Some of these unincorporated areas have Lynchburg mailing addresses.

== Sports and recreation ==
Campbell County is home to sporting events and organizations including:

- Altavista High School sports
- Altavista YMCA
- Brookville Bees Youth Athletic Association - Nonprofit organization providing recreational football and basketball for area youth.
- Brookville High School sports
- Brookville Soccer Club - Nonprofit organization providing recreational Soccer for area youth.
- Campbell County Parks & Recreation
- Hiking areas include Timbrook Park.
- Rustburg High School sports
- Timber Lake - Fishing, paddle boating, swimming
- Timberlake Dixie Youth
- William Campbell Combined School sports

== See also ==
- National Register of Historic Places listings in Campbell County, Virginia
- Campbell County Public Schools (Virginia)
