= Appomattox County High School =

Location
- 198 Evergreen Avenue; Appomattox, Virginia 24522; United States; 37.3466°N 78.828°W

Information
- Type: Public
- Established: 1973
- Locale: Rural, Distant
- School district: Appomattox County Public Schools
- NCES District ID: 5100240
- Superintendent: Dr. Jason S Tibbs
- NCES School ID: 510024000076
- Principal: Kevin Walker
- Faculty: 52.75 (on an FTE basis)
- Grades: 9–12
- Enrollment: 731 (2024–25)
- Student to teacher ratio: 13.86
- Colors: Blue, Gray, and White
- Athletics conference: Class 2
- Mascot: Raiders
- Nickname: Appo
- Yearbook: The Traveler
- Website: www.acpsweb.net/o/achs

Appomattox County High School is a public high school located in Appomattox, Virginia, United States. Its teams are known as the Raiders and its colors are blue, grey, and white. The school was built in 1973.

== Logo dispute with University of Arizona ==
In 2013, The University of Arizona contacted then principal, Martha Eagle, with a cease and desist order for use of the iconic, block 'A' logo. The school district had been using the block 'A' similar to University of Arizona's ever since the mid 1980s. The school board held a public contest for the design of the new logo. An eight grader won the contest and that design is now used as the official administrative and athletic 'A'.

== Notable alumni ==
- Sylvia Trent-Adams, retired U.S. Public Health Service Commissioned Corps rear admiral, who last served as the principal deputy assistant secretary for health
