= Brookville High School (Virginia) =

Coordinates: 37°20′44.5″N 79°14′7.5″W

- 100 Laxton Road; Lynchburg, Virginia 24502; United States

Information
- Type: Public
- Established: 1969 (at current location)
- School district: Campbell County Public Schools
- Principal: Christina White
- Faculty: 68.75 (FTE)
- Grades: 9 to 12
- Enrollment: 971 (2022-23)
- Student to teacher ratio: 14.12
- Colors: Maroon & Gold
- Athletics conference: Virginia High School League; AA Region III; AA Seminole District
- Mascot: Bees
- Yearbook: The Buzzer
- Website: https://bhs.ccpsva.org/

Brookville High School is a high school in Campbell County, Virginia, United States.

The school was founded in 1926 with the first elementary classes beginning in November. The first high school classes began in 1927 with 2 teachers, and the first graduating class was 1930, with three graduates. The last graduating high school class from the original school was in 1966. The old building was eventually torn down in March, 1978 due to annexation. The current building was completed in 1969 and is now located on Laxton Road, on what is now the boundary between Campbell County and the city of Lynchburg. The Brookville attendance area is served by four schools: Tomahawk Elementary, Leesville Road Elementary, Brookville Middle, and Brookville High. Brookville High School has been accredited with the Southern Association of Colleges and Schools since 1973.

== Athletics ==
As of November 2015, Brookville High School holds the following state division championship titles:

=== Baseball ===
- 1973 AA Champions - holder of the State record of 21 innings played in Regional victory over Laurel Park High School in 1973.
- 1987 AA Champions

=== Football ===
- 1999 AA Division 3 Champions
- 2011 AA Division 3 Champions
- 2012 AA Division 3 Champions

=== Boys golf ===
- 1993 AA Champions
- 2008 AA Champions

=== Boys indoor track ===
- 1980 AA Champions
- 2007 AA Champions

=== Wrestling ===
- 1976 AA Champions

=== Girls softball ===
- 2014 AA Champions
- 2015 AA Champions

=== Marching Band ===
- 2016 Group 1 State Champions

== Notable alumni ==
- Mike Barr, former Rutgers University Punter, Former Punter for the Arizona Cardinals
- Anthony Clark, actor from Yes, Dear, Comedian
- Jerry Falwell, founder of Thomas Road Baptist Church and Liberty University
- Deshon Foxx, former NFL wide receiver for the New York Jets and Seattle Seahawks
- Brandon Inge, former MLB player Oakland Athletics, Detroit Tigers
- Gina St. John, radio and television personality
- Phil Leftwich, former MLB player California Angels)
- Carolyn Martin, president, Amherst College
- Logan Thomas, former Virginia Tech Quarterback, currently playing tight end for the Washington Commanders
- Phil Vassar, country music star
