= Altavista High School =

American public high school

Coordinates: 37.1097°N 79.2955°W

Altavista Combined School
- 904 Bedford Avenue; Altavista, Virginia 24517; United States

Information
- Type: Public
- Established: c. 1910
- School district: Campbell County Public Schools
- Principal: Stefanie Anderson
- Faculty: 49.96 (FTE)
- Grades: 6 to 12
- Enrollment: 606 (2025-26)
- Student to teacher ratio: 13.27
- Colors: Orange & Black
- Slogan: Number One, Colonel Country
- Athletics conference: Virginia High School League; Division A A Dogwood District
- Sports: Football, Volleyball, Cross Country, Marching Band, Basketball, Tennis, Soccer, Track, Baseball, Softball, Forensics, Swim, A.C.E
- Mascot: Colonels
- Team name: Colonels, Lady Colonels
- Yearbook: The Nuntius
- Website: acs.campbell.k12.va.us

Altavista Combined School is a public school in Altavista, Virginia. The school houses both the middle school and high school in the same building, and the enrollment ranges between 600 and 700 students in grades 6–12. Their mascot is named "The Colonel", and their sports teams are named "The Colonels". The school is a member of VHSL and competes with the Group A Dogwood District.

== History ==
In 1910, the first schoolhouse in Altavista was built, and it contained 4 rooms and was built of wood. Prior to then, the children of Altavista were schooled in a shantyhouse, with Pearl Yeaman as principal. In 1913, 4 new rooms were added on top of the building. After a fire destroyed the original building in 1917, further iterations of the building were constructed out of bricks and concrete. The first school yearbook, The Original, was published in 1917. In the following year, the school had an enrollment of 297 students (both elementary and high school) with J. S. Pruitt serving as principal. In 1920, the school became accredited.

The first recorded use of orange and black as the school's colors was in The Nuntius 1925, where the football team was called "The Orange and Black". In The Nuntius 1929, the school song cheers on "The Orange and the Black".

In 1979, a separate high school section was built containing an auditorium, a media center, and high school classrooms.

== Demographics ==
As of 2026, Altavista Combined School has a student population of 606 that is 0.3% Native American, 0.5% Asian, 5% Hispanic, 7.6% multiracial, 31.8% black, and 54.8% white. As of the 2025–26 school year, Altavista's graduation rate was 82%.

== Athletics ==
Division A state championship titles:

- Football: 2009, 2013, 2014
- Volleyball: 2002
- Boys Cross Country: 2010
- Boys Basketball: 2004, 2013, 2014, 2015
- Girls Basketball: 2004
- Softball: 2009

== Organizations ==
Altavista offers multiple student clubs, including Art Club, Bible Club, Colonel Crazies, Educators Rising, Model General Assembly, Science Club, Spanish Club, Spanish Honor Society, Student Council Association, amd Unplugged. The school also offers local chapters of national organizations, including Future Business Leaders of America, Future Farmers of America, National Honor Society, and National Junior Honor Society.

=== Nuntius yearbook ===
- VHSL Trophy Class
- Columbia Scholastic Press Association Silver Crown
- Columbia Scholastic Press Association Gold Crown
- National Scholastic Press Association Pacemaker Finalist

== Notable alumni ==
- Juan Thornhill, NFL player
