= National Register of Historic Places listings in Campbell County, Virginia =

Location of Campbell County in Virginia

This is a list of the National Register of Historic Places listings in Campbell County, Virginia.

This is intended to be a complete list of the properties and districts on the National Register of Historic Places in Campbell County, Virginia, United States. The locations of National Register properties and districts for which the latitude and longitude coordinates are included below, may be seen in an online map.

There are 19 properties and districts listed on the National Register in the county. Another property was once listed but has been removed.

This National Park Service list is complete through NPS recent listings posted March 6, 2026.

== Current listings ==
| | Name on the Register | Image | Date listed | Location | City or town | Description |
|---|---|---|---|---|---|---|
| 1 | Altavista Downtown Historic District | Altavista Downtown Historic District | May 28, 2010 (#10000306) | 400 and 500 blocks of 7th St.; 500, 600, and 700 blocks of Broad St.; 500 and 600 blocks of Main St.; and 400 block of Washington St. 37°06′34″N 79°17′27″W | Altavista | |
| 2 | Avoca | Avoca | September 16, 1982 (#82004546) | North of Altavista on U.S. Route 29; 37°07′48″N 79°16′11″W | Altavista | |
| 3 | Blenheim | Blenheim | May 31, 1979 (#79003033) | 2.4 miles (3.9 km) southwest of Spring Mills; also east of Nowlins Mill Rd., 3,500 feet (1,100 m) south of its junction with Red Oak School Rd. 37°13′15″N 78°57′07″W | Spring Mills | Second set of boundaries represents a boundary increase of May 26, 1994 |
| 4 | Brookneal Historic District | Brookneal Historic District | June 8, 2011 (#11000348) | Adams Ferry Rd., Old Main, E. Rush, and Commerce Sts., Lynchburg, Wycliffe, and Cook Aves., and Pick St. 37°02′49″N 78°56′32″W | Brookneal | |
| 5 | Campbell County Courthouse | Campbell County Courthouse | October 29, 1981 (#81000638) | U.S. Route 501; 37°16′37″N 79°06′05″W | Rustburg | |
| 6 | Campbell County Training School | Campbell County Training School | January 14, 2019 (#100003311) | 1470 State Route 24; 37°16′35″N 79°05′23″W | Rustburg | |
| 7 | Caryswood | Caryswood | March 17, 2010 (#10000089) | 8291 State Route 24; 37°14′00″N 79°15′10″W | Evington | |
| 8 | Cat Rock Sluice of the Roanoke Navigation | Cat Rock Sluice of the Roanoke Navigation | March 25, 1980 (#80004177) | West of Brookneal; 37°02′38″N 78°57′39″W | Brookneal | |
| 9 | Dixon Cemetery | | August 12, 2024 (#100010692) | Address Restricted | Concord vicinity | |
| 10 | Federal Hill | Federal Hill | September 9, 1982 (#82004547) | South of Forest on Turkey Foot Rd. 37°18′37″N 79°17′02″W | Forest | |
| 11 | Flat Creek Rural Historic District | | November 13, 2020 (#100005773) | Colonial Hwy. (VA 24), Dearborn Rd., Leesville Rd. 37°13′57″N 79°16′44″W | Evington vicinity | |
| 12 | Green Hill | Green Hill | November 12, 1969 (#69000226) | Southwest of Long Island near the junction of Epsons and Pannills Rds. 37°03′43″N 79°04′20″W | Long Island | |
| 13 | The Grove | | August 24, 2021 (#100006849) | 151 Closeburn Manor Dr. 37°18′39″N 79°16′09″W | Lynchburg vicinity | |
| 14 | Mead's Tavern | Mead's Tavern | November 17, 2021 (#100007133) | 594 Alum Springs Rd. 37°18′06″N 79°16′51″W | Lynchburg vicinity | |
| 15 | Mount Athos | Mount Athos | July 24, 1975 (#75002016) | 2 miles (3.2 km) north of Kelly; 37°24′30″N 79°02′49″W | Kelly | |
| 16 | Norfolk Southern Six Mile Bridge No. 58 | Norfolk Southern Six Mile Bridge No. 58 | October 12, 1995 (#95001175) | Over the James River west of the junction of Mt. Athos Rd. and the Norfolk Southern Railroad tracks 37°23′36″N 79°03′38″W | Lynchburg | |
| 17 | Oak Grove | Oak Grove | May 16, 2002 (#02000516) | 7378 Gladys Rd. 37°07′05″N 79°13′34″W | Altavista | |
| 18 | Shady Grove | Shady Grove | August 26, 1982 (#82004548) | East of Gladys on Mollies Creek Rd. 37°10′24″N 79°02′52″W | Gladys | |
| 19 | Walnut Hill | Walnut Hill | January 27, 2000 (#99001724) | Lawyers Rd. 37°16′19″N 79°13′11″W | Lynchburg | |

== Former listing ==
| | Name on the Register | Image | Date listed | Date removed | Location | City or town | Description |
|---|---|---|---|---|---|---|---|
| 1 | Mansion Truss Bridge | Mansion Truss Bridge | April 15, 1978 (#78003011) | June 10, 2005 | VA 640 over Staunton River | Mansion | |

== See also ==
- List of National Historic Landmarks in Virginia
- National Register of Historic Places listings in Virginia
