= Charles Haley =

American football player (born 1964)

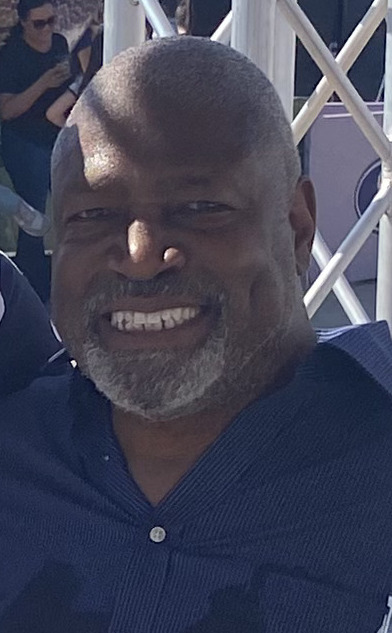
- Haley in 2024

No. 94, 95
- Positions: Defensive end, linebacker

Personal information
- Born: January 6, 1964 (age 62); Gladys, Virginia, U.S.
- Listed height: 6 ft 5 in (1.96 m)
- Listed weight: 252 lb (114 kg)

Career information
- High school: William Campbell (Naruna, Virginia)
- College: James Madison (1982–1985)
- NFL draft: 1986: 4th round, 96th overall pick

Career history
- San Francisco 49ers (1986–1991); Dallas Cowboys (1992–1996); San Francisco 49ers (1998–1999)

Awards and highlights
- 5× Super Bowl champion (XXIII, XXIV, XXVII, XXVIII, XXX); 2× First-team All-Pro (1990, 1994); 5× Pro Bowl (1988, 1990, 1991, 1994, 1995); PFWA NFL All-Rookie Team (1986); Dallas Cowboys Ring of Honor; San Francisco 49ers Hall of Fame; 2× First-team I-AA All-American (1984, 1985); James Madison Dukes No. 87 retired; NFL record: Most career sacks in the Super Bowl: 4.5 (tied) (Note: With Von Miller)

Career NFL statistics
- Tackles: 503
- Sacks: 100.5
- Safeties: 1
- Forced fumbles: 26
- Fumble recoveries: 8
- Pass deflections: 3
- Interceptions: 2
- Defensive touchdowns: 1
- Stats at Pro Football Reference
- Pro Football Hall of Fame
- College Football Hall of Fame

Charles Lewis Haley (born January 6, 1964) is an American former professional football player in the National Football League (NFL) for the San Francisco 49ers (1986–1991, 1998–1999) and Dallas Cowboys (1992–1996).

Haley began his career as a specialty outside linebacker, then played as a defensive end because of a defensive scheme change from the 3–4 to the 4–3 defense. He was the first five-time Super Bowl champion; only Tom Brady, with seven titles, has won more. He won two Super Bowls with the 49ers (XXIII, XXIV) and three with the Cowboys (XXVII, XXVIII, XXX); starting in all five championship games. Haley was inducted to the College Football Hall of Fame in 2011 and the Pro Football Hall of Fame in 2015.

== Early life ==
Haley was born in Gladys, Virginia. He attended William Campbell High School in Naruna, Virginia, where he was a three-year starter for the football team, playing linebacker and tight end. As a senior, he received defensive player of the year honors, All-Region III and All-Group AA accolades, while helping the team win the Seminole District championship. He also played basketball and was an All-district selection.

== College career ==
Haley was not highly recruited at the start of his senior season, so he accepted a scholarship from James Madison University, which at the time was the only Division I-A or I-AA school to make an offer. He was named a starter at defensive end / linebacker as a freshman, posting 85 tackles (second on the team), 5 sacks, 6 passes defensed, and 4 forced fumbles.

The next year, Haley was moved to inside linebacker, making 143 tackles (led the team) and 4 sacks. As a junior, he tallied 147 tackles (led the team), 3 sacks and 2 interceptions. In his final year he was switched to outside linebacker for the last four games, registering 131 tackles (second on the team), 5 quarterback sacks, 3 blocked kicks, and one interception.

Haley was a two-time Division I-AA All-American and finished his career with 506 tackles (school record), 17 sacks, and 3 interceptions. Haley is a member of the Xi Delta chapter of Alpha Phi Alpha fraternity at James Madison.

== Professional career ==
=== San Francisco 49ers (first stint) ===
Haley was selected by the San Francisco 49ers in the fourth round (96th overall) of the 1986 NFL draft, after dropping because he was initially timed at 4.8 seconds in the 40-yard dash, although he was later clocked by a 49ers scout at 4.55 seconds. He played outside linebacker in a 3–4 defense, finished second behind Leslie O'Neal for rookies with 12 sacks and was voted to the NFL All-Rookie team by Pro Football Weekly and the United Press International. The following year, he played again in a designated pass rusher role, coming into the game in likely passing situations, while making 25 tackles and 6.5 sacks.

In 1988, Haley was named the starter at left outside linebacker, registering 69 tackles, 11.5 sacks and would hold that spot through the 1991 season. He was named NFC Defensive Player of the Month for October. He was named to his first Pro Bowl for the 1988 season. The next year, he tallied 57 tackles and 10.5 sacks in the 1989 season.

In 1990, Haley had 58 tackles and nine passes defensed. He was third in the league with 16 sacks, voted the UPI NFC Defensive Player of the Year, and a consensus All-Pro.

In 1991, Haley's relationship with the organization began to deteriorate after safety Ronnie Lott was left unprotected-eligible to sign with any team under Plan B free agency. He still recorded 53 tackles, 6 passes defensed, 2 forced fumbles and 7 sacks, tying for the team lead with Larry Roberts. While with the 49ers from 1986 to 1991, he led the team in sacks every season, and played on the Super Bowl XXIII and Super Bowl XXIV championship teams.

On August 26, 1992, Haley's volatile temperament and clashes with head coach George Seifert prompted the team to trade him to the Dallas Cowboys in exchange for a 1993 second round selection (#56-Vincent Brisby) and a 1994 third round selection (#99-Alai Kalaniuvalu).

=== Dallas Cowboys ===
In 1992, Haley was moved to right defensive end in the Dallas Cowboys 4–3 defense, made 39 tackles, 6 sacks, and 42 quarterback pressures (led the team), and helped the team improve from 17th in total defense in 1991 to first.

In 1993, Haley made headlines after throwing his helmet at a wall in the locker room smashing a hole in the sheet rock following a home loss to the Buffalo Bills, showing his displeasure with the team's inability to sign holdout running back Emmitt Smith, which contributed to an 0–2 start and put the season in jeopardy. The Cowboys relented and reached an agreement with Smith the following week, getting them back on track and making them the first team to win a Super Bowl after starting a season 0–2. Haley registered 41 tackles, 4 sacks, 2 passes defensed, and 3 forced fumbles, but his recurring back problems began to require a series of surgeries.

In 1994, Haley recovered from off-season surgery (lumbar microdiscectomy) to post 68 tackles, 12.5 sacks, and 52 quarterback pressures. He immediately announced his retirement after losing 38–28 to the 49ers in the NFC Championship game, but decided to return after being offered a new contract. Haley received the UPI NFC Defensive Player of the Year Award and was a consensus All-Pro once again. He is often mentioned as the final piece that helped propel the Cowboys into a Super Bowl contender.

In 1995, Haley posted 10.5 sacks, 33 quarterback pressures, and 35 tackles in the first 10 games, until suffering a ruptured disk against the Washington Redskins, which derailed his season. He started in Super Bowl XXX six weeks after having back surgery, making one sack, 3 quarterback pressures, and 5 tackles. The next year, with the team trying to limit him to 30 plays per game, he appeared in the first three contests and in week 9 and 10 before being deactivated with a back injury. He retired after the season, because of his back injuries and his youngest daughter Brianna being diagnosed with leukemia.

=== San Francisco 49ers (second stint) ===
On January 2, 1999, Haley was signed by the 49ers after being out of football for almost two years to provide depth for an injury depleted defensive line in the playoffs (two games). He was re-signed for the 1999 season and tallied three sacks.

=== Career statistics ===
In his 12 NFL seasons, Haley recorded 100.5 quarterback sacks, two interceptions (nine return yards), and eight fumble recoveries, which he returned for nine yards and a touchdown. He was also selected to play in five Pro Bowls (1988, 1990, 1991, 1994, 1995) and was named NFL All-Pro in 1990 and 1994. In his first four seasons in Dallas, he was on three Super Bowl-winning teams: in 1992 (XXVII), 1993 (XXVIII), and 1995 (XXX). He was the first player with more than four Super Bowl Rings.

== Honors ==
Haley was elected to the Pro Football Hall of Fame in 2015 after several years of eligibility and his bust was sculpted by Scott Myers. Haley felt that his election may have been delayed by his image and behavior: "I thought that what you do on the field would govern whether you get in the Hall". On August 8, 2015, Haley was inducted at the Enshrinement Ceremony where his bust was unveiled. He was also inducted into the San Francisco 49ers Hall of Fame in 2015.

Prior to that, Haley was inducted into the Virginia Sports Hall of Fame in 2006, the College Football Hall of Fame in 2011, and the Texas Black Sports Hall of Fame in 2012. He was enshrined into the Dallas Cowboys Ring of Honor on November 6, 2011.

== Personal life ==
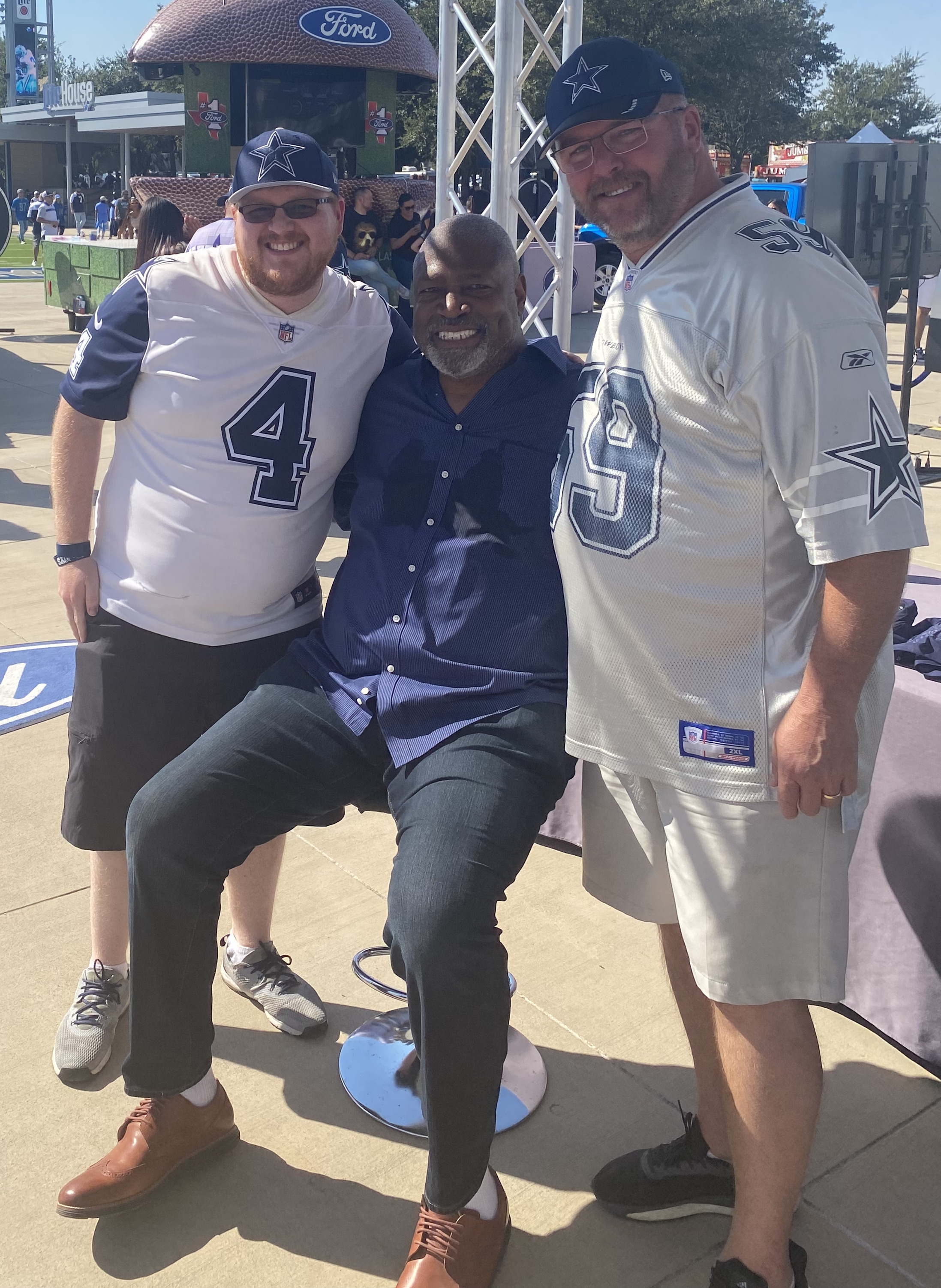
Haley with fans in 2024

After football, Haley was diagnosed with bipolar disorder and began to undergo therapy and to take medication. Haley was an assistant defensive coach for the Detroit Lions from 2001 to 2002. He is a special advisor mentoring rookies for both the Dallas Cowboys and San Francisco 49ers. He also has dedicated his life to help fund several local initiatives with organizations such as Jubilee Centre and The Salvation Army. He is the founder of Tackle Tomorrow which provides struggling schools in the Dallas area with reading programs and special teachers to help students improve their reading skills. Tackle Tomorrow is an active foundation with support from the Dallas community and other Cowboys such as Dak Prescott, DeMarcus Lawrence, Tony Tolbert, Troy Aikman, Emmitt Smith, Michael Irvin, and many others.

His daughter, Madison Haley, is a professional soccer player who currently plays for Brighton and Hove Albion in the Women's Premier League in England.
