= John Arrowsmith =

John Arrowsmith may refer to:

- John Arrowsmith (scholar) (1602–1659), Master of Trinity College, Cambridge
- John Arrowsmith (cartographer) (1780–1873), geographer and map publisher, nephew of the cartographer Aaron Arrowsmith
- John C. Arrowsmith (1894–1985), general in the United States Army Corps of Engineers
