= Cat Rock =

Cat Rock may refer to:

- Cat Rock Sluice of the Roanoke Navigation
- Castle Rock (Garrison, New York)
