= Gladys, Virginia =

Unincorporated community in Virginia, United States

- Unincorporated community
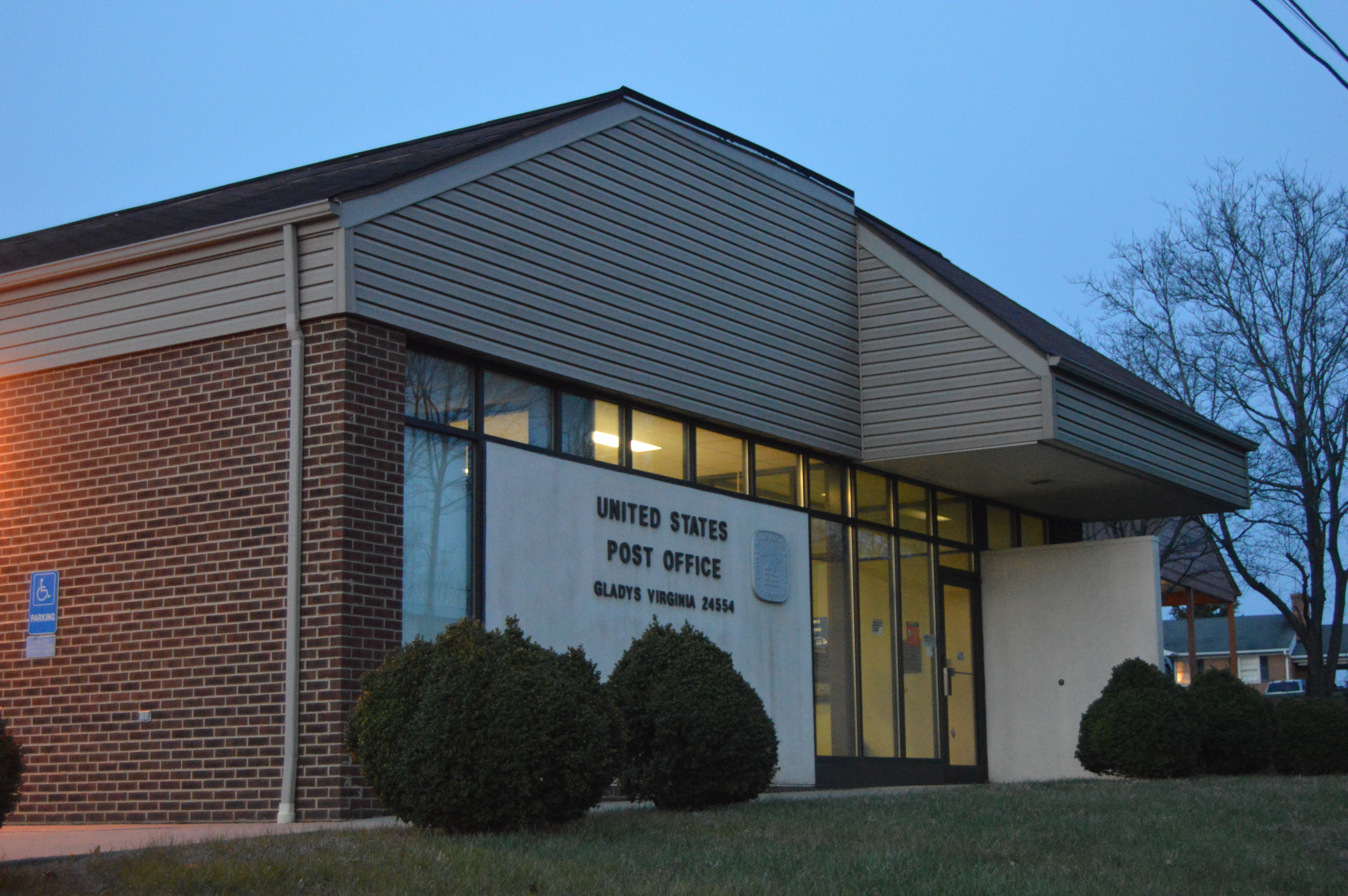
- Post office

- Location within Virginia Location within the United States
- Coordinates: 37°09′48″N 79°04′25″W
- Country: United States
- State: Virginia
- County: Campbell
- Elevation: 781 ft (238 m)
- Time zone: UTC−5 (Eastern (EST))
  - Summer (DST): UTC−4 (EDT)
- ZIP code: 24554
- Area code: 434
- GNIS feature ID: 1467129

Gladys is an unincorporated community in Campbell County, Virginia, United States. Gladys is on U.S. Route 501, 10.6 miles (17.1 km) northwest of Brookneal. Gladys has a post office with ZIP code 24554, which opened on April 4, 1836.

Shady Grove was listed on the National Register of Historic Places in 1982.

== Notable people ==
- Kevin Scott, Chief Technology Officer of Microsoft
- Charles Haley, Five-time Super Bowl Champion and member of both the Pro Football Hall of Fame and the College Football Hall of Fame
- Anthony Clark, actor and stand up comedian.
- Cedric Peerman, NFL running back
