= Lewis A. Pick =

United States Army general

Lewis Andrew Pick
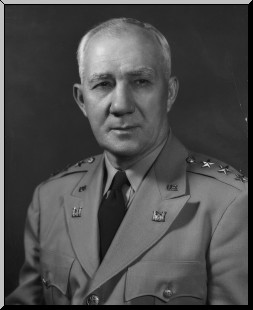
- Born: November 18, 1890; Brookneal, Virginia, United States
- Died: December 2, 1956 (aged 66); Washington, D.C., United States
- Military career
- Allegiance: United States
- Branch: United States Army
- Service years: 1917–1953
- Rank: Lieutenant General
- Service number: 0-8096
- Unit: United States Army Corps of Engineers
- Commands: Chief of Engineers (1949-1953)
- Conflicts: World War I World War II; Cold War
- Awards: Army Distinguished Service Medal (2)

Lieutenant General Lewis Andrew Pick (November 18, 1890 – December 2, 1956) was a United States Army officer who served as Chief of Engineers in the United States Army.

== Early life ==
Pick was born in Brookneal, Virginia. He was part of the first graduating class of Rustburg High School in 1910 and attended VPI, graduating in 1914. Pick received his Regular Army commission in the United States Army Corps of Engineers on July 1, 1917.

== Military career ==
During World War I, Pick served with the 23rd Engineers in France. He served in the Philippines from 1921 until 1923 and helped organize The 14th Engineer Regiment Philippine Scouts, largely composed of Filipino soldiers. He was the Corps of Engineers' District Engineer in New Orleans during the Great Mississippi Flood of 1927, and he helped coordinate federal relief efforts. Pick was named Missouri River Division Engineer in 1942, and with William Glenn Sloan of the Bureau of Reclamation he co-wrote the Pick-Sloan Plan for controlling the water resources of the Missouri River Basin.

Pick carefully wrote his plan to avoid flooding Bismarck and Williston, North Dakota, along with Pierre and Chamberlain, South Dakota, but intentionally flooded the entire productive acreage of the Mandan, Hidatsa, and Arikara Nation, some 155,000 acres, supporting 349 families of 1,544 individuals. United States Secretary of the Interior Julius Albert Krug ordered compensation in the form of an equal amount of acreage on lesser lands, at-cost hydroelectric power for irrigation, grazing and watering rights for tribal cattle, and $5,105,625 in payment for lost lands. Colonel Pick revoked this order and all its compensations, then denied the Three Tribes all access to the reservoir which would flood their lands, including the rights to fish, water their cattle, or cut any timber from the land to be flooded. The tribes were likewise forbidden to hire legal counsel with any compensatory money they might receive. The revised plan was approved by Krug.

Forced to sign the Pick-Sloan Plan contract, George Gillette, leader of the Three Tribes' business council, openly wept.

Colonel Pick was assigned to the China Burma India Theater of World War II in October 1943, replacing Brigadier General John C. Arrowsmith as Chief Road Engineer. He oversaw construction of the Ledo Road in British Raj India and Burma. His driving force enabled the difficult task to be completed in two and a half years. His men nicknamed the road "Pick's Pike".

After his return to the United States in 1945, he served again as Missouri River Division Engineer. On March 1, 1949, President of the United States Harry S. Truman appointed him Chief of Engineers. Pick was awarded the Distinguished Service Medal with Oak Leaf Cluster. Pick City, North Dakota, located by the Garrison Dam on the Missouri River was founded in 1946 and named for him. Pickstown, South Dakota, located by the Fort Randall Dam was also named for him. He died in Washington, D.C., and was buried in Auburn, Alabama.

== Personal life ==
Pick attended and played college football at Virginia Polytechnic Institute, and graduated in 1914. He was initiated into Theta Chi fraternity in 1924 at Auburn University, where he was a professor of military science and tactics. Pick married Alice Cary, one of the founding members of the Sigma Lambda chapter of Kappa Delta sorority at Auburn.

In 1948, Pick was elevated to National Honor Member by Chi Epsilon national civil engineering honor society.

The Lewis Andrew Pick Birthplace is a contributing property in the Brookneal Historic District.

== See also ==
- Pickstown, South Dakota
- Pick City, North Dakota

Military offices
| Preceded by Raymond A. Wheeler | Chief of Engineers; 1949–1953 | Succeeded by Samuel D. Sturgis III |
