= Westview (Brookneal, Virginia) =

Historic house in Virginia, United States

- U.S. National Register of Historic Places
- Virginia Landmarks Register
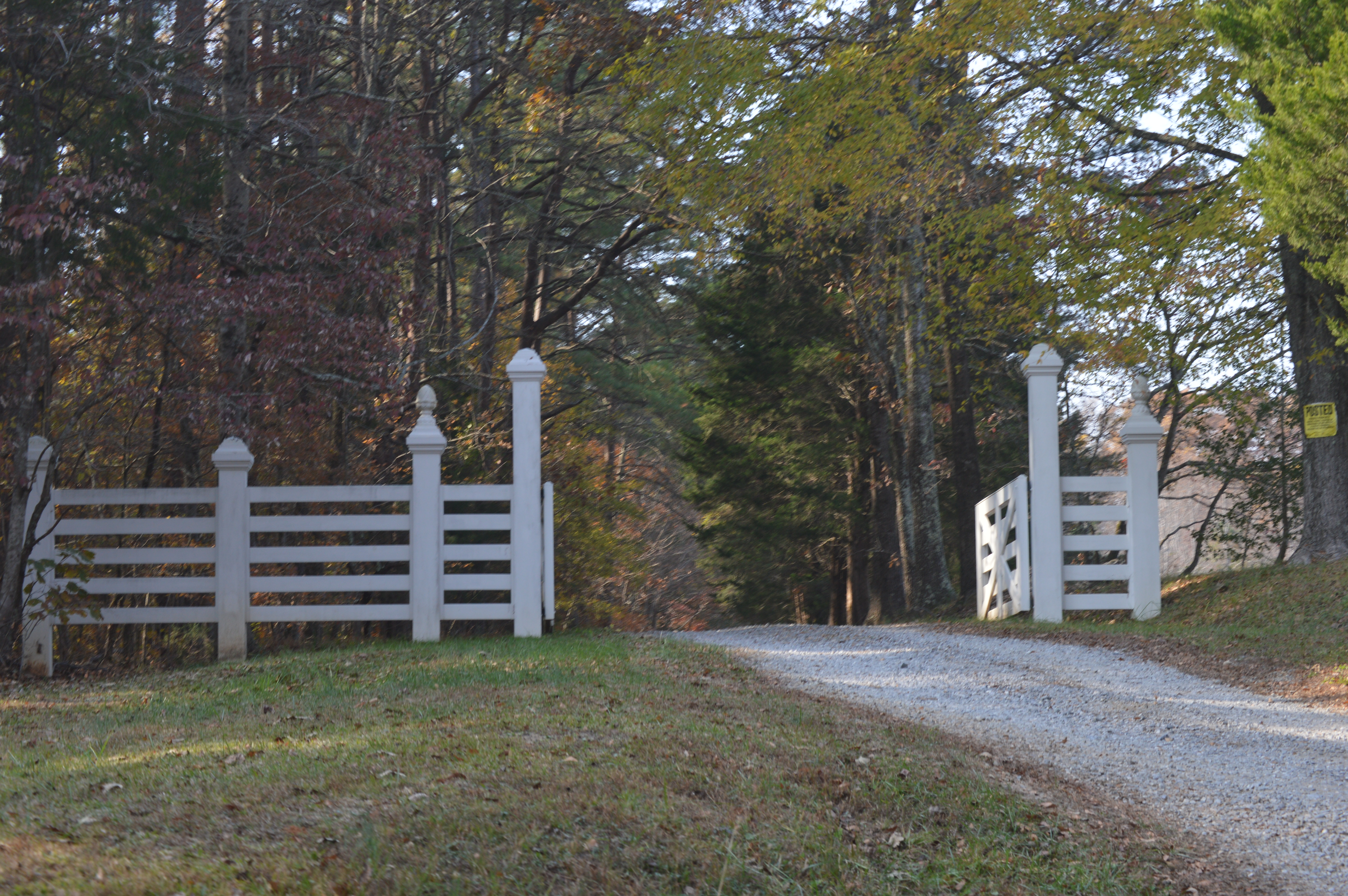
- Gate to the farmhouse driveway

- Location within Virginia Location within the United States
- Location: 1672 Terrell Rd., near Brookneal, Virginia
- Coordinates: 37°1′37″N 78°51′53″W
- Area: 82.3 acres (33.3 ha)
- Built: 1832
- Architectural style: Federal
- NRHP reference No.: 00000067
- VLR No.: 019-5169

Significant dates
- Added to NRHP: February 4, 2000
- Designated VLR: December 1, 1999

Westview, also known as the Elam Homestead and Terrell Place, is a historic plantation house and farm located in Charlotte County, Virginia; the nearest community is Brookneal, which is in Campbell County. It was built in 1832, and is a two-story, three-bay, single pile, brick dwelling in the Federal style. It has two later frame additions. Also on the property are three contributing log slave cabins, a frame milk house, log smokehouse, log schoolhouse, log shed, two barns, a stable / hay barn, ice pit, a family cemetery, and a slave cemetery.

It was listed on the National Register of Historic Places in 2000.
