= Cedric Peerman =

American football player (born 1986)

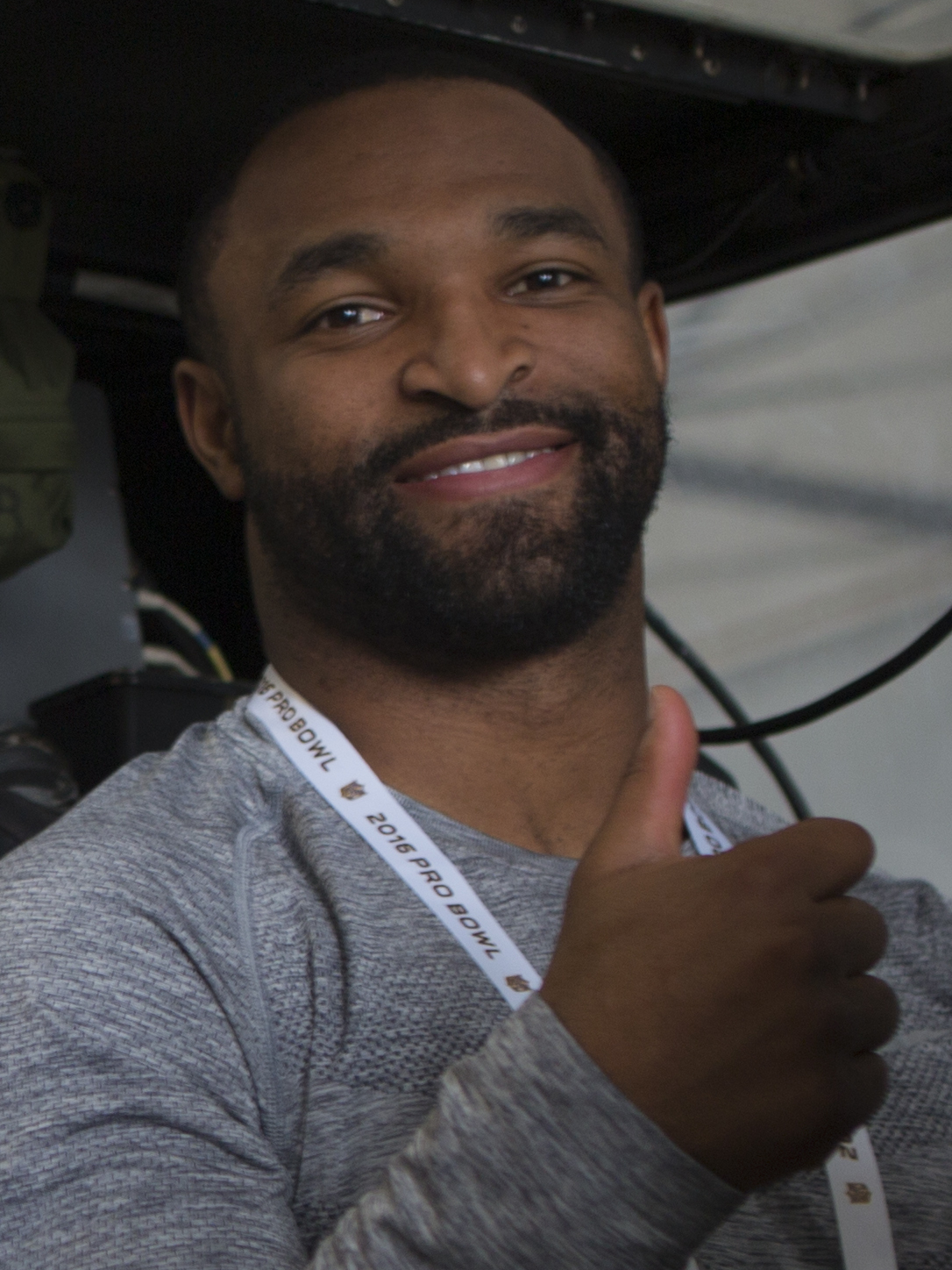
- Peerman in 2016

No. 30, 35
- Position: Running back

Personal information
- Born: October 10, 1986 (age 40); Lynchburg, Virginia, U.S.
- Listed height: 5 ft 10 in (1.78 m)
- Listed weight: 212 lb (96 kg)

Career information
- High school: William Campbell (Naruna, Virginia)
- College: Virginia
- NFL draft: 2009: 6th round, 185th overall pick

Career history
- Baltimore Ravens (2009)*; Cleveland Browns (2009); Detroit Lions (2009); Cincinnati Bengals (2010–2017)
- * Offseason or practice squad member only

Awards and highlights
- Pro Bowl (2015)

Career NFL statistics
- Rushing yards: 349
- Rushing average: 5.0
- Rushing touchdowns: 1
- Receptions: 13
- Receiving yards: 123
- Stats at Pro Football Reference

Cedric Edwin Peerman (born October 10, 1986) is an American former professional football player who was a running back in the National Football League (NFL). He was selected by the Baltimore Ravens in the sixth round of the 2009 NFL draft and was also a member of the Cleveland Browns, Detroit Lions, and Cincinnati Bengals. He played college football for the Virginia Cavaliers.

== Early life ==
Peerman was born in Lynchburg, Virginia to parents Stanley and Melissa Peerman. Peerman grew up working on his family's tobacco farm in Gladys, Virginia. He attended William Campbell High School in Naruna, Virginia. There, he was a four-year starter and played on both offense and defense. He set the Virginia state record for career scoring with 708 points. In his sophomore year, he was moved from wide receiver to running back and rushed for more than 1,000 yards. As a junior, he rushed for 2,048 yards and 43 touchdowns, and caught 22 passes for 367 yards and seven touchdowns. As a senior, he attempted 222 rushes for 2,016 yards and 43 touchdowns. He was twice named first-team all-state and, as a senior, was named the Virginia state player of the year. Peerman was also named a PrepStar All-American.

Peerman was also a standout sprinter and long jumper for the high school track team. He was state champion in the 100 meters as a junior and senior. He also placed fourth in the long jump and triple jump, and eighth in the shot put to lead his school to state championship as a senior.

== College career ==
Peerman attended the University of Virginia where he majored in sociology. He sat out the 2004 season as a redshirt. In 2005, he saw action in every game with a start against Syracuse. He recorded 237 rushing yards, ranking sixth among Atlantic Coast Conference (ACC) freshmen. He also averaged 25.8 yards per kickoff return, tying for second in the ACC. Peerman was Virginia's all-purpose yardage leader with 793 yards. In 2006, he saw action in all 12 games, including a start against Wyoming. He again led the team in kick returns with 519 yards (27.3 yards per return). Peerman attempted 46 carries for a gain of 153 yards. In 2007, Peerman suffered a season-ending foot injury early in the team's sixth game. Nevertheless, he was Virginia's leading rusher with 585 yards. In 2008, Peerman saw action in 11 games. He was Virginia's leading rusher and leading scorer, with 153 carries for 774 yards and seven touchdowns. He ranked third in receiving, with 44 receptions for 193 yards. Peerman also returned five kicks for 108 yards.

== Professional career ==
=== Pre-draft ===
Pre-draft measurables
Height	Weight	40-yard dash	10-yard split	20-yard split	20-yard shuttle	Three-cone drill	Vertical jump	Broad jump	Bench press
5 ft 10 in (1.78 m)	216 lb (98 kg)	4.34 s	1.40 s	2.54 s	4.29 s	6.99 s	40 in (1.02 m)	9 ft 9 in (2.97 m)	27 reps
All values from NFL Combine.

NFL Draft Scout had rated him 14th out of 176 prospective running backs for the 2009 NFL draft.

=== Baltimore Ravens ===
Peerman was selected in the sixth round (185th overall) of the 2009 NFL draft by the Baltimore Ravens. He was waived during final cuts on September 5.

=== Cleveland Browns ===
Peerman was claimed off waivers by the Cleveland Browns on September 6, 2009. After being inactive for the first two games of the season, Peerman was waived on September 26 when the team signed placekicker Billy Cundiff. The Browns re-signed Peerman to their practice squad on September 29. He was released on October 28.

=== Detroit Lions ===
Peerman was signed to the Detroit Lions practice squad on October 30. He was promoted to the active roster on December 15 after running back Kevin Smith was placed on injured reserve.

He was waived on April 26, 2010.

=== Cincinnati Bengals ===
Peerman was claimed off waivers by the Cincinnati Bengals on April 27, 2010. For two seasons, Peerman served as a backup, rushing a total of only five times. During the 2012 season he had two long runs off fake punts and he also carried the ball 34 times for 178 yards.

On March 7, 2013, the Bengals re-signed Peerman on a two-year deal. He served as the special teams captain for the 2014 and 2015 seasons. Peerman was named to his first Pro Bowl for the 2015 season as a special teams player.

On September 4, 2016, Peerman was placed on injured reserve with an elbow injury. He was activated off injured reserve on November 26, 2016.

On March 23, 2017, Peerman re-signed with the Bengals. He was placed on injured reserve on August 29, 2017, after suffering a shoulder injury.

== Personal life ==
Peerman graduated in May 2008 with a degree in sociology and took graduate courses during his fifth year at Virginia. During the 2012 offseason, Peerman served as a pastoral intern for Dr. Keith Goad at Jefferson Park Baptist Church in Charlottesville, VA. He is married to Dr. Hagar Elgendy, and they have five children, including twins.
