= Kevin Scott (computer scientist) =

Chief Technology Officer at Microsoft (born 1972)

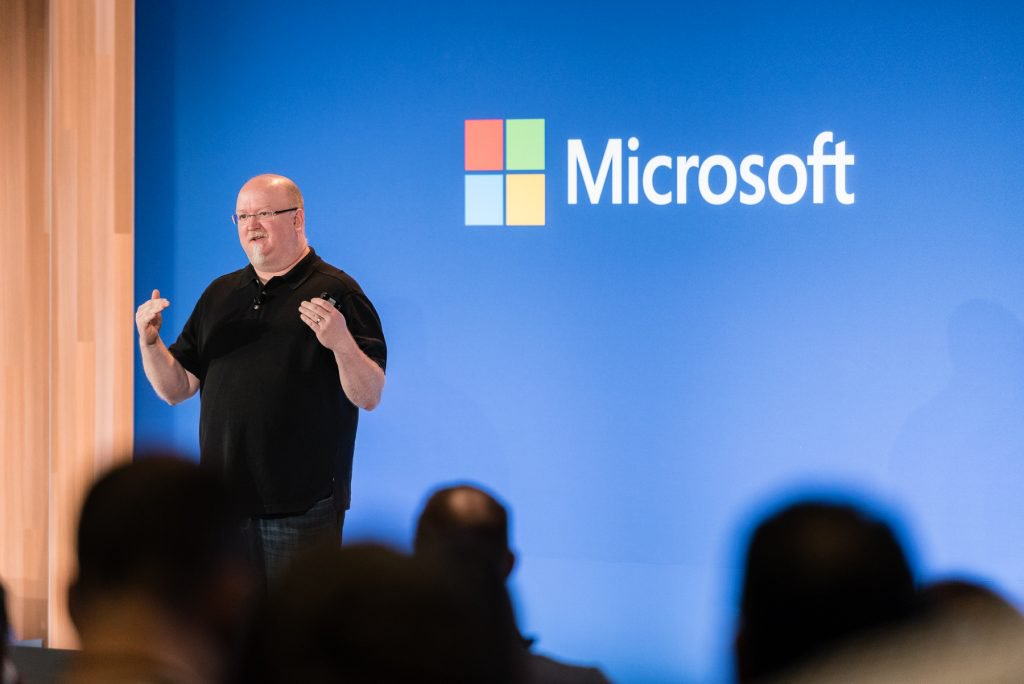
- Scott in 2018
- Born: 1972 (age 53–54)
- Education: Lynchburg College; Wake Forest University; University of Virginia
- Occupations: Chief Technology Officer, Microsoft

Kevin Scott (born 1972) is chief technology officer at Microsoft. He was previously Senior Vice President of Engineering and Operations at LinkedIn from February 2011 to January 2017.

== Education ==
Kevin Scott grew up in Gladys, Virginia. He holds a bachelor's degree from Lynchburg College in computer science and a master's degree from Wake Forest University in computer science.

He enrolled in a Ph.D. program at the University of Virginia.

== Career ==
After dropping out of his doctoral program in 2003, Scott started his career at Google and held numerous positions in search and ads engineering, including receiving a Google Founders' Award, before leaving the company in 2007. He was VP of engineering and operations at AdMob from July 2007 to June 2010. Google acquired AdMob in 2010 for $750 million (~$1.05 billion in 2024) and Scott became Sr. Engineering Director of mobile ads engineering at Google.

=== LinkedIn ===
Scott joined professional networking site LinkedIn in February 2011, as senior vice president for engineering. LinkedIn held its initial public offering in May 2011, and Scott was credited with scaling the company's computer systems to keep up with accelerating demand. Business Insider called Scott "the engineer who saved LinkedIn".

=== Microsoft ===
In January 2017, soon after Microsoft acquired LinkedIn, Scott was named Microsoft's chief technology officer by CEO Satya Nadella. He retained the title of senior vice president of infrastructure at LinkedIn until September 2017. Scott described himself as feeling "like a kid in a candy store" because of all the exciting technologies Microsoft is working on.

=== Nonprofits and boards ===
Scott is the founder of Behind the Tech, a non-profit organization that profiles people who work in technology on its website through photographs and interviews with the goal of inspiring others. In 2014, Scott and his wife, Shannon Hunt-Scott, created The Scott Foundation, a San Francisco Bay Area organization that focuses on issues such as education, hunger, and STEM for children. He is also an emeritus trustee of the Anita Borg Institute and was a founding member of the ACM Professions Board. He advises several startups, is on the board of directors for Magic, and is an angel investor. Since January 17, 2021, he is member of the board of directors of the automobile manufacturer Stellantis as non-executive Director and member of its ESG Committee.

== Personal life ==
Scott is married and has two children. He lives in Los Gatos, California.

== Works ==
- Scott, Kevin; Shaw, Greg (2020). Reprogramming the American Dream: From Rural America to Silicon Valley―Making AI Serve Us All. Harper Business. ISBN 0-06-287987-1.
