= Mount Athos (Kelly, Virginia) =

Archaeological site in Virginia, United States

- U.S. National Register of Historic Places
- Virginia Landmarks Register
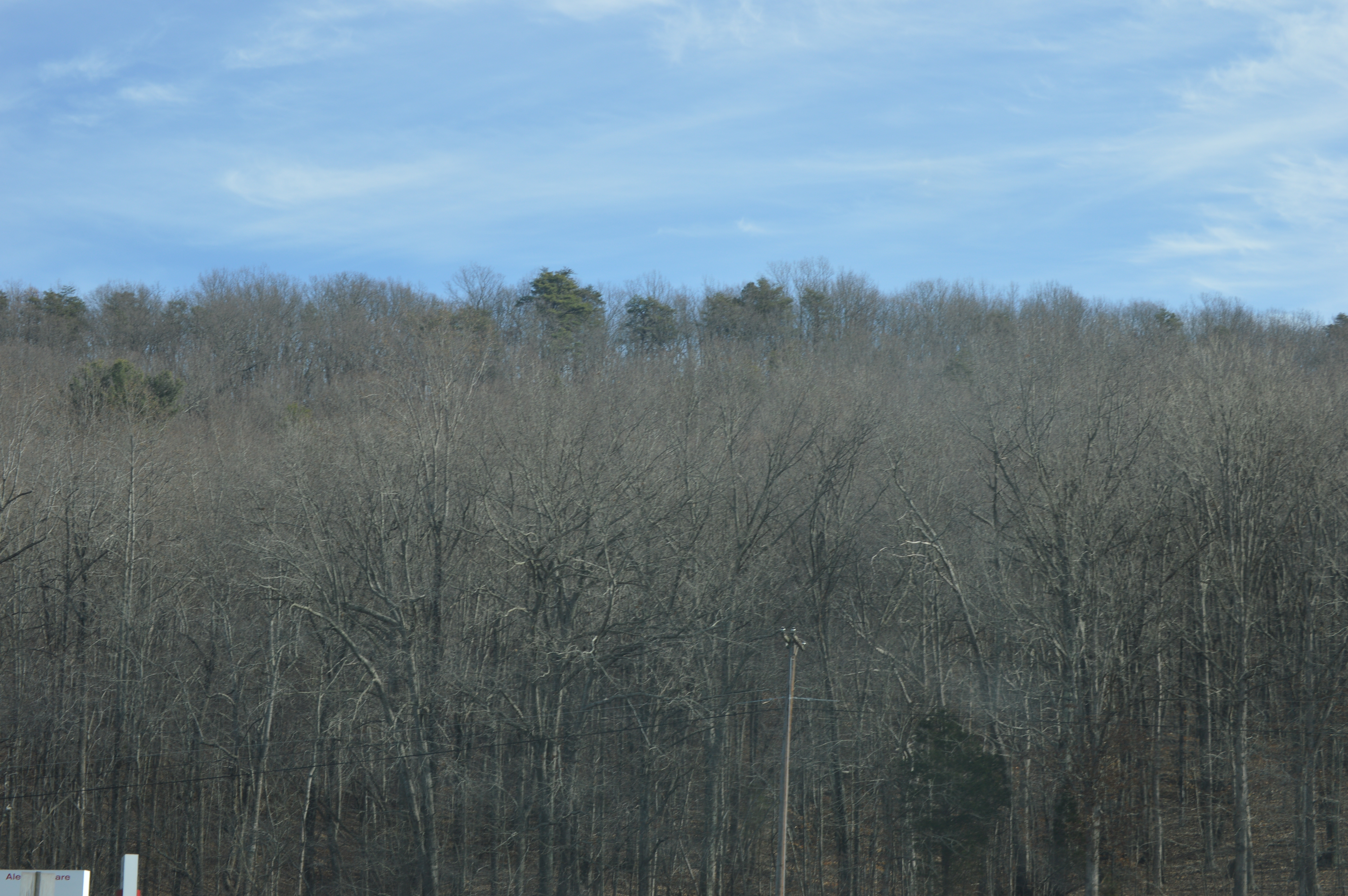
- Western side of the mountain; the estate sits on the wooded summit
- Nearest city: Lynchburg, Virginia
- Area: 280 acres (110 ha)
- Built: 1800
- NRHP reference No.: 75002016
- VLR No.: 015-0019

Significant dates
- Added to NRHP: July 24, 1975
- Designated VLR: February 18, 1975

Mount Athos is a historic archaeological site located at Kelly, Campbell County, Virginia. It consists of a stone ruin atop a wooded ridge overlooking the James River.

The property was originally owned by John Bolling (1700–1757), and was part of a larger tract of land called Buffalo Lick. Buffalo Lick was divided by Bolling's sons after his death and his son Archibald Bolling name his portion "Mount Athos Plantation". The property was sold to William J. Lewis (1766–1828) about 1796. Lewis built a plantation house there about 1800, a one-story dwelling with a classical portico and polygonal projections inspired by the architecture of Thomas Jefferson, of whom Lewis was a friend. It was destroyed by fire in 1876.

It was listed on the National Register of Historic Places in 1975.
