= Long Island, Virginia =

Unincorporated community in Virginia, United States

- Unincorporated community
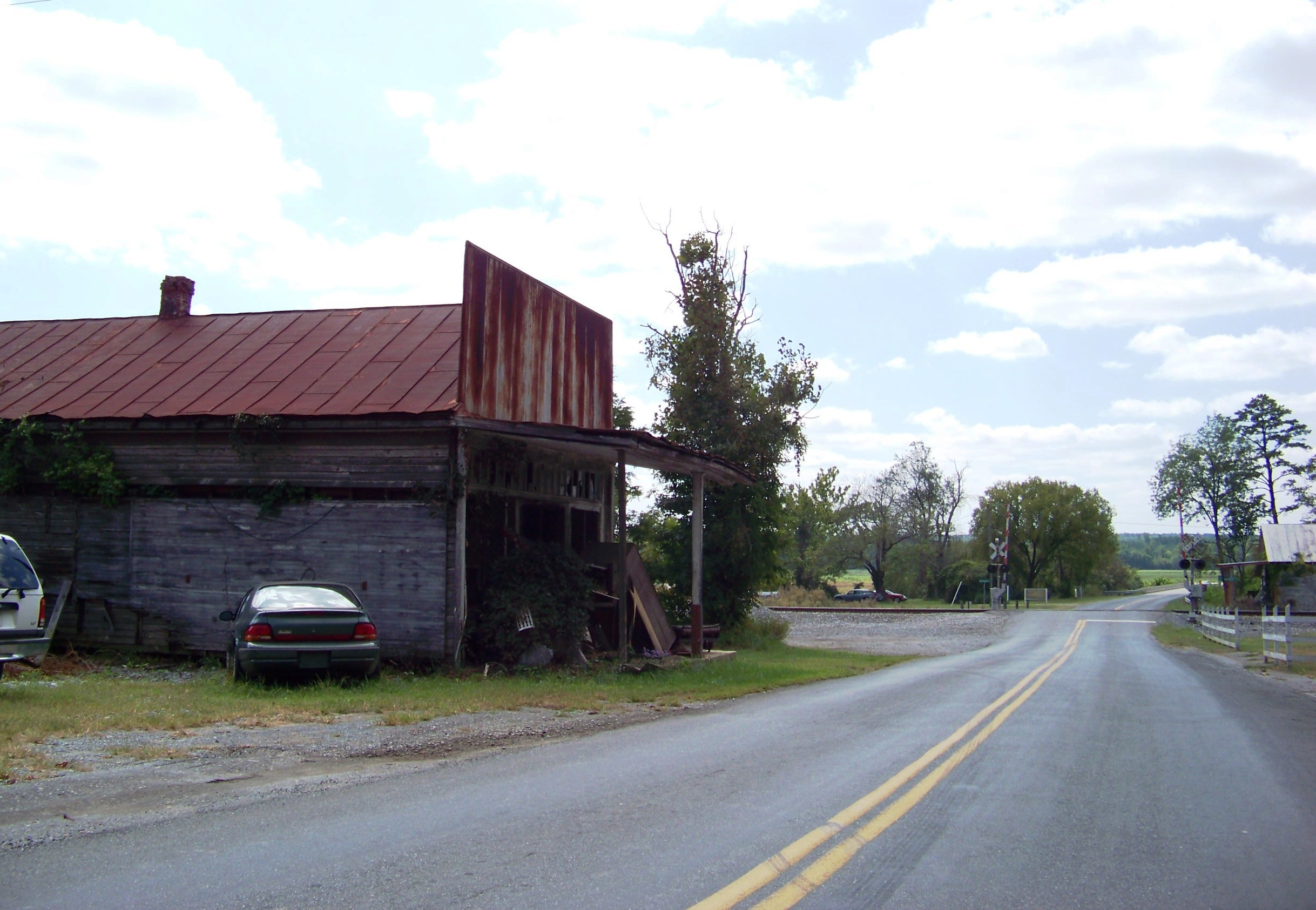
- Westbound VSR 761 running through Long Island before crossing a former Norfolk and Western Railway line, and later the Staunton River.

- Location within Virginia Location within the United States
- Coordinates: 37°04′43″N 79°05′39″W
- Country: United States
- State: Virginia
- County: Campbell
- Elevation: 558 ft (170 m)
- Time zone: UTC-5 (Eastern (EST))
  - Summer (DST): UTC-4 (EDT)
- Area code: 434
- GNIS feature ID: 1495868

Long Island is an unincorporated community in Campbell County, Virginia, United States. Long Island is located along the Roanoke River, (also known as the Staunton River) east-southeast of Altavista. The town center of Long Island is on the other side of the river from the island that gave the community its name.

The main road through the community is Virginia Secondary Route 761 (Long Island Road), and the community is almost entirely agricultural. A former Norfolk and Western Railway line runs through the community on the northeast bank of the Staunton River. A boat ramp exists south of VSR 761.

Green Hill was listed on the National Register of Historic Places in 1969.
