= Caryswood =

Historic home in Virginia, United States

- U.S. National Register of Historic Places
- Virginia Landmarks Register
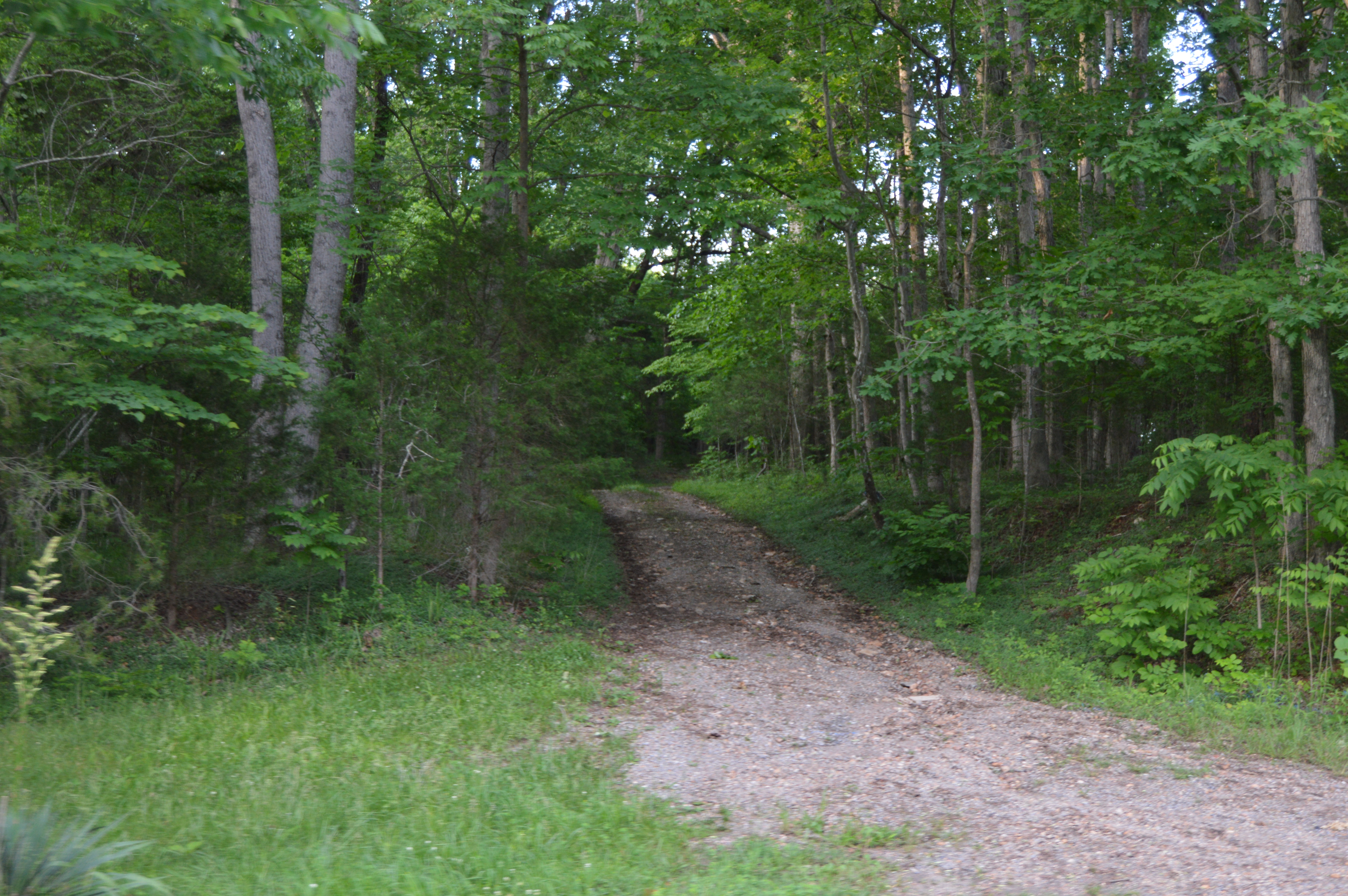
- Entrance to the property

- Location within Virginia Location within the United States
- Location: 8291 State Route 24 east of Evington, Virginia
- Coordinates: 37°13′57″N 79°15′11″W
- Area: 15 acres (6.1 ha)
- Built: 1855
- Built by: James Womack
- Architectural style: Mid 19th Century Revival, Greek Revival, Late Victorian, Italianate
- NRHP reference No.: 10000089
- VLR No.: 015-5147

Significant dates
- Added to NRHP: March 17, 2010
- Designated VLR: December 17, 2009

Caryswood is a historic home located near Evington, Campbell County, Virginia. It was built about 1855 and is a two-story frame building in an “L” configuration, covered by a low, hipped roof. It has a two-story, rear addition, with a one-story kitchen extension. The house is covered in flush (presumably ship-lapped or tongue-and-groove) siding, which creates a regular, smooth, somewhat monolithic appearance. The house features Italianate and Greek Revival decorative details. On this property, you will find an 1856 stable, the remains of an icehouse, a smokehouse, and an office.

It was listed on the National Register of Historic Places in 2010.
