= Shady Grove (Gladys, Virginia) =

Historic house in Virginia, United States

- U.S. National Register of Historic Places
- Virginia Landmarks Register
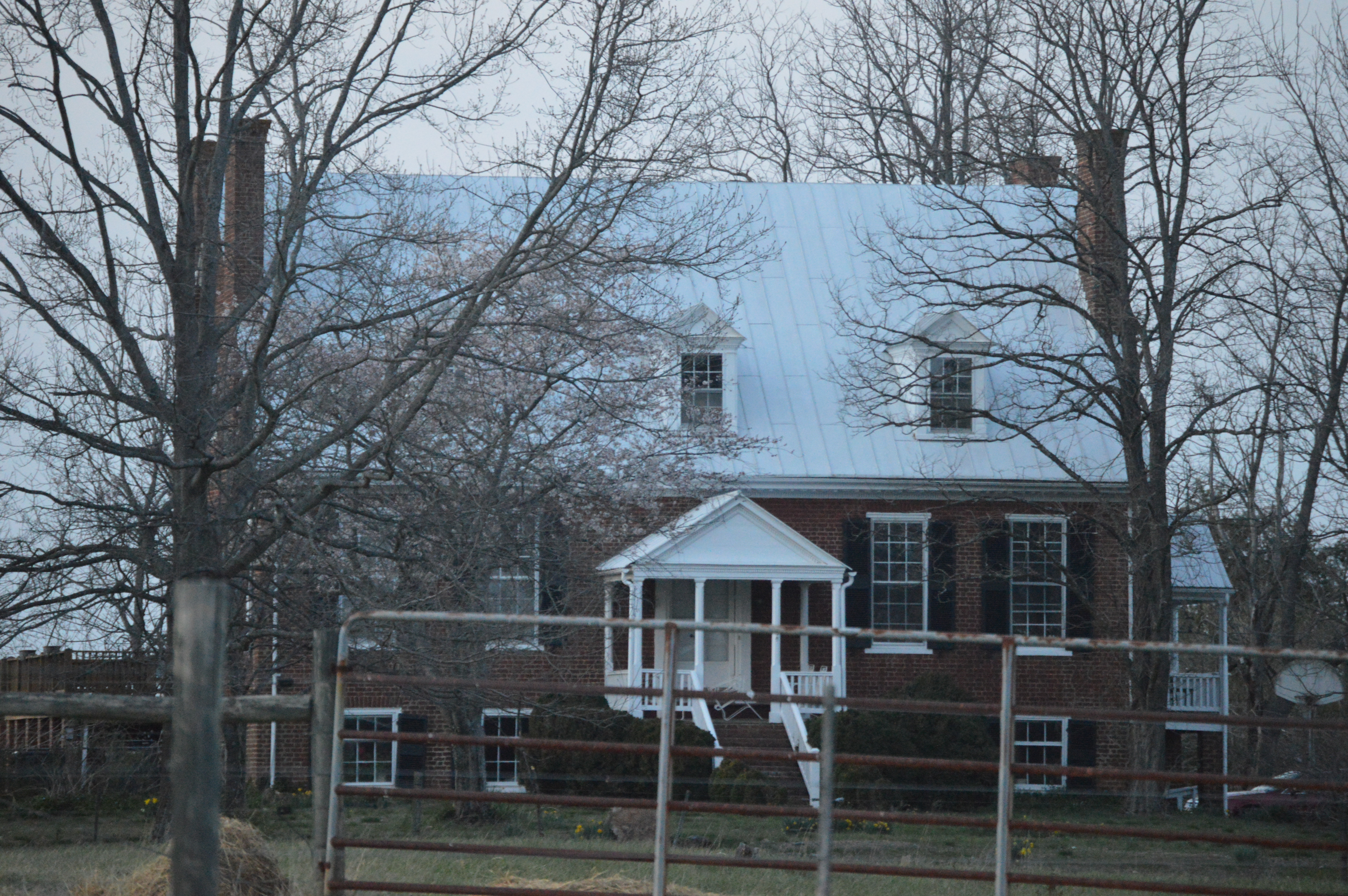
- Front of the house

- Location within Virginia Location within the United States
- Location: E of Gladys on Mollies Creek Road, near Gladys, Virginia
- Coordinates: 37°10′21″N 79°02′54″W
- Area: 27 acres (11 ha)
- Built: 1825
- Architectural style: Federal
- NRHP reference No.: 82004548
- VLR No.: 015-0013

Significant dates
- Added to NRHP: August 26, 1982
- Designated VLR: May 18, 1982

Shady Grove is a historic home located near Gladys, Campbell County, Virginia. It was built in 1825, and is a 1 1/2-story, brick Federal-style farmhouse with a gable roof. The house has double-pile, center-passage plan. The house was built by Paulina Cabell Henry on land inherited from her father, Dr. George Cabell of Point of Honor, Lynchburg, Virginia.

It was listed on the National Register of Historic Places in 1982.
