= John C. Arrowsmith =

United States Army general (1894–1985)

John Caraway Arrowsmith
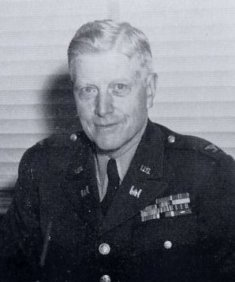
- Born: June 4, 1894; Reno, Nevada, US
- Died: June 1, 1985 (aged 90); Asheville, North Carolina, US
- Burial place: Arlington National Cemetery
- Military career
- Allegiance: United States of America
- Branch: United States Army
- Rank: Brigadier General
- Conflicts: World War I World War II
- Awards: Legion of Merit (2); Bronze Star Medal

John Caraway Arrowsmith (June 4, 1894 – June 1, 1985) was a Brigadier general in the United States Army Corps of Engineers, commanding the 45th Engineers in the China-Burma-India Theater of Operations during World War II.

Arrowsmith was commissioned a second lieutenant in 1918, promoted to first lieutenant in 1919, while stationed at Camp Fremont California. During the 1920s he was detailed to the 3rd Engineer Regiment, Schofield Barracks, Hawaii, the 2nd Cincinnati Engineer District, and the 13th Engineer Regiment, Camp Humphreys, VA. From 1930 to 1933 he was assigned to the San Francisco Engineer District, and promoted to captain in 1933. He was detailed to the Office of the Corps of Engineers in Washington, D.C. from April 1933 to July 1938, when he was assigned to the Missouri River Division, COE. He was promoted to major in 1940, and lieutenant colonel in 1942, when he was sent to Camp Blanding, Florida. as commander of the 45th Engineer General Service Regiment. In Nov. 1942 he went with these troops to India, where Arrowsmith was placed in command of Base Section 3 in Ledo, Assam, which was responsible for construction of the Ledo Road. Under Arrowsmith's command, the road reached the Patkai mountains and crossed into Burma. Stillwell, while recognizing the problems that diversion of roadbuilding assets to airfield construction had caused, was still unsatisfied with progress and began searching for a replacement. Lewis A. Pick replaced him as Chief Road Engineer in October 1943, but retained command of the 45th Eng, GSR. While Arrowsmith received a temporary promotion in July 1943 to brigadier general, he reverted to colonel in Jan. 1944. In Feb. 1944 he was detailed to the XXI Corps as Corps Engineer at Camp Polk, La., later accompanying these troops into France and Germany.

From Sept. 1945 to Nov. 1947 he was assigned to the U.S. Office of Military Government for Germany. From Jan. 1948 to Oct. 1949 he was commanding officer of the Engineer Research and Development Laboratories at Fort Belvoir. In Nov. 1949 he received his last assignment as a Deputy Chief in the Army Security Agency. He retired from the military in May 1953 as a brigadier general. He died in 1985 and is buried in Arlington National Cemetery with his wife Nell B. (1895–1986).

== Decorations ==
Legion of Merit with Oak Leaf Cluster
Bronze Star Medal
Army Commendation Medal
World War I Victory Medal
American Defense Service Medal
American Campaign Medal
Asiatic-Pacific Campaign Medal with three Service Stars
European-African-Middle Eastern Campaign Medal with one Service Star
World War II Victory Medal
Army of Occupation Medal
National Defense Service Medal
Croix de Guerre 1939–1945 with Palm (France)
