= Kelly, Virginia =

Unincorporated community in Virginia, United States

- Unincorporated community
- Location within Virginia Location within the United States
- Coordinates: 37°23′14″N 79°3′36″W
- Country: United States
- State: Virginia
- County: Campbell
- Elevation: 659 ft (201 m)
- Time zone: UTC-5 (Eastern (EST))
  - Summer (DST): UTC-4 (EDT)
- ZIP code: 24576
- Area code: 434
- GNIS feature ID: 1471326

Kelly is an unincorporated community in Campbell County, Virginia, United States. Kelly is located along U.S. Route 460, 4.8 miles (7.7 km) east-southeast of downtown Lynchburg.

Mount Athos, which is listed on the National Register of Historic Places, is located in Kelly.
