= Evington, Virginia =

Unincorporated community in Virginia, United States

- Unincorporated community
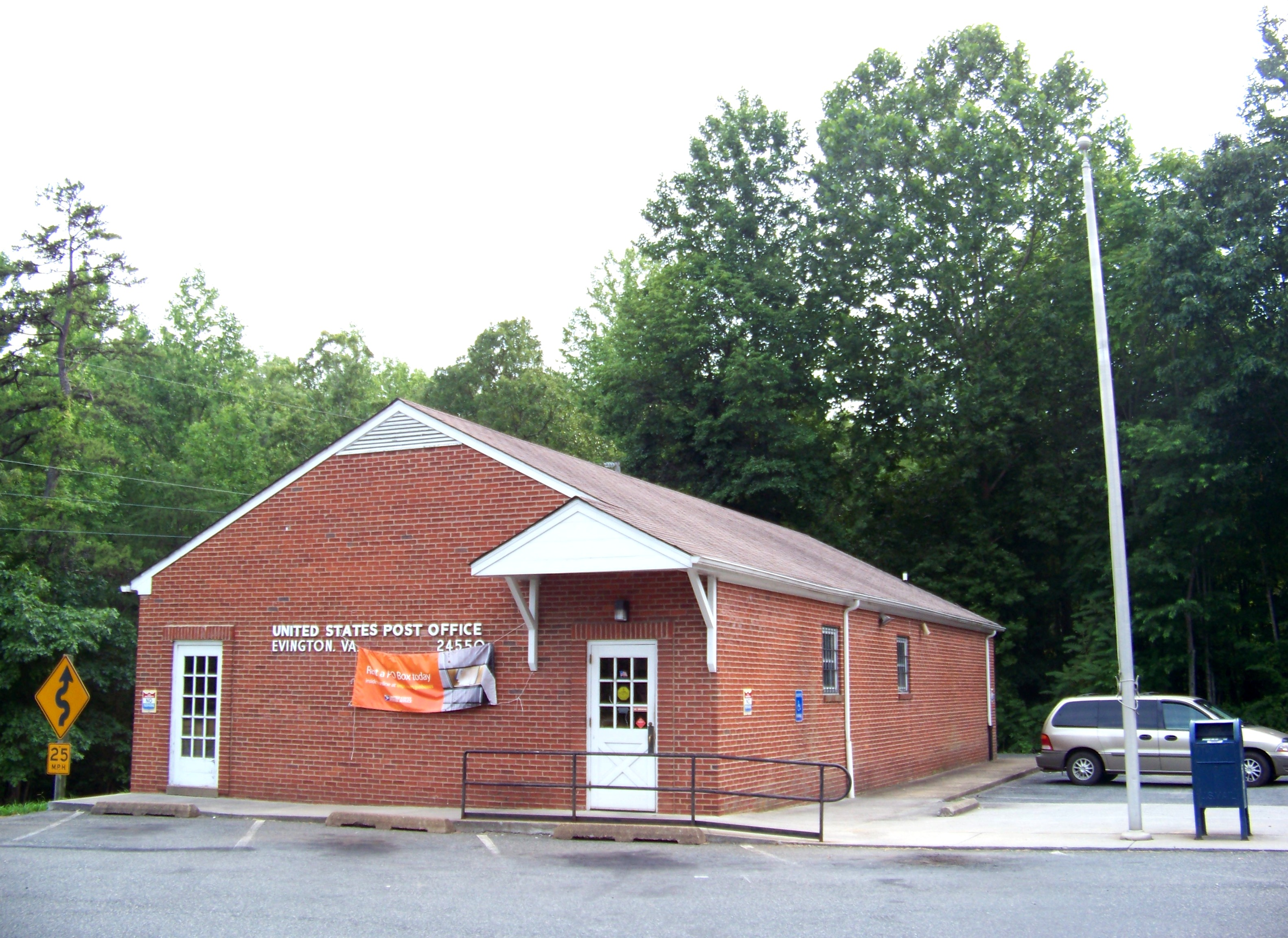
- Post office in Evington

- Location within Virginia Location within the United States
- Coordinates: 37°14′02″N 79°17′22″W
- Country: United States
- State: Virginia
- County: Campbell
- Elevation: 696 ft (212 m)
- Time zone: UTC-5 (Eastern (EST))
  - Summer (DST): UTC-4 (EDT)
- ZIP code: 24550
- Area code: 434
- GNIS feature ID: 1495519

Evington is an unincorporated community in Campbell County, Virginia, United States. Evington is located along Virginia State Route 24, west of U.S. Highway 29, southwest of Lynchburg.

Caryswood was listed on the National Register of Historic Places in 2010. Bob Good, the former congressman for Virginia's 5th congressional district, lives in Evington.

== Climate ==
The climate in this area is characterized by hot, humid summers and generally mild to cool winters. According to the Köppen Climate Classification system, Evington has a humid subtropical climate, abbreviated "Cfa" on climate maps.

== Notable person ==
- Bob Good, former U.S. representative and Campbell County supervisor

== See also ==
- WSET-TV
