= Cat Rock Sluice of the Roanoke Navigation =

- U.S. National Register of Historic Places
- Virginia Landmarks Register
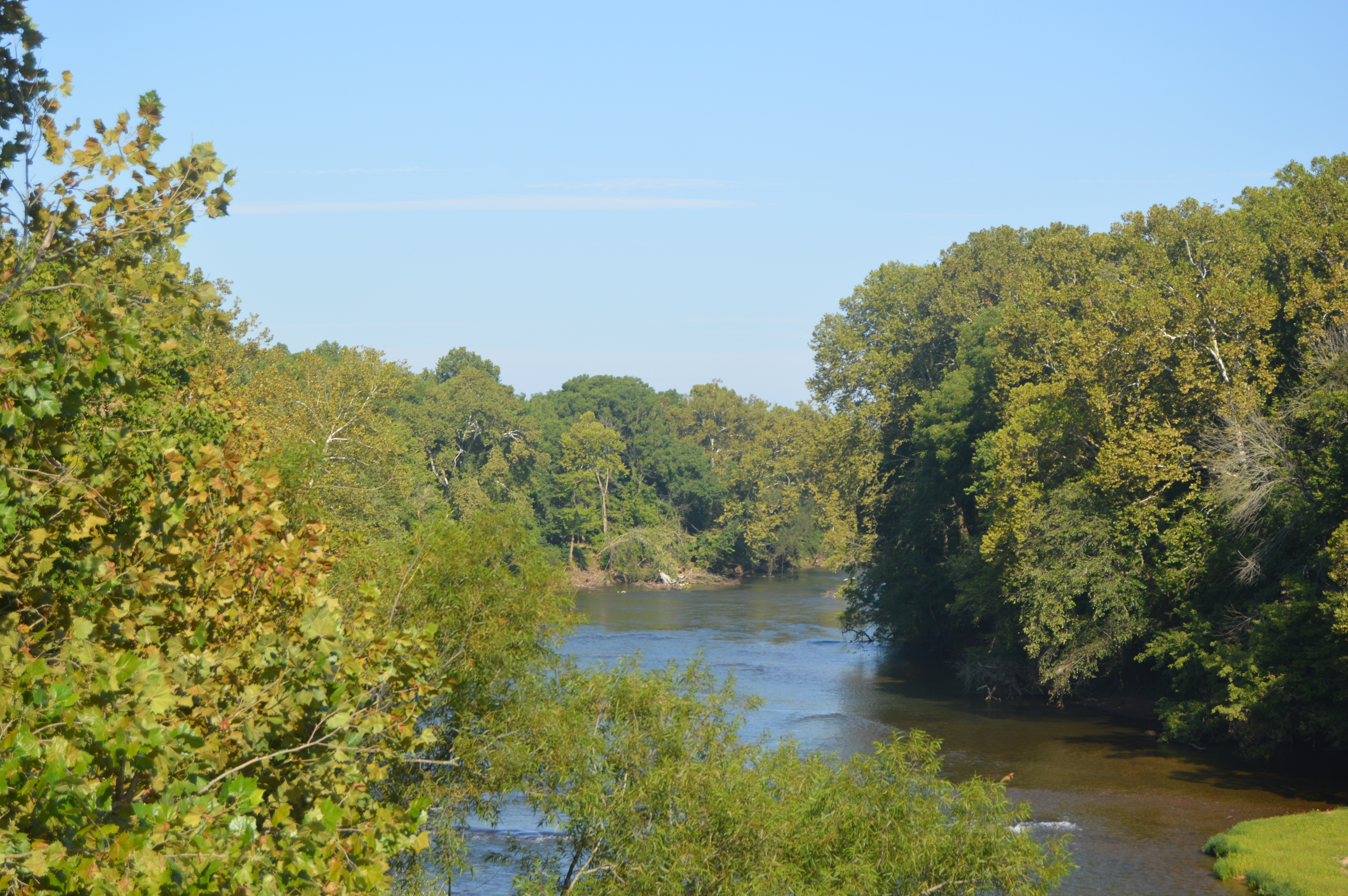
- Looking upstream from U.S. Route 501

- Location within Virginia Location within the United States
- Location: West of Brookneal, Virginia
- Coordinates: 37°2′35″N 78°57′38″W
- Area: 4 acres (1.6 ha)
- Built: 1827
- Built by: Samuel Pannill
- NRHP reference No.: 80004177
- VLR No.: 015-0217

Significant dates
- Added to NRHP: March 25, 1980
- Designated VLR: December 20, 1977

Cat Rock Sluice of the Roanoke Navigation is a historic sluice located near Brookneal, Campbell County, Virginia. Cat Rock Sluice is at Staunton Scenic River Mile 9.85. It consists of a deep cut about 10 feet wide, blasted through the south end of a wide rock ledge and extending across the main river channel. Associated with it is a "towing wall" measuring about 6 feet thick and at least 5 feet high. The wall was probably originally continuous, from about 50 feet above the cut to 300 feet below it. The 11-mile network of sluices and associated wing dams and towing walls was constructed by Samuel Pannill of Green Hill in 1827. It was built for the Roanoke Navigation Company to permit the passage of poled river boats, called batteaux, through the falls of the Staunton River.

It was listed on the National Register of Historic Places in 1980.
