= Oak Grove (Altavista, Virginia) =

Historic house in Virginia, US

- U.S. National Register of Historic Places
- Virginia Landmarks Register
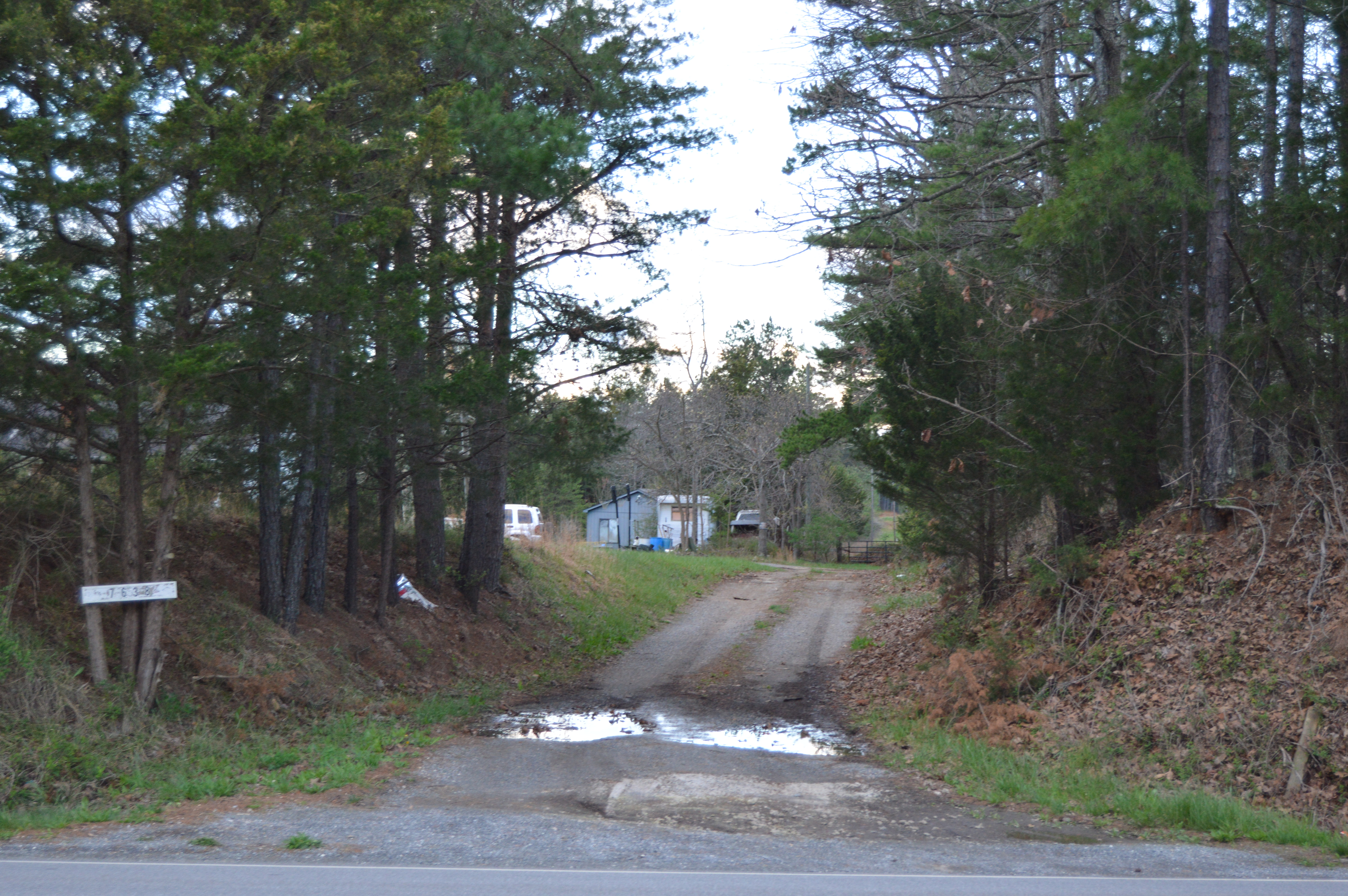
- Eastern entrance to the estate

- Location within Virginia Location within the United States
- Location: 7378 Gladys Rd., Altavista, Virginia
- Coordinates: 37°7′4″N 79°13′34″W
- Area: 8 acres (3.2 ha)
- Built: c. 1750, c. 1784, c. 1833
- Architectural style: Federal
- NRHP reference No.: 02000516
- VLR No.: 015-5103

Significant dates
- Added to NRHP: May 16, 2002
- Designated VLR: December 5, 2001

Oak Grove is a historic plantation house located near Altavista, Campbell County, Virginia. It was built in stages between the 1750s and 1833. The oldest section is a two-story dog-trot log structure built around 1750. The house was enlarged in 1784, and completed around 1833 by adding a west wing. It is a two-story, three bay structure containing a large hall and a parlor on the first floor and a stair hall and two bedrooms on the second in the Federal style. Also on the property are a contributing smokehouse, a slave quarter, a grain shed, a hay barn, and a privy as well as the remains of a kitchen and an icehouse.

It was listed on the National Register of Historic Places in 2002.
