= Brookneal Historic District =

Historic district in Virginia, United States

- U.S. National Register of Historic Places
- U.S. Historic district
- Virginia Landmarks Register
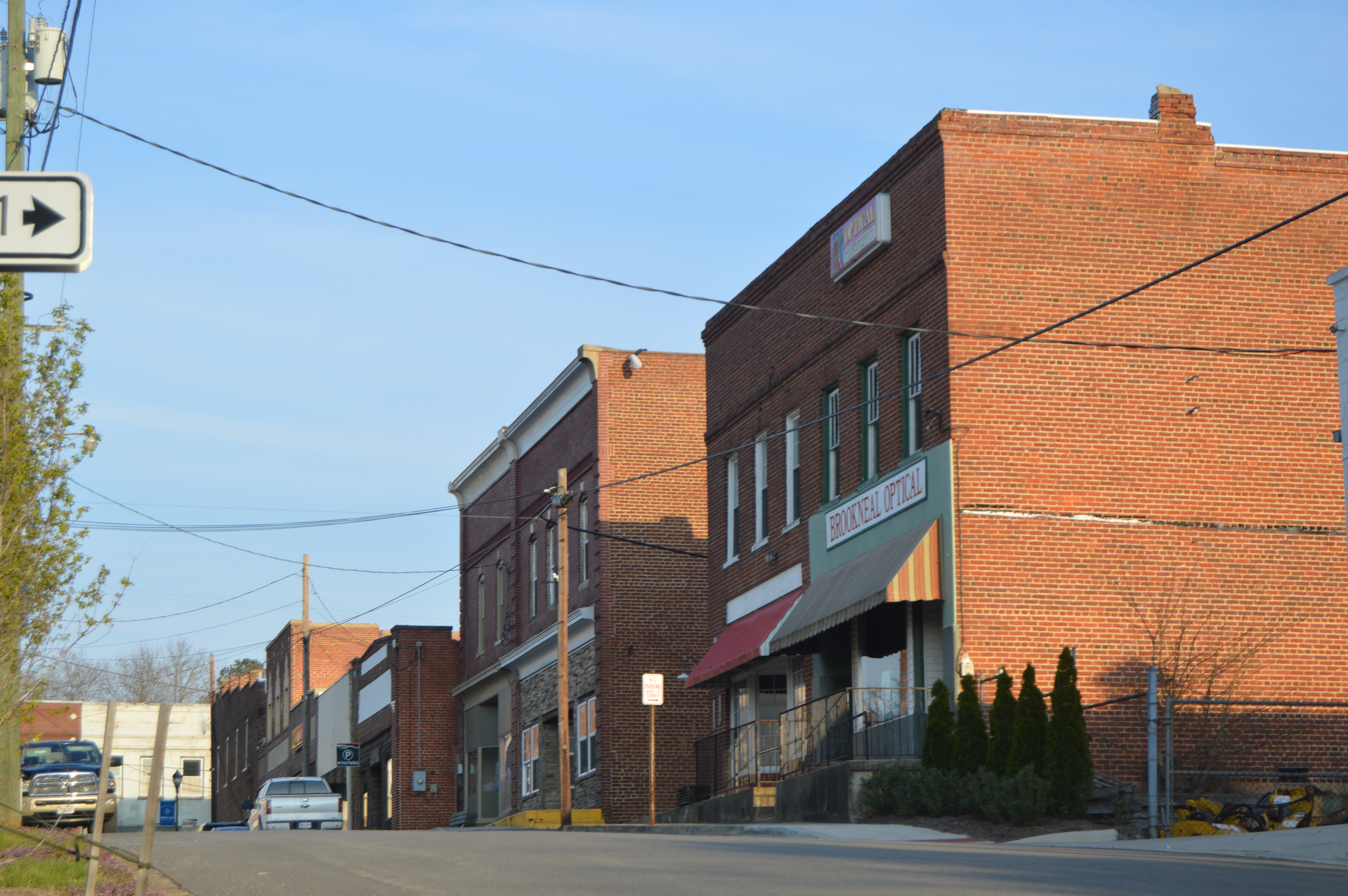
- Rush Street

- Location within Virginia Location within the United States
- Location: Adams Ferry Rd., Old Main, E. Rush & Commerce Sts., Lynchburg, Wycliffe & Cook Aves., & Pick St., Brookneal, Virginia
- Coordinates: 37°03′01″N 78°56′39″W
- Area: 55 acres (22 ha)
- Built: 1812-1960
- Architect: Craighill, Samuel Preston; Johnson, Stanhope; McLaughlin, James T.; Pettit, Charles
- Architectural style: Greek Revival, Commercial Style, Bungalow/Craftsman, 19th- and 20th-century revival
- NRHP reference No.: 11000348
- VLR No.: 179-5021

Significant dates
- Added to NRHP: June 8, 2011
- Designated VLR: March 17, 2011

Brookneal Historic District is a national historic district located at Brookneal, Campbell County, Virginia. It encompasses 105 contributing buildings and 2 contributing structures in the central business district and surrounding residential areas of Brookneal. Most buildings date to the period spanning from 1875 to 1925. Notable buildings include the Lewis Andrew Pick Birthplace, Callaway-Smith House, Henderson Funeral Home, Staunton River Lodge #155 AF&AM, Brookneal Drug Store (1912), N.I. Walthall & Son Department Store, Myers Department Store, Hotel Brookneal (1919), Bank of Brookneal (1913) by McLaughlin Pettit & Johnson, and Brookneal Community Building (1938).

It was listed on the National Register of Historic Places in 2011.
