= Walnut Hill (Lynchburg, Virginia) =

- U.S. National Register of Historic Places
- Virginia Landmarks Register
- Location within Virginia Location within the United States
- Location: Lawyers Rd., near Lynchburg, Virginia
- Coordinates: 37°16′19″N 79°13′16″W
- Area: 196 acres (79 ha)
- Built: 1802, c. 1820; c. 1870; 1948-1950; 1984
- Built by: William Edward Leftwich, Jr.; Mr. Goad
- Architectural style: Early Republic
- NRHP reference No.: 99001724
- VLR No.: 015-5012

Significant dates
- Added to NRHP: January 27, 2000
- Designated VLR: December 1, 1999

Walnut Hill is a historic home located in Campbell County, Virginia. The building is notable mainly for its Georgian architecture and its many structures. Its architectural significance is from the original building and frame remaining. It was listed on the National Register of Historic Places in 2000. The land was initially owned by the Clark family, who obtained it by a land grant from King George III. The property also stood witness to events in the Civil War. A "drill field" or muster ground is said to have existed at Walnut Hill during the war, located on the low ground along Flat Creek at the southeast end of the property.

== Historical and Architectural Significance ==
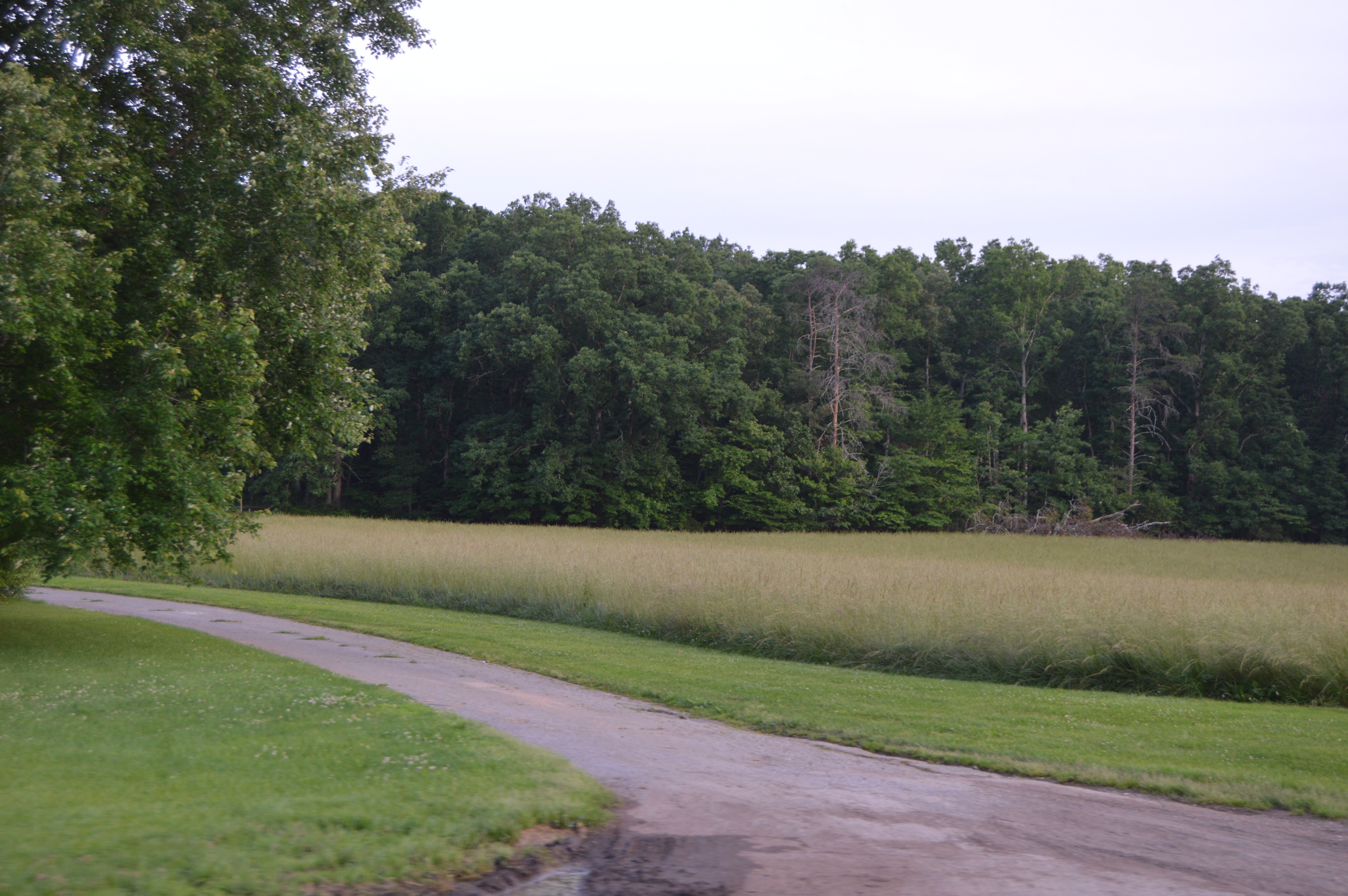
Fields, woods, and the entrance to the farmstead

Walnut Hill is surrounded by fields and meadows and is near Flat Creek. The property is somewhat hidden to passersby as it is surrounded by woods. The one and on half-story dwelling was built in several sections starting in 1802. The oldest section is a log dwelling with an internal gable-end stone chimney and is now the south wing. Before 1820, a two-room-plan frame addition was built onto the north end of the log dwelling; this became the main or front section of the house. The building reflects many evolutionary changes throughout its existence. These modifications are evident by the changing roof lines throughout these divisions. Smaller wings and porches that had been added on were later removed in a restoration/rehabilitation effort lasting from 1948 to 1950.

Walnut Hill displays Georgian style interior finishes. It contains substantial architectural features dating from 1802 to the 1900s. Early sections of the house display standard wooden floorboards, plaster over split lath walls, and ceilings attached with cut nails (some reinforcing wire nails). Both the exposed stonework, fireplace, and the arch are painted white and framed by a Georgian architrave mantel. Most of the woodwork was redone in the 20th century. Also on the property are a contributing smokehouse, chicken house, kitchen chimney, and family cemetery.

== Funerary Significance ==
Twenty-three family members are buried in the Moorman-Leftwich Cemetery which is located on the property. The rectangular cemetery is surrounded by a rough stone wall and sits on a steep-sided ridge above the house. Many of the headstones are also accompanied a footstone. The style of the 18th-century headstones seems more like what is found in North Carolina cemeteries than those of similar date in Virginia. The cemetery is notable for its cantilever style and for the artistry of the monuments it contains. These appear to be done by a competent professional, but the stonemason is unknown.

== Walnut Hill family history ==
The house was original constructed for Samuel Moorman (ca. 1771-1835) and his wife Judith Clark Moorman (ca. 1774-1868) after their marriage in 1796. Samuel's family, originally Quaker, into what is now Campbell County in the mid-1700s. He purchased 450 acres of property from the Goggin family. In 1805 he purchased an additional 60 acres from his brother-in-law Micajah who lived on adjoining tracts. Samuel and Judith raised ten children to adulthood. Judith outlived Samuel by 33 years, leaving the land to her daughter Lucy and her husband, Joel Breckenridge Leftwich. The land has been in ownership of the Leftwich family since then.

Joel Breckenridge Leftwich Sr, was a member of the Campbell County in the Virginia Legislature 1859–1860. He also played a role in the Civil War as Colonel of Reserves. For his service as Sabbath School Superintendent, a plaque was placed at White's United Methodist Church, English Tavern Road in Campbell County. He left Walnut hill to his son William Edward Leftwich (1852-1913).
