= Naruna, Virginia =

Unincorporated community in Virginia, United States

- Unincorporated community
- Location within Virginia Location within the United States
- Coordinates: 37°06′22″N 79°00′09″W
- Country: United States
- State: Virginia
- County: Campbell
- Elevation: 659 ft (201 m)
- Time zone: UTC-5 (Eastern (EST))
  - Summer (DST): UTC-4 (EDT)
- ZIP code: 24576
- Area code: 434
- GNIS feature ID: 1471326

Naruna is an unincorporated community in Campbell County, Virginia, United States. Naruna is located along the Norfolk Southern Railway, 5 miles (8.0 km) northwest of Brookneal. Naruna has a post office with ZIP code 24576, which opened on August 24, 1883.
