= Green Hill (Long Island, Virginia) =

Historic house in Virginia, United States

- U.S. National Register of Historic Places
- U.S. Historic district
- Virginia Landmarks Register
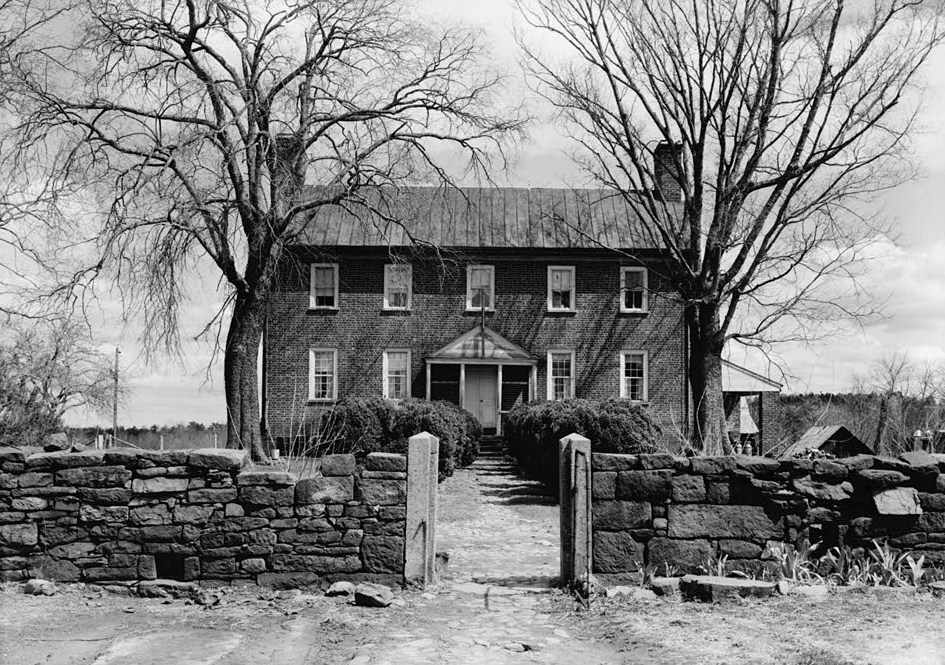
- Green Hill, HABS Photo

- Location within Virginia Location within the United States
- Location: SW of Long Island near jct. of Rtes. 633 and 728, near Long Island, Virginia
- Coordinates: 37°03′51″N 79°3′42″W
- Area: 0 acres (0 ha)
- Built: c. 1800
- NRHP reference No.: 69000226
- VLR No.: 015-0005

Significant dates
- Added to NRHP: November 12, 1969
- Designated VLR: September 9, 1969

Green Hill is a historic plantation house and national historic district located near Long Island, Campbell County, Virginia. The main house is a two-story, five-bay, brick structure with a gable roof, modillioned cornice and two interior end chimneys. The one-story rear ell was built about 1800. The interior features fine woodwork. Also on the property are a contributing frame outbuilding with a partially enclosed shed porch, a brick duck house, an ice house, a kitchen, stone laundry, a frame slave quarters, frame kitchen with stone chimney, mounting block, two log barns, the ruins of a rather large stone stable, and a large tobacco barn.

It was listed on the National Register of Historic Places in 1969.
