= Brookneal, Virginia =

- Town
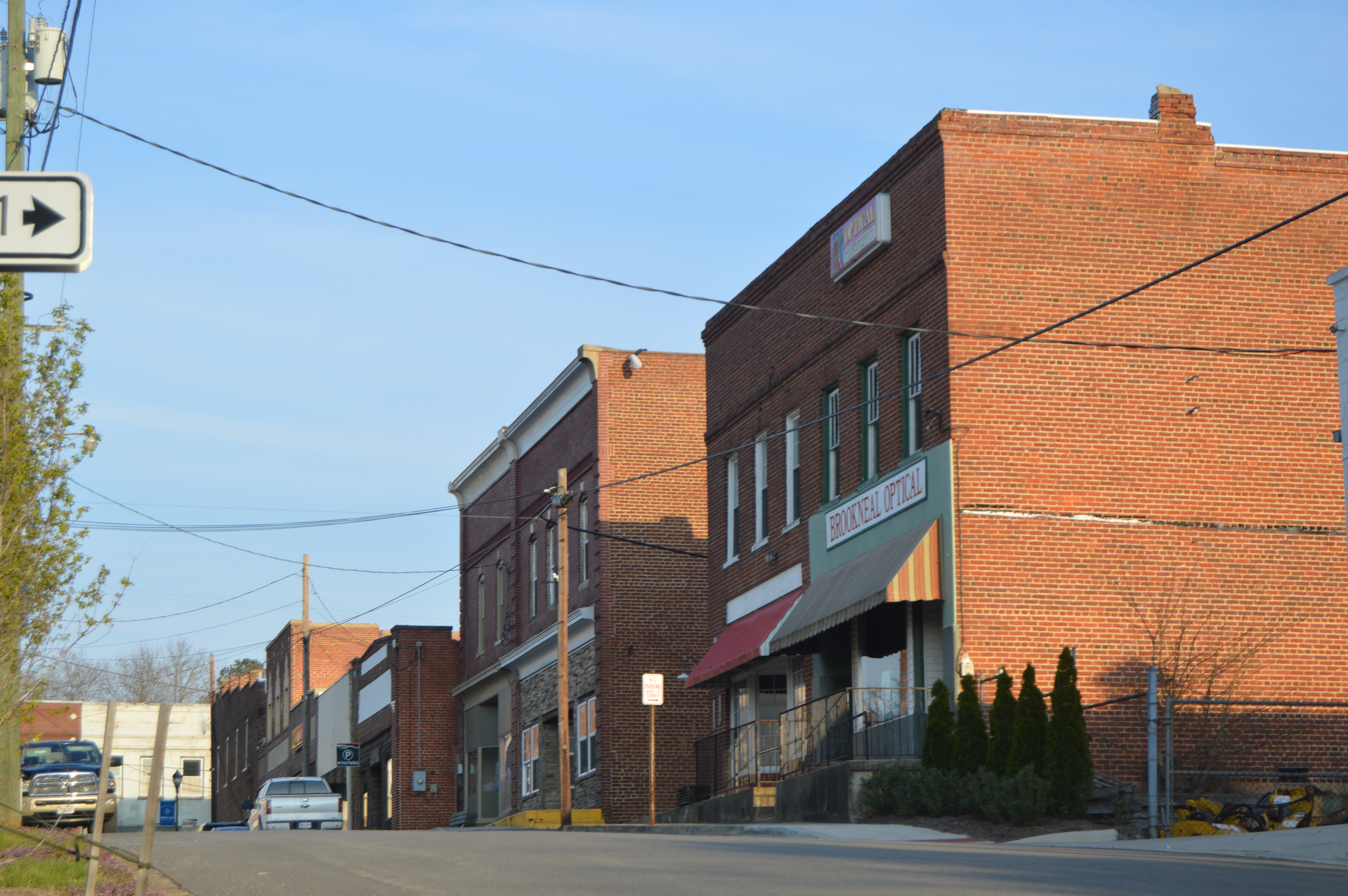
- Rush Street downtown

- Flag Seal Logo

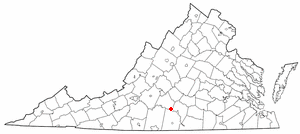
- Location of Brookneal, Virginia
- Coordinates: 37°3′7″N 78°56′42″W
- Country: United States
- State: Virginia
- County: Campbell
- Incorporated: 1908

Government
  - Type: Council–manager
  - Mayor: Kenneth Jennings
  - Town Manager: L. Craig Hughes

Area
  - Total: 3.59 sq mi (9.3 km^{2})
  - Land: 3.50 sq mi (9.1 km^{2})
  - Water: 0.10 sq mi (0.26 km^{2})
- Elevation: 568 ft (173 m)

Population (2020)
  - Total: 1,090
  - Density: 311/sq mi (120/km^{2})
- Time zone: UTC-5 (Eastern (EST))
  - Summer (DST): UTC-4 (EDT)
- ZIP Code: 24528
- Area code: 434
- FIPS code: 51-10296
- GNIS feature ID: 1463884
- Website: www.townofbrookneal.com

Brookneal is an incorporated town in Campbell County, Virginia, United States. The population was 1,090 as of the 2020 census. It is part of the Lynchburg metropolitan area.

== History ==
On January 14, 1802, "Brooke Neal" was established by the Commonwealth of Virginia in Chapter 65 of the Acts of Assembly. It was named after John Brooke and his wife, Sarah (née Neal) Brooke, who established a tobacco warehouse which became known as "Brooke's Warehouse". It was located near the boat landing and ferry crossing on the Staunton River.

The "Town of Brookneal" was incorporated and a charter issued in 1908. Later to become the smallest incorporated town in the Central Virginia region, Brookneal served as the closest center of commerce for portions of Campbell, Charlotte, and Halifax counties. As transportation modes developed, Brookneal's location offered proximity to waterways, roads and railroads.

From the earliest days of settlement of the area by Europeans in the Colony of Virginia, through the Revolutionary War era, and extending through most of the first half of the 19th century in Virginia, waterways were a major transportation resource for commerce. Roads were primitive and poorly maintained. Upstream from the fall line, which marked the western reaches of the coastal plain of Virginia (and adjacent areas of North Carolina), canals and other improvements were constructed to aid navigation upriver by batteaux and another watercraft. In the later 19th century, railroads supplanted river transportation in the Piedmont region east of the mountains.

Just south of Brookneal lies the Roanoke River (also known as the Staunton River), which flows east to its mouth at Plymouth, North Carolina, and the Atlantic Ocean via the sounds in eastern North Carolina. Through the efforts of the Roanoke Navigation Company, established with the assistance of both states in 1815, passage was made possible to as far west as Salem in Roanoke County. By 1828, boats were traversing 124 miles (200 km) of "tolerable good and safe navigation" of the Roanoke River between Brookneal and Salem.

Patrick Henry, the first Governor of Virginia after statehood, was an early advocate of the waterway. In 1794 he retired to the nearly 3,000-acre Red Hill Plantation, located near Brookneal in rural Charlotte County. (The plantation is now operated as a historic museum known as the Red Hill Patrick Henry National Memorial). He established a ferry on the Staunton River to connect Red Hill Plantation with Campbell and Halifax counties on the other side.

By the 1850s, the new technology of railroads was rapidly overtaking the canal systems in many areas; it provided access to additional places. In 1887 the construction of the Lynchburg and Durham Railroad began at Lynchburg, passing south through Brookneal. Just south of town, the railroad crossed the Staunton River into Halifax County. It was completed in 1892, and almost immediately was leased to the Norfolk and Western Railway, and merged into it in 1896. In 1904, the Tidewater Railway was formed by the industrialist financier Henry Huttleston Rogers, to transport bituminous coal from southern West Virginia to coal piers on the ice-free harbor of Hampton Roads. Planned by William Nelson Page of Campbell County, the right-of-way selected for favorable grades passed along the north bank of the river, crossing the L&D track. In 1907, the Tidewater Railway was combined with the Deepwater Railway (initially a West Virginia short line railroad) to form the new Virginian Railway. By 1908, construction was nearing completion, and the new line officially began service on July 1, 1909. In 1959, the Virginia Railway was merged with the Norfolk and Western. Each later became part of the modern Norfolk Southern system in the early 1980s.

In the late 19th century, Brookneal became the site of textile mills that used the water power of the river. These were important to the Piedmont economy for decades. The town of Brookneal suffered a series of disasters in 1912, culminating in a fire that destroyed much of the town. When residents rebuilt, they constructed substantial brick houses to replace many of the old wooden structures. Soon, the small town resumed its growth.

Served for many years by passenger trains and freight service on both railroad lines, and later by U.S. Highway 501 and State Route 40, Brookneal developed a diverse economy with manufacturing, agriculture, service firms and retail offerings. The proximity to the river enhanced its recreational opportunities for residents and visitors as well.

Brookneal has suffered an economic downturn due largely to the dissolution of the Virginia Tobacco Co-Op, which made tobacco warehouses defunct, and the late-20th century decline of the American textile industry, which resulted in the closing of the Dan River mill in Brookneal. The Dan River textile mill employed nearly 400 workers.

Along with Red Hill, the Brookneal Historic District, Cat Rock Sluice of the Roanoke Navigation, Staunton Hill, and Westview are listed on the National Register of Historic Places.

== Geography ==
Brookneal is located at 37°3′7″N 78°56′42″W (37.052001, -78.944958).

According to the United States Census Bureau, the town has a total area of 3.6 square miles (9.4 km^{2}), of which 3.5 square miles (9.1 km^{2}) is land and 0.12 square miles (0.3 km^{2}), or 3.31%, is water.

== Demographics ==
Historical population
Census	Pop.	Note	%±
1910	504		—
1920	583		15.7%
1930	692		18.7%
1940	736		6.4%
1950	883		20.0%
1960	1,070		21.2%
1970	1,037		−3.1%
1980	1,454		40.2%
1990	1,344		−7.6%
2000	1,259		−6.3%
2010	1,112		−11.7%
2020	1,090		−2.0%
U.S. Decennial Census

=== 2020 census ===
As of the census of 2020, there were 1,090 people residing in the town. There were 526 housing units. The racial makeup of the town was 62.3% White, 32.2% African American or Black, 1.0% American Indian, 0.0% Asian, 0.0% Pacific Islander, 1.2% from other races, and 3.3% from two or more races. Hispanic or Latino of any race were 1.2% of the population.

=== 2010 census ===
As of the census of 2010, there were 1,112 people residing in the town. There were 567 housing units. The racial makeup of the town was 62.1% White, 36.3% African American or Black, 0.2% American Indian, 0.0% Asian, 0.0% Pacific Islander, 0.4% from other races, and 0.9% from two or more races. Hispanic or Latino of any race were 1.0% of the population.

=== 2000 census ===
As of the census of 2000, there were 1,259 people, 509 households, and 325 families residing in the town. The population density was 360.0 people per square mile (138.9/km^{2}). There were 580 housing units at an average density of 165.8 per square mile (64.0/km^{2}). The racial makeup of the town was 63.78% White, 34.71% African American, 0.56% from other races, and 0.95% from two or more races. Hispanic or Latino of any race were 1.59% of the population.

There were 509 households, out of which 29.1% had children under the age of 18 living with them, 44.8% were married couples living together, 16.1% had a female householder with no husband present, and 36.0% were non-families. 31.4% of all households were made up of individuals, and 18.1% had someone living alone who was 65 years of age or older. The average household size was 2.36 and the average family size was 2.98.

In the town, the population was spread out, with 24.9% under the age of 18, 5.6% from 18 to 24, 24.4% from 25 to 44, 21.9% from 45 to 64, and 23.2% who were 65 years of age or older. The median age was 42 years. For every 100 females there were 79.6 males. For every 100 females age 18 and over, there were 77.0 males.

From the 2009 census data, the median income for a household in the town was $31,824, and the median income for a family was $42,779. The per capita income for the town was $17,248. About 15.2% of families and 19.8% of the population were below the poverty line, including 26.5% of those under age 18 and 11.5% of those age 65 or over.

== Government ==
Brookneal operates a council–manager form of government. Brookneal Town Council is composed of a mayor and six council members.

Brookneal is part of Virginia's 5th congressional district.

== Education ==
The town is served by Campbell County Public Schools. Public school students residing in Brookneal are zoned to attend Brookneal Elementary School and William Campbell Combined School.

== Climate ==
The climate in this area is characterized by hot, humid summers and generally mild to cool winters. According to the Köppen Climate Classification system, Brookneal has a humid subtropical climate, abbreviated "Cfa" on climate maps.

Climate data for Brookneal, Virginia (1991–2020 normals, extremes 1953–present)
Month	Jan	Feb	Mar	Apr	May	Jun	Jul	Aug	Sep	Oct	Nov	Dec	Year
Record high °F (°C)	78 (26)	82 (28)	88 (31)	94 (34)	94 (34)	103 (39)	103 (39)	105 (41)	102 (39)	97 (36)	84 (29)	77 (25)	105 (41)
Mean daily maximum °F (°C)	47.6 (8.7)	51.6 (10.9)	59.9 (15.5)	70.9 (21.6)	78.2 (25.7)	85.5 (29.7)	88.3 (31.3)	87.2 (30.7)	80.9 (27.2)	70.5 (21.4)	59.9 (15.5)	51.0 (10.6)	69.3 (20.7)
Daily mean °F (°C)	35.9 (2.2)	38.9 (3.8)	45.9 (7.7)	56.2 (13.4)	64.9 (18.3)	72.9 (22.7)	76.6 (24.8)	75.5 (24.2)	68.6 (20.3)	56.9 (13.8)	46.1 (7.8)	39.0 (3.9)	56.4 (13.6)
Mean daily minimum °F (°C)	24.2 (−4.3)	26.2 (−3.2)	31.9 (−0.1)	41.5 (5.3)	51.6 (10.9)	60.3 (15.7)	65.0 (18.3)	63.8 (17.7)	56.4 (13.6)	43.2 (6.2)	32.2 (0.1)	27.1 (−2.7)	43.6 (6.4)
Record low °F (°C)	−7 (−22)	−9 (−23)	8 (−13)	15 (−9)	28 (−2)	37 (3)	45 (7)	38 (3)	31 (−1)	19 (−7)	9 (−13)	0 (−18)	−9 (−23)
Average precipitation inches (mm)	3.73 (95)	2.77 (70)	4.03 (102)	3.39 (86)	4.76 (121)	4.13 (105)	4.29 (109)	3.51 (89)	4.27 (108)	3.82 (97)	3.64 (92)	3.66 (93)	46.00 (1,168)
Average snowfall inches (cm)	3.1 (7.9)	2.3 (5.8)	0.5 (1.3)	0.0 (0.0)	0.0 (0.0)	0.0 (0.0)	0.0 (0.0)	0.0 (0.0)	0.0 (0.0)	0.0 (0.0)	0.0 (0.0)	1.5 (3.8)	7.4 (19)
Average precipitation days (≥ 0.01 in)	9.9	9.2	10.6	10.7	12.0	10.6	10.8	10.2	8.8	9.3	8.6	10.1	120.8
Average snowy days (≥ 0.1 in)	1.8	1.1	0.6	0.0	0.0	0.0	0.0	0.0	0.0	0.0	0.0	0.8	4.3
Source: NOAA

== Notable people ==
- Patrick Henry, Voice of the American Revolution, one of the Founding Fathers, Governor of Virginia
- Charlie Pick, Major League Baseball infielder
- Lewis A. Pick, Lieutenant General and Chief of Engineers, United States Army
- Dagen McDowell, Business correspondent, Fox News
- Buddy Booker, Major League Baseball catcher
